= 2015–16 Eintracht Frankfurt season =

Eintracht Frankfurt
2015–16 season
- Chairman: Heribert Bruchhagen
- Manager: Armin Veh (resigned 6 March 2016); Niko Kovač (appointed 8 March 2016)
- Bundesliga: 16th (relegation play-offs)
- DFB-Pokal: Second round
- Top goalscorer: League: Alexander Meier (12); All: Alexander Meier (12)
- Highest home attendance: 51,500 (sold out) on four occasions (league)
- Lowest home attendance: 35,000 24 January 2016 v VfL Wolfsburg (league)
- Average home league attendance: 46,676
Home colours	Away colours	Third colours
- All statistics correct as of 15 May 2016.

The 2015–16 Eintracht Frankfurt season was the 116th season in the club's football history. In 2015–16 the club plays in the Bundesliga, the top tier of German football. It was the club's fourth season back in the Bundesliga and the 47th overall.

== Friendlies ==
Win Draw Loss

7 July 2015	Wacker Innsbruck II (Austria)	0–4	Eintracht Frankfurt	Kematen, Austria
18:00 CET (UTC+01:00)		(Report)	Stendera 7'; Castaignos 30', 56'; Wölfert 90'	Attendance: 700

10 July 2015	SC Schwaz (Austria)	0–6	Eintracht Frankfurt	Schwaz, Austria
19:00 CET (UTC+01:00)		Report	28' (o.g.); Abraham 49'; Inui 59'; Gerezgiher 64', 90'; Russ 70'	Stadium: Silberstadt-Arena; Attendance: 800

18 July 2015	1. FC Heidenheim (Germany)	2–1	Eintracht Frankfurt	Heidenheim, Germany
15:30 CET (UTC+01:00)	Feick 65', 71'	(Report)	Castaignos 45'	Stadium: Voith-Arena; Attendance: 7,500

21 July 2015	Eintracht Frankfurt	2–1	(England) Leeds United	Eugendorf, Austria
18:15 CET (UTC+01:00)	Flum 59'; Reinartz 73'	(Report)	Morison 25'	Stadium: Sportzentrum Eugendorf; Attendance: 1,500

25 July 2015	Eintracht Frankfurt	1–0	(England) Fulham	Irdning, Austria
16:30 CET (UTC+01:00)	Seferovic 38'	(Report)		Stadium: Petutschnig-Arena; Attendance: 500

29 July 2015	Eintracht Stadtallendorf (Germany)	1–6	Eintracht Frankfurt	Stadtallendorf, Germany
18:30 CET (UTC+01:00)	Tega 30'	(Report)	Aigner 21'; Waldschmidt 47'; Seferovic 60', 70', 90'; Flum 69'	Stadium: Herrenwaldstadion; Attendance: 6,000; Referee: Martenstein

2 August 2015	Eintracht Frankfurt	3–2	(Japan) FC Tokyo	Frankfurt, Germany
15:15 CET (UTC+01:00)	Seferovic 41'; Stendera 45'; Aigner 59'	(Report)	Maeda 20'; Burns 22'	Stadium: Commerzbank-Arena; Attendance: 50,000; Referee: Tobias Stieler

2 August 2015	Eintracht Frankfurt	0–1	(Germany) SV Sandhausen	Frankfurt, Germany
			Mamba 75'	Stadium: Riederwaldstadion; Attendance: 0
Note: This was a private match, without any attendance.

10 January 2016	Al-Ahli SC (Saudi Arabia)	1–5	Eintracht Frankfurt	Abu Dhabi, United Arab Emirates
16:00 GST (UTC+04:00)	Salman 38'	(Report)	Meier 9', 48'; Huszti 34'; Waldschmidt 50'; Gaćinović 89'	Stadium: Emirates Palace; Attendance: 200

12 January 2016	Eintracht Frankfurt	0–4	(Germany) Borussia Dortmund	Dubai, United Arab Emirates
19:30 GST (UTC+04:00)		(Report)	Gündoğan 39' (pen.); Ramos 48', 68'; Kagawa 62'	Stadium: Maktoum Bin Rashid Al Maktoum Stadium

12 January 2016	Eintracht Frankfurt	3–3	(Germany) Eintracht Braunschweig	Frankfurt, Germany
14:00 CET (UTC+01:00)	Gaćinović 60'; Fabián 74', 75'	(Report)	Correia 38'; Ademi 64', 65'	Stadium: Training pitch at Commerzbank-Arena; Attendance: 0
Note: This was a private match, without any attendance.

10 February 2016	Eintracht Frankfurt	v	(Germany) KSV Klein-Karben / FC Karben	Frankfurt, Germany
16:00 CET (UTC+01:00)				Stadium: Riederwaldstadion
Note: The match is postponed due to bad weather conditions until further notice

== Competitions ==
Win Draw Loss

=== Bundesliga ===
==== League table ====
Pos	Team	Pld	W	D	L	GF	GA	GD	Pts	Qualification or relegation
14	Darmstadt 98	34	9	11	14	38	53	−15	38	
15	1899 Hoffenheim	34	9	10	15	39	54	−15	37	
16	Eintracht Frankfurt (O)	34	9	9	16	34	52	−18	36	Qualification for the relegation play-offs
17	VfB Stuttgart (R)	34	9	6	19	50	75	−25	33	Relegation to 2. Bundesliga
18	Hannover 96 (R)	34	7	4	23	31	62	−31	25	Relegation to 2. Bundesliga

Source: DFB
Rules for classification: 1) Points; 2) Goal difference; 3) Goals scored; 4) Head-to-head points; 5) Head-to-head goal difference; 6) Head-to-head away goals scored; 7) Away goals scored; 8) Play-offs.
(O) Play-off winners; (R) Relegated

==== Results summary ====
Overall								Home						Away					
Pld	W	D	L	GF	GA	GD	Pts	W	D	L	GF	GA	GD	W	D	L	GF	GA	GD
34	9	9	16	34	52	−18	36	6	6	5	22	24	−2	3	3	11	12	28	−16

Last updated: 14 May 2016.
Source: Bundesliga

==== Results by round ====
Round	1	2	3	4	5	6	7	8	9	10	11	12	13	14	15	16	17	18	19	20	21	22	23	24	25	26	27	28	29	30	31	32	33	34
Ground	A	H	A	H	A	A	H	A	H	A	H	A	H	A	H	A	H	H	A	H	A	H	H	A	H	A	H	A	H	A	H	A	H	A
Result	L	D	W	W	D	L	D	L	L	W	D	D	L	L	L	L	W	W	D	L	L	D	D	L	D	L	W	L	L	L	W	W	W	L
Position	11	12	8	4	8	12	11	12	13	12	11	12	12	13	13	15	14	14	13	15	15	15	15	16	16	16	17	17	17	17	17	16	15	16

Updated to match(es) played on 14 May 2016. Source: Bundesliga
A = Away; H = Home; W = Win; D = Draw; L = Loss

==== Matches ====
16 August 2015 1	VfL Wolfsburg	2–1	Eintracht Frankfurt	Wolfsburg
15:30 CEST (UTC+02:00)	Perišić 13'; Dost 17'; De Bruyne (yellow card) 45+3'	Report	Reinartz 19'; Zambrano (yellow card) 45+3'	Stadium: Volkswagen Arena; Attendance: 29,126; Referee: Christian Dingert

22 August 2015 2	Eintracht Frankfurt	1–1	FC Augsburg	Frankfurt
15:30 CEST (UTC+02:00)	Hasebe (yellow card) 20'; Russ 86'; Zambrano (yellow card) 89'	Report	Caiuby 23'; Kohr (yellow card) 53'; Verhaegh (yellow card) 89'; Feulner (yellow card) 90+1'	Stadium: Commerzbank-Arena; Attendance: 45,000; Referee: Florian Meyer

29 August 2015 3	VfB Stuttgart	1–4	Eintracht Frankfurt	Stuttgart
15:30 CEST (UTC+02:00)	Didavi 30', (yellow card) 48'; Tytoń (red card) 67'; Hloušek (yellow card) 86'; Ginczek (yellow card) 89'	Report	Hloušek 11' (o.g.); Chandler (yellow card) 21'; Stendera (yellow card) 26'; Castaignos 42', 87'; Abraham (yellow card) 50'; Seferovic 69' (pen.)	Stadium: Mercedes-Benz Arena; Attendance: 49,327; Referee: Bastian Dankert

12 September 2015 4	Eintracht Frankfurt	6–2	1. FC Köln	Frankfurt
18:30 CEST (UTC+02:00)	Stendera (yellow card) 1'; Meier 4', 23', 87'; Castaignos 15', 30'; Reinartz (yellow card) 63'; Seferovic 73'	Report	Modeste 28'; Heintz 81'; Hector (yellow card) 89'	Stadium: Commerzbank-Arena; Attendance: 51,500; Referee: Marco Fritz

19 September 2015 5	Hamburger SV	0–0	Eintracht Frankfurt	Hamburg
15:30 CEST (UTC+02:00)		Report	Hasebe (yellow card) 9'; Seferovic (yellow card) 65'; Russ (yellow card) 67'; Oczipka (yellow card) 76'	Stadium: Volksparkstadion; Attendance: 55,322; Referee: Wolfgang Stark

23 September 2015 6	Schalke 04	2–0	Eintracht Frankfurt	Gelsenkirchen
20:00 CEST (UTC+02:00)	Höger (yellow card) 12'; Matip 76'; Kolašinac (yellow card) 87'; Sané 90+1'	Report	Russ (yellow card) 65'; Abraham (yellow card) 79'	Stadium: Veltins-Arena; Attendance: 60,104; Referee: Felix Zwayer

27 September 2015 7	Eintracht Frankfurt	1–1	Hertha BSC	Frankfurt
15:30 CEST (UTC+02:00)	Stendera (yellow card) 19'; Meier 22'; Ignjovski (yellow card) 86'	Report	Stark (yellow card) 16'; Darida 82'	Stadium: Commerzbank-Arena; Attendance: 46,000; Referee: Benjamin Brand

3 October 2015 8	FC Ingolstadt	2–0	Eintracht Frankfurt	Ingolstadt
15:30 CEST (UTC+02:00)	Suttner (yellow card) 65'; Groß 78'; Lex 84'	Report	Hasebe (yellow card) 31'; Oczipka (yellow card) 54'	Stadium: Audi Sportpark; Attendance: 15,000; Referee: Manuel Gräfe

17 October 2015 9	Eintracht Frankfurt	1–5	Borussia Mönchengladbach	Frankfurt
18:30 CEST (UTC+02:00)	Meier 29' (pen.); Seferovic (yellow card) 62'; Aigner (yellow card) 64'; Djakpa (yellow card) 76'; Russ (yellow card) 82'	Report	Raffael 16', 57'; Sommer (yellow card) 28'; Stindl (yellow card) 31'; Dahoud 51'; Korb (yellow card) 59'; Hahn 82' (pen.), 90'	Stadium: Commerzbank-Arena; Attendance: 50,700; Referee: Florian Meyer

24 October 2015 10	Hannover 96	1–2	Eintracht Frankfurt	Hanover
15:30 CEST (UTC+02:00)	Klaus 51'; Sané (yellow card) 53'	Report	Reinartz (yellow card) 28'; Russ (yellow card) 35'; Stendera 57', 65'; Seferovic (yellow card) 68'; Zambrano (yellow card) 73'	Stadium: HDI-Arena; Attendance: 44,200; Referee: Felix Zwayer

30 October 2015 11	Eintracht Frankfurt	0–0	Bayern Munich	Frankfurt
20:30 CET (UTC+01:00)	Aigner (yellow card) 1'; Seferovic (yellow card) 57'; Abraham (yellow card) 83'; Ignjovski (yellow card) 90+5'	Report	Lahm (yellow card) 69'; Robben (yellow card) 85'	Stadium: Commerzbank-Arena; Attendance: 51,500; Referee: Daniel Siebert

7 November 2015 12	TSG Hoffenheim	0–0	Eintracht Frankfurt	Sinsheim
15:30 CET (UTC+01:00)	Schwegler (yellow card) 68'	Report	Seferovic (yellow card) 11'; Zambrano (yellow card) 78'; Stendera (yellow card) 90+3'	Stadium: Wirsol Rhein-Neckar-Arena; Attendance: 30,150; Referee: Knut Kircher

21 November 2015 13	Eintracht Frankfurt	1–3	Bayer Leverkusen	Frankfurt
15:30 CET (UTC+01:00)	Medojević 45'; Oczipka (yellow card) 66'; Gerezgiher (yellow card) 69'	Report	Hernández 23', 39'; Çalhanoğlu 72'; Mehmedi (yellow card) 77'	Stadium: Commerzbank-Arena; Attendance: 47,500; Referee: Deniz Aytekin

28 November 2015 14	Mainz 05	2–1	Eintracht Frankfurt	Mainz
15:45 CET (UTC+01:00)	Muto 5'; Mallı 42'; Latza (yellow card) 62'; Hack (yellow card) 65'; Niederlechner (yellow card) 83'; Baumgartlinger (yellow card) 90+3'	Report	Abraham (yellow card) 25'; Meier (yellow card) 28' (yellow-red card) 40'; Seferovic 61'; Gaćinović (yellow card) 89'	Stadium: Coface Arena; Attendance: 33,098; Referee: Bastian Dankert

6 December 2015 15	Eintracht Frankfurt	0–1	Darmstadt 98	Frankfurt
17:30 CET (UTC+01:00)	Seferovic (yellow card) 39'; Stendera (yellow card) 58'; Zambrano (yellow card) 59'; Russ (yellow card) 87'	Report	Sulu 30'; Holland (yellow card) 50'; Niemeyer (yellow card) 58'; Mathenia (yellow card) 85'	Stadium: Commerzbank-Arena; Attendance: 51,500; Referee: Felix Brych

13 December 2015 16	Borussia Dortmund	4–1	Eintracht Frankfurt	Dortmund
17:30 CET (UTC+01:00)	Mkhitaryan 24'; Aubameyang 57'; Hummels 61'; Ramos 86'	Report	Meier 6'; Medojević (yellow card) 28' (yellow-red card) 44'	Stadium: Signal Iduna Park; Attendance: 81,359; Referee: Christian Dingert

19 December 2015 17	Eintracht Frankfurt	2–1	Werder Bremen	Frankfurt
15:30 CET (UTC+01:00)	Kadlec (yellow card) 10'; Meier 31'; Aigner (yellow card) 42', (goal) 48'; Ignjovski (yellow card) 79'	Report	Fritz (yellow card) 14'; Pizarro 29'; Sternberg (yellow card) 78'; Zetterer (yellow card) 79'; Öztunalı (yellow card) 86'; U. Garcia (yellow card) 87'	Stadium: Commerzbank-Arena; Attendance: 46,000; Referee: Wolfgang Stark

24 January 2016 18	Eintracht Frankfurt	3–2	VfL Wolfsburg	Frankfurt
15:30 CET (UTC+01:00)	Huszti (yellow card) 56'; Meier 66', 73', 90+3'; Hasebe (yellow card) 85'	Report	Dante 25'; Schürrle 79'	Stadium: Commerzbank-Arena; Attendance: 35,000; Referee: Knut Kircher

30 January 2016 19	FC Augsburg	0–0	Eintracht Frankfurt	Augsburg
15:30 CET (UTC+01:00)	Baier (yellow card) 42'; Kohr (yellow card) 47'	Report	Abraham (yellow card) 62'; Hasebe (yellow card) 79'	Stadium: WWK ARENA; Attendance: 28,653; Referee: Sascha Stegemann

6 February 2016 20	Eintracht Frankfurt	2–4	VfB Stuttgart	Frankfurt
15:30 CET (UTC+01:00)	Oczipka (yellow card) 37'; Meier 52'; Zambrano (yellow card) 63' (yellow-red card) 75'; Huszti 90'	Report	Gentner 27'; Didavi (yellow card) 36' (yellow-red card) 67', (goal) 45+1'; Großkreutz (yellow card) 51'; Niedermeier 65'; Kostić 76' (pen.)	Stadium: Commerzbank-Arena; Attendance: 42,000; Referee: Peter Sippel

13 February 2016 21	1. FC Köln	3–1	Eintracht Frankfurt	Cologne
18:30 CET (UTC+01:00)	Gerhardt 29'; Risse (yellow card) 54'; Heintz 57'; Modeste (yellow card) 66', (goal) 72'	Report	Fabián (yellow card) 19'; Meier 24'; Regäsel (yellow card) 50'; Hasebe (yellow card) 52'; Stendera (yellow card) 66'; Russ (yellow card) 66'; Oczipka (yellow card) 82'	Stadium: RheinEnergieSTADION; Attendance: 49,200; Referee: Felix Zwayer

19 February 2016 22	Eintracht Frankfurt	0–0	Hamburger SV	Frankfurt
20:30 CET (UTC+01:00)	Zambrano (yellow card) 62'; Aigner (yellow card) 85'	Report	Djourou (yellow card) 21'; Drmić (yellow card) 38'; Lasogga (yellow card) 89'	Stadium: Commerzbank-Arena; Attendance: 47,200; Referee: Wolfgang Stark

28 February 2016 23	Eintracht Frankfurt	0–0	Schalke 04	Frankfurt
19:30 CET (UTC+01:00)	Hasebe (yellow card) 90+1'	Report	Aogo (yellow card) 88'; Meyer (yellow card) 90+1'	Stadium: Commerzbank-Arena; Attendance: 43,500; Referee: Felix Brych

2 March 2016 24	Hertha BSC	2–0	Eintracht Frankfurt	Berlin
20:00 CET (UTC+01:00)	Darida (yellow card) 5'; Weiser (yellow card) 33', (goal) 63'; Kalou 78'; Stocker (yellow card) 90+3'	Report	Aigner (yellow card) 53'; Stendera (yellow card) 58'	Stadium: Olympiastadion; Attendance: 36,608; Referee: Knut Kircher

5 March 2016 25	Eintracht Frankfurt	1–1	FC Ingolstadt	Frankfurt
15:30 CET (UTC+01:00)	Zambrano (yellow card) 27'; Oczipka (yellow card) 39'; Russ (yellow card) 44', (goal) 69'; Hasebe (yellow card) 67'; Fabián (yellow card) 90+3'	Report	Hartmann 8' (pen.), (yellow card) 79'; Groß (yellow card) 35' (yellow-red card) 74'; Christiansen (yellow card) 51'; Brégerie (yellow card) 67'; Roger (yellow card) 77'	Stadium: Commerzbank-Arena; Attendance: 40,000; Referee: Sascha Stegemann

12 March 2016 26	Borussia Mönchengladbach	3–0	Eintracht Frankfurt	Mönchengladbach
15:30 CET (UTC+01:00)	Stindl 36'; Raffael 53'; Dahoud 79', (yellow card) 87'	Report	Hasebe (yellow card) 36'; Abraham (yellow card) 76'; Huszti (yellow card) 87'	Stadium: Stadion im Borussia-Park; Attendance: 54,010; Referee: Michael Weiner

19 March 2016 27	Eintracht Frankfurt	1–0	Hannover 96	Frankfurt
18:30 CET (UTC+01:00)	Ben-Hatira 33'; Seferovic (yellow card) 87'	Report	Zieler (yellow card) 77'; Gülselam (yellow card) 81'; Almeida (yellow card) 90+3'	Stadium: Commerzbank-Arena; Attendance: 43,300; Referee: Wolfgang Stark

2 April 2016 28	Bayern Munich	1–0	Eintracht Frankfurt	Munich
15:30 CEST (UTC+02:00)	Ribéry 20'; Lewandowski (yellow card) 41'; Götze (yellow card) 55'	Report	Abraham (yellow card) 41'; Ben-Hatira (yellow card) 45'; Chandler (yellow card) 49'; Stendera (yellow card) 51'; Castaignos (yellow card) 90+3'	Stadium: Allianz Arena; Attendance: 75,000; Referee: Florian Meyer

9 April 2016 29	Eintracht Frankfurt	0–2	TSG Hoffenheim	Frankfurt
15:30 CEST (UTC+02:00)	Seferovic (yellow card) 67'; Abraham (yellow card) 75'; Ayhan (yellow card) 88'	Report	Amiri 62'; Süle (yellow card) 68'; Uth (yellow card) 71', (goal) 90'; Rudy (yellow card) 76'; Strobl (yellow card) 78'	Stadium: Commerzbank-Arena; Attendance: 51,000; Referee: Felix Brych

16 April 2016 30	Bayer Leverkusen	3–0	Eintracht Frankfurt	Leverkusen
15:30 CEST (UTC+02:00)	Yurchenko (yellow card) 34'; Bellarabi (yellow card) 61', (goal) 90'; Kampl 70'; Tah (yellow card) 73'; Brandt 76'; Jedvaj (yellow card) 78'	Report	Seferovic (yellow card) 60'; Aigner (yellow card) 73'; Chandler (yellow card) 85'	Stadium: BayArena; Attendance: 30,210; Referee: Deniz Aytekin

24 April 2016 31	Eintracht Frankfurt	2–1	Mainz 05	Frankfurt
17:30 CEST (UTC+02:00)	Russ (yellow card) 17', (goal) 28'; Ben-Hatira (yellow card) 44'; Huszti (yellow card) 52'; Bell 84' (o.g.); Zambrano (yellow card) 89'	Report	Brosinski 18', (yellow card) 27'; Baumgartlinger (yellow card) 36'; Donati (yellow card) 45+1'; Córdoba (yellow card) 60'	Stadium: Commerzbank-Arena; Attendance: 50,300; Referee: Felix Zwayer

30 April 2016 32	Darmstadt 98	1–2	Eintracht Frankfurt	Darmstadt
15:30 CEST (UTC+02:00)	Vrančić 12'; Mathenia (yellow card) 55'; Jungwirth (yellow card) 86'	Report	Seferovic (yellow card) 19'; Huszti (yellow card) 37'; Hasebe 56'; Aigner 83'	Stadium: Merck-Stadion am Böllenfalltor; Attendance: 14,800; Referee: Manuel Gräfe

7 May 2016 33	Eintracht Frankfurt	1–0	Borussia Dortmund	Frankfurt
15:30 CEST (UTC+02:00)	Aigner 14', (yellow card) 80'; Huszti (yellow card) 38'; Chandler (yellow card) 73'; Djakpa (yellow card) 76'; Stendera (yellow card) 85'	Report	Aubameyang (yellow card) 15'; Mkhitaryan (yellow card) 43'; Schmelzer (yellow card) 73'	Stadium: Commerzbank-Arena; Attendance: 51,500; Referee: Daniel Siebert

14 May 2016 34	Werder Bremen	1–0	Eintracht Frankfurt	Bremen
15:30 CEST (UTC+02:00)	Grillitsch (yellow card) 50'; Gebre Selassie (yellow card) 78'; Djilobodji 88'; Ujah (yellow card) 89'; Junuzović (yellow card) 90+2'	Report	Oczipka (yellow card) 64'; Russ (yellow card) 90'	Stadium: Weserstadion; Attendance: 42,100; Referee: Deniz Aytekin

==== Relegation play-offs ====
19 May 2016 First leg	Eintracht Frankfurt	1–1	1. FC Nürnberg	Frankfurt
20:30 CEST (UTC+02:00)	Russ (yellow card) 56'; Gaćinović 65'	Report	Russ 43' (o.g.); Schäfer (yellow card) 57'	Stadium: Commerzbank-Arena; Attendance: 51,500; Referee: Daniel Siebert

23 May 2016 Second leg	1. FC Nürnberg	0–1 (1–2 agg.)	Eintracht Frankfurt	Nuremberg
20:30 CEST (UTC+02:00)	Kerk (yellow card) 56'; Brečko (yellow card) 72'; Burgstaller (yellow card) 90+2'	Report	Oczipka (yellow card) 24'; Fabián (yellow card) 51'; Seferovic 66', (yellow card) 76'; Hrádecký (yellow card) 90+1'; Abraham (yellow card) 90+4'	Stadium: Grundig Stadion; Attendance: 50,000; Referee: Christian Dingert

=== DFB-Pokal ===
8 August 2015 First round	Bremer SV	0–3	Eintracht Frankfurt	Bremen
15:30 CEST (UTC+02:00)	Koweschnikow (yellow card) 36'	Report	Castaignos 31'; Aigner 52'; Waldschmidt 71'	Stadium: Sportpark am Vinnenweg; Attendance: 3,400; Referee: Thorsten Schriever

27 October 2015 Second round	Erzgebirge Aue	1–0	Eintracht Frankfurt	Aue
19:00 CET (UTC+01:00)	Riese (yellow card) 61'; Wegner 74'	Report		Stadium: Sparkassen-Erzgebirgsstadion; Attendance: 10,175; Referee: Robert Hartmann

== Squad ==
=== Squad and statistics ===
As of 15 May 2016

No.	Pos	Nat	Player	Total		Bundesliga		DFB-Pokal	
No.	Pos	Nat	Player	Apps	Goals	Apps	Goals	Apps	Goals
1	GK	(Finland) FIN	Lukáš Hrádecký	35	0	34	0	1	0
2	DF	(Germany) GER	Yanni Regäsel	10	0	10	0	0	0
3	DF	(Turkey) TUR	Kaan Ayhan	2	0	2	0	0	0
4	DF	(Germany) GER	Marco Russ	30	3	28	3	2	0
5	DF	(Peru) PER	Carlos Zambrano	26	0	24	0	2	0
6	DF	(Germany) GER	Bastian Oczipka	32	0	30	0	2	0
7	MF	(Germany) GER	Stefan Reinartz	17	1	15	1	2	0
8	MF	(Japan) JPN	~~Takashi Inui~~	2	0	1	0	1	0
8	MF	(Hungary) HUN	Szabolcs Huszti	15	1	15	1	0	0
9	FW	(Switzerland) SUI	Haris Seferovic	31	3	29	3	2	0
10	FW	(Czech Republic) CZE	~~Václav Kadlec~~	5	0	5	0	0	0
10	MF	(Mexico) MEX	Marco Fabián	11	0	11	0	0	0
11	MF	(Serbia) SRB	Mijat Gaćinović	7	0	7	0	0	0
13	GK	(Austria) AUT	Heinz Lindner	1	0	0	0	1	0
14	MF	(Germany) GER	Alexander Meier	20	12	19	12	1	0
15	DF	(Ivory Coast) CIV	Constant Djapka	13	0	12	0	1	0
16	MF	(Germany) GER	Stefan Aigner	33	4	31	3	2	1
18	MF	(Germany) GER	Johannes Flum	6	0	5	0	1	0
19	DF	(Argentina) ARG	David Abraham	31	0	31	0	0	0
20	MF	(Japan) JPN	Makoto Hasebe	34	0	32	0	2	0
21	MF	(Germany) GER	Marc Stendera	28	2	26	2	2	0
22	DF	(United States) USA	Timothy Chandler	12	0	12	0	0	0
23	DF	(Brazil) BRA	Anderson Bamba	0	0	0	0	0	0
24	FW	(Germany) GER	Luca Waldschmidt	14	1	12	0	2	1
25	MF	(Serbia) SRB	Slobodan Medojević	15	1	14	1	1	0
27	MF	(Serbia) SRB	Aleksandar Ignjovski	18	0	18	0	0	0
28	MF	(Germany) GER	Sonny Kittel	8	0	8	0	0	0
29	GK	(Azerbaijan) AZE	Emil Balayev	0	0	0	0	0	0
30	FW	(Netherlands) NED	Luc Castaignos	20	5	19	4	1	1
31	DF	(Germany) GER	~~David Kinsombi~~	2	0	2	0	0	0
32	MF	(Tunisia) TUN	Änis Ben-Hatira	9	1	9	1	0	0
32	MF	(Germany) GER	~~Joel Gerezgiher~~ (on loan)	4	0	3	0	1	0
33	GK	(Germany) GER	Yannick Zummack	0	0	0	0	0	0
35	DF	(Germany) GER	Nico Rinderknecht	1	0	1	0	0	0
38	FW	(Kosovo) KOS	Enis Bunjaki	0	0	0	0	0	0

=== Transfers ===
==== Transferred in ====
No.	Pos.	Name	Age	EU	Moving from	Type	Transfer Window	Contract ends	Transfer fee	Sources
1	Goalkeeper	Lukáš Hrádecký	25	Yes	Brøndby	Transfer	Summer	30 June 2018	€2.0 million	
7	Midfielder	Stefan Reinartz	26	Yes	Bayer Leverkusen	Free transfer	Summer	30 June 2017	Free	
10	Striker	Václav Kadlec	23	Yes	Sparta Prague	Loan return	Summer	30 June 2017	—	
11	Midfielder	Mijat Gaćinović	20	No	Vojvodina	Transfer	Summer	30 June 2019	€1.5 million	
13	Goalkeeper	Heinz Lindner	24	Yes	Austria Wien	Free transfer	Summer	30 June 2017	Free	
19	Defender	David Abraham	28	Yes	TSG Hoffenheim	Transfer	Summer	30 June 2018	€2.0 million	
30	Striker	Luc Castaignos	22	Yes	Twente	Transfer	Summer	30 June 2018	€2.5 million	
35	Defender	Nico Rinderknecht	17	Yes	Eintracht Frankfurt U19	Academy	Summer	30 June 2016	Free	
38	Forward	Enis Bunjaki	17	Yes	Eintracht Frankfurt U19	Academy	Summer	30 June 2017	Free	
2	Defender	Yanni Regäsel	20	Yes	Hertha BSC	Transfer	Winter	30 June 2019	€120,000	
3	Defender	Kaan Ayhan	21	Yes	Schalke 04	Loan	Winter	30 June 2016	Undisclosed	
8	Midfielder	Szabolcs Huszti	32	Yes	Changchun Yatai	Transfer	Winter	30 June 2017	€250,000	
10	Midfielder	Marco Fabián	26	No	Guadalajara	Transfer	Winter	30 June 2019	€3.5 million	
32	Midfielder	Änis Ben-Hatira	27	Yes	Hertha BSC	Free transfer	Winter	30 June 2016	Free	

==== Transferred out ====
No.	Pos.	Name	Age	EU	Moving to	Type	Transfer Window	Transfer fee	Sources
1	Goalkeeper	Kevin Trapp	25	Yes	Paris Saint-Germain	Transfer	Summer	€9.5 million	
3	Forward	Yusupha Yaffa	27	Yes	MSV Duisburg II	End of contract	Summer	Free	
7	Midfielder	Jan Rosenthal	29	Yes	Darmstadt 98	Released. Was previously already on loan to Darmstadt 98.	Summer	Free	
8	Midfielder	Takashi Inui	27	No	Eibar	Transfer	Summer	€500,000	
9	Forward	Olivier Occéan	33	No	Odd	Released. Was previously already on loan to Odd.	Summer	Free	
11	Forward	Nelson Valdez	31	No	Seattle Sounders FC	Released	Summer	Free	
17	Defender	Alexander Madlung	32	Yes	Fortuna Düsseldorf	End of contract	Summer	Free	
19	Midfielder	Lucas Piazon	21	Yes	Chelsea	Loan return	Summer	Free	
30	Goalkeeper	Felix Wiedwald	25	Yes	Werder Bremen	Free Transfer	Summer	Free	
10	Forward	Václav Kadlec	23	Yes	Midtjylland	Transfer	Winter	€2.0 million	
31	Defender	David Kinsombi	20	Yes	Karlsruher SC, directly loaned to 1. FC Magdeburg	Transfer	Winter	Undisclosed	
32	Midfielder	Joel Gerezgiher	20	Yes	FSV Frankfurt	Loan	Winter	Undisclosed	
