= 2012–13 1. FC Nürnberg season =

1. FC Nürnberg
2012–13 season
- Manager: Dieter Hecking / Michael Wiesinger
- Stadium: Frankenstadion
- Bundesliga: 10th
- DFB-Pokal: 1st Round
- Top goalscorer: League: Nilsson (6); All: Nilsson (6)
- Highest home attendance: 50,000 vs Dortmund, Bayern and Fürth
- Lowest home attendance: 30,397 vs Hoffenheim
- Average home league attendance: 41,518
Home colours	Away colours	Third colours

The 2012–13 1. FC Nürnberg season is the 113th season in the club's football history.

== Review and events ==
In 2012–13, the club plays in the Bundesliga, the top tier of German football. It is the clubs fourth consecutive season in this league, having been promoted from the 2. Bundesliga in 2009.

The club also took part in the 2012–13 edition of the DFB-Pokal, the German Cup, where it was knocked out by fourth division side TSV Havelse, losing 3–2 in extra time.

== Matches ==
=== Legend ===
Win Draw Loss Postponed

=== Friendly matches ===
29 June 2012	SSV Kasendorf	0–12	Nürnberg	Kasendorf
18:00 CEST (UTC+02)			17', 23' Polter; 47', 74' Wießmeier; 70', 85' Nilsson; 88', 88' Ngankam; 89' Esswein; 22' Gebhart; 80' Own Goal	Attendance: 3,500

5 July 2012	Eintracht Bamberg	0–4	Nürnberg	Bamberg
18:00 CEST (UTC+02)			4' Polter; 61' Kiyotake; 72' Ngankam; 82' Wießmeier	Stadium: Fuchs-Park Stadion; Attendance: 2,750

8 July 2012	Nürnberg	0–0	Karlsruhe	St. Gallen, Switzerland
16:00 CEST (UTC+02)				Stadium: AFG Arena

8 July 2012	St. Gallen	0–0	Nürnberg	St. Gallen, Switzerland
17:00 CEST (UTC+02)				Stadium: AFG Arena

14 July 2012	SSV Ulm 1846	2–3	Nürnberg	Ulm
16:00 CEST (UTC+02)	Braig 4'; Treske 26' (pen.)		33' Pinola; 60' Gebhart; 90' Mak	Stadium: Donaustadion; Attendance: 850

21 July 2012	Nürnberg	4–2	Borussia Dortmund	Nuremberg
16:00 CEST (UTC+02)	Balitsch 30'; Mintál 44' (pen.); Polter 70'; Frantz 88'		15' Kehl; 62' Błaszczykowski	Stadium: Frankenstadion; Attendance: 31,051; Referee: Aytekin (Oberasbach)

27 July 2012	Ingolstadt 04	2–2	Nürnberg	Ingolstadt
18:00 CEST (UTC+02)	Eigler 54', 67'		37' (pen.), 57' (pen.) Gebhart	Stadium: Audi Sportpark; Attendance: 4,250; Referee: Dietz

30 July 2012	Nürnberg	5–0	Sivasspor	Jenbach, Austria
17:00 CEST (UTC+02)	Simons 34' (pen.); Polter 39'; Balitsch 46'; Feulner 61'; Nilsson 68'			Stadium: Fußballplatz Jenbach; Attendance: 400

3 August 2012	Raika Längenfeld	0–12	Nürnberg	Längenfeld, Austria
18:00 CEST (UTC+02)			9', 15' Pekhart; 49', 73', 76' Wießmeier; 60', 67' (pen.) Cohen; 61', 79' Esswein; 69', 80' Klement; 88' Ngankam	Stadium: Fußballplatz Jenbach

10 August 2012	Real Betis	1–0	Nürnberg	Schweinfurt
19:00 CEST (UTC+02)	Molina 24'			Stadium: Willy-Sachs-Stadion; Attendance: 3,000; Referee: Petersen (Stuttgart)

=== Bundesliga ===
==== League results and fixtures ====
25 August 2012 1	Hamburg	0–1	Nürnberg	Hamburg
15:30 CEST (UTC+02)		Match Report	Balitsch 68'	Stadium: Volksparkstadion; Attendance: 50,123; Referee: Marco Fritz; Man of the Match: R. Adler

1 September 2012 2	Nürnberg	1–1	Borussia Dortmund	Nuremberg
15:30 CEST (UTC+02)	Pekhart 31'	Match Report	Błaszczykowski 40'	Stadium: Frankenstadion; Attendance: 50.000 (sell-out); Referee: Tobias Welz; Man of the Match: Gündoğan

15 September 2012 3	Borussia Mönchengladbach	2–3	Nürnberg	Mönchengladbach
15:30 CEST (UTC+02)	De Jong 45'; Xhaka 53'	Match Report	Klose 17'; Simons 25'; Kiyotake 55'	Stadium: Borussia-Park; Attendance: 52,195; Referee: Christian Dingert; Man of the Match: Kiyotake

21 September 2012 4	Nürnberg	1–2	Eintracht Frankfurt	Nuremberg
20:30 CEST (UTC+02)	Polter 76'	Match Report	Hoffer 25'; Inui 60'	Stadium: Frankenstadion; Attendance: 45,033; Referee: Felix Zwayer; Man of the Match: Rode

26 September 2012 5	Hannover 96	4–1	Nürnberg	Hannover
20:00 CEST (UTC+02)	Stindl 21'; Huszti 29'; Ya Konan 52', 64'	Match Report	Chandler 73'	Stadium: AWD-Arena; Attendance: 36,200; Referee: Daniel Siebert; Man of the Match: Huszti

29 September 2012 6	Nürnberg	0–2	VfB Stuttgart	Nuremberg
15:30 CEST (UTC+02)		Match Report	Ibišević 1'; Harnik 75'	Stadium: Frankenstadion; Attendance: 43,018; Referee: Florian Meyer; Man of the Match: Ibišević

6 October 2012 7	SC Freiburg	3–0	Nürnberg	Freiburg
15:30 CEST (UTC+02)	Makiadi 36'; D. Caligiuri 90' (pen.); Terrazzino 90'	Match Report		Stadium: Mage Solar Stadion; Attendance: 22,800; Referee: Michael Weiner; Man of the Match: Makiadi

21 October 2012 8	Nürnberg	0–0	Augsburg	Nuremberg
15:30 CEST (UTC+02)		Match Report		Stadium: Frankenstadion; Attendance: 40,171; Referee: Wolfgang Stark; Man of the Match: Baier

27 October 2012 9	Schalke 04	1–0	Nürnberg	Gelsenkirchen
15:30 CEST (UTC+02)	Farfán 77'	Match Report		Stadium: Veltins-Arena; Attendance: 61,673 (sell-out); Referee: Knut Kircher; Man of the Match: Fuchs

3 November 2012 10	Nürnberg	1–0	VfL Wolfsburg	Nuremberg
15:30	Gebhart 76'	Match Report		Stadium: Frankenstadion; Attendance: 37,586; Referee: Christian Dingert; Man of the Match: Gebhart

9 November 2012 11	Mainz 05	2–1	Nürnberg	Mainz
20:30	N. Müller 12'; Ivanschitz 21'	Match Report	Nilsson 40'	Stadium: Coface Arena; Attendance: 31,390; Referee: Thorsten Kinhöfer; Man of the Match: Kirchhoff

17 November 2012 12	Nürnberg	1–1	Bayern Munich	Nuremberg
15:30	Feulner 46'	Match Report	Mandžukić 3'	Stadium: Frankenstadion; Attendance: 50,000 (sell-out); Referee: Manuel Gräfe; Man of the Match: T. Klose

24 November 2012 13	Greuther Fürth	0–0	Nürnberg	Fürth
15:30		Match Report		Stadium: Trolli Arena; Attendance: 18,000 (sell-out); Referee: Felix Brych; Man of the Match: T. Klose

28 November 2013 14	Nürnberg	4–2	1899 Hoffenheim	Nuremberg
20:45	Kiyotake 6', 86'; Nilsson 43'; Polter 69'	Match Report	Schipplock 43'; Salihović 81' (pen.)	Stadium: Frankenstadion; Attendance: 30,397; Referee: Dr. Jochen Drees; Man of the Match: Kiyotake

1 December 2012 15	Bayer Leverkusen	1–0	Nürnberg	Leverkusen
15:30	Kießling 37'	Match Report		Stadium: BayArena; Attendance: 29,325; Referee: Markus Schmidt; Man of the Match: Reinartz

8 December 2012 16	Nürnberg	2–0	Fortuna Düsseldorf	Nuremberg
15:30	Polter 27'; Feulner 90'	Match Report		Stadium: Frankenstadion; Attendance: 37,041; Referee: Marco Fritz; Man of the Match: Feulner

16 December 2012 17	Werder Bremen	1–1	Nürnberg	Bremen
17:30	Petersen 88'	Match Report	Gebhart 82'	Stadium: Weserstadion; Attendance: 38,553; Referee: Manuel Gräfe; Man of the Match: Schäfer

20 January 2013 18	Nürnberg	1–1	Hamburg	Nuremberg
15:30	Pekhart 75'	Match Report	Rudņevs 70'	Stadium: Frankenstadion; Attendance: 42,601; Referee: Tobias Welz; Man of the Match: Schäfer

25 January 2013 19	Borussia Dortmund	3–0	Nürnberg	Dortmund
20:30	Błaszczykowski 18' (pen.), 21'; Lewandowski 88'	Match Report		Stadium: Westfalenstadion; Attendance: 80,100; Referee: Michael Weiner; Man of the Match: Błaszczykowski

3 February 2013 20	Nürnberg	2–1	Borussia Mönchengladbach	Nuremberg
15:30	Simons 4' (pen.); Pekhart 30'	Match Report	Herrmann 58'	Stadium: Frankenstadion; Attendance: 37,793; Referee: Florian Meyer; Man of the Match: Herrmann

9 February 2013 21	Eintracht Frankfurt	0–0	Nürnberg	Frankfurt
15:30		Match Report		Stadium: Commerzbank-Arena; Attendance: 45,400; Referee: Christian Dingert; Man of the Match: Trapp

17 February 2013 22	Nürnberg	2–2	Hannover 96	Nuremberg
15:30	Klose 53'; Polter 90'	Match Report	Huszti 41'; Ya Konan 68'	Stadium: Frankenstadion; Attendance: 36,101; Referee: Thorsten Kinhöfer; Man of the Match: Pinto

23 February 2013 23	VfB Stuttgart	1–1	Nürnberg	Stuttgart
15:30	Traoré 51'	Match Report	Feulner 77'	Stadium: Mercedes-Benz Arena; Attendance: 46,570; Referee: Tobias Stieler; Man of the Match: Schäfer

2 March 2013 24	Nürnberg	1–1	SC Freiburg	Nuremberg
15:30	Simons 33' (pen.)	Match Report	Schmid 83'	Stadium: Frankenstadion; Attendance: 38,188; Referee: Felix Zwayer; Man of the Match: Diagne

8 March 2013 25	Augsburg	1–2	Nürnberg	Augsburg
20:30	Werner 36'	Match Report	Kiyotake 21'; Esswein 54'	Stadium: SGL arena Attendance: 30,660 (sell-out); Referee: Günter Perl; Man of the Match: Esswein

16 March 2013 26	Nürnberg	3–0	Schalke 04	Nuremberg
15:30	Feulner 31'; Esswein 69'; Frantz 87'	Match Report		Stadium: Frankenstadion; Attendance: 46,055; Referee: Jochen Drees; Man of the Match: Esswein

31 March 2013 27	VfL Wolfsburg	2–2	Nürnberg	Wolfsburg
15:30	Diego 2'; Olić 27'	Match Report	Simons 61'; Nilsson 66'	Stadium: Volkswagen Arena; Attendance: 25,524; Referee: Thorsten Kinhöfer; Man of the Match: Simons

7 April 2013 28	Nürnberg	2–1	Mainz 05	Nuremberg
15:30	Nilsson 54', 69'	Match Report	N. Müller 60'	Stadium: Frankenstadion; Attendance: 35,082; Referee: Tobias Stieler; Man of the Match: Nilsson

13 April 2013 29	Bayern Munich	4–0	Nürnberg	Munich
15:30	Boateng 5'; Gómez 17'; Rafinha 24'; Shaqiri 56'	Match Report		Stadium: Allianz Arena; Attendance: 71,000 (sell-out); Referee: Michael Weiner; Man of the Match: Boateng

21 April 2013 30	Nürnberg	0–1	Greuther Fürth	Nuremberg
17:30		Match Report	Geis 27'	Stadium: Frankenstadion; Attendance: 50,000 (sell-out); Referee: Manuel Gräfe; Man of the Match: Geis

27 April 2013 31	1899 Hoffenheim	2–1	Nürnberg	Sinsheim
15:30	Weis 11'; Salihović 19'	Match Report	Simons 58' (pen.)	Stadium: Rhein-Neckar-Arena; Attendance: 28,675; Referee: Markus Schmidt; Man of the Match: Salihović

4 May 2013 32	Nürnberg	0–2	Bayer Leverkusen	Nuremberg
15:30		Match Report	Toprak 26'; Kießling 62' (pen.)	Stadium: Frankenstadion; Attendance: 40,581; Referee: Tobias Welz; Man of the Match: Toprak

11 May 2013 33	Fortuna Düsseldorf	1–2	Nürnberg	Düsseldorf
15:30	Balitsch 23' (ogg.)	Match Report	Mak 58'; Plattenhardt 64'	Stadium: Esprit Arena; Attendance: 53,500 (sell-out); Referee: Knut Kircher; Man of the Match: Mak

18 May 2013 34	Nürnberg	3–2	Werder Bremen	Nuremberg
15:30	Nilsson 61'; Polter 81'; Pekhart 88'	Match Report	De Bruyne 37', 89'	Stadium: Frankenstadion; Attendance: 46,157; Referee: Guido Winkmann

==== League table ====
===== Results summary =====
Overall								Home						Away					
Pld	W	D	L	GF	GA	GD	Pts	W	D	L	GF	GA	GD	W	D	L	GF	GA	GD
26	8	10	8	29	32	−3	34	5	6	2	19	13	+6	3	4	6	10	19	−9

Last updated: 19 March 2013.
Source: kicker

=== DFB-Pokal ===
19 August 2012 1	TSV Havelse	3–2 (a.e.t.)	Nürnberg	Garbsen
14:30 CEST (UTC+02)	Beismann 13'; Posipal 59'; Vučinović 97'		Esswein 7'; Mak 80'	Stadium: Willhelm-Langrehr-Stadion; Attendance: 3,506 (sell-out); Referee: Robert Kempter (Sauldorf)

=== Overall ===
Matches played	34
Matches won	10
Matches drawn	11
Matches lost	13
Goals scored	38
Goals conceded	48
Goal difference	−10
Clean sheets	7
Yellow cards	
Red cards	2
Best result(s)	3 – 0 (vs. Schalke 04)
Worst result(s)	0 – 4 (vs. Bayern Munich)
Points earned	41/102 (34.50%)

== Squad ==
=== Squad and statistics ===
Squad Season 2012–13 Sources:
Player					Bundesliga		DFB-Pokal		Totals	
Player	Nat.	Birthday	at FCN since	Previous club	Matches	Goals	Matches	Goal	Matches	Goals
Goalkeepers
Raphael Schäfer	(Germany)	30 January 1979	2008	VfB Stuttgart	31	0	1	0	32	0
Patrick Rakovsky	(Germany)	2 June 1993	2011	Schalke 04 youth	4	0	0	0	4	0
Defenders
Per Nilsson	(Sweden)	15 September 1982	2010	1899 Hoffenheim	29	6	0	0	29	6
Marcos António	(Brazil)	25 May 1983	2012	Rapid București	1	0	1	0	2	0
Timm Klose	(Switzerland)	9 May 1988	2011	Thun	32	2	1	0	33	2
Noah Korczowski	(Germany)	8 January 1994	2012	Schalke 04 youth	3	0	0	0	3	0
Marvin Plattenhardt	(Germany)	26 January 1992	2010	Nürnberg II	14	1	0	0	14	1
Berkay Dabanli	(Germany)	27 June 1990	2013	Kayserispor	8	0	0	0	8	0
Javier Pinola	(Argentina)	24 February 1983	2005	Racing Club	28	0	1	0	29	0
Timothy Chandler	(United States)	29 March 1990	2010	Eintracht Frankfurt	30	1	1	0	31	1
Midfielders
Timmy Simons	(Belgium)	11 December 1976	2010	PSV	34	5	1	0	35	5
Hanno Balitsch	(Germany)	2 January 1981	2012	Bayer Leverkusen	33	1	1	0	34	1
Markus Feulner	(Germany)	12 February 1982	2011	Borussia Dortmund	23	4	0	0	23	4
Timo Gebhart	(Germany)	12 April 1989	2013	VfB Stuttgart	18	2	1	0	19	2
Hiroshi Kiyotake	(Japan)	12 November 1989	2012	Cerezo Osaka	31	4	1	0	32	4
Róbert Mak	(Slovakia)	8 March 1991	2010	Manchester City	19	1	1	1	20	2
Mike Frantz	(Germany)	14 October 1986	2008	Saarbrücken	27	1	1	0	28	1
Almog Cohen	(Israel)	1 September 1988	2010	Maccabi Netanya	9	0	0	0	9	0
Muhammed Ildiz	(Austria)	14 May 1991	2013	Rapid Wien	5	0	0	0	5	0
Markus Mendler	(Germany)	7 January 1993	2010	Nürnberg youth	3	0	0	0	3	0
Mu Kanazaki	(Japan)	16 February 1989	2013	Nagoya Grampus Eight	4	0	0	0	4	0
Niklas Stark	(Germany)	14 April 1995	2013	Nürnberg youth	3	0	0	0	3	0
Forwards
Sebastian Polter	(Germany)	1 April 1991	2012	VfL Wolfsburg	26	5	1	0	27	5
Tomáš Pekhart	(Czech Republic)	26 May 1989	2011	Baumit Jablonec	31	4	1	0	32	4
Alexander Esswein	(Germany)	25 March 1990	2011	Dynamo Dresden	27	2	1	1	28	3
