= Aleksandar Ignjovski =

Serbian footballer (born 1991)

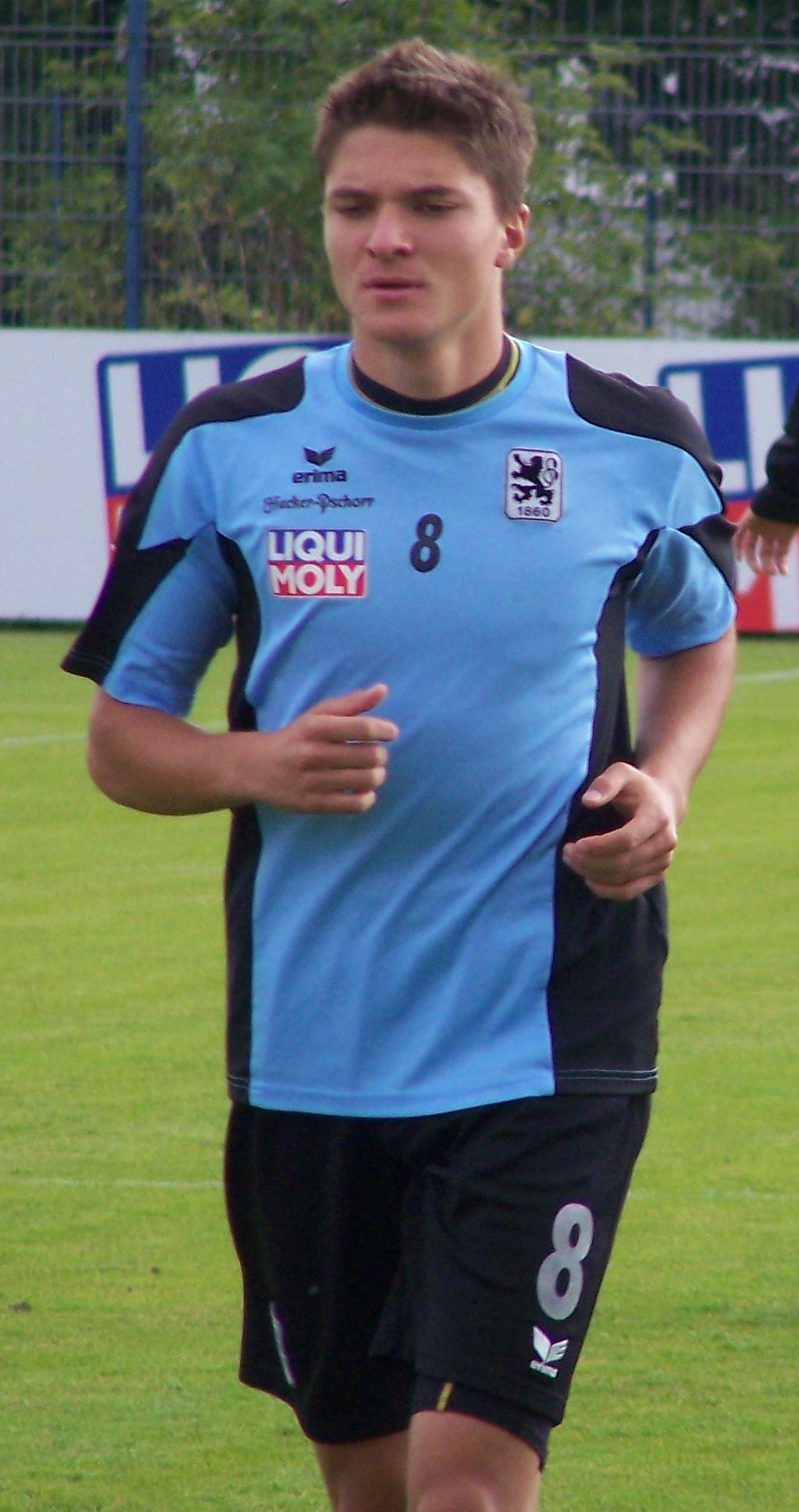
- Ignjovski with 1860 Munich in 2009

Personal information
- Date of birth: 27 January 1991 (age 35)
- Place of birth: Pančevo, SR Serbia, Yugoslavia
- Height: 1.76 m (5 ft 9 in)
- Positions: Defensive midfielder; right-back

Youth career
- 1998–2008: OFK Beograd

Senior career*
Years	Team	Apps	(Gls)
2008–2011	OFK Beograd	23	(3)
2009–2011	→ 1860 Munich (loan)	53	(0)
2011–2014	Werder Bremen	60	(1)
2014–2016	Eintracht Frankfurt	38	(0)
2016–2018	SC Freiburg	19	(0)
2018–2019	1. FC Magdeburg	17	(0)
2019–2023	Holstein Kiel	45	(0)
Total		255	(4)

International career^{‡}
2009–2011	Serbia U21	10	(1)
2012–2016	Serbia	12	(0)
- * Club domestic league appearances and goals as of 5 July 2023 ‡ National team caps and goals as of 13:26, 29 July 2020 (UTC)

Aleksandar Ignjovski (Serbian Cyrillic: Александар Игњовски; born 27 January 1991) is a Serbian retired footballer who plays as a defensive midfielder or right-back.

== Club career ==
Born in Belgrade, SR Serbia, SFR Yugoslavia, Ignjovski played in his first season as senior in 2008 for the Serbian SuperLiga club OFK Beograd, playing twenty three games and scoring three goals during that season. On 8 July 2009, he was loaned to 2. Bundesliga club TSV 1860 Munich.

At the end of the loan, Ignjovski returned to Belgrade before signing for Werder Bremen. On 1 April 2014, he stated his decision not renew his contract at the club. In this time at Werder Bremen, he made 60 league appearances scoring 1 goal.

On 3 April 2014, it was announced that Ignjovski had signed a three-year contract with Eintracht Frankfurt with effect from the season 2014–15, where he was reunited with his former manager at Werder, Thomas Schaaf. He made his debut for Frankfurt 23 August 2014 in a 1–0 win against SC Freiburg.

In June 2016, Ignjovski signed for SC Freiburg. He made his league debut for Freiburg on 28 August 2016 in a 2–1 loss to Hertha Berlin being replaced by Onur Bulut in the 66th minute.

On 21 July 2019, Ignjovski joined Holstein Kiel on a two-year deal.

== International career ==
Ignjovski was a member of Serbian U-21 team from 2009. Due to his Macedonian background, in March 2010 Macedonia national team coach Mirsad Jonuz officially stated his desire to have him play for Macedonia however this never materialised. Instead, he made his debut for the Serbia national team on 28 February 2012 in Larnaca, Cyprus, in a friendly match against Armenia. His final international was a November 2016 friendly match against Ukraine.

== Career statistics ==
=== Club ===
As of match played 5 July 2023

Appearances and goals by club, season and competition
Club	Season	League			Cup		Continental		Other		Total	
Club	Season	Division	Apps	Goals	Apps	Goals	Apps	Goals	Apps	Goals	Apps	Goals
OFK Beograd	2008–09	Superliga Srbije	23	3	0	0	0	0	0	0	23	3
1860 Munich (loan)	2009–10	2. Bundesliga	30	0	2	0	0	0	0	0	32	0
1860 Munich (loan)	2010–11	2. Bundesliga	23	0	2	0	0	0	0	0	25	0
1860 Munich (loan)	Total		53	0	4	0	0	0	0	0	57	0
Werder Bremen	2011–12	Bundesliga	26	0	0	0	0	0	0	0	26	0
Werder Bremen	2012–13	Bundesliga	20	1	1	0	0	0	0	0	21	1
Werder Bremen	2013–14	Bundesliga	14	0	0	0	0	0	0	0	14	0
Werder Bremen	Total		60	1	1	0	0	0	0	0	61	1
Eintracht Frankfurt	2014–15	Bundesliga	20	0	2	0	0	0	0	0	22	0
Eintracht Frankfurt	2015–16	Bundesliga	18	0	0	0	0	0	1 (Note: Appearance in the Bundesliga relegation play-offs)	0	19	0
Eintracht Frankfurt	Total		38	0	2	0	0	0	1	0	41	0
Freiburg	2016–17	Bundesliga	19	0	2	0	—		—		21	0
Freiburg	2017–18	Bundesliga	0	0	0	0	1 (Note: Appearance in the UEFA Europa League)	0	—		1	0
Freiburg	Total		19	0	2	0	1	0	0	0	22	0
1. FC Magdeburg	2018–19	2. Bundesliga	17	0	0	0	—		—		17	0
Holstein Kiel	2019–20	2. Bundesliga	21	0	1	0	—		—		22	0
Holstein Kiel	2020–21	2. Bundesliga	10	0	1	0	—		1 (Note: Appearance in promotion play-offs)	0	12	0
Holstein Kiel	2021–22	2. Bundesliga	5	0	0	0	—		—		5	0
Holstein Kiel	2022–23	2. Bundesliga	9	0	0	0	—		—		9	0
Holstein Kiel	Total		45	0	2	0	0	0	1	0	48	0
Career total			255	4	11	0	1	0	2	0	269	4

=== International ===
As of 29 July 2020

Appearances and goals by national team and year
National team	Year	Apps	Goals
Serbia	2012	10	0
Serbia	2013	1	0
Serbia	2014	0	0
Serbia	2015	0	0
Serbia	2016	1	0
Total		12	0
