= 2015–16 Bundesliga =

53rd season of the Bundesliga

Bundesliga
- Season: 2015–16
- Dates: 14 August 2015 – 14 May 2016
- Champions: Bayern Munich; 25th Bundesliga title 26th German title
- Relegated: VfB Stuttgart; Hannover 96
- Champions League: Bayern Munich; Borussia Dortmund; Bayer Leverkusen; Borussia Mönchengladbach
- Europa League: Schalke 04; Mainz 05; Hertha BSC
- Matches: 306
- Goals: 866 (2.83 per match)
- Top goalscorer: Robert Lewandowski (30 goals)
- Biggest home win: VfL Wolfsburg 6–0 Werder Bremen
- Biggest away win: Eintracht Frankfurt 1–5 Borussia Mönchengladbach; Darmstadt 98 0–4 Hertha BSC
- Highest scoring: Eintracht Frankfurt 6–2 1. FC Köln; Werder Bremen 6–2 VfB Stuttgart
- Longest winning run: 10 matches Bayern Munich
- Longest unbeaten run: 15 matches Borussia Dortmund
- Longest winless run: 9 matches VfB Stuttgart
- Longest losing run: 8 matches Hannover 96
- Highest attendance: 81,359; Borussia Dortmund 4–0 Borussia Mönchengladbach (15 August 2015)
- Lowest attendance: 13,500; FC Ingolstadt 1–0 Mainz 05
- Average attendance: 43,309

The 2015–16 Bundesliga was the 53rd season of the Bundesliga, Germany's premier football competition. The season started on 14 August 2015 and ended on 14 May 2016. Bayern Munich were the defending champions, after winning their 24th Bundesliga title and 25th German championship overall in the previous season.

Bayern Munich won the 2015–16 title in the second-last round on 7 May 2016, thereby becoming the first club in the history of the Bundesliga and the German football championship to win four consecutive championships.

== Teams ==
Locations of the 2015–16 Bundesliga teams

A total of 18 teams were participating in this year's edition of the Bundesliga. Of these, 15 sides qualified directly from the 2014–15 season and the two sides were directly promoted from the 2014–15 2. Bundesliga season: FC Ingolstadt, the champions, and Darmstadt 98, the runners-up. The final participant was decided by a two-legged play-off, in which the 16th-placed Bundesliga club, Hamburger SV, defeated the third-place finisher in the 2. Bundesliga, Karlsruher SC.

=== Stadiums and locations ===
Team	Location	Stadium	Capacity	Ref.
FC Augsburg	Augsburg	WWK ARENA	30,660	
Bayer Leverkusen	Leverkusen	BayArena	30,210	
Bayern Munich	Munich	Allianz Arena	75,000	
Borussia Dortmund	Dortmund	Signal Iduna Park	81,359	
Borussia Mönchengladbach	Mönchengladbach	Stadion im Borussia-Park	54,010	
Darmstadt 98	Darmstadt	Merck-Stadion am Böllenfalltor	17,000	
Eintracht Frankfurt	Frankfurt	Commerzbank-Arena	51,500	
Hamburger SV	Hamburg	Volksparkstadion	57,000	
Hannover 96	Hanover	HDI-Arena	49,000	
Hertha BSC	Berlin	Olympiastadion	74,475	
1899 Hoffenheim	Sinsheim	Wirsol Rhein-Neckar-Arena	30,150	
FC Ingolstadt	Ingolstadt	Audi Sportpark	15,000	
1. FC Köln	Cologne	RheinEnergieSTADION	50,000	
Mainz 05	Mainz	Coface Arena	34,000	
Schalke 04	Gelsenkirchen	Veltins-Arena	62,271	
VfB Stuttgart	Stuttgart	Mercedes-Benz Arena	60,441	
Werder Bremen	Bremen	Weserstadion	42,100	
VfL Wolfsburg	Wolfsburg	Volkswagen Arena	30,000	

=== Personnel and kits ===
Team	Manager		Captain		Kit manufacturer	Shirt sponsor	Ref.
FC Augsburg	(Germany)	Markus Weinzierl	(Netherlands)	Paul Verhaegh	Nike	WWK	
Bayer Leverkusen	(Germany)	Roger Schmidt	(Germany)	Lars Bender	Adidas	LG Electronics	
Bayern Munich	(Spain)	Pep Guardiola	(Germany)	Philipp Lahm	Adidas	Deutsche Telekom	
Borussia Dortmund	(Germany)	Thomas Tuchel	(Germany)	Mats Hummels	Puma	Evonik	
Borussia Mönchengladbach	(Germany)	André Schubert	(Switzerland)	Granit Xhaka	Kappa	Postbank	
Darmstadt 98	(Germany)	Dirk Schuster	(Turkey)	Aytaç Sulu	Jako	Software AG	
Eintracht Frankfurt	(Croatia)	Niko Kovač	(Germany)	Alexander Meier	Nike	Alfa Romeo	
Hamburger SV	(Germany)	Bruno Labbadia	(Switzerland)	Johan Djourou	Adidas	Fly Emirates	
Hannover 96	(Germany)	Daniel Stendel	(Germany)	Christian Schulz	Jako	Heinz von Heiden	
Hertha BSC	(Hungary)	Pál Dárdai	(Switzerland)	Fabian Lustenberger	Nike	bet-at-home.com	
1899 Hoffenheim	(Germany)	Julian Nagelsmann	(Switzerland)	Pirmin Schwegler	Lotto	SAP	
FC Ingolstadt	(Austria)	Ralph Hasenhüttl	(Cameroon)	Marvin Matip	Adidas	Media Markt	
1. FC Köln	(Austria)	Peter Stöger	(Germany)	Matthias Lehmann	Erima	REWE	
Mainz 05	(Switzerland)	Martin Schmidt	(Austria)	Julian Baumgartlinger	Lotto	Kömmerling	
Schalke 04	(Germany)	André Breitenreiter	(Germany)	Benedikt Höwedes	Adidas	Gazprom	
VfB Stuttgart	(Germany)	Jürgen Kramny	(Germany)	Christian Gentner	Puma	Mercedes-Benz Bank	
Werder Bremen	(Ukraine)	Viktor Skrypnyk	(Germany)	Clemens Fritz	Nike	Wiesenhof	
VfL Wolfsburg	(Germany)	Dieter Hecking	(Switzerland)	Diego Benaglio	Kappa	Volkswagen	

== Managerial changes ==
Team	Outgoing	Manner	Exit date		Position in table	Incoming	Incoming date		Ref.
Team	Outgoing	Manner	Announced on	Departed on	Position in table	Incoming	Announced on	Arrived on	Ref.
Borussia Dortmund	(Germany) Jürgen Klopp	Resigned	15 April 2015	30 June 2015	Pre-season	(Germany) Thomas Tuchel	19 April 2015	1 July 2015	
VfB Stuttgart	(Netherlands) Huub Stevens	End of contract	24 May 2015	30 June 2015	Pre-season	(Germany) Alexander Zorniger	25 May 2015	1 July 2015	
Schalke 04	(Italy) Roberto Di Matteo	Resigned	26 May 2015	30 June 2015	Pre-season	(Germany) André Breitenreiter	12 June 2015	1 July 2015	
Eintracht Frankfurt	(Germany) Thomas Schaaf	Resigned	26 May 2015	30 June 2015	Pre-season	(Germany) Armin Veh	14 June 2015	1 July 2015	
Borussia Mönchengladbach	(Switzerland) Lucien Favre	Resigned	20 September 2015		18th	(Germany) André Schubert (Note: Schubert was initially appointed as interim coach, but the move was made permanent on 13 November 2015.)	21 September 2015		
1899 Hoffenheim	(Germany) Markus Gisdol	Sacked	26 October 2015		17th	(Netherlands) Huub Stevens	26 October 2015		
VfB Stuttgart	(Germany) Alexander Zorniger	Sacked	24 November 2015		16th	(Germany) Jürgen Kramny	24 November 2015		
Hannover 96	(Germany) Michael Frontzeck	Resigned	21 December 2015		17th	(Germany) Thomas Schaaf	28 December 2015	4 January 2016	
1899 Hoffenheim	(Netherlands) Huub Stevens	Resigned	10 February 2016		17th	(Germany) Julian Nagelsmann	11 February 2016		
Eintracht Frankfurt	(Germany) Armin Veh	Sacked	6 March 2016		16th	(Croatia) Niko Kovač	8 March 2016		
Hannover 96	(Germany) Thomas Schaaf	Sacked	3 April 2016		18th	(Germany) Daniel Stendel	3 April 2016		

== League table ==
Pos	Team	Pld	W	D	L	GF	GA	GD	Pts	Qualification or relegation
1	Bayern Munich (C)	34	28	4	2	80	17	+63	88	Qualification for the Champions League group stage
2	Borussia Dortmund	34	24	6	4	82	34	+48	78	Qualification for the Champions League group stage
3	Bayer Leverkusen	34	18	6	10	56	40	+16	60	Qualification for the Champions League group stage
4	Borussia Mönchengladbach	34	17	4	13	67	50	+17	55	Qualification for the Champions League play-off round
5	Schalke 04	34	15	7	12	51	49	+2	52	Qualification for the Europa League group stage (Note: Since the winners of the 2015–16 DFB-Pokal, Bayern Munich, qualified for the Champions League based on league position, the Europa League group stage spot was passed to the sixth-placed team, Mainz 05; and the Europa League third qualifying round spot was passed to the seventh-placed team, Hertha BSC.)
6	Mainz 05	34	14	8	12	46	42	+4	50	Qualification for the Europa League group stage
7	Hertha BSC	34	14	8	12	42	42	0	50	Qualification for the Europa League third qualifying round
8	VfL Wolfsburg	34	12	9	13	47	49	−2	45	
9	1. FC Köln	34	10	13	11	38	42	−4	43	
10	Hamburger SV	34	11	8	15	40	46	−6	41	
11	FC Ingolstadt	34	10	10	14	33	42	−9	40	
12	FC Augsburg	34	9	11	14	42	52	−10	38	
13	Werder Bremen	34	10	8	16	50	65	−15	38	
14	Darmstadt 98	34	9	11	14	38	53	−15	38	
15	1899 Hoffenheim	34	9	10	15	39	54	−15	37	
16	Eintracht Frankfurt (O)	34	9	9	16	34	52	−18	36	Qualification for the relegation play-offs
17	VfB Stuttgart (R)	34	9	6	19	50	75	−25	33	Relegation to 2. Bundesliga
18	Hannover 96 (R)	34	7	4	23	31	62	−31	25	Relegation to 2. Bundesliga

Source: DFB
Rules for classification: 1) Points; 2) Goal difference; 3) Goals scored; 4) Head-to-head points; 5) Head-to-head goal difference; 6) Head-to-head away goals scored; 7) Away goals scored; 8) Play-offs.
(C) Champions; (O) Play-off winners; (R) Relegated

== Results ==
Home \ Away	FCA	BSC	SVW	D98	BVB	SGE	HSV	H96	TSG	FCI	KOE	B04	M05	BMG	FCB	S04	VFB	WOB
FC Augsburg	—	0–1	1–2	0–2	1–3	0–0	1–3	2–0	1–3	0–1	0–0	3–3	3–3	2–2	1–3	2–1	1–0	0–0
Hertha BSC	0–0	—	1–1	1–2	0–0	2–0	3–0	2–2	1–0	2–1	2–0	2–1	2–0	1–4	0–2	2–0	2–1	1–1
Werder Bremen	1–2	3–3	—	2–2	1–3	1–0	1–3	4–1	1–1	0–1	1–1	0–3	1–1	2–1	0–1	0–3	6–2	3–2
Darmstadt 98	2–2	0–4	2–1	—	0–2	1–2	1–1	2–2	0–0	2–0	0–0	1–2	2–3	0–2	0–3	0–2	2–2	0–1
Borussia Dortmund	5–1	3–1	3–2	2–2	—	4–1	3–0	1–0	3–1	2–0	2–2	3–0	2–0	4–0	0–0	3–2	4–1	5–1
Eintracht Frankfurt	1–1	1–1	2–1	0–1	1–0	—	0–0	1–0	0–2	1–1	6–2	1–3	2–1	1–5	0–0	0–0	2–4	3–2
Hamburger SV	0–1	2–0	2–1	1–2	3–1	0–0	—	1–2	1–3	1–1	1–1	0–0	1–3	3–2	1–2	0–1	3–2	0–1
Hannover 96	0–1	1–3	1–0	1–2	2–4	1–2	0–3	—	1–0	4–0	0–2	0–1	0–1	2–0	0–1	1–3	1–3	0–4
1899 Hoffenheim	2–1	2–1	1–3	0–2	1–1	0–0	0–1	1–0	—	2–1	1–1	1–1	3–2	3–3	1–2	1–4	2–2	1–0
FC Ingolstadt	2–1	0–1	2–0	3–1	0–4	2–0	0–1	2–2	1–1	—	1–1	0–1	1–0	1–0	1–2	3–0	3–3	0–0
1. FC Köln	0–1	0–1	0–0	4–1	2–1	3–1	2–1	0–1	0–0	1–1	—	0–2	0–0	1–0	0–1	1–3	1–3	1–1
Bayer Leverkusen	1–1	2–1	1–4	0–1	0–1	3–0	1–0	3–0	2–1	3–2	1–2	—	1–0	5–0	0–0	1–1	4–3	3–0
Mainz 05	4–2	0–0	1–3	0–0	0–2	2–1	0–0	3–0	3–1	0–1	2–3	3–1	—	1–0	0–3	2–1	0–0	2–0
Borussia Mönchengladbach	4–2	5–0	5–1	3–2	1–3	3–0	0–3	2–1	3–1	0–0	1–0	2–1	1–2	—	3–1	3–1	4–0	2–0
Bayern Munich	2–1	2–0	5–0	3–1	5–1	1–0	5–0	3–1	2–0	2–0	4–0	3–0	1–2	1–1	—	3–0	4–0	5–1
Schalke 04	1–1	2–1	1–3	1–1	2–2	2–0	3–2	3–1	1–0	1–1	0–3	2–3	2–1	2–1	1–3	—	1–1	3–0
VfB Stuttgart	0–4	2–0	1–1	2–0	0–3	1–4	2–1	1–2	5–1	1–0	1–3	0–2	1–3	1–3	1–3	0–1	—	3–1
VfL Wolfsburg	0–2	2–0	6–0	1–1	1–2	2–1	1–1	1–1	4–2	2–0	1–1	2–1	1–1	2–1	0–2	3–0	3–1	—

Source: DFB
Legend: Blue = home team win; Yellow = draw; Red = away team win.

== Relegation play-offs ==
The team which finished 16th faced the third-placed 2015–16 2. Bundesliga side for a two-legged play-off. The winner on aggregate score after both matches will earn entry into the 2016–17 Bundesliga.

=== First leg ===
19 May 2016
20:30 CEST

Eintracht Frankfurt	1–1	1. FC Nürnberg
Gaćinović 65'	Report	Russ 42' (o.g.)

Commerzbank-Arena, Frankfurt
Attendance: 51,500
Referee: Daniel Siebert (Berlin)

Eintracht Frankfurt	1. FC Nürnberg

GK	1	(Finland) Lukáš Hrádecký
RB	22	(United States) Timothy Chandler
CB	19	(Argentina) David Abraham
CB	4	(Germany) Marco Russ (c)	(yellow card) 56'
LB	6	(Germany) Bastian Oczipka
CM	20	(Japan) Makoto Hasebe
CM	8	(Hungary) Szabolcs Huszti
RW	16	(Germany) Stefan Aigner		(substituted off) 61'
AM	14	(Germany) Alexander Meier		(substituted off) 70'
LW	11	(Serbia) Mijat Gaćinović		(substituted off) 84'
CF	9	(Switzerland) Haris Seferovic
Substitutes:
GK	13	(Austria) Heinz Lindner
DF	2	(Germany) Yanni Regäsel
DF	5	(Peru) Carlos Zambrano
MF	21	(Germany) Marc Stendera		(substituted on) 70'
MF	27	(Serbia) Aleksandar Ignjovski
MF	32	(Tunisia) Änis Ben-Hatira		(substituted on) 61'
FW	30	(Netherlands) Luc Castaignos		(substituted on) 84'
Manager:
(Croatia) Niko Kovač

GK	1	(Germany) Raphael Schäfer	(yellow card) 57'
RB	2	(Slovenia) Mišo Brečko (c)
CB	33	(Austria) Georg Margreitter
CB	4	(Netherlands) Dave Bulthuis
LB	6	(Romania) László Sepsi
RM	17	(Germany) Sebastian Kerk		(substituted off) 74'
CM	31	(Czech Republic) Ondřej Petrák
CM	18	(Germany) Hanno Behrens
LM	23	(Germany) Tim Leibold		(substituted off) 89'
CF	24	(Germany) Niclas Füllkrug		(substituted off) 85'
CF	9	(Austria) Guido Burgstaller
Substitutes:
GK	22	(Germany) Patrick Rakovsky
DF	3	(Norway) Even Hovland		(substituted on) 85'
DF	28	(Germany) Lukas Mühl
MF	14	(Germany) Kevin Möhwald
MF	19	(Iceland) Rúrik Gíslason		(substituted on) 89'
FW	7	(Germany) Danny Blum		(substituted on) 74'
FW	36	(Germany) Cedric Teuchert
Manager:
(Switzerland) René Weiler

Assistant referees:
Florian Heft (Neuenkirchen)
Jan Seidel (Oberkrämer)
Fourth official:
Bibiana Steinhaus (Hanover)

Match rules:

- 90 minutes.
- Seven named substitutes, of which up to three may be used.

=== Second leg ===
23 May 2016
20:30 CEST

1. FC Nürnberg	0–1	Eintracht Frankfurt
	Report	Seferovic 66'

Grundig Stadion, Nuremberg
Attendance: 50,000
Referee: Christian Dingert (Lebecksmühle)

1. FC Nürnberg	Eintracht Frankfurt

GK	1	(Germany) Raphael Schäfer
RB	2	(Slovenia) Mišo Brečko (c)	(yellow card) 72'
CB	33	(Austria) Georg Margreitter
CB	4	(Netherlands) Dave Bulthuis
LB	6	(Romania) László Sepsi		(substituted off) 84'
RM	17	(Germany) Sebastian Kerk	(yellow card) 56'	(substituted off) 74'
CM	31	(Czech Republic) Ondřej Petrák		(substituted off) 74'
CM	18	(Germany) Hanno Behrens
LM	23	(Germany) Tim Leibold
CF	9	(Austria) Guido Burgstaller	(yellow card) 90+2'
CF	24	(Germany) Niclas Füllkrug
Substitutes:
GK	22	(Germany) Patrick Rakovsky
DF	3	(Norway) Even Hovland		(substituted on) 84'
DF	28	(Germany) Lukas Mühl
MF	14	(Germany) Kevin Möhwald
MF	19	(Iceland) Rúrik Gíslason		(substituted on) 74'
FW	7	(Germany) Danny Blum		(substituted on) 74'
FW	36	(Germany) Cedric Teuchert
Manager:
(Switzerland) René Weiler

GK	1	(Finland) Lukáš Hrádecký	(yellow card) 90+1'
RB	22	(United States) Timothy Chandler		(substituted off) 69'
CB	5	(Peru) Carlos Zambrano (c)
CB	19	(Argentina) David Abraham	(yellow card) 90+4'
LB	6	(Germany) Bastian Oczipka	(yellow card) 24'
CM	20	(Japan) Makoto Hasebe
CM	8	(Hungary) Szabolcs Huszti
RW	32	(Tunisia) Änis Ben-Hatira		(substituted off) 58'
AM	21	(Germany) Marc Stendera		(substituted off) 11'
LW	11	(Serbia) Mijat Gaćinović
CF	9	(Switzerland) Haris Seferovic	(yellow card) 76'
Substitutes:
GK	13	(Austria) Heinz Lindner
DF	2	(Germany) Yanni Regäsel
MF	10	(Mexico) Marco Fabián	(yellow card) 51'	(substituted on) 11'
MF	16	(Germany) Stefan Aigner
MF	27	(Serbia) Aleksandar Ignjovski		(substituted on) 69'
FW	14	(Germany) Alexander Meier		(substituted on) 58'
FW	30	(Netherlands) Luc Castaignos
Manager:
(Croatia) Niko Kovač

Assistant referees:
Tobias Christ (Münchweiler an der Rodalb)
Arne Aarnink (Nordhorn)
Fourth official:
Bastian Dankert (Rostock)

Match rules:

- 90 minutes.
- 30 minutes of extra time if tied on aggregate and away goals.
- Penalty shoot-out if no further goals are scored.
- Seven named substitutes, of which up to three may be used.

Eintracht Frankfurt won 2–1 on aggregate.

== Season statistics ==
=== Top goalscorers ===
Rank	Player	Club	Goals
1	(Poland) Robert Lewandowski	Bayern Munich	30
2	(Gabon) Pierre-Emerick Aubameyang	Borussia Dortmund	25
3	(Germany) Thomas Müller	Bayern Munich	20
4	(Mexico) Javier Hernández	Bayer Leverkusen	17
5	(France) Anthony Modeste	1. FC Köln	15
6	(Ivory Coast) Salomon Kalou	Hertha BSC	14
6	(Peru) Claudio Pizarro	Werder Bremen	14
6	(Germany) Sandro Wagner	Darmstadt 98	14
9	(Germany) Daniel Didavi	VfB Stuttgart	13
9	(Brazil) Raffael	Borussia Mönchengladbach	13

=== Hat-tricks ===
Player	Club	Against	Result	Date
(Germany) Alexander Meier	Eintracht Frankfurt	1. FC Köln	6–2	12 September 2015
(Turkey) Yunus Mallı	Mainz 05	1899 Hoffenheim	3–1	18 September 2015
(Poland) Robert Lewandowski^{5}	Bayern Munich	VfL Wolfsburg	5–1	22 September 2015
(Germany) Max Kruse	VfL Wolfsburg	1899 Hoffenheim	4–2	17 October 2015
(Gabon) Pierre-Emerick Aubameyang	Borussia Dortmund	FC Augsburg	5–1	25 October 2015
(Japan) Yoshinori Muto	Mainz 05	FC Augsburg	3–3	31 October 2015
(Ivory Coast) Salomon Kalou	Hertha BSC	Hannover 96	3–1	6 November 2015
(Mexico) Javier Hernández	Bayer Leverkusen	Borussia Mönchengladbach	5–0	12 December 2015
(Germany) Alexander Meier	Eintracht Frankfurt	VfL Wolfsburg	3–2	24 January 2016
(Germany) André Schürrle	VfL Wolfsburg	Hannover 96	4–0	1 March 2016
(Peru) Claudio Pizarro	Werder Bremen	Bayer Leverkusen	4–1	2 March 2016
(South Korea) Koo Ja-cheol	FC Augsburg	Bayer Leverkusen	3–3	5 March 2016

^{5} Player scored five goals

== Awards ==
=== Player of the Month ===
Month	Player	Team	Ref.
August	(Brazil) Douglas Costa	Bayern Munich	
September	(Poland) Robert Lewandowski	Bayern Munich	
October	(Gabon) Pierre-Emerick Aubameyang	Borussia Dortmund	
November	(Mexico) Javier Hernández	Bayer Leverkusen	
December	(Mexico) Javier Hernández	Bayer Leverkusen	
January	(Mexico) Javier Hernández	Bayer Leverkusen	
February	(Poland) Robert Lewandowski	Bayern Munich	
March	(Germany) André Schürrle	VfL Wolfsburg	
April	(Armenia) Henrikh Mkhitaryan	Borussia Dortmund	
May	(Poland) Robert Lewandowski	Bayern Munich	

=== Individual Awards ===
Team of the Year
Goalkeeper	(Germany) Manuel Neuer (Bayern Munich)			
Defenders	(Poland) Łukasz Piszczek (Borussia Dortmund)	(Germany) Jérôme Boateng (Bayern Munich)	(Germany) Mats Hummels (Borussia Dortmund)	(Austria) David Alaba (Bayern Munich)
Midfielders	(Chile) Arturo Vidal (Bayern Munich)	(Germany) Marco Reus (Borussia Dortmund)	(Japan) Shinji Kagawa (Borussia Dortmund)	(Armenia) Henrikh Mkhitaryan (Borussia Dortmund)
Forwards	(Poland) Robert Lewandowski (Bayern Munich)	(Mexico) Javier Hernández (Bayer Leverkusen)		

== Attendances ==
Rank	Team	Home games	Average attendance
1	Borussia Dortmund	17	81,178
2	Bayern München	17	75,000
3	Schalke 04	17	61,386
4	Hamburger SV	17	53,700
5	VfB Stuttgart	17	51,983
6	Borussia Mönchengladbach	17	51,715
7	Hertha BSC	17	49,704
8	1. FC Köln	17	48,676
9	Eintracht Frankfurt	17	46,676
10	Hannover 96	17	41,246
11	Werder Bremen	17	40,935
12	Mainz 05	17	31,053
13	Bayer Leverkusen	17	29,085
14	FC Augsburg	17	29,017
15	VfL Wolfsburg	17	28,945
16	TSG Hoffenheim	17	27,615
17	Darmstadt 98	17	16,647
18	FC Ingolstadt	17	14,834
