= Haris Seferovic =

Swiss footballer (born 1992)

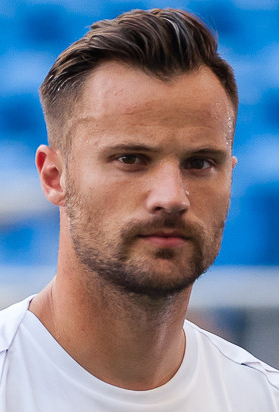
- Seferovic training with Switzerland at the 2018 FIFA World Cup

Personal information
- Full name: Haris Seferovic
- Date of birth: 22 February 1992 (age 34)
- Place of birth: Sursee, Switzerland
- Height: 1.89 m (6 ft 2 in)
- Position: Striker

Team information
- Current team: United
- Number: 9

Youth career
- 1999–2004: FC Sursee
- 2004–2007: FC Luzern
- 2007–2009: Grasshopper

Senior career*
| Years | Team | Apps | (Gls) |
| 2009–2010 | Grasshopper | 3 | (0) |
| 2010–2013 | Fiorentina | 8 | (0) |
| 2011–2012 | → Neuchâtel Xamax (loan) | 10 | (2) |
| 2012 | → Lecce (loan) | 5 | (0) |
| 2013 | → Novara (loan) | 18 | (10) |
| 2013–2014 | Real Sociedad | 24 | (2) |
| 2014–2017 | Eintracht Frankfurt | 86 | (16) |
| 2017–2023 | Benfica | 120 | (57) |
| 2022–2023 | → Galatasaray (loan) | 10 | (0) |
| 2023 | → Celta Vigo (loan) | 18 | (3) |
| 2023–2025 | Al Wasl | 36 | (13) |
| 2025 | Al-Nasr | 12 | (2) |
| 2025– | United | 1 | (1) |

International career
| 2007–2010 | Switzerland U17 | 11 | (9) |
| 2010–2011 | Switzerland U19 | 12 | (8) |
| 2011–2012 | Switzerland U21 | 11 | (3) |
| 2013–2023 | Switzerland | 93 | (25) |
Medal record
Men's football
Representing Switzerland
FIFA U-17 World Cup
| Winner | 2009 Nigeria | U-17 Team |
- * Club domestic league appearances and goals as of 10:44, 23 January 2026 (UTC)

Haris Seferovic (Bosnian: Haris Seferović, pronounced [xǎːris sefěːroʋitɕ]; born 22 February 1992) is a Swiss professional footballer who plays as a striker for UAE Pro League club United.

Seferovic made his professional debut at Grasshopper in April 2009. Shortly afterwards, in January 2010, he was signed by Italian club Fiorentina. Much of his time at the latter club was spent out on loan, with a successful spell at Novara in Serie B, followed by a transfer to Real Sociedad of Spain in 2013. A year later, he joined German club Eintracht Frankfurt, with whom he spent three seasons before a transfer to Benfica in Portugal. He made over 180 appearances and scored over 70 goals for the club, winning the Bola de Prata for top scorer as the team won the Primeira Liga in 2018–19.

A full international since 2013, Seferovic represented Switzerland at the FIFA World Cup in 2014, 2018 and 2022, and the UEFA European Championship in 2016 and 2020, earning over 90 caps.

== Club career ==
=== Early career ===
Seferovic began his career in 1999 on FC Sursee's youth team and after five years signed in the summer of 2004 for Luzern. After three years in their youth teams, he was scouted by Grasshopper, and on 26 April 2009, he made his debut in the Swiss Super League against Neuchâtel Xamax. In January 2010, he was named as the Youth Player of the Year in the canton Lucerne.

=== Fiorentina ===
On 29 January 2010, Italian Serie A club Fiorentina signed Seferovic from Grasshopper for a €2.1 million transfer fee. One day later, La Viola announced the deal was completed. The youngster was assigned to Fiorentina's primavera team. On 4 August 2011, Seferovic was loaned to Swiss Super League club Neuchâtel Xamax.

On 27 January 2012, Seferovic was loaned to Serie A club Lecce during the January transfer window. He spent the second half of the 2012–13 season with Novara of Serie B, scoring 10 goals in 18 matches, all as a starter. He scored a hat-trick in a 3–1 win over Livorno on 17 April as Novara eventually finished in the play-offs.

=== Real Sociedad ===
On 11 July 2013, Seferovic completed a move to Spanish La Liga club Real Sociedad on a four-year contract for a €2 million transfer fee. He made his La Liga debut on 16 August 2013, and scored with a chip against Getafe, securing a 2–0 home victory. Four days later, he scored a volley as Real Sociedad beat Lyon 2–0 away from home in the play-off qualification round for the 2013–14 UEFA Champions League. He played in 24 league matches in his first season, only nine as a starter, and scored his only other league goal as a substitute for Carlos Vela, wrapping up a 5–0 win over Osasuna on 2 November. On 18 December, he scored Sociedad's third goal as the club defeated third-tier Algeciras 4–0 in the Copa del Rey's round of 32.

Seferovic was signed to partner Vela and Antoine Griezmann in Real Sociedad's attacking line. He had a difficult relationship with the fans, for posing with a whisky bottle after a draw with FC Barcelona in September, and for celebrating a goal by telling his team's fans to be quiet in November 2013. He spent the night of his 22nd birthday in February 2014 in a police cell after a late-night argument with his girlfriend, with both being released without charges. He arrived with comparisons to Darko Kovačević, a league runner-up with Real Sociedad in 2003, but did not capitalise on his early goals to cement a spot in the team.

=== Eintracht Frankfurt ===
On 1 August 2014, Seferovic completed a move to German Bundesliga club Eintracht Frankfurt, signing a three-year contract. The club said, "We intentionally chose a young player who already has a relatively high degree of experience, but who still has plenty of room for improvement." He made his debut on 16 August, scoring the opening goal in the ninth minute as Frankfurt defeated fourth-tier Viktoria Berlin 2–0 away in the first round of the DFB-Pokal. One week later, he made his first Bundesliga debut and scored the only goal from Frankfurt's first attack of the game to defeat SC Freiburg at the Waldstadion. In Frankfurt's 4–5 home defeat to VfB Stuttgart on 25 October, Seferovic was sent off for a second yellow card.

In the 2015–16 Bundesliga, Seferovic scored only three times in 29 games as Frankfurt came 16th and were confined to a play-off against 1. FC Nürnberg to maintain their spot in the top flight. After a 1–1 draw in the first leg at home, he scored the only goal in the second to maintain his club's place.

Seferovic received a three-match ban in February 2017 for striking Hertha BSC's Niklas Stark during a 2–0 loss in Berlin. It was Frankfurt's sixth dismissal of the season and he was also fined an undisclosed amount which was donated to charity. He played four matches in the team's runner-up DFB-Pokal campaign, and scored the winning goal at Hannover 96 in the round of 16.

=== Benfica ===
On 2 June 2017, Seferovic signed a five-year contract with Portuguese champions Benfica. He debuted on 5 August in the 2017 Supertaça Cândido de Oliveira, starting alongside Jonas and scoring the second goal in a 3–1 win over Vitória de Guimarães. Four days later, he made his Primeira Liga debut in a 3–1 home win over Braga. In October that year, he was praised by former Benfica footballer Nuno Gomes as a valuable player for the team. In his first season with Benfica, Seferovic scored six times across all competitions, with every goal being scored in the first half of the season, after which he lost his role of supporting Jonas to Raúl Jiménez.

Despite starting the 2018–19 season as the fourth attacking option of manager Rui Vitória, Seferovic became the team's top scorer on 11 January 2019, under the guidance of Bruno Lage. Most notably, in the league season, Seferovic scored the winning goal in a 1–0 home victory over Porto, netted the winner against Vitória de Guimarães away (0–1), scored the first goal in a 4–2 away win over Sporting CP, and netted a brace in a 10–0 thrashing of Nacional. Internationally, he scored yet another winner, this time in a 2–1 win over Galatasaray in the UEFA Europa League round of 32 on 14 February, helping Benfica seal their first victory in Turkey. With this goal, his 17th overall that season, he temporarily became the top scorer across all leagues in the world in 2019, with a 10-goal tally. His 23 league goals earned him the Bola de Prata, making him the second Swiss player (after Alexander Frei) to be the top goalscorer in a foreign league.

After his title-winning season, Seferovic signed a new contract lasting until 2024, and increasing his release clause to €60 million. In 2019–20, his starts and goals decreased due to the dominance of the Brazilian Carlos Vinícius. The following year, with the Brazilian loaned to Tottenham Hotspur, Seferovic returned to the forefront and scored 22 goals, one fewer than top scorer Pedro Gonçalves of Sporting.

In 2021–22, Seferovic was limited by persistent muscular injuries throughout the season, including an absence of 13 games between January and March.

==== Loan to Galatasaray ====
On 19 June 2022, Seferovic joined Galatasaray on a season-long loan for €1 million, with an option to make the move permanent for €2.5 million. He made his debut as a starter on 7 August as the Süper Lig season began with a 1–0 win at Antalyaspor. He scored his first goal on 19 October in a Turkish Cup third round 7–0 win over Kastamonuspor 1966, and added another in the next round on 8 November as the Istanbul side came from behind to beat Ofspor 2–1.

==== Loan to Celta ====
On 31 January 2023, Seferovic was loaned to La Liga side RC Celta de Vigo until the end of the season.

=== Al Wasl ===
On 5 July 2023, Seferovic signed with Al Wasl.

== International career ==
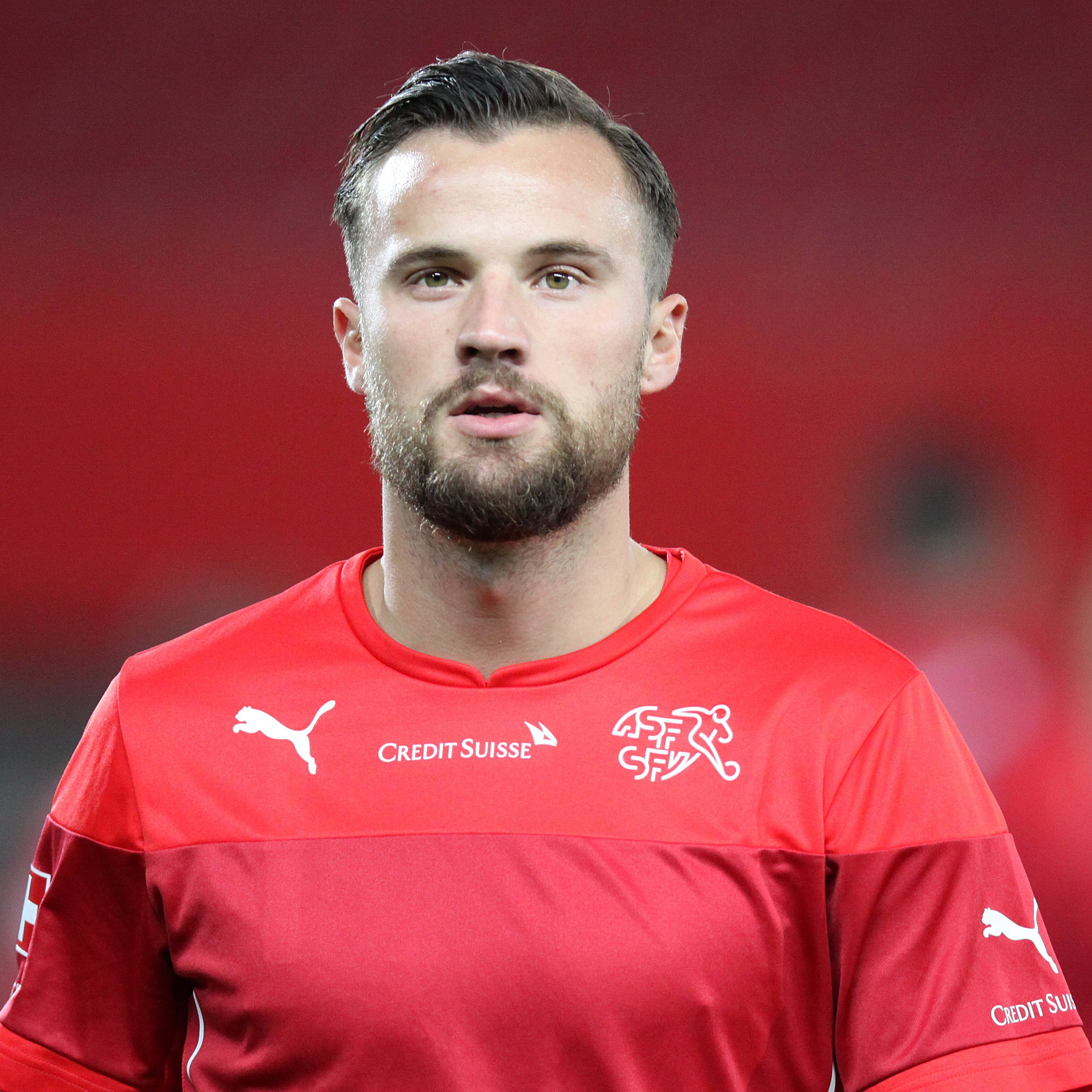
Seferovic with Switzerland in 2015

With the Swiss under-17 national team, Seferovic won the 2009 FIFA U-17 World Cup in Nigeria and was the top scorer of the tournament. He scored five goals at the tournament, including the winning goal in the final against hosts Nigeria.

In 2013, ahead of the Bosnia and Herzegovina national team's match against Slovenia, Seferovic claimed he wanted to play for the country of his parents' birth. However, he later accepted a call-up from Switzerland, and made his debut in a friendly against Greece on 6 February 2013, where he replaced Mario Gavranović for the last 20 minutes of the 0–0 away draw. On his third cap, on 8 June 2013, he replaced Josip Drmić for the last 15 minutes, and in injury time, scored the only goal of a home 2014 FIFA World Cup qualifier against Cyprus.

On 2 June 2014, Seferovic was named in Switzerland's 2014 World Cup squad by head coach Ottmar Hitzfeld. In the team's first match, on 15 June in Brasília against Ecuador, he replaced Drmić for the last 15 minutes and scored the winner in the third minute of stoppage time.

In qualification for UEFA Euro 2016, Seferovic scored three goals, including two in the first half of a 4–0 win away to San Marino that was Swiss' first victory of the campaign. Manager Vladimir Petković chose him in the 23-man squad for the finals in France.

Seferovic added four more goals as the Swiss qualified for the 2018 FIFA World Cup, with two in a 3–0 win over Andorra in St. Gallen on 31 August 2017. Petković named him for the squad to compete in the finals in Russia.

On 18 November 2018, Seferovic scored a hat-trick as the Swiss came from 0–2 down to defeat Belgium 5–2 in the UEFA Nations League to top their group and qualify for the finals. In May 2019, he played in 2019 UEFA Nations League Finals, where his team finished 4th.

On 31 May 2021, Seferovic was called up to play in the Euro 2020. On 28 June 2021, he played in the last 16 game against France and scored two headers, as the team drew 3–3 and won on penalties. The following 12 June, he headed the only goal in 57 seconds as the team beat leaders Portugal in the Nations League. He made three brief substitute appearances at the 2022 FIFA World Cup in Qatar, where the Swiss were eliminated by the Portuguese in the last 16.

== Personal life ==
Seferovic's family is from Sanski Most, Bosnia and Herzegovina (then in SFR Yugoslavia); his parents Hamza and Šefika Seferović immigrated to Switzerland in the late 1980s. He is of Bosniak origin. In 2009, he described himself as a Muslim but said that he did not practice all rules of the religion: "I have already eaten pork. But I am a believer, and that gives me strength". He fasts for Ramadan, but only outside of the football season.

== Career statistics ==
=== Club ===
As of match played 24 October 2025

Appearances and goals by club, season and competition
| Club | Season | League | | | National cup (Note: Includes Coppa Italia, Copa del Rey, DFB-Pokal, Taça de Portugal, Turkish Cup, UAE President's Cup) | | League cup (Note: Includes Taça da Liga, UAE League Cup) | | Continental | | Other | | Total | |
| Club | Season | Division | Apps | Goals | Apps | Goals | Apps | Goals | Apps | Goals | Apps | Goals | Apps | Goals |
|---|---|---|---|---|---|---|---|---|---|---|---|---|---|---|
| Grasshopper | 2008–09 | Swiss Challenge League | 1 | 0 | 0 | 0 | — | | 0 | 0 | — | | 1 | 0 |
| Grasshopper | 2009–10 | Swiss Challenge League | 2 | 0 | 0 | 0 | — | | — | | — | | 2 | 0 |
| Grasshopper | Total | | 3 | 0 | 0 | 0 | — | | 0 | 0 | — | | 3 | 0 |
| Fiorentina | 2010–11 | Serie A | 1 | 0 | 2 | 0 | — | | — | | — | | 3 | 0 |
| Fiorentina | 2012–13 | Serie A | 7 | 0 | 2 | 1 | — | | — | | — | | 9 | 1 |
| Fiorentina | Total | | 8 | 0 | 4 | 1 | — | | — | | — | | 12 | 1 |
| Neuchâtel Xamax (loan) | 2011–12 | Swiss Super League | 14 | 2 | 0 | 0 | — | | — | | 0 | 0 | 14 | 2 |
| Lecce (loan) | 2011–12 | Serie A | 5 | 0 | 0 | 0 | — | | — | | — | | 5 | 0 |
| Novara (loan) | 2012–13 | Serie B | 18 | 10 | 0 | 0 | — | | — | | — | | 18 | 10 |
| Real Sociedad | 2013–14 | La Liga | 24 | 2 | 8 | 1 | — | | 8 (Note: Appearances in UEFA Champions League) | 1 | — | | 40 | 4 |
| Eintracht Frankfurt | 2014–15 | Bundesliga | 32 | 10 | 2 | 1 | — | | — | | — | | 34 | 11 |
| Eintracht Frankfurt | 2015–16 | Bundesliga | 29 | 3 | 2 | 0 | — | | — | | 2 (Note: Appearances in Bundesliga relegation play-offs) | 1 | 33 | 4 |
| Eintracht Frankfurt | 2016–17 | Bundesliga | 25 | 3 | 4 | 1 | — | | — | | — | | 29 | 4 |
| Eintracht Frankfurt | Total | | 86 | 16 | 8 | 2 | — | | — | | 2 | 1 | 96 | 19 |
| Benfica | 2017–18 | Primeira Liga | 20 | 4 | 2 | 0 | 2 | 1 | 4 | 1 | 1 (Note: Appearance in Supertaça Cândido de Oliveira) | 1 | 29 | 7 |
| Benfica | 2018–19 | Primeira Liga | 29 | 23 | 5 | 0 | 4 | 2 | 13 (Note: Eight appearances and one goal in UEFA Champions League, five appearances and one goal in UEFA Europa League) | 2 | — | | 51 | 27 |
| Benfica | 2019–20 | Primeira Liga | 30 | 5 | 5 | 2 | 2 | 0 | 7 (Note: Five appearances and two goals in UEFA Champions League, two appearances in UEFA Europa League) | 2 | 1 | 0 | 45 | 9 |
| Benfica | 2020–21 | Primeira Liga | 31 | 22 | 6 | 4 | 2 | 0 | 8 (Note: One appearance in UEFA Champions League, seven appearances in UEFA Europa League) | 0 | 1 | 0 | 48 | 26 |
| Benfica | 2021–22 | Primeira Liga | 10 | 3 | 2 | 1 | 1 | 1 | 2 | 0 | — | | 15 | 5 |
| Benfica | Total | | 120 | 57 | 20 | 7 | 11 | 4 | 34 | 5 | 3 | 1 | 188 | 74 |
| Galatasaray (loan) | 2022–23 | Süper Lig | 10 | 0 | 3 | 2 | — | | — | | — | | 13 | 2 |
| Celta Vigo (loan) | 2022–23 | La Liga | 18 | 3 | — | | — | | — | | — | | 18 | 3 |
| Al Wasl | 2023–24 | UAE Pro League | 25 | 11 | 3 | 3 | 6 | 2 | — | | — | | 34 | 16 |
| Al Wasl | 2024–25 | UAE Pro League | 11 | 2 | 2 | 0 | 1 | 0 | 6 (Note: Appearances in AFC Champions League Elite) | 0 | 2 (Note: One appearance in UAE Super Cup, one appearance in Qatar-UAE Super Cup) | 0 | 22 | 2 |
| Al Wasl | Total | | 36 | 13 | 5 | 3 | 7 | 2 | 6 | 0 | 2 | 0 | 56 | 18 |
| Al Nasr | 2024–25 | UAE Pro League | 12 | 2 | — | | — | | — | | 1 (Note: Appearance in AGCFF Gulf Club Champions League) | 2 | 13 | 4 |
| Dubai United | 2025–26 | UAE First Division League | 1 | 1 | 3 | 0 | — | | — | | — | | 4 | 1 |
| Career total | | | 357 | 104 | 51 | 16 | 18 | 6 | 48 | 6 | 8 | 4 | 480 | 140 |

=== International ===
Appearances and goals by national team and year
| National team | Year | Apps | Goals |
|---|---|---|---|
| Switzerland | 2013 | 9 | 1 |
| Switzerland | 2014 | 11 | 3 |
| Switzerland | 2015 | 7 | 3 |
| Switzerland | 2016 | 11 | 1 |
| Switzerland | 2017 | 9 | 3 |
| Switzerland | 2018 | 12 | 6 |
| Switzerland | 2019 | 5 | 1 |
| Switzerland | 2020 | 6 | 1 |
| Switzerland | 2021 | 12 | 5 |
| Switzerland | 2022 | 10 | 1 |
| Switzerland | 2023 | 1 | 0 |
| Total | | 93 | 25 |

As of match played 12 June 2022
Scores and results list Switzerland's goal tally first, score column indicates score after each Seferovic goal.

List of international goals scored by Haris Seferovic
| No. | Date | Venue | Opponent | Score | Result | Competition |
|---|---|---|---|---|---|---|
| 1 | 8 June 2013 | Stade de Genève, Geneva, Switzerland | Cyprus | 1–0 | 1–0 | 2014 FIFA World Cup qualification |
| 2 | 15 June 2014 | Estádio Nacional Mané Garrincha, Brasília, Brazil | Ecuador | 2–1 | 2–1 | 2014 FIFA World Cup |
| 3 | 14 October 2014 | San Marino Stadium, Serravalle, San Marino | San Marino | 1–0 | 4–0 | UEFA Euro 2016 qualifying |
| 4 | 14 October 2014 | San Marino Stadium, Serravalle, San Marino | San Marino | 2–0 | 4–0 | UEFA Euro 2016 qualifying |
| 5 | 27 March 2015 | Swissporarena, Lucerne, Switzerland | Estonia | 3–0 | 3–0 | UEFA Euro 2016 qualifying |
| 6 | 17 November 2015 | Ernst-Happel-Stadion, Vienna, Austria | Austria | 1–0 | 2–1 | Friendly |
| 7 | 17 November 2015 | Ernst-Happel-Stadion, Vienna, Austria | Austria | 2–1 | 2–1 | Friendly |
| 8 | 7 October 2016 | Ferencváros Stadion, Budapest, Hungary | Hungary | 1–0 | 3–2 | 2018 FIFA World Cup qualification |
| 9 | 31 August 2017 | Kybunpark, St. Gallen, Switzerland | Andorra | 1–0 | 3–0 | 2018 FIFA World Cup qualification |
| 10 | 31 August 2017 | Kybunpark, St. Gallen, Switzerland | Andorra | 2–0 | 3–0 | 2018 FIFA World Cup qualification |
| 11 | 3 September 2017 | Skonto Stadium, Riga, Latvia | Latvia | 1–0 | 3–0 | 2018 FIFA World Cup qualification |
| 12 | 8 June 2018 | Cornaredo Stadium, Lugano, Switzerland | Japan | 2–0 | 2–0 | Friendly |
| 13 | 8 September 2018 | Kybunpark, St. Gallen, Switzerland | Iceland | 4–0 | 6–0 | 2018–19 UEFA Nations League A |
| 14 | 15 October 2018 | Laugardalsvöllur, Reykjavík, Iceland | Iceland | 1–0 | 2–1 | 2018–19 UEFA Nations League A |
| 15 | 18 November 2018 | Swissporarena, Lucerne, Switzerland | Belgium | 2–2 | 5–2 | 2018–19 UEFA Nations League A |
| 16 | 18 November 2018 | Swissporarena, Lucerne, Switzerland | Belgium | 3–2 | 5–2 | 2018–19 UEFA Nations League A |
| 17 | 18 November 2018 | Swissporarena, Lucerne, Switzerland | Belgium | 5–2 | 5–2 | 2018–19 UEFA Nations League A |
| 18 | 15 October 2019 | Stade de Genève, Geneva, Switzerland | Republic of Ireland | 1–0 | 2–0 | UEFA Euro 2020 qualifying |
| 19 | 3 September 2020 | Arena Lviv, Lviv, Ukraine | Ukraine | 1–1 | 1–2 | 2020–21 UEFA Nations League A |
| 20 | 25 March 2021 | Vasil Levski National Stadium, Sofia, Bulgaria | Bulgaria | 2–0 | 3–1 | 2022 FIFA World Cup qualification |
| 21 | 31 March 2021 | Kybunpark, St. Gallen, Switzerland | Finland | 3–2 | 3–2 | Friendly |
| 22 | 20 June 2021 | Baku Olympic Stadium, Baku, Azerbaijan | Turkey | 1–0 | 3–1 | UEFA Euro 2020 |
| 23 | 28 June 2021 | Arena Națională, Bucharest, Romania | France | 1–0 | 3–3 (a.e.t.) | UEFA Euro 2020 |
| 24 | 28 June 2021 | Arena Națională, Bucharest, Romania | France | 2–3 | 3–3 (a.e.t.) | UEFA Euro 2020 |
| 25 | 12 June 2022 | Stade de Genève, Geneva, Switzerland | Portugal | 1–0 | 1–0 | 2022–23 UEFA Nations League A |

== Honours ==
Benfica

- Primeira Liga: 2018–19
- Supertaça Cândido de Oliveira: 2017, 2019

Galatasaray

- Süper Lig: 2022–23

Al Wasl

- UAE Pro League: 2023–24
- UAE President's Cup: 2023–24
- Qatar–UAE Super Cup: 2024–25

Switzerland U17

- FIFA U-17 World Cup: 2009

Individual

- Primeira Liga Bola de Prata: 2018–19
- Bosnian U19 Football Player of the Year: 2009
- Swiss Player of the Year: 2019
- Primeira Liga Team of the Year: 2018–19, 2020–21
- Primeira Liga Player of the Month: March 2021
- Primeira Liga Forward of the Month: February 2019, March 2021
