= Timothy Chandler =

Soccer player (born 1990)

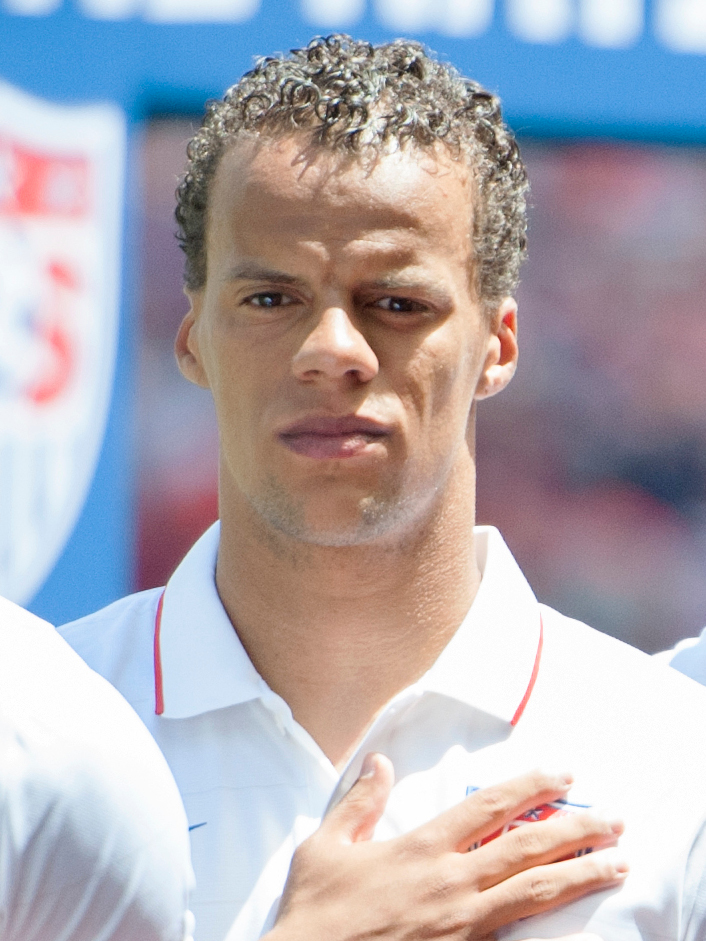
- Chandler with the United States in 2014

Personal information
- Full name: Timothy Chandler
- Date of birth: March 29, 1990 (age 36)
- Place of birth: Frankfurt am Main, West Germany
- Height: 1.87 m (6 ft 2 in)
- Position: Right-back

Team information
- Current team: Eintracht Frankfurt
- Number: 22

Youth career
- Sportfreunde Oberau
- 2001–2008: Eintracht Frankfurt

Senior career*
Years	Team	Apps	(Gls)
2008–2010	Eintracht Frankfurt II	50	(8)
2010	1. FC Nürnberg II	17	(4)
2011–2014	1. FC Nürnberg	95	(4)
2014–	Eintracht Frankfurt	170	(9)

International career
2011–2016	United States	29	(1)
- * Club domestic league appearances and goals as of September 16, 2026

Timothy Chandler (born March 29, 1990) is a professional footballer who plays as a right-back for Bundesliga club Eintracht Frankfurt. Born in Germany, he represented the United States national team.

== Early life and education ==
Chandler was born in Frankfurt, West Germany, to an African American father, who served in the U.S. military, and a German mother. His father and mother separated shortly after his birth. He continued to live with his mother in Germany.

== Club career ==
=== 1. FC Nürnberg ===
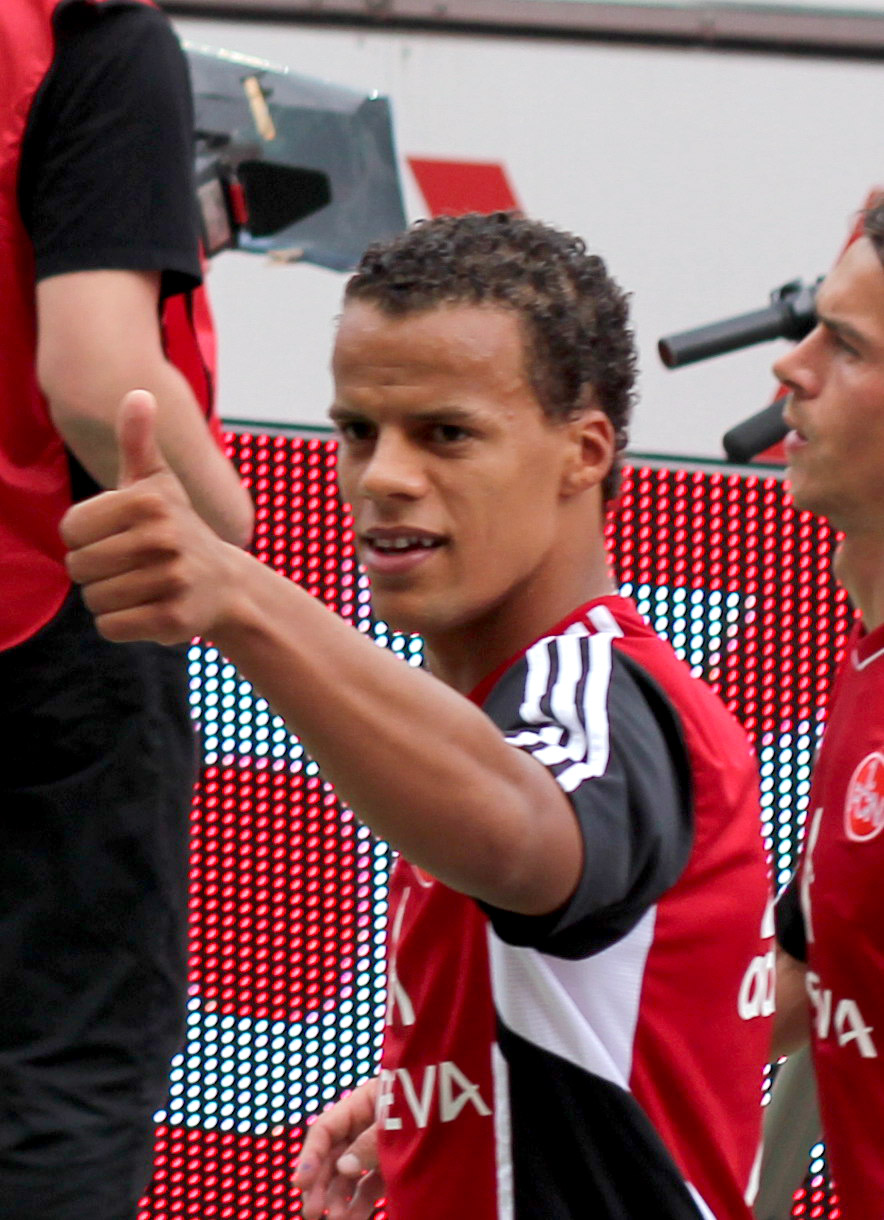
Chandler with Nürnberg in 2011

Chandler began his career at Sportfreunde Oberau as well as time with Eintracht Frankfurt before transferring to 1. FC Nürnberg in the summer of 2010. He made his debut for the first team of 1. FC Nürnberg on January 15, 2011, against Borussia Mönchengladbach. On February 12, 2011, he scored the first goal of his professional career against VfB Stuttgart.

Chandler made his first appearance of the 2011–12 season on July 30, 2011, providing an assist for Markus Feulner's equalizing goal in an eventual 5–1 triumph over Arminia Bielefeld in the first round of the DFB-Pokal. Chandler's debut appearance of the year's Bundesliga campaign came a week later on August 6, playing the full ninety minutes of a narrow 1–0 defeat of Hertha BSC. Chandler netted his only goal of the campaign on November 26 against FC Kaiserslautern, blasting the ball in from the edge of the area, securing a 1–0 win and the club's first victory in eight games. Two weeks later on December 10, the referee adjudged Chandler's challenge on Sejad Salihović as too strong and the American was given a red card; down to ten man, Nürnberg fell to a 2–0 loss with both goals coming from Vedad Ibišević. Things turned worse for Chandler and Nürnberg two days later, as the defender was at fault for conceding the only goal of the game against SpVgg Greuther Fürth in the third round of the DFB-Pokal, eliminating his side from the competition.

In Nürnberg's 4–1 win over Schalke on April 11, 2012, Chandler provided his second assist of the season, finding midfielder Daniel Didavi who made it 3–0. Chandler made his 30th, 29 of which were starts, and final appearance of the Bundesliga season on April 28 in Nürnberg's 3–2 defeat of Hoffenheim, taking revenge for his red card and the club's loss earlier in the season. Nürnberg finished the season in a respectable tenth place in the Bundesliga and Chandler attracted interest from many clubs, including VfB Stuttgart. However, Chandler decided to reject the overtures from other German clubs and signed a contract extension with Nürnberg, tying him to the club until July 2015.

Chandler's first appearance in the 2012–13 season came in Nürnberg's humbling 3–2 defeat to fifth division side TSV Havelse in the first round of the DFB-Pokal on August 19, 2012. His only goal of the campaign came against Hannover 96 on September 26, scoring a consolation goal as his side fell to a 4–1 defeat. Chandler again made 30 Bundesliga appearances, 29 from the start, as Nürnberg finished the league in tenth position on 44 points.

=== Eintracht Frankfurt ===
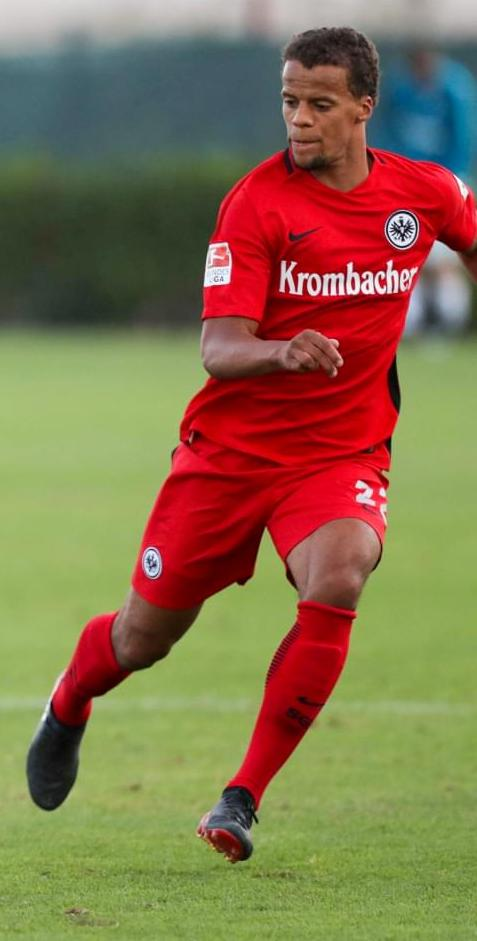
Chandler playing for Eintracht Frankfurt in 2017

After Nürnberg were relegated at the end of the 2013–14 Bundesliga season, Chandler signed a three-year contract with his former club Eintracht Frankfurt on June 3, 2014.

== International career ==
In March 2011, Chandler was selected by Bob Bradley as part of the United States's 24-man squad set to face Paraguay and Argentina in international friendlies. Chandler made his debut with the U.S. on March 26, 2011, playing the entire second half of a 1–1 draw against Argentina. On May 16, 2012, Timothy Chandler declined an offer from U.S. coach Jürgen Klinsmann to join his training camp for the upcoming friendlies and 2014 World Cup Qualifiers. Klinsmann stated that Timothy expressed a need to take a break from the U.S. and find his international identity. However, Chandler later accepted a call-up for the U.S. friendly against Russia, stating that he was "in 1,000 percent." On February 4, 2013, Jürgen Klinsmann named Chandler to the United States' 24-man roster for February 6, 2013 match at Honduras; his start against Honduras on February 6, 2013 "cap-tied" Chandler to the United States for all future international competitions, under FIFA rules.

Chandler did not feature for the United States until 15 months later when he was recalled by Klinsmann as part of the 30-man squad in preparation for the 2014 FIFA World Cup. He was then selected to the final 23-man roster on May 22, 2014, for the finals in Brazil. Though he was on the final roster that went to Brazil, Chandler did not see any game action.

Chandler was again called up for the 2015 CONCACAF Gold Cup and started at right back in the opening game against Honduras.

== Career statistics ==
=== Club ===
As of match played September 12, 2026

Club	Season	League			National cup		Continental		Other		Total	
Club	Season	Division	Apps	Goals	Apps	Goals	Apps	Goals	Apps	Goals	Apps	Goals
Eintracht Frankfurt II	2007–08	Hessenliga	3	0	—		—		—		3	0
Eintracht Frankfurt II	2008–09	Regionalliga Süd	19	2	—		—		—		19	2
Eintracht Frankfurt II	2009–10	Regionalliga Süd	28	6	—		—		—		28	6
Eintracht Frankfurt II	Total		50	8	—		—		—		50	8
1. FC Nürnberg II	2010–11	Regionalliga Süd	17	4	—		—		—		17	4
1. FC Nürnberg	2010–11	Bundesliga	14	1	2	0	—		—		16	1
1. FC Nürnberg	2011–12	Bundesliga	30	1	3	0	—		—		33	1
1. FC Nürnberg	2012–13	Bundesliga	30	1	1	0	—		—		31	1
1. FC Nürnberg	2013–14	Bundesliga	21	1	1	0	—		—		22	1
1. FC Nürnberg	Total		95	4	7	0	—		—		102	4
Eintracht Frankfurt	2014–15	Bundesliga	29	1	0	0	—		—		29	1
Eintracht Frankfurt	2015–16	Bundesliga	12	0	0	0	—		2 (Note: Appearances in Bundesliga relegation play-offs)	0	14	0
Eintracht Frankfurt	2016–17	Bundesliga	32	0	6	0	—		—		38	0
Eintracht Frankfurt	2017–18	Bundesliga	24	2	1	1	—		—		25	3
Eintracht Frankfurt	2018–19	Bundesliga	1	0	0	0	0	0	0	0	1	0
Eintracht Frankfurt	2019–20	Bundesliga	22	5	4	0	7 (Note: Appearance(s) in UEFA Europa League)	0	—		33	5
Eintracht Frankfurt	2020–21	Bundesliga	15	1	2	0	—		—		17	1
Eintracht Frankfurt	2021–22	Bundesliga	17	0	0	0	5	0	—		22	0
Eintracht Frankfurt	2022–23	Bundesliga	6	0	1	0	1 (Note: Appearance in UEFA Champions League)	0	—		8	0
Eintracht Frankfurt	2023–24	Bundesliga	6	0	0	0	2 (Note: Appearances in UEFA Europa Conference League)	0	—		8	0
Eintracht Frankfurt	2024–25	Bundesliga	3	0	0	0	0	0	—		3	0
Eintracht Frankfurt	2025–26	Bundesliga	1	0	—		—		—		1	0
Eintracht Frankfurt	2026–27	Bundesliga	2	0	0	0	0	0	—		2	0
Total			170	9	14	1	15	0	2	0	201	10
Career total			332	25	21	1	15	0	2	0	370	26

=== International ===
Scores and results list the United States's goal tally first.

No.	Date	Venue	Opponent	Score	Result	Competition	Ref.
1.	July 3, 2015	Nissan Stadium, Nashville, United States	Guatemala	2–0	4–0	Friendly	

== Honors ==
Eintracht Frankfurt

- DFB-Pokal: 2017–18
- UEFA Europa League: 2021–22
