= Roussel Ngankam =

Footballer (born 1993)

Personal information
- Full name: Roussel-Fidele Ngankam-Hontcheu
- Date of birth: 15 September 1993 (age 33)
- Place of birth: Bafang, Cameroon
- Height: 1.80 m (5 ft 11 in)
- Position: Forward

Youth career
- 2005–2012: Hertha BSC

Senior career*
Years	Team	Apps	(Gls)
2011–2012	Hertha BSC II	4	(3)
2012–2014	1. FC Nürnberg II	45	(6)
2014–2015	Botoșani	25	(2)
2015–2016	Sonnenhof Großaspach	22	(0)
2016–2018	Rot-Weiss Essen	30	(7)
2019	VfB Eichstätt	6	(0)
2019–2020	DJK TuS Hordel		
2020–2021	SG Wattenscheid 09	6	(0)
2022	FSV Duisburg	0	(0)
2024	Firtinaspor Herne	1	(0)

International career
2008	Germany U16	2	(0)
2009–2010	Germany U17	7	(4)
2010–2011	Germany U18	3	(2)
2012	Germany U19	1	(0)
- * Club domestic league appearances and goals as of 22:15, 8 July 2021 (UTC)

Roussel-Fidele Ngankam-Hontcheu (born 15 September 1993) is a footballer who plays as a forward. Born in Cameroon, Ngankam represented Germany internationally at youth levels.

== Personal life ==
Ngankam's brother Jessic is also a footballer, and appeared for the Germany youth national teams.
