= Markus Feulner =

German footballer

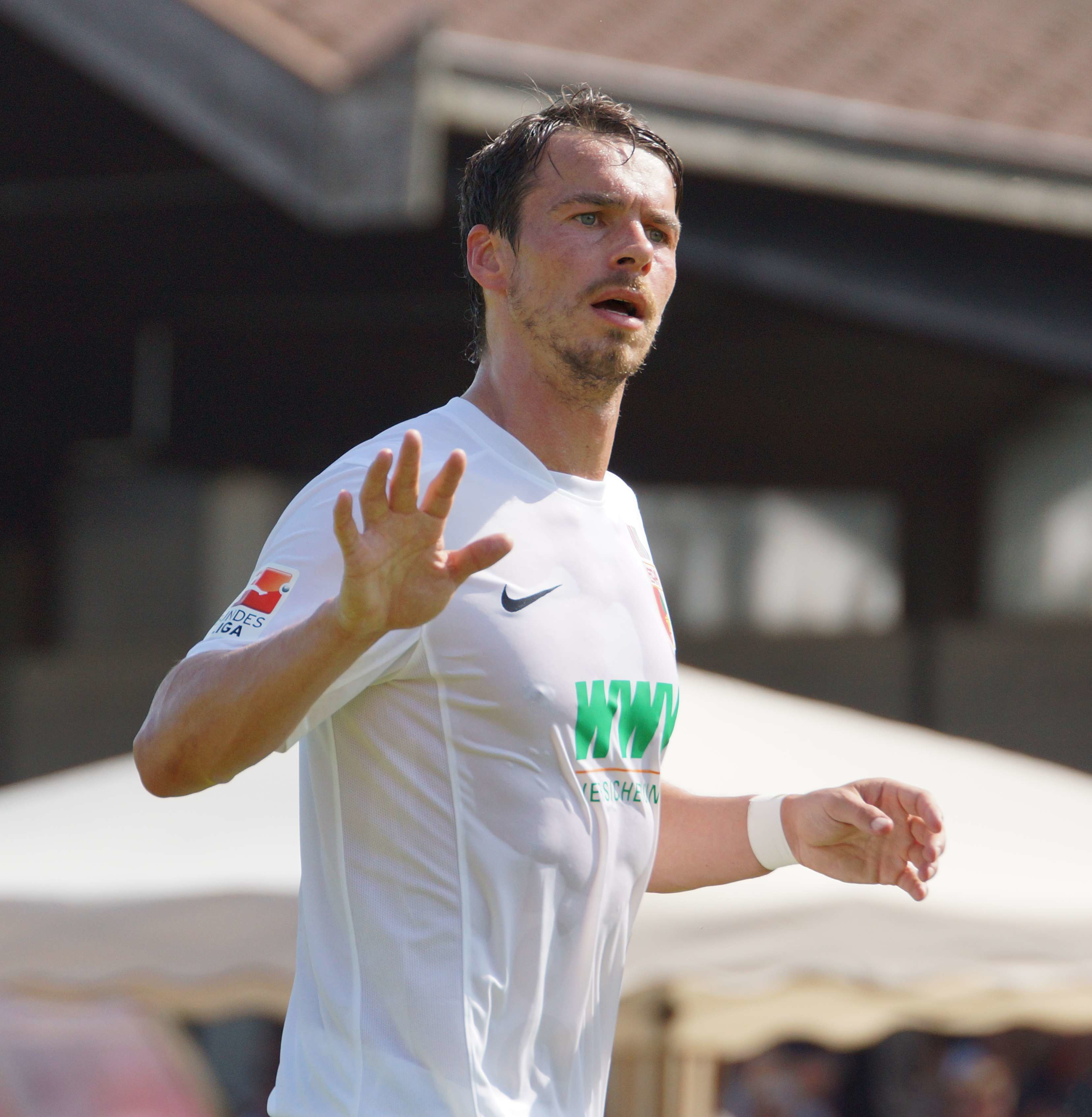
- Feulner with FC Augsburg in 2015

Personal information
- Date of birth: 12 February 1982 (age 44)
- Place of birth: Scheßlitz, West Germany
- Height: 1.81 m (5 ft 11 in)
- Position: Midfielder

Team information
- Current team: FC Augsburg II (head coach)

Youth career
- 1988–1992: SV Pettstadt
- 1992–1997: 1. FC Bamberg
- 1997–2000: Bayern Munich

Senior career*
Years	Team	Apps	(Gls)
2000–2003	Bayern Munich II	53	(9)
2001–2003	Bayern Munich	13	(0)
2004–2006	1. FC Köln II	12	(1)
2004–2006	1. FC Köln	38	(4)
2006–2009	FSV Mainz 05	87	(15)
2009–2011	Borussia Dortmund	15	(0)
2011–2014	1. FC Nürnberg	76	(7)
2014–2017	FC Augsburg	45	(2)
2017–2019	FC Augsburg II	48	(4)
Total		387	(42)

International career
2002–2004	Germany U21	13	(1)

Managerial career
- 2019–2022: FC Augsburg (U15 & U19 staff)
- 2022–2023: FC Augsburg (U16 manager)
- 2023–2024: FC Augsburg (U17 manager)
- 2024–2025: FC Augsburg (U19 manager)
- 2025–: FC Augsburg II (manager)
Medal record
Bayern Munich
Winner	Bundesliga	2003
Borussia Dortmund
Winner	Bundesliga	2011
- * Club domestic league appearances and goals

Markus Feulner ([ˈmaːkʊs ˈfɔʏlnɐ], born 12 February 1982) is a German former professional footballer who mainly played as a midfielder.

== Playing areer ==
=== Early career ===
Born in Scheßlitz, Upper Franconia, Feulner went through the Bayern Munich academy, but was unable to gain a place in the first team. In January 2004, he signed for strugglers 1. FC Köln. Hampered by injuries, Feulner could only play 38 games for the first team in two and a half seasons as the club moved in and out of the top flight.

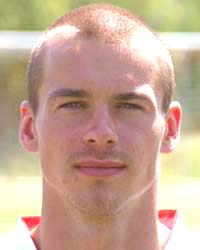
Feulner with Mainz in 2006

After a second relegation with Köln in 2006, Feulner signed for Mainz 05. Since then, even though Mainz was relegated the year after, he developed into an influential midfielder for the club and was rumored to have attracted interest from higher-profile teams such as Bayer Leverkusen.

On 18 March 2009, it was announced that Feulner had signed a three-year contract with Borussia Dortmund. He officially joined on 1 July 2009 on a free transfer where he met up with his former coach Jürgen Klopp.

=== 1. FC Nürnberg ===
In summer 2011, Feulner moved to 1. FC Nürnberg where he played 28 matches and scored one goal in his first season.

=== FC Augsburg ===
After three years with FC Augsburg in the Bundesliga, Feulner ended his top level career and signed a new two-year contract with the club's reserve team, playing in fourth tier Regionalliga Bayern. Additionally he became assistant coach of the club's under-16-team.

== Coaching career ==
At the end of the 2018–19 season, Feulner retired and was hired as a part of the technical staff of FC Augsburg's U15 squad. He later became part of the U-19 team staff before taking over as head coach of the club's U-16 team ahead of the 2022–23 season. In March 2023, he took over the U17s, and ahead of the 2024–25 season, he was appointed manager of the U19s.

== Career statistics ==
As of matches played on 26 May 2018

Appearances and goals by club, season and competition
Club	Season	League			Cup		Continental		Total		Ref.
Club	Season	League	Apps	Goals	Apps	Goals	Apps	Goals	Apps	Goals	Ref.
Bayern Munich II	2000–01	Regionalliga Süd	8	0	—		—		8	0	
Bayern Munich II	2001–02	Regionalliga Süd	21	4	—		—		21	4	
Bayern Munich II	2002–03	Regionalliga Süd	18	4	—		—		18	4	
Bayern Munich II	2003–04	Regionalliga Süd	6	1	—		—		6	1	
Bayern Munich II	Total		53	9	0	0	0	0	53	9	—
Bayern Munich	2001–02	Bundesliga	1	0	1	0	3	0	5	0	
Bayern Munich	2002–03	Bundesliga	10	0	1	0	1	1	12	1	
Bayern Munich	2003–04	Bundesliga	2	0	0	0	0	0	2	0	
Bayern Munich	Total		13	0	2	0	4	1	19	1	—
1. FC Köln	2003–04	Bundesliga	12	1	0	0	—		12	1	
1. FC Köln	2004–05	2. Bundesliga	13	1	2	1	—		15	1	
1. FC Köln	2005–06	Bundesliga	13	3	1	1	—		14	4	
1. FC Köln	Total		38	5	3	2	0	0	41	7	—
1. FC Köln II	2004–05	Regionalliga Nord	9	1	—		—		9	1	
1. FC Köln II	2005–06	Regionalliga Nord	3	0	—		—		3	0	
1. FC Köln II	Total		12	1	0	0	0	0	12	1	—
Mainz 05	2006–07	Bundesliga	30	2	1	0	—		31	2	
Mainz 05	2007–08	2. Bundesliga	27	6	1	1	—		28	7	
Mainz 05	2008–09	2. Bundesliga	30	7	5	1	—		35	8	
Mainz 05	Total		87	15	7	2	0	0	87	17	—
Borussia Dortmund II	2008–09	3. Liga	2	0	—		—		2	0	
Borussia Dortmund	2008–09	Bundesliga	9	0	2	0	0	0	11	0	
Borussia Dortmund	2009–10	Bundesliga	6	0	1	0	2	0	9	0	
Borussia Dortmund	Total		15	0	3	0	2	0	20	0	—
1. FC Nürnberg	2011–12	Bundesliga	28	1	2	3	—		30	4	
1. FC Nürnberg	2012–13	Bundesliga	23	4	0	0	—		23	4	
1. FC Nürnberg	2013–14	Bundesliga	25	2	1	0	—		26	2	
1. FC Nürnberg	Total		76	7	3	3	0	0	79	10	—
FC Augsburg	2014–15	Bundesliga	25	1	0	0	—		25	1	
FC Augsburg	2015–16	Bundesliga	19	1	2	0	5	0	26	1	
FC Augsburg	2016–17	Bundesliga	1	0	1	0	—		2	0	
FC Augsburg	Total		45	2	3	0	5	0	53	2	—
FC Augsburg II	2017–18	Regionalliga Bayern	25	2	—		—		25	2	
Career total			366	41	21	5	11	1	398	47	—

== Honors ==
Bayern Munich

- Bundesliga: 2002–03
- DFB-Pokal: 2002–03

Borussia Dortmund

- Bundesliga: 2010–11
