= Szabolcs Huszti =

Hungarian footballer (born 1983)

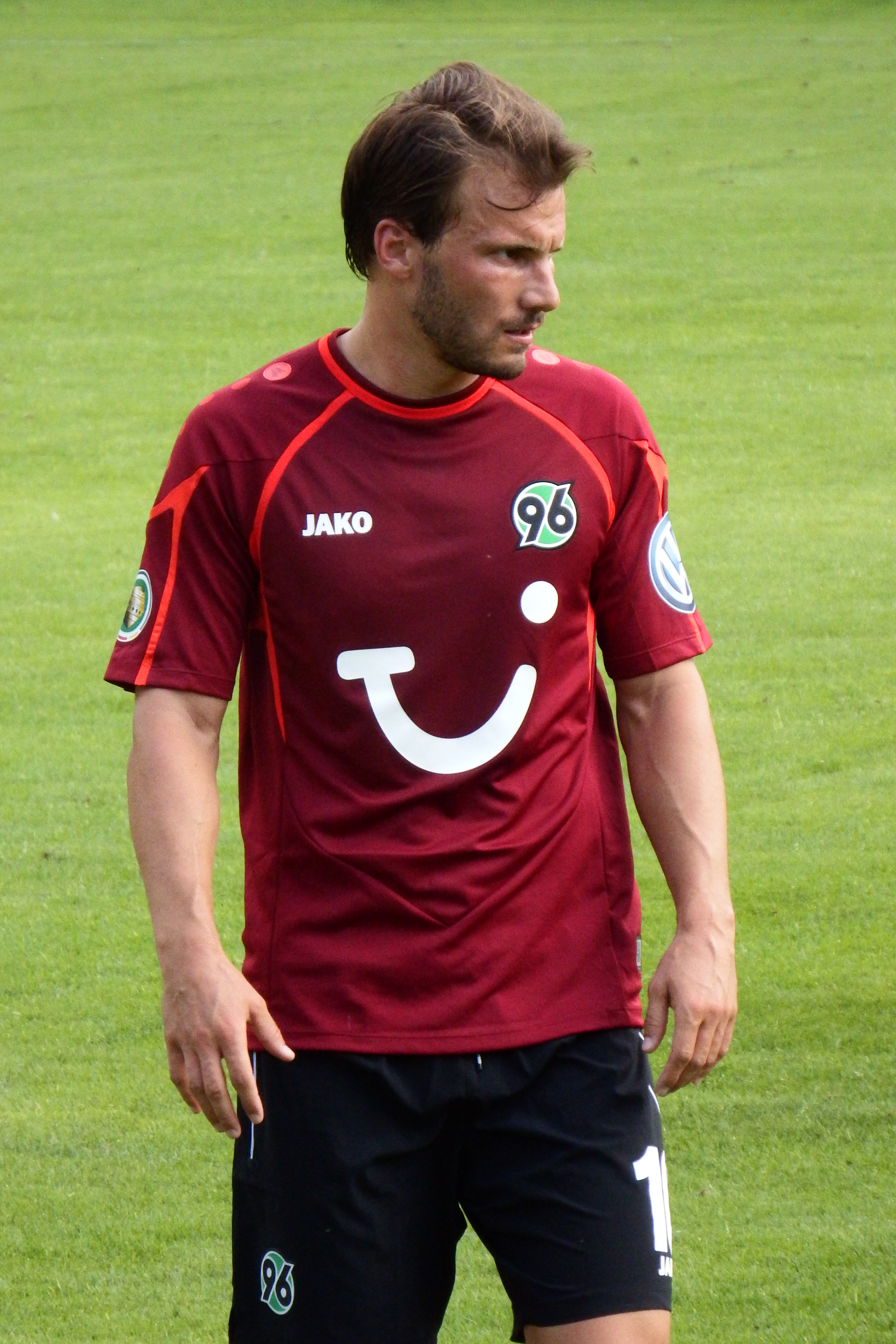
- Huszti with Hannover 96 in 2013

Personal information
- Date of birth: 18 April 1983 (age 43)
- Place of birth: Miskolc, Hungary
- Height: 1.73 m (5 ft 8 in)
- Position: Midfielder

Team information
- Current team: Fehérvár (manager)

Youth career
- –1997: Tapolca Bauxit
- 1997–2002: Ferencváros

Senior career*
Years	Team	Apps	(Gls)
2002–2005	Ferencváros	24	(3)
2003–2004	→ Sopron (loan)	14	(6)
2005–2006	Metz	18	(1)
2006–2009	Hannover 96	81	(17)
2009–2012	Zenit Saint Petersburg	58	(7)
2012–2014	Hannover 96	51	(19)
2014–2015	Changchun Yatai	39	(9)
2016–2017	Eintracht Frankfurt	30	(3)
2017	Changchun Yatai	16	(4)
2018–2020	Fehérvár	43	(7)
Total		374	(76)

International career
2004–2010	Hungary	51	(7)

Managerial career
- 2021: Debreceni VSC
- 2022: Fehérvár
- * Club domestic league appearances and goals

Szabolcs Huszti (Hungarian pronunciation: [ˈsɒbolt͡ʃ ˈhusti]; born 18 April 1983) is a Hungarian professional football coach and a former player. He is the de facto manager of Fehérvár, even though Gábor Toldi formally holds that position. He was well known for his dribbling, pace, passing and goal scoring ability from midfield.

Huszti began his professional career at the Hungarian club Ferencváros. A short stint with Metz followed, before he was signed by Bundesliga club Hannover 96 for £210,000 in 2006. He scored six goals in his first season, the most memorable coming in a shocking 1–0 victory away at Bayern Munich. In 2009, he moved to Zenit Saint Petersburg to replace Arsenal-bound Andrey Arshavin. After several spells in Germany and China, Huszti returned to Hungary where he retired as part of Fehérvár in 2020.

He was first called up for the Hungary national team during his time on loan at Sopron, and made his senior international debut in April 2004. Huszti was suspended from the team in 2007 after walking out of a training camp ahead of two UEFA Euro 2008 qualifiers. In 2008, he made his comeback for his country in a 1–1 draw against Slovakia. He retired from international football in 2010, as he wanted to focus on his club career and that he did not like the atmosphere around the national side.

== Club career ==
=== Ferencváros ===
Huszti (his surname meaning "from Huszt" now in Ukraine) began his professional career at the Hungarian club Ferencváros. Following a solitary first team appearance, he was loaned out to fellow top-flight team FC Sopron in December 2003. During this six-month stint, he scored goals in his 14 appearances. He was called back to his parent club for the 2004–05 season, and began brightly, scoring on his return against Győr and establishing himself as a regular starter.

Huszti's time in his native country wasn't to last beyond that one season. Despite interest from Rangers and West Bromwich Albion, he was eventually sold to FC Metz of France's Ligue 1 in summer 2005. His new club was to endure a difficult season though, as they ended up suffering relegation. This was the catalyst for another move, as he transferred to Bundesliga club Hannover 96 for just £210,000 in July 2006.

=== Hannover 96 ===
Huszti made his Bundesliga debut on 13 August 2006, against then-champions Werder Bremen. His versatility – being adept in both wide positions (despite his preferred left foot), amid the midfield or even as an advanced attacker – saw him become a permanent fixture in the team. He also managed six goals in his first season, the most memorable perhaps coming in a shock 1–0 victory at Bayern Munich. Huszti returned a nemesis for Bayern Munich again when he scored from a wonderfully curved free kick in Hannover's 1–0 win at the start of the 2008–09 season. Hannover had not beaten Bayern at home for 20 years and thus Huszti had ended that drought.

In the 2007–08 season, he established himself as a key player at Hannover, who were having quite a successful season, always being placed in the upper half of the table. Huszti was certainly one of the most prominent midfielders in the German top division, having played all but one match for his team and scoring ten goals.

=== Zenit Saint Petersburg ===
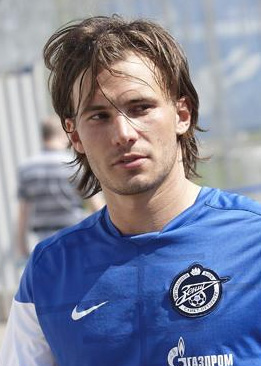
Huszti with Zenit Saint Petersburg in 2010

On 1 February 2009, Huszti moved to Zenit Saint Petersburg to replace Arsenal-bound Andrei Arshavin. He was also one of the main targets of Glasgow Celtic in the transfer period, but the Scottish club was outbid by Zenit's £2.5 million offer. He joined the team on the training camp in Turkey in early February 2009. He scored in his first official game on 18 February 2009 for Zenit Saint Petersburg a goal against VfB Stuttgart, after 1.53 minutes in the UEFA Cup. He made his league debut two months later against FC Lokomotiv Moscow as a substitute of Viktor Fayzulin.

=== Hannover 96 ===
On 23 July 2012, Huszti returned to Hannover 96 signing a three-year contract until June 2015. He gave four assists in his first match against VfL Wolfsburg.

=== Changchun Yatai ===
On 16 July 2014, Hannover 96 announced Huszti's transfer to Chinese Super League side Changchun Yatai. On 26 July 2014, he made his debut for the club in a 2–2 home draw against Beijing Guoan. He scored his first goal for the club on 3 August, helping Changchun to a 2–1 win over defending champions Guangzhou Evergrande.

=== Eintracht Frankfurt ===
On 30 December 2015, Huszti signed an 18-month contract with Bundesliga club Eintracht Frankfurt.

=== Return to Changchun Yatai ===
Huszti received an offer from his former club, the Chinese Changchun Yatai. German press reported a salary of €3.3 million annually. On 12 March 2017, he debuted for the second time for Changchun in 1–0 away defeat to Guangzhou R&F. On 9 April, he scored his first goal in his second spell for Yatai, a direct free kick in a 1–1 home draw against Liaoning Whowin. In a 3–2 away defeat at Shandong Luneng on 22 July 2017, he accidentally injured his own knees towards the end of the game, which unfortunately ended both his season and his second spell at Yatai early.

=== Videoton ===
On 11 January 2018, after twelve and a half years abroad, Huszti returned home and became a Videoton FC player. On 7 April, he scored his first league goal for the club from a free kick at home against Újpest in a 3–0 league victory. In the 2018–19 season, the team reached the group stage of the UEFA Europa League, where they finished third in the group. In his first full season, he won the Magyar Kupa.

Huzsti retired from professional football in 2020 after a knee surgery.

== International career ==
Huszti established himself as a regular member of the Hungary national team. He was first chosen during his time in Sopron, by then-manager Lothar Matthäus. His debut came on 25 April 2004 in a friendly with Japan, which he marked with a goal. Huszti scored his two goals for the national team in August 2004, in a Man of the Match display away to Scotland.

However, his international career suffered a setback when manager Péter Várhidi suspended him from the national team until the end of the year in June 2007. Hungary took this disciplinary action after Huszti walked out of their training camp ahead of two European Championship qualifying games. The player claimed this was because he was unsure whether he would be named as a starter.

In 2008, Huszti made a comeback for his country on 6 February, in a 1–1 draw against Slovakia.

On 9 September 2010, Huszti announced his retirement from the national team. He published an open letter following the Euro 2012 qualification match against Moldova in which he cited various reasons for his decision, including that he wanted to focus on his club career and that he did not like the current atmosphere around the national team. Following the announcement, former Hungarian international and Hertha BSC midfielder, Pál Dárdai suggested discussing the controversies between Huszti and Hungary national team manager Sándor Egervári claiming that Huszti is now one of the best Hungarian players and could be very useful for the 2014 FIFA World Cup qualifications. Years later, when the Hungarian nationals qualified to UEFA Euro 2016, Huszti reiterated his opinion that he had no intention to returning to the team.

== Managerial career ==
On 16 February 2021, Huszti was appointed as the manager of Debreceni VSC along with Gábor Toldi.

In February 2021, he debuted in the 2020-21 Nemzeti Bajnokság II managing Debreceni VSC against Szeged-Csanád Grosics Akadémia at the Szent Gellért Fórum. The final result was a convincing 5–0 victory for Debrecen.

On 17 October 2022, he was appointed as the coach of Fehérvár. On 6 December 2022, the club announced that Huszti and his assistant Gábor Toldi will switch positions, with Toldi technically becoming a head coach, but the final decisions will be still made by Huszti. On 14 March 2023, he was removed from his position due to negative performance of the team.

== Career statistics ==
=== Club ===
Appearances and goals by club, season and competition
Club	Season	League			Cup		Continental		Other		Total	
Club	Season	Division	Apps	Goals	Apps	Goals	Apps	Goals	Apps	Goals	Apps	Goals
Ferencváros	2002–03	Nemzeti Bajnokság I	0	0	0	0	0	0	—		0	0
Ferencváros	2003–04	Nemzeti Bajnokság I	1	0	0	0	0	0	—		1	0
Ferencváros	2004–05	Nemzeti Bajnokság I	23	3	4	1	8	2	—		35	6
Ferencváros	Total		24	3	4	1	8	2	0	0	36	6
FC Sopron (loan)	2003–04	Nemzeti Bajnokság I	14	6	0	0	—		—		14	6
Metz	2005–06	Ligue 1	18	1	2	0	—		1	0	21	1
Hannover 96	2006–07	Bundesliga	31	4	3	1	—		—		34	5
Hannover 96	2007–08	Bundesliga	33	10	2	0	—		—		35	10
Hannover 96	2008–09	Bundesliga	17	3	1	0	—		—		18	3
Hannover 96	Total		81	17	6	1	0	0	0	0	87	18
Zenit Saint Petersburg	2009	Russian Premier League	19	2	2	0	6	1	—		27	3
Zenit Saint Petersburg	2010	Russian Premier League	13	1	3	1	4	2	—		20	4
Zenit Saint Petersburg	2011–12	Russian Premier League	26	4	3	0	4	0	1	0	34	4
Zenit Saint Petersburg	Total		58	7	8	1	14	3	1	0	81	11
Hannover 96	2012–13	Bundesliga	21	9	2	0	12	5	—		35	14
Hannover 96	2013–14	Bundesliga	30	10	2	1	—		—		32	11
Hannover 96	Total		51	19	4	1	12	5	0	0	67	25
Changchun Yatai	2014	Chinese Super League	14	3	0	0	—		—		14	3
Changchun Yatai	2015	Chinese Super League	25	6	0	0	—		—		25	6
Changchun Yatai	Total		39	9	0	0	0	0	0	0	39	9
Eintracht Frankfurt	2015–16	Bundesliga	15	1	—		—		2	0	17	1
Eintracht Frankfurt	2016–17	Bundesliga	15	2	2	0	—		—		18	2
Eintracht Frankfurt	Total		30	3	2	0	0	0	2	0	34	3
Changchun Yatai	2017	Chinese Super League	16	4	0	0	—		—		16	4
Videoton	2017–18	Nemzeti Bajnokság I	9	1	—		—		—		9	1
Videoton	2018–19	Nemzeti Bajnokság I	27	5	9	4	11	2	—		47	11
Videoton	2019–20	Nemzeti Bajnokság I	7	1	0	0	4	1	—		11	2
Videoton	Total		43	7	9	4	15	3	0	0	67	14
Career total			374	76	35	8	49	13	4	0	462	97

=== International ===
Appearances and goals by national team and year
National team	Year	Apps	Goals
Hungary	2004	7	3
Hungary	2005	10	1
Hungary	2006	8	2
Hungary	2007	3	0
Hungary	2008	10	0
Hungary	2009	8	1
Hungary	2010	5	0
Total		51	7

Scores and results list Hungary's goal tally first.

No.	Date	Venue	Opponent	Score	Result	Competition
1.	25 April 2004	ZTE Arena, Zalaegerszeg, Hungary	Japan	3–2	3–2	Friendly
2.	18 August 2004	Hampden Park, Glasgow, Scotland	Scotland	1–0	3–0	Friendly
3.	18 August 2004	Hampden Park, Glasgow, Scotland	Scotland	2–0	3–0	Friendly
4.	4 June 2005	Laugardalsvöllur, Reykjavík, Iceland	Iceland	3–2	3–2	2006 FIFA World Cup qualification
5.	24 May 2006	Szusza Ferenc Stadion, Budapest, Hungary	New Zealand	1–0	2–0	Friendly
6.	6 September 2006	Bilino Polje Stadium, Zenica, Bosnia and Herzegovina	Bosnia and Herzegovina	1–0	3–1	UEFA Euro 2008 qualification
7.	5 September 2009	Ferenc Puskás Stadium, Budapest, Hungary	Sweden	1–1	1–2	2010 FIFA World Cup qualification

== Managerial statistics ==
As of 28 August 2021

Team	From	To	Record				
Team	From	To	G	W	D	L	Win %
Debreceni	16 February 2021	Present	21	11	4	6	52.38
Total			21	11	4	6	52.38

== Honours ==
Ferencváros

- Hungarian League runner-up: 2002–03, 2004–05
- Hungarian Cup runner-up: 2004–05

Zenit Saint Petersburg

- Russian Premier League: 2010, 2011–12
- Russian Cup: 2009–10
- Russian Super Cup: 2011

Videoton

- Nemzeti Bajnokság I: 2017-18
- Hungarian Cup: 2018-19

Individual

- Young Hungarian Player of the Year: 2004
- Hungarian Football Federation nominated him to be the best domestic footballer of the year: 2006, 2013
