= 2017–18 Eintracht Frankfurt season =

Eintracht Frankfurt
2017–18 season
- President: Peter Fischer
- Chairmen: Fredi Bobic; Axel Hellmann; Oliver Frankenbach
- Manager: Niko Kovač
- Stadium: Commerzbank-Arena
- Bundesliga: 8th
- DFB-Pokal: Winners
- Top goalscorer: League: Sébastien Haller (9 goals); All: Sébastien Haller (13 goals)
- Highest home attendance: 51,500
- Lowest home attendance: 45,100
- Average home league attendance: 49,159
- Biggest win: Schweinfurt 0–4 Frankfurt
- Biggest defeat: Augsburg 3–0 Frankfurt; Leverkusen 4–1 Frankfurt; Frankfurt 0–3 Hertha; Bayern 4–1 Frankfurt
Home colours	Away colours	Third colours
- All statistics correct as of 21 May 2018.

The 2017–18 Eintracht Frankfurt season was the 119th season in the football club's history and the 6th consecutive and 49th overall season in the top flight of German football, the Bundesliga, having been promoted from the 2. Bundesliga in 2012. In addition to the domestic league, Eintracht Frankfurt also were participating in this season's edition of the domestic cup, the DFB-Pokal. This was the 93rd season for Frankfurt in the Commerzbank-Arena, located in Frankfurt, Hesse, Germany. The season covers a period from 1 July 2017 to 30 June 2018.

The season ended with Eintracht winning the DFB-Pokal for the fifth time.

== Players ==
=== Squad information ===
As of 13 March 2018

Note: Flags indicate national team as defined under FIFA eligibility rules; some limited exceptions apply. Players may hold more than one non-FIFA nationality.

No.	Pos.	Nation	Player
1	GK	FIN	Lukáš Hrádecký
3	DF	FRA	Simon Falette
4	MF	CRO	Ante Rebić (on loan from Fiorentina)
5	MF	SUI	Gelson Fernandes
6	MF	NED	Jonathan de Guzmán
7	MF	GER	Danny Blum
8	FW	SRB	Luka Jović (on loan from Benfica)
9	FW	FRA	Sébastien Haller
10	MF	MEX	Marco Fabián
11	MF	SRB	Mijat Gaćinović
13	DF	MEX	Carlos Salcedo (on loan from Guadalajara)
14	FW	GER	Alexander Meier (captain)
15	DF	NED	Jetro Willems
17	MF	GHA	Kevin-Prince Boateng
19	DF	ARG	David Abraham
20	MF	JPN	Makoto Hasebe
21	MF	GER	Marc Stendera

No.	Pos.	Nation	Player
22	DF	USA	Timothy Chandler
23	DF	GER	Marco Russ
24	DF	GER	Danny da Costa
26	DF	GER	Deji-Ousman Beyreuther
27	MF	GER	Marius Wolf
28	MF	GER	Aymen Barkok
30	MF	GER	Şahverdi Çetin
31	FW	SWE	Branimir Hrgota
32	MF	CMR	Nelson Mandela Mbouhom
33	DF	ISR	Taleb Tawatha
34	GK	GER	Leon Bätge
35	DF	GER	Noel Knothe
37	GK	GER	Jan Zimmermann
38	FW	AZE	Renat Dadaşov
39	MF	ESP	Omar Mascarell
40	MF	JPN	Daichi Kamada
42	MF	BIH	Marijan Ćavar

=== Transfers ===
==== In ====
No.	Pos.	Name	Age	EU	Moving from	Type	Transfer Window	Contract ends	Transfer fee	Sources
3	Defender	Simon Falette	25	Yes	FC Metz	Transfer	Summer	30 June 2021	€2.7 million	
4	Striker	Ante Rebić	23	Yes	Fiorentina	Loan	Summer	30 June 2018	€500,000	
5	Midfielder	Gelson Fernandes	30	Yes	Stade Rennais	Transfer	Summer	30 June 2019	€350,000	
6	Midfielder	Jonathan de Guzmán	29	Yes	Napoli, was previously on loan to ChievoVerona	Free transfer	Summer	30 June 2020	—	
8	Striker	Luka Jović	19	No	SL Benfica	Loan	Summer	30 June 2019	€200,000	
9	Striker	Sébastien Haller	23	Yes	FC Utrecht	Transfer	Summer	30 June 2021	€7.0 million	
13	Defender	Carlos Salcedo	23	No	Guadalajara	Loan	Summer	30 June 2018	€450,000	
15	Defender	Jetro Willems	23	Yes	PSV	Transfer	Summer	30 June 2021	€5.0 million	
17	Midfielder	Kevin-Prince Boateng	30	Yes	UD Las Palmas	Free transfer	Summer	30 June 2020	—	
24	Defender	Danny da Costa	23	Yes	Bayer Leverkusen	Transfer	Summer	30 June 2021	€1.0 million	
26	Defender	Deji Beyreuther	18	Yes	Eintracht Frankfurt U19	Academy	Summer	30 June 2021	Free	
27	Forward	Marius Wolf	22	Yes	Hannover 96	Loan	Summer	30 June 2018	Undisclosed	
32	Striker	Nelson Mandela Mbouhom	18	No	Eintracht Frankfurt U19	Academy	Summer	30 June 2019	Free	
35	Defender	Noel Knothe	18	Yes	Eintracht Frankfurt U19	Academy	Summer	30 June 2020	Free	
37	Goalkeeper	Jan Zimmermann	32	Yes	1860 Munich	Free transfer	Summer	30 June 2019	—	
38	Striker	Renat Dadaşov	18	Yes	Eintracht Frankfurt U19	Academy	Summer	30 June 2022	Free	
40	Midfielder	Daichi Kamada	20	No	Sagan Tosu	Transfer	Summer	30 June 2021	€1.6 million	
42	Midfielder	Marijan Ćavar	19	Yes	Zrinjski Mostar	Transfer	Winter	30 June 2021	€200,000	

==== Out ====
No.	Pos.	Name	Age	EU	Moving to	Type	Transfer Window	Transfer fee	Sources
3	Defender	Guillermo Varela	24	Yes	Manchester United	Loan return	Summer	Free	
5	Defender	Jesús Vallejo	20	Yes	Real Madrid	Loan return	Summer	Free	
6	Defender	Bastian Oczipka	28	Yes	Schalke 04	Transfer	Summer	€4.5 million	
9	Striker	Haris Seferovic	25	Yes	SL Benfica	End of contract	Summer	Free	
13	Goalkeeper	Heinz Lindner	26	Yes	Grasshopper Club Zürich	End of contract	Summer	Free	
15	Defender	Michael Hector	25	Yes	Chelsea	Loan return	Summer	Free	
17	Midfielder	Ante Rebić	23	Yes	Fiorentina	Loan return	Summer	Free	
30	Striker	Shani Tarashaj	22	No	Everton	Loan return	Summer	Free	
36	Defender	Furkan Zorba	19	Yes	VfL Osnabrück	Transfer	Summer	Free	
18	Midfielder	Max Besuschkow	20	Yes	Holstein Kiel	Loan	Winter	Undisclosed	
25	Midfielder	Slobodan Medojević	27	No	Darmstadt 98	Released	Winter	Free	
29	Defender	Anderson Ordóñez	23	No	LDU de Quito	Loan	Winter	Undisclosed	
2	Defender	Yanni Regäsel	22	Yes	Free agent	Contract terminated by mutual consent	Winter	Free	

== Friendly matches ==
Win Draw Loss

4 July 2017	SV Heftrich (Germany)	0–15	(Germany) Eintracht Frankfurt	Idstein, Germany
18:30 CEST (UTC+2)		Report	Haller 4', 18', 25', 28', 39'; Oczipka 35', 44'; Blum 38'; Jović 47', 52', 73', 74', 81', 84'; Hrgota 64'	Stadium: Sportanlage Zissenbach; Attendance: 2,200

8 July 2017	Seattle Sounders FC (United States)	1–1	(Germany) Eintracht Frankfurt	Seattle, United States
13:00 PDT (UTC−7)	Dempsey 44'; Nouhou (yellow card) 86'	Report	Hrgota 29'; Besuschkow (yellow card) 39'; Ordóñez (yellow card) 53'; Kamada (yellow card) 67'; Fernandes (yellow card) 74'	Stadium: CenturyLink Field; Attendance: 40,667; Referee: Victor Rivas

14 July 2017	San Jose Earthquakes (United States)	4–1	(Germany) Eintracht Frankfurt	San Jose, United States
19:15 PDT (UTC−7)	Hoesen 13'; Wondolowski 18' (pen.); da Costa 61' (o.g.); Amarikwa 74' (pen.)	Report	Blum 83'	Stadium: Avaya Stadium; Attendance: 14,000

17 July 2017	Columbus Crew (United States)	1–0	(Germany) Eintracht Frankfurt	Columbus, United States
19:30 EST (UTC−4)	Abu (yellow card) 18'; Kamara 26'; Martínez (yellow card) 39'	Report	Fernandes (yellow card) 66'; Jović (yellow card) 74'	Stadium: Mapfre Stadium; Attendance: 11,301; Referee: Guido Gonzalez Jr.

27 July 2017	US Sassuolo (Italy)	1–1	(Germany) Eintracht Frankfurt	Brixen, Italy
17:00 CEST (UTC+2)	Matri 70'	Report	Gaćinović 32'	Attendance: 650

30 July 2017	Benevento (Italy)	1–1	(Germany) Eintracht Frankfurt	Gais, Italy
19:00 CEST (UTC+2)	Lucioni 34'	Report	Gaćinović 76'	Attendance: 1,200

5 August 2017	Eintracht Frankfurt (Germany)	3–0	(Spain) Real Betis	Wiesbaden, Germany
16:00 CEST (UTC+2)	Chandler 58'; Wolf 69'; Barkok 73'	Report		Stadium: BRITA-Arena; Attendance: 3,120; Referee: Kempkes

6 August 2017 Frankfurt Main Finance Cup	Eintracht Frankfurt (Germany)	5–2	(Germany) FSV Frankfurt	Frankfurt, Germany
15:30 CEST (UTC+2)	Kamada 7'; Hrgota 22'; Dadaşov 47'; Besuschkow 65' (pen.); Jović 82'	Report	Azaouagh 72'; Namavizadeh 83'	Stadium: Commerzbank-Arena; Attendance: 40,000

1 September 2017	SG Treis/Allendorf / SV Bauerbach XI (Germany)	0–13	(Germany) Eintracht Frankfurt	Marburg, Germany
17:30 CEST (UTC+2)			Boateng 17'; Besuschkow 20', 27', 54'; Hrgota 46'; Kamada 50'; Stendera 63'; Haller 65', 70', 89'; Rebic 77', 81'; Da Costa 87'	Stadium: Georg-Gaßmann-Stadion; Attendance: 3,400

6 October 2017	TSV Lehnerz (Germany)	0–3	(Germany) Eintracht Frankfurt	Fulda, Germany
18:00 CEST (UTC+2)		Report	Kamada 66'; Haller 73'; Hrgota 81'	Stadium: Sportpark Johannisau; Attendance: 4,000

10 November 2017	Eintracht Frankfurt (Germany)	5–3	(Germany) SV Sandhausen	Frankfurt, Germany
15:00 CET (UTC+1)	Kamada 16', 37'; Hrgota 47', 77'; Willems 90'		Zejnullahu 27'; Daghfous 75'; Linsmayer 89'	Stadium: Riederwaldstadion; Attendance: 500

6 January 2018	Eintracht Frankfurt (Germany)	2–1	(Germany) Erzgebirge Aue	San Pedro del Pinatar, Spain
15:00 CET (UTC+1)	Haller 52'; Hrgota 66'; Gaćinović 90'	Report	Maria 108'	Stadium: Pinatar Arena; Attendance: 300
Note: 3x45 minutes

7 March 2018	Eintracht Frankfurt (Germany)	5–3	(Russia) Kazanka Moscow	Frankfurt, Germany
16:00 CET (UTC+1)	Hrgota 21'; Fabián 23' (pen.); Blum 41'; Jović 65'; Kamada 79'	Report	Galadzhan 29', 73'; Tugarev 61' (pen.)	Stadium: Riederwaldstadion; Attendance: - Referee: Tobias Fritsch
Note: Closed session without audience

23 March 2018	Alemannia Haibach (Germany)	1–9	(Germany) Eintracht Frankfurt	Haibach, Germany
16:00 CET (UTC+1)	Pavlović 28'	Report	Kamada 6', 25'; Stendera 15'; Hrgota 22', 77', 78', 82'; Haller 38'; Blum 50'	Stadium: Stadion am Hohen Kreuz; Attendance: 3,000

== Competitions ==
Win Draw Loss

=== Overview ===
Competition	First match	Last match	Starting round	Final position	Record							
Competition	First match	Last match	Starting round	Final position	Pld	W	D	L	GF	GA	GD	Win %
Bundesliga	20 August 2017	12 May 2018	Matchday 1	8th	34	14	7	13	45	45	+0	41.18
DFB-Pokal	12 August 2017	19 May 2018	First round	Winners	6	6	0	0	16	2	+14	100.00
Total					40	20	7	13	61	47	+14	50.00

Last updated: 21 May 2018
Source: Competitions

=== Bundesliga ===
==== League table ====
Pos	Team	Pld	W	D	L	GF	GA	GD	Pts	Qualification or relegation
6	RB Leipzig	34	15	8	11	57	53	+4	53	Qualification for the Europa League second qualifying round
7	VfB Stuttgart	34	15	6	13	36	36	0	51	
8	Eintracht Frankfurt	34	14	7	13	45	45	0	49	Qualification for the Europa League group stage (Note: Eintracht Frankfurt qualified for the Europa League group stage by winning the 2017–18 DFB-Pokal.)
9	Borussia Mönchengladbach	34	13	8	13	47	52	−5	47	
10	Hertha BSC	34	10	13	11	43	46	−3	43	

Source: DFB
Rules for classification: 1) Points; 2) Goal difference; 3) Goals scored; 4) Head-to-head results; 5) Head-to-head away goals scored; 6) Away goals scored; 7) Play-off.

==== Results summary ====
Overall								Home						Away					
Pld	W	D	L	GF	GA	GD	Pts	W	D	L	GF	GA	GD	W	D	L	GF	GA	GD
34	14	7	13	45	45	0	49	8	4	5	26	19	+7	6	3	8	19	26	−7

Last updated: 21 May 2018.
Source: Bundesliga

==== Results by round ====
Round	1	2	3	4	5	6	7	8	9	10	11	12	13	14	15	16	17	18	19	20	21	22	23	24	25	26	27	28	29	30	31	32	33	34
Ground	A	H	A	H	A	A	H	A	H	A	H	A	H	A	H	A	H	H	A	H	A	H	H	A	H	A	H	A	H	A	H	A	H	A
Result	D	L	W	L	W	L	W	W	D	D	W	D	L	W	L	W	D	D	W	W	L	W	W	L	W	L	W	L	D	L	L	L	W	L
Position	9	13	11	13	10	11	8	7	7	10	7	7	9	8	9	7	8	9	7	4	6	4	3	4	4	5	4	6	5	7	7	7	7	8

Updated to match(es) played on 21 May 2018. Source: Bundesliga
A = Away; H = Home; W = Win; D = Draw; L = Loss

==== Matches ====
20 August 2017 1	SC Freiburg	0–0	Eintracht Frankfurt	Freiburg
15:30 CEST (UTC+2)		Report		Stadium: Schwarzwald-Stadion; Attendance: 24,000; Referee: Manuel Gräfe

26 August 2017 2	Eintracht Frankfurt	0–1	VfL Wolfsburg	Frankfurt
15:30 CEST (UTC+2)		Report	Didavi 22'	Stadium: Commerzbank-Arena; Attendance: 46,000; Referee: Benjamin Cortus

9 September 2017 3	Borussia Mönchengladbach	0–1	Eintracht Frankfurt	Mönchengladbach
15:30 CEST (UTC+2)		Report	Boateng 13'	Stadium: Borussia-Park; Attendance: 51,431; Referee: Robert Kampka

16 September 2017 4	Eintracht Frankfurt	1–2	FC Augsburg	Frankfurt
15:30 CEST (UTC+2)	Jović 79'	Report	Max 20'; Caiuby 77'	Stadium: Commerzbank-Arena; Attendance: 46,500; Referee: Christian Dingert

20 September 2017 5	1. FC Köln	0–1	Eintracht Frankfurt	Cologne
18:30 CEST (UTC+2)		Report	Haller 22' (pen.)	Stadium: RheinEnergieStadion; Attendance: 49,000; Referee: Martin Petersen

23 September 2017 6	RB Leipzig	2–1	Eintracht Frankfurt	Leipzig
15:30 CEST (UTC+2)	Augustin 28'; Werner 67'	Report	Rebić 77'	Stadium: Red Bull Arena; Attendance: 40,606; Referee: Benjamin Brand

30 September 2017 7	Eintracht Frankfurt	2–1	VfB Stuttgart	Frankfurt
15:30 CEST (UTC+2)	Rebić 42'; Haller 90+3'	Report	Terodde 61'	Stadium: Commerzbank-Arena; Attendance: 51,500; Referee: Felix Brych

14 October 2017 8	Hannover 96	1–2	Eintracht Frankfurt	Hanover
15:30 CEST (UTC+2)	Sané 36'	Report	Haller 10'; Rebić 89'	Stadium: HDI-Arena; Attendance: 43,500; Referee: Bastian Dankert

21 October 2017 9	Eintracht Frankfurt	2–2	Borussia Dortmund	Frankfurt
15:30 CEST (UTC+2)	Haller 64' (pen.); Wolf 68'	Report	Şahin 18'; Philipp 57'	Stadium: Commerzbank-Arena; Attendance: 51,500; Referee: Robert Hartmann

27 October 2017 10	Mainz 05	1–1	Eintracht Frankfurt	Mainz
20:30 CEST (UTC+2)	Serdar 71'	Report	Bell 37' (o.g.)	Stadium: Opel Arena; Attendance: 33,794; Referee: Sascha Stegemann

3 November 2017 11	Eintracht Frankfurt	2–1	Werder Bremen	Frankfurt
20:30 CET (UTC+1)	Rebić 17'; Haller 89'	Report	Moisander 24'	Stadium: Commerzbank-Arena; Attendance: 51,500; Referee: Benjamin Brand

18 November 2017 12	1899 Hoffenheim	1–1	Eintracht Frankfurt	Sinsheim
15:30 CET (UTC+1)	Uth 90+1'	Report	Boateng 13'	Stadium: Wirsol Rhein-Neckar-Arena; Attendance: 30,150; Referee: Felix Zwayer

25 November 2017 13	Eintracht Frankfurt	0–1	Bayer Leverkusen	Frankfurt
15:30 CET (UTC+1)		Report	Volland 76'	Stadium: Commerzbank-Arena; Attendance: 50,000; Referee: Patrick Ittrich

3 December 2017 14	Hertha BSC	1–2	Eintracht Frankfurt	Berlin
15:30 CET (UTC+1)	Selke 15'	Report	Wolf 26'; Boateng 80'	Stadium: Olympiastadion Berlin; Attendance: 38,781; Referee: Sören Storks

9 December 2017 15	Eintracht Frankfurt	0–1	Bayern Munich	Frankfurt
15:30 CET (UTC+1)		Report	Vidal 20'	Stadium: Commerzbank-Arena; Attendance: 51,500; Referee: Harm Osmers

12 December 2017 16	Hamburger SV	1–2	Eintracht Frankfurt	Hamburg
20:30 CET (UTC+1)	Papadopoulos 9'	Report	Wolf 16'; Gaćinović 24'	Stadium: Volksparkstadion; Attendance: 40,983; Referee: Manuel Gräfe

16 December 2017 17	Eintracht Frankfurt	2–2	Schalke 04	Frankfurt
15:30 CET (UTC+1)	Jović 2'; Haller 65'	Report	Embolo 82'; Naldo 90+5'	Stadium: Commerzbank-Arena; Attendance: 50,600; Referee: Robert Kampka

13 January 2018 18	Eintracht Frankfurt	1–1	SC Freiburg	Frankfurt
15:30 CET (UTC+1)	Haller 28'	Report	Koch 51'	Stadium: Commerzbank-Arena; Attendance: 45,300; Referee: Sascha Stegemann

20 January 2018 19	VfL Wolfsburg	1–3	Eintracht Frankfurt	Wolfsburg
15:30 CET (UTC+1)	Arnold 66'	Report	Haller 18'; Chandler 22'; Jović 85'	Stadium: Volkswagen Arena; Attendance: 24,450; Referee: Markus Schmidt

26 January 2018 20	Eintracht Frankfurt	2–0	Borussia Mönchengladbach	Frankfurt
20:30 CET (UTC+1)	Boateng 43'; Jović 90+2'	Report		Stadium: Commerzbank-Arena; Attendance: 47,500; Referee: Marco Fritz

4 February 2018 21	FC Augsburg	3–0	Eintracht Frankfurt	Augsburg
15:30 CET (UTC+1)	Koo 19'; Gregoritsch 76'; Richter 89'	Report		Stadium: WWK Arena; Attendance: 27,188; Referee: Harm Osmers

10 February 2018 22	Eintracht Frankfurt	4–2	1. FC Köln	Frankfurt
15:30 CET (UTC+1)	Rebić 15'; Russ 59'; Falette 65'; Wolf 67'	Report	Terodde 57' (pen.), 74'	Stadium: Commerzbank-Arena; Attendance: 47,700; Referee: Daniel Siebert

19 February 2018 23	Eintracht Frankfurt	2–1	RB Leipzig	Frankfurt
20:35 CET (UTC+1)	Chandler 22'; Boateng 26'	Report	Augustin 13'	Stadium: Commerzbank-Arena; Attendance: 45,100; Referee: Felix Zwayer
Note: The match, originally scheduled for 20:30 CET, was delayed to 20:35 CET due to a fan protest.

24 February 2018 24	VfB Stuttgart	1–0	Eintracht Frankfurt	Stuttgart
15:30 CET (UTC+1)	Thommy 13'	Report		Stadium: Mercedes-Benz Arena; Attendance: 55,418; Referee: Bibiana Steinhaus

3 March 2018 25	Eintracht Frankfurt	1–0	Hannover 96	Frankfurt
15:30 CET (UTC+1)	da Costa 39'	Report		Stadium: Commerzbank-Arena; Attendance: 48,500; Referee: Marco Fritz

11 March 2018 26	Borussia Dortmund	3–2	Eintracht Frankfurt	Dortmund
18:00 CET (UTC+1)	Russ 11' (o.g.); Batshuayi 77', 90+4'	Report	Jović 75'; Blum 90+1'	Stadium: Signal Iduna Park; Attendance: 81,360; Referee: Deniz Aytekin

17 March 2018 27	Eintracht Frankfurt	3–0	Mainz 05	Frankfurt
15:30 CET (UTC+1)	Boateng 6'; Jović 23'; Rebić 41'	Report		Stadium: Commerzbank-Arena; Attendance: 49,500; Referee: Daniel Siebert

1 April 2018 28	Werder Bremen	2–1	Eintracht Frankfurt	Bremen
15:30 CEST (UTC+2)	Junuzović 28'; Abraham 79' (o.g.)	Report	Jović 53'	Stadium: Weser-Stadion; Attendance: 42,100; Referee: Felix Zwayer

8 April 2018 29	Eintracht Frankfurt	1–1	1899 Hoffenheim	Frankfurt
18:00 CEST (UTC+2)	Jović 49'	Report	Gnabry 56'	Stadium: Commerzbank-Arena; Attendance: 50,500; Referee: Daniel Siebert

14 April 2018 30	Bayer Leverkusen	4–1	Eintracht Frankfurt	Leverkusen
15:30 CEST (UTC+2)	Brandt 20'; Volland 71', 77', 88'	Report	Fabián 23'	Stadium: BayArena; Attendance: 30,210; Referee: Felix Brych

21 April 2018 31	Eintracht Frankfurt	0–3	Hertha BSC	Frankfurt
15:30 CEST (UTC+2)		Report	Selke 57' (pen.); Leckie 77'; Esswein 90+1'	Stadium: Commerzbank-Arena; Attendance: 51,000; Referee: Sascha Stegemann

28 April 2018 32	Bayern Munich	4–1	Eintracht Frankfurt	Munich
15:30 CEST (UTC+2)	Dorsch 43'; Wagner 76'; Rafinha 87'; Süle 90'	Report	Haller 78'	Stadium: Allianz Arena; Attendance: 75,000; Referee: Christian Dingert

5 May 2018 33	Eintracht Frankfurt	3–0	Hamburger SV	Frankfurt
15:30 CEST (UTC+2)	Wolf 31'; Mascarell 77'; Meier 90+1'	Report		Stadium: Commerzbank-Arena; Attendance: 51,500; Referee: Deniz Aytekin

12 May 2018 34	Schalke 04	1–0	Eintracht Frankfurt	Gelsenkirchen
15:30 CEST (UTC+2)	Burgstaller 26'	Report		Stadium: Veltins-Arena; Attendance: 61,585; Referee: Frank Willenborg

=== DFB-Pokal ===
12 August 2017 First round	TuS Erndtebrück	0–3	Eintracht Frankfurt	Siegen
15:30 CEST (UTC+2)		Report	Chandler 35'; Gaćinović 72'; Haller 76'	Stadium: Leimbachstadion; Attendance: 13,106; Referee: Benedikt Kempkes

24 October 2017 Second round	Schweinfurt 05	0–4	Eintracht Frankfurt	Schweinfurt
20:45 CEST (UTC+2)		Report	Haller 14', 58'; Wolf 63'; Blum 85'	Stadium: Willy-Sachs-Stadion; Attendance: 15,060; Referee: Arne Aarnink

20 December 2017 Round of 16	1. FC Heidenheim	1–2 (a.e.t.)	Eintracht Frankfurt	Heidenheim
20:50 CET (UTC+1)	Schnatterer 96'	Report	Gaćinović 95'; Haller 109'	Stadium: Voith-Arena; Attendance: 11,000; Referee: Sven Jablonski

7 February 2018 Quarter-finals	Eintracht Frankfurt	3–0	Mainz 05	Frankfurt
18:30 CET (UTC+1)	Rebić 17'; Hack 53' (o.g.); Mascarell 62'	Report		Stadium: Commerzbank-Arena; Attendance: 48,200; Referee: Deniz Aytekin

18 April 2018 Semi-finals	Schalke 04	0–1	Eintracht Frankfurt	Gelsenkirchen
20:45 CEST (UTC+2)		Report	Jović 75'	Stadium: Veltins-Arena; Attendance: 60,000; Referee: Robert Hartmann

19 May 2018 Final	Bayern Munich	1–3	Eintracht Frankfurt	Berlin
20:00 CEST (UTC+2)	Lewandowski 53'	Report	Rebić 11', 84'; Gaćinović 90+6'	Stadium: Olympiastadion Berlin; Attendance: 74,322; Referee: Felix Zwayer

== Statistics ==
=== Appearances and goals ===
No.	Pos	Nat	Player	Total		Bundesliga		DFB-Pokal	
No.	Pos	Nat	Player	Apps	Goals	Apps	Goals	Apps	Goals
Goalkeepers
1	GK	(Finland) FIN	Lukáš Hrádecký	40	0	34	0	6	0
34	GK	(Germany) GER	Leon Bätge	0	0	0	0	0	0
37	GK	(Germany) GER	Jan Zimmermann	0	0	0	0	0	0
Defenders
3	DF	(France) FRA	Simon Falette	28	1	25+2	1	1	0
13	DF	(Mexico) MEX	Carlos Salcedo	24	0	17+3	0	4	0
15	DF	(Netherlands) NED	Jetro Willems	29	0	19+4	0	5+1	0
19	DF	(Argentina) ARG	David Abraham	30	0	27	0	3	0
22	DF	(United States) USA	Timothy Chandler	25	3	22+2	2	1	1
23	DF	(Germany) GER	Marco Russ	25	1	12+7	1	5+1	0
24	DF	(Germany) GER	Danny da Costa	21	1	13+4	1	2+2	0
26	DF	(Germany) GER	Deji Beyreuther	0	0	0	0	0	0
33	DF	(Israel) ISR	Taleb Tawatha	15	0	4+9	0	1+1	0
35	DF	(Germany) GER	Noel Knothe	0	0	0	0	0	0
Midfielders
5	MF	(Switzerland) SUI	Gelson Fernandes	22	0	12+7	0	1+2	0
6	MF	(Netherlands) NED	Jonathan de Guzmán	19	0	12+4	0	3	0
10	MF	(Mexico) MEX	Marco Fabián	9	1	3+4	1	1+1	0
11	MF	(Serbia) SRB	Mijat Gaćinović	33	4	22+7	1	2+2	2+1
17	MF	(Ghana) GHA	Kevin-Prince Boateng	36	6	27+4	6	5	0
20	MF	(Japan) JPN	Makoto Hasebe	29	0	23+1	0	5	0
21	MF	(Germany) GER	Marc Stendera	9	0	5+2	0	0+2	0
28	MF	(Germany) GER	Aymen Barkok	10	0	2+7	0	1	0
39	MF	(Spain) ESP	Omar Mascarell	12	2	8+1	1	3	1
40	MF	(Japan) JPN	Daichi Kamada	4	0	2+1	0	1	0
42	MF	(Bosnia and Herzegovina) BIH	Marijan Ćavar	1	0	0+1	0	0	0
Forwards
4	FW	(Croatia) CRO	Ante Rebić	28	9	21+4	5+1	3	3
7	FW	(Germany) GER	Danny Blum	3	2	0+2	1	0+1	1
8	FW	(Serbia) SRB	Luka Jović	27	9	9+13	4+4	2+3	1
9	FW	(France) FRA	Sébastien Haller	36	13	26+5	7+2	4+1	4
14	FW	(Germany) GER	Alexander Meier	1	1	0	0	0+1	0+1
27	FW	(Germany) GER	Marius Wolf	34	6	27+1	5	5+1	1
31	FW	(Sweden) SWE	Branimir Hrgota	8	0	2+4	0	2	0
32	FW	(Cameroon) CMR	Nelson Mandela Mbouhom	0	0	0	0	0	0
38	FW	(Azerbaijan) AZE	Renat Dadaşov	0	0	0	0	0	0
Players transferred out during the season
2	DF	(Germany) GER	Yanni Regäsel	0	0	0	0	0	0
18	MF	(Germany) GER	Max Besuschkow	0	0	0	0	0	0
25	MF	(Serbia) SRB	Slobodan Medojević	2	0	0+1	0	0+1	0
29	DF	(Ecuador) ECU	Anderson Ordóñez	0	0	0	0	0	0

Last updated: 19 May
Source: Competitions

=== Goalscorers ===
Rank	No.	Pos	Nat	Name	Bundesliga	DFB-Pokal	Total
1	9	FW	(France)	Sébastien Haller	9	4	13
2	8	FW	(Serbia)	Luka Jović	8	1	9
2	4	FW	(Croatia)	Ante Rebić	6	3	9
3	17	MF	(Ghana)	Kevin-Prince Boateng	6	0	6
3	27	FW	(Germany)	Marius Wolf	5	1	6
4	11	MF	(Serbia)	Mijat Gaćinović	1	3	4
5	22	DF	(United States)	Timothy Chandler	2	1	3
6	7	FW	(Germany)	Danny Blum	1	1	2
6	39	MF	(Spain)	Omar Mascarell	0	1	1
7	3	DF	(France)	Simon Falette	1	0	1
7	10	MF	(Mexico)	Marco Fabián	1	0	1
7	14	FW	(Germany)	Alexander Meier	1	0	1
7	23	DF	(Germany)	Marco Russ	1	0	1
7	24	DF	(Germany)	Danny da Costa	1	0	1
7				Own goal	1	0	1
Totals					43	16	59

Last updated: 19 May 2018

=== Clean sheets ===
Rank	No.	Pos	Nat	Name	Bundesliga	DFB-Pokal	Total
1	1	GK	(Finland)	Lukáš Hrádecký	7	4	11
Totals					7	4	11

Last updated: 19 May 2018

=== Disciplinary record ===
No.	Pos	Nat	Player	Bundesliga			DFB-Pokal			Total		
No.	Pos	Nat	Player	Booked	(yellow card) (yellow-red card)	Sent off (straight red)	Booked	(yellow card) (yellow-red card)	Sent off (straight red)	Booked	(yellow card) (yellow-red card)	Sent off (straight red)
Totals
1	GK	(Finland)	Lukáš Hrádecký	1	0	0	0	0	0	1	0	0
3	DF	(France)	Simon Falette	10	0	1	0	0	0	10	0	1
4	FW	(Croatia)	Ante Rebić	8	0	0	1	0	0	9	0	0
5	MF	(Switzerland)	Gelson Fernandes	4	0	0	0	0	0	4	0	0
6	MF	(Netherlands)	Jonathan de Guzmán	2	0	0	0	0	0	2	0	0
8	FW	(Serbia)	Luka Jović	2	0	0	1	0	0	3	0	0
9	FW	(France)	Sébastien Haller	2	0	0	1	0	0	3	0	0
11	MF	(Serbia)	Mijat Gaćinović	4	0	0	0	0	0	4	0	0
13	DF	(Mexico)	Carlos Salcedo	5	0	0	2	0	0	7	0	0
15	DF	(Netherlands)	Jetro Willems	4	0	0	2	0	0	6	0	0
17	MF	(Ghana)	Kevin-Prince Boateng	5	0	0	0	0	0	5	0	0
19	DF	(Argentina)	David Abraham	3	0	0	0	0	1	3	0	1
20	MF	(Japan)	Makoto Hasebe	3	0	1	2	0	1	5	0	1
21	MF	(Germany)	Marc Stendera	1	0	0	0	0	0	1	0	0
22	DF	(United States)	Timothy Chandler	3	0	0	0	0	0	3	0	0
23	DF	(Germany)	Marco Russ	3	0	0	0	0	0	3	0	0
24	DF	(Germany)	Danny da Costa	1	0	0	0	0	0	1	0	0
27	FW	(Germany)	Marius Wolf	4	0	0	0	0	0	4	0	0
28	MF	(Germany)	Aymen Barkok	1	0	0	0	0	0	1	0	0
31	FW	(Sweden)	Branimir Hrgota	1	0	0	0	0	0	1	0	0
33	DF	(Israel)	Taleb Tawatha	1	0	0	0	0	0	1	0	0
39	MF	(Spain)	Omar Mascarell	4	0	0	1	0	0	5	0	0
Totals				72	0	2	10	0	2	82	0	4

Last updated: 19 May 2018
