= 2016–17 Eintracht Frankfurt season =

Eintracht Frankfurt
2016–17 season
- Chairman: Fredi Bobič; Oliver Frankenbach; Axel Hellmann
- Manager: Niko Kovač
- Stadium: Commerzbank-Arena
- Bundesliga: 11th
- DFB-Pokal: Runners-up
- Top goalscorer: League: Marco Fabián (7 goals); All: Marco Fabián (7 goals)
- Highest home attendance: 51,500
- Lowest home attendance: 6,300
- Average home league attendance: 49,176
- Biggest win: Hamburg 0–3 Frankfurt; Frankfurt 3–0 Mainz
- Biggest defeat: Leipzig 3–0 Frankfurt; Leverkusen 3–0 Frankfurt; Bayern 3–0 Frankfurt
Home colours	Away colours	Third colours
- All statistics correct as of 27 May 2017.

The 2016–17 Eintracht Frankfurt season was the 117th season in the club's football history. In 2016–17 the club played in the Bundesliga, the top tier of German football. It was the club's fifth season back in the Bundesliga and the 48th overall.

== Players ==
=== Squad ===
Note: Flags indicate national team as defined under FIFA eligibility rules; some limited exceptions apply. Players may hold more than one non-FIFA nationality.

No.	Pos.	Nation	Player
1	GK	FIN	Lukáš Hrádecký
2	DF	GER	Yanni Regäsel
3	DF	URU	Guillermo Varela (on loan from Manchester United)
4	DF	GER	Marco Russ
5	DF	ESP	Jesús Vallejo (on loan from Real Madrid)
6	DF	GER	Bastian Oczipka
7	FW	GER	Danny Blum
9	FW	SUI	Haris Seferovic
10	MF	MEX	Marco Fabián
11	MF	SRB	Mijat Gaćinović
13	GK	AUT	Heinz Lindner
14	FW	GER	Alexander Meier (captain)
15	DF	JAM	Michael Hector (on loan from Chelsea)
17	FW	CRO	Ante Rebić (on loan from Fiorentina)
18	MF	GER	Max Besuschkow

No.	Pos.	Nation	Player
19	DF	ARG	David Abraham
20	MF	JPN	Makoto Hasebe
21	MF	GER	Marc Stendera
22	DF	USA	Timothy Chandler
24	FW	GER	Marius Wolf
25	MF	SRB	Slobodan Medojević
28	MF	GER	Aymen Barkok
29	DF	ECU	Anderson Ordóñez
30	FW	SUI	Shani Tarashaj (on loan from Everton)
31	MF	SWE	Branimir Hrgota
33	DF	ISR	Taleb Tawatha
34	GK	GER	Leon Bätge
36	DF	GER	Furkan Zorba
37	MF	GER	Miguel Blanco-Lopez
39	MF	ESP	Omar Mascarell

=== Transfers ===
==== In ====
No.	Pos.	Name	Age	EU	Moving from	Type	Transfer Window	Contract ends	Transfer fee	Sources
3	Defender	Guillermo Varela	23	Yes	Manchester United	Loan	Summer	30 June 2017	Undisclosed	
5	Defender	Jesús Vallejo	19	Yes	Real Madrid	Loan	Summer	30 June 2017	Undisclosed	
7	Midfielder	Danny Blum	25	Yes	1. FC Nürnberg	Free transfer	Summer	30 June 2017	—	
15	Defender	Michael Hector	24	Yes	Chelsea	Loan	Summer	30 June 2017	Undisclosed	
17	Striker	Ante Rebić	22	Yes	ACF Fiorentina	Loan	Summer	30 June 2017	Undisclosed	
28	Midfielder	Aymen Barkok	18	Yes	Eintracht Frankfurt U19	Academy	Summer	30 June 2020	Free	
30	Striker	Shani Tarashaj	21	No	Everton	Loan	Summer	30 June 2017	Undisclosed	
31	Striker	Branimir Hrgota	23	Yes	Borussia Mönchengladbach	Free transfer	Summer	30 June 2019	—	
32	Midfielder	Joel Gerezgiher	20	Yes	FSV Frankfurt	Loan return	Summer	30 June 2018	—	
33	Defender	Taleb Tawatha	24	No	Maccabi Haifa	Transfer	Summer	30 June 2019	€1.2 million	
34	Goalkeeper	Leon Bätge	18	Yes	Eintracht Frankfurt U19	Academy	Summer	30 June 2017	Free	
36	Defender	Furkan Zorba	18	Yes	Eintracht Frankfurt U19	Academy	Summer	30 June 2018	Free	
37	Midfielder	Miguel Blanco-Lopez	17	Yes	Eintracht Frankfurt U19	Academy	Summer	30 June 2017	Free	
39	Midfielder	Omar Mascarell	23	Yes	Real Madrid	Transfer	Summer	30 June 2019	€1.0 million	
18	Midfielder	Max Besuschkow	19	Yes	VfB Stuttgart	Transfer	Winter	30 June 2020	€100,000	
24	Forward	Marius Wolf	21	Yes	Hannover 96	Loan	Winter	30 June 2017	—	
29	Defender	Andersson Ordóñez	22	No	Barcelona SC	Transfer	Winter	30 June 2020	€1.0 million	

==== Out ====
No.	Pos.	Name	Age	EU	Moving to	Type	Transfer Window	Transfer fee	Sources
3	Defender	Kaan Ayhan	21	Yes	FC Schalke 04	Loan end	Summer	Free	
5	Defender	Carlos Zambrano	26	No	Rubin Kazan	Transfer	Summer	€3.5 million	
7	Midfielder	Stefan Reinartz	27	Yes	-	Retired	Summer	Free	
15	Defender	Constant Djakpa	29	No	Unknown	End of contract	Summer	Free	
16	Midfielder	Stefan Aigner	28	Yes	TSV 1860 Munich	Transfer	Summer	€3.0 million	
24	Forward	Luca Waldschmidt	20	Yes	Hamburger SV	Transfer	Summer	€1.3 million	
27	Midfielder	Aleksandar Ignjovski	25	No	SC Freiburg	Transfer	Summer	€750,000	
28	Midfielder	Sonny Kittel	23	Yes	FC Ingolstadt	End of contract	Summer	Free	
29	Goalkeeper	Emil Balayev	22	No	Qarabağ FK	End of contract	Summer	Free	
30	Forward	Luc Castaignos	23	Yes	Sporting CP	Transfer	Summer	€2.5 million	
32	Midfielder	Änis Ben-Hatira	27	Yes	Darmstadt 98	End of contract	Summer	Free	
33	Goalkeeper	Yannick Zummack	20	Yes	Sportfreunde Lotte	End of contract	Summer	Free	
35	Midfielder	Nico Rinderknecht	18	Yes	FC Ingolstadt	End of contract	Summer	Free	
8	Midfielder	Szabolcs Huszti	33	Yes	Changchun Yatai	Transfer	Winter	Free	
18	Midfielder	Johannes Flum	29	Yes	FC St. Pauli	Transfer	Winter	Free	
32	Midfielder	Joel Gerezgiher	21	Yes	Holstein Kiel	Released	Winter	30 June 2018	
38	Forward	Enis Bunjaki	19	Yes	FC Twente	Released	Winter	Free	

== Friendly matches ==
Win Draw Loss

9 July 2016 Friendly	TSG Messel (Germany)	0–15	(Germany) Eintracht Frankfurt	Messel, Germany
17:00 CEST (UTC+2)		Report	Abraham 24'; Hrgota 29'; Fabián 37'; Oczipka 44'; Meier 47', 50', 87', 90'; Bunjaki 56', 79'; Huszti 66'; Rebić 72', 81', 83'; Blum 89'	Stadium: Sportplatz Messel; Attendance: 2,450

23 July 2016 Friendly	Wehen Wiesbaden (Germany)	2–2	(Germany) Eintracht Frankfurt	Wiesbaden, Germany
16:00 CEST (UTC+2)	Blacha 3'; Lorenz 47'	Report	Gaćinović 17'; Meier 59'	Stadium: BRITA-Arena; Referee: Robert Kampka

30 July 2016 Friendly	TSV Steinbach (Germany)	0–5	(Germany) Eintracht Frankfurt	Haiger, Germany
17:00 CEST (UTC+2)		Report	Castaignos 7'; Hrgota 40', 51'; Blum 65'; Bunjaki 85'	Stadium: SIBRE-Sportpark; Attendance: 3,900; Referee: Rafalski

3 August 2016 Friendly	Eintracht Frankfurt (Germany)	1–0	(United Arab Emirates) Al-Ahli	Bruneck, Italy
18:00 CEST (UTC+2)	Bunjaki 42'	Report		Stadium: Sportpark Reischach; Attendance: 300

6 August 2016 Trofeo Bortolotti	Atalanta (Italy)	2–2 (3–4 p)	(Germany) Eintracht Frankfurt	Bergamo, Italy
20:30 CEST (UTC+2)	Gómez 14', 85'	Report	Meier 27', 40'	Stadium: Stadio Atleti Azzurri d'Italia; Attendance: 10,000
	Penalties
	Gómez (penalty scored); Petagna (penalty scored); Raimondi (penalty scored); Sportiello (penalty missed); Zukanović (penalty missed)		(penalty scored) Huszti; (penalty missed) Seferovic; (penalty scored) Blum; (penalty scored) Mascarell; (penalty scored) Hrgota

14 August 2016 Frankfurt Main Finance Cup	Eintracht Frankfurt (Germany)	3–1	(Spain) Celta Vigo	Frankfurt, Germany
15:00 CEST (UTC+2)	Hrgota 11', 49'; Mallo 80' (o.g.)	Report	Sisto 58'	Stadium: Commerzbank-Arena; Attendance: 40,000

3 September 2016 Friendly	Chemie Leipzig (Germany)	2–2	(Germany) Eintracht Frankfurt	Leipzig, Germany
14:30 CEST (UTC+2)	Schmidt 45'; Müller 53'	Report	Meier 31'; Blum 50'	Stadium: Alfred-Kunze-Sportpark; Attendance: 4,999

4 October 2016 Friendly	KSV Klein-Karben (Germany)	2–15	(Germany) Eintracht Frankfurt	Karben, Germany
18:00 CEST (UTC+2)	Götz 9'; Jung 67'	Report	Meier 12'; Tawatha 15'; Blum 38', 74', 85'; Hrgota 33', 39', 41', 45', 56'; Huszti 48'; Barkok 75', 78', 87'; , 81' (o.g.)	Stadium: Günter-Reutzel-Sportfeld; Attendance: 1,500; Referee: Sürer

7 October 2016 Friendly	SV Sandhausen (Germany)	3–1	(Germany) Eintracht Frankfurt	Sandhausen, Germany
18:00 CEST (UTC+2)	Höler 24'; Wooten 45'; Kuhn 85'	Report	Meier 59'	Stadium: Hardtwaldstadion; Attendance: 1,500

10 November 2016 Friendly	FSV Frankfurt (Germany)	3–2	(Germany) Eintracht Frankfurt	Frankfurt, Germany
18:30 CEST (UTC+2)	Ochs 35'; Kader 40', 58'	Report	Hrgota 37', 76'	Stadium: Bornheimer Hang; Attendance: 2,285

8 January 2017 Friendly	Eintracht Frankfurt (Germany)	3–0	(China) Changchun Yatai	Abu Dhabi, United Arab Emirates
18:30 GST (UTC+04:00)	Seferovic 11'; Hrgota 67', 77'	Report		Stadium: Pitch at New York University Abu Dhabi; Attendance: 100

14 January 2017 Friendly	Eintracht Frankfurt (Germany)	0–0	(Russia) Zenit Saint Petersburg	United Arab Emirates
18:30 GST (UTC+04:00)		Report		Stadium: Pitch at Ja Jebel Ali Golf Resort; Attendance: 50; Referee: Salem

7 March 2017 Friendly	Hessen Dreieich (Germany)	2–1	(Germany) Eintracht Frankfurt	Dreieich, Germany
18:30 CEST (UTC+2)	Di Maria 39'; Weiss 60'	Report	Gaćinović 69'	Stadium: Sportpark Dreieich; Attendance: 2,000

24 March 2017 Friendly	Eintracht Frankfurt (Germany)	0–1	(Germany) Würzburger Kickers	Alzenau, Germany
18:00 CEST (UTC+2)			Königs 79'	Stadium: Sportzentrum am Prischoß; Attendance: 1,200

=== Schauinsland-Reisen-Cup ===
17 July 2016 Semi-finals	MSV Duisburg (Germany)	0–0 (5–4 p)	(Germany) Eintracht Frankfurt	Duisburg, Germany
13:00 CEST (UTC+2)		Report		Stadium: Schauinsland-Reisen-Arena; Attendance: 5,026
	Penalties
	Albutat (penalty missed); Onuegbu (penalty scored); Wolze (penalty scored); Brandstetter (penalty scored); Bajić (penalty scored); Schnellhardt (penalty scored)		(penalty scored) Meier; (penalty scored) Huszti; (penalty scored) Hasebe; (penalty missed) Rebić; (penalty scored) Blum; (penalty missed) Flum
Note: The match was only 45 minutes.

17 July 2016 Third place play-off	Eintracht Frankfurt (Germany)	3–1	(France) Nantes	Duisburg, Germany
16:10 CEST (UTC+2)	Castaignos 6'; Mascarell 15'; Aigner 38'	Report	Alégué 43'	Stadium: Schauinsland-Reisen-Arena; Attendance: 5,026
Note: The match was only 45 minutes.

== Competitions ==
Win Draw Loss

=== Overview ===
Competition	First match	Last match	Starting round	Final position	Record							
Competition	First match	Last match	Starting round	Final position	Pld	W	D	L	GF	GA	GD	Win %
Bundesliga	27 August 2016	20 May 2017	Matchday 1	11th	34	11	9	14	36	43	−7	32.35
DFB-Pokal	21 August 2016	27 May 2017	First round	Runners-up	6	2	3	1	6	5	+1	33.33
Total					40	13	12	15	42	48	−6	32.50

Last updated: 27 May 2017
Source: Competitions

=== Bundesliga ===
==== League table ====
Pos	Team	Pld	W	D	L	GF	GA	GD	Pts
9	Borussia Mönchengladbach	34	12	9	13	45	49	−4	45
10	Schalke 04	34	11	10	13	45	40	+5	43
11	Eintracht Frankfurt	34	11	9	14	36	43	−7	42
12	Bayer Leverkusen	34	11	8	15	53	55	−2	41
13	FC Augsburg	34	9	11	14	35	51	−16	38

Source: DFB
Rules for classification: 1) Points; 2) Goal difference; 3) Goals scored; 4) Head-to-head points; 5) Head-to-head goal difference; 6) Head-to-head away goals scored; 7) Away goals scored; 8) Play-off.

==== Results summary ====
Overall								Home						Away					
Pld	W	D	L	GF	GA	GD	Pts	W	D	L	GF	GA	GD	W	D	L	GF	GA	GD
34	11	9	14	36	43	−7	42	7	7	3	24	18	+6	4	2	11	12	25	−13

Last updated: 27 May 2017.
Source: Bundesliga

==== Results by round ====
Round	1	2	3	4	5	6	7	8	9	10	11	12	13	14	15	16	17	18	19	20	21	22	23	24	25	26	27	28	29	30	31	32	33	34
Ground	H	A	H	A	H	A	H	A	A	H	A	H	A	H	A	H	A	A	H	A	H	A	H	A	H	H	A	H	A	H	A	H	A	H
Result	W	L	W	W	D	L	D	W	D	W	W	W	D	D	L	W	L	W	W	L	L	L	L	L	D	D	L	D	L	W	L	L	L	D
Position	7	9	7	4	5	8	8	7	7	7	7	4	5	5	6	4	6	3	3	3	5	6	6	6	7	7	8	9	10	9	11	11	11	11

Updated to match(es) played on 27 May 2017. Source: Bundesliga
A = Away; H = Home; W = Win; D = Draw; L = Loss

==== Matches ====
27 August 2016 1	Eintracht Frankfurt	1–0	Schalke 04	Frankfurt
15:30 CEST (UTC+2)	Meier 13'; Hector (red card) 79'; Varela (yellow card) 87'; Mascarell (yellow card) 88'	Report	Júnior Caiçara (yellow card) 67'; Geis (yellow card) 89'	Stadium: Commerzbank-Arena; Attendance: 47,000; Referee: Wolfgang Stark

10 September 2016 2	Darmstadt 98	1–0	Eintracht Frankfurt	Darmstadt
15:30 CEST (UTC+2)	Gondorf (yellow card) 76'; Sirigu 90'	Report	Abraham (yellow card) 58'; Gaćinović (yellow card) 90+1'	Stadium: Jonathan-Heimes-Stadion am Böllenfalltor; Attendance: 17,000; Referee: Felix Zwayer

17 September 2016 3	Eintracht Frankfurt	2–1	Bayer Leverkusen	Frankfurt
15:30 CEST (UTC+2)	Meier 53', (yellow card) 68'; Fabián (yellow card) 73', (goal) 79'; Chandler (yellow card) 87'	Report	Hernández 60'	Stadium: Commerzbank-Arena; Attendance: 43,000; Referee: Christian Dingert

20 September 2016 4	FC Ingolstadt	0–2	Eintracht Frankfurt	Ingolstadt
20:00 CEST (UTC+2)		Report	Abraham 45+2'; Oczipka 50'; Seferovic (yellow card) 82'	Stadium: Audi Sportpark; Attendance: 14,259; Referee: Sascha Stegemann

24 September 2016 5	Eintracht Frankfurt	3–3	Hertha BSC	Frankfurt
15:30 CEST (UTC+2)	Huszti (yellow card) 17'; Fabián 39'; Meier 45'; Oczipka (yellow card) 71'; Mascarell (yellow card) 76'; Rebić (yellow card) 85'; Hector 90+2'	Report	Ibišević 19' (pen.), 58'; Pekarík (yellow card) 42'; Esswein 65'; Schieber (yellow card) 85'	Stadium: Commerzbank-Arena; Attendance: 45,000; Referee: Felix Brych

1 October 2016 6	SC Freiburg	1–0	Eintracht Frankfurt	Freiburg im Breisgau
15:30 CEST (UTC+2)	Grifo 4'; Niederlechner (yellow card) 46'; Bulut (yellow card) 61'; Abrashi (yellow card) 67'; Philipp (yellow card) 84'	Report	Vallejo (yellow card) 4'; Fabián (yellow card) 45+1'; Mascarell (yellow card) 67'	Stadium: Schwarzwald-Stadion; Attendance: 24,000; Referee: Marco Fritz

15 October 2016 7	Eintracht Frankfurt	2–2	Bayern Munich	Frankfurt
15:30 CEST (UTC+2)	Hector (yellow card) 8'; Huszti (yellow card) 34' (yellow-red card) 65', (goal) 43'; Fabián 78'; Chandler (yellow card) 86'; Hrádecký (yellow card) 90+1'	Report	Robben 10'; Alonso (yellow card) 21'; Hummels (yellow card) 31'; Kimmich 62'; Sanches (yellow card) 65'; Lahm (yellow card) 74'	Stadium: Commerzbank-Arena; Attendance: 49,500; Referee: Bastian Dankert
Note: Tom Starke was sent off from the bench in the 66th minute, but was not listed as a substitute.

21 October 2016 8	Hamburger SV	0–3	Eintracht Frankfurt	Hamburg
20:30 CEST (UTC+2)	Diekmeier (yellow card) 36' (yellow-red card) 57'	Report	Gaćinović (yellow card) 25'; Oczipka (yellow card) 30'; Holtby 35' (o.g.); Chandler (yellow card) 59'; Tarashaj 60'; Seferovic 69'; Fabián (yellow card) 82'	Stadium: Volksparkstadion; Attendance: 52,258; Referee: Günter Perl

28 October 2016 9	Borussia Mönchengladbach	0–0	Eintracht Frankfurt	Mönchengladbach
20:30 CEST (UTC+2)	Johnson (yellow card) 44'	Report	Huszti (yellow card) 80'; Tarashaj (yellow card) 84'	Stadium: BORUSSIA-PARK; Attendance: 54,014; Referee: Felix Zwayer

5 November 2016 10	Eintracht Frankfurt	1–0	1. FC Köln	Frankfurt
18:30 CET (UTC+1)	Gaćinović 5'; Abraham (yellow card) 40'; Mascarell (yellow card) 65'; Fabián (yellow card) 90+1'	Report	Rausch (yellow card) 43'; Mavraj (yellow card) 79'; Osako (yellow card) 90'	Stadium: Commerzbank-Arena; Attendance: 51,500; Referee: Deniz Aytekin

20 November 2016 11	Werder Bremen	1–2	Eintracht Frankfurt	Bremen
17:30 CET (UTC+1)	Grillitsch 38'; Gnabry (yellow card) 73'	Report	Mascarell (yellow card) 24'; Meier 52'; Vallejo (yellow card) 62'; Barkok 90'	Stadium: Weser-Stadion; Attendance: 39,261; Referee: Robert Kampka

26 November 2016 12	Eintracht Frankfurt	2–1	Borussia Dortmund	Frankfurt
15:30 CET (UTC+1)	Hector (yellow card) 34'; Fabián (yellow card) 45+4'; Huszti 46'; Seferovic 79'; Gaćinović (yellow card) 90'; Hrádecký (yellow card) 90+1'	Report	Papastathopoulos (yellow card) 65'; Castro (yellow card) 74'; Aubameyang 77'; Schmelzer (yellow card) 90+5'	Stadium: Commerzbank-Arena; Attendance: 51,500; Referee: Wolfgang Stark

4 December 2016 13	FC Augsburg	1–1	Eintracht Frankfurt	Augsburg
17:30 CET (UTC+1)	Janker (yellow card) 3'; Max (yellow card) 33'; Ji 34'; Kohr (yellow card) 80'	Report	Hrgota 11'; Vallejo (yellow card) 28'; Hasebe (yellow card) 37'	Stadium: WWK ARENA; Attendance: 26,549; Referee: Sascha Stegemann

9 December 2016 14	Eintracht Frankfurt	0–0	1899 Hoffenheim	Frankfurt
20:30 CET (UTC+1)	Fabián (yellow card) 52'; Chandler (yellow card) 73' (red card) 82'; Mascarell (yellow card) 77'; Oczipka (yellow card) 82'; Rebić (yellow card) 87'	Report	Polanski (yellow card) 68'; Uth (yellow card) 82'; Wagner (yellow card) 88'	Stadium: Commerzbank-Arena; Attendance: 47,000; Referee: Christian Dingert

17 December 2016 15	VfL Wolfsburg	1–0	Eintracht Frankfurt	Wolfsburg
18:30 CET (UTC+1)	Luiz Gustavo (yellow card) 8'; Bruma 33'; Guilavogui (yellow card) 38'; Gómez (yellow card) 80'	Report	Rebić (yellow card) 23'; Huszti (yellow card) 34'; Mascarell (yellow card) 61'; Abraham (yellow card) 90'	Stadium: VOLKSWAGEN ARENA; Attendance: 26,967; Referee: Felix Brych

20 December 2016 16	Eintracht Frankfurt	3–0	Mainz 05	Frankfurt
20:00 CET (UTC+1)	Hrgota 18', 85', (yellow card) 48'; Rebić (yellow card) 53'; Mascarell (yellow card) 64'; Barkok 75'	Report	Córdoba (red card) 55'	Stadium: Commerzbank-Arena; Attendance: 48,500; Referee: Günter Perl

21 January 2017 17	RB Leipzig	3–0	Eintracht Frankfurt	Leipzig
18:30 CET (UTC+1)	Compper 6'; Werner 45+4'; Vallejo 67' (o.g.); Selke (yellow card) 71'	Report	Hrádecký (red card) 3'; Rebić (yellow card) 15'; Mascarell (yellow card) 69'	Stadium: Red Bull Arena; Attendance: 42,558; Referee: Deniz Aytekin

27 January 2017 18	Schalke 04	0–1	Eintracht Frankfurt	Gelsenkirchen
20:30 CET (UTC+1)	Bentaleb (yellow card) 77'; Kolašinac (yellow card) 86'	Report	Meier 33'; Oczipka (yellow card) 48'	Stadium: VELTINS-Arena; Attendance: 60,885; Referee: Robert Hartmann

5 February 2017 19	Eintracht Frankfurt	2–0	Darmstadt 98	Frankfurt
17:30 CET (UTC+1)	Hasebe 74' (pen.); Gaćinović (yellow card) 82'; Rebić 83'; Barkok (yellow card) 89'	Report	Heller (yellow card) 27'; Niemeyer (yellow card) 36'; Milošević (yellow card) 73'; Sulu (yellow card) 78'	Stadium: Commerzbank-Arena; Attendance: 51,000; Referee: Manuel Gräfe

11 February 2017 20	Bayer Leverkusen	3–0	Eintracht Frankfurt	Leverkusen
15:30 CET (UTC+1)	Hernández 5', 63'; Boeder (yellow card) 21'; Toprak (yellow card) 37'; Volland 78'	Report	Gaćinović (yellow card) 36'	Stadium: BayArena; Attendance: 28,882; Referee: Benjamin Cortus

18 February 2017 21	Eintracht Frankfurt	0–2	FC Ingolstadt	Frankfurt
15:30 CET (UTC+1)	Mascarell (yellow card) 23'; Abraham (red card) 34'; Rebić (yellow card) 35'; Hector (yellow card) 68'; Chandler (yellow card) 78'	Report	Brégerie 26'; Groß 69' (pen.); Leckie (red card) 81'	Stadium: Commerzbank-Arena; Attendance: 46,300; Referee: Guido Winkmann

25 February 2017 22	Hertha BSC	2–0	Eintracht Frankfurt	Berlin
18:30 CET (UTC+1)	Brooks (yellow card) 4'; Haraguchi (yellow card) 40'; Ibišević 52'; Darida 83'	Report	Gaćinović (yellow card) 58'; Hector (yellow card) 75'; Seferovic (red card) 78'	Stadium: Olympiastadion Berlin; Attendance: 43,323; Referee: Sascha Stegemann

5 March 2017 23	Eintracht Frankfurt	1–2	SC Freiburg	Frankfurt
15:30 CET (UTC+1)	Hrgota 11'; Gaćinović (yellow card) 37'; Oczipka (yellow card) 75'	Report	Niederlechner 25', 59'; Günter (yellow card) 38'	Stadium: Commerzbank-Arena; Attendance: 51,500; Referee: Günter Perl

11 March 2017 24	Bayern Munich	3–0	Eintracht Frankfurt	Munich
15:30 CET (UTC+1)	Vidal (yellow card) 36'; Lewandowski 38', 55'; Douglas Costa 41'; Alaba (yellow card) 56'	Report	Rebić (yellow card) 23'; Mascarell (yellow card) 36'; Hasebe (yellow card) 45+2'	Stadium: Allianz Arena; Attendance: 75,000; Referee: Markus Schmidt

18 March 2017 25	Eintracht Frankfurt	0–0	Hamburger SV	Frankfurt
18:30 CET (UTC+1)	Mascarell (yellow card) 83'	Report	Jung (yellow card) 68'	Stadium: Commerzbank-Arena; Attendance: 51,500; Referee: Benjamin Cortus

1 April 2017 26	Eintracht Frankfurt	0–0	Borussia Mönchengladbach	Frankfurt
18:30 CEST (UTC+2)	Vallejo (yellow card) 21'; Mascarell (yellow card) 43'; Chandler (yellow card) 83'; Hrgota (yellow card) 89'	Report	Strobl (yellow card) 56' (yellow-red card) 85'; Sippel (yellow card) 77'; Wendt (yellow card) 78'	Stadium: Commerzbank-Arena; Attendance: 51,500; Referee: Harm Osmers
Note: Tobias Sippel was booked on the substitutes' bench, despite not playing any part in the match.

4 April 2017 27	1. FC Köln	1–0	Eintracht Frankfurt	Cologne
20:00 CEST (UTC+2)	Jojić 53'	Report	Wolf (yellow card) 74'; Gaćinović (yellow card) 90+4'	Stadium: RheinEnergieSTADION; Attendance: 49,300; Referee: Wolfgang Stark

7 April 2017 28	Eintracht Frankfurt	2–2	Werder Bremen	Frankfurt
20:30 CEST (UTC+2)	Gaćinović 48'; Rebić (yellow card) 53'; Fabián 73' (pen.), (yellow card) 74'	Report	Veljković (yellow card) 7'; Junuzović 37'; Bartels 43', (yellow card) 69'	Stadium: Commerzbank-Arena; Attendance: 51,000; Referee: Bastian Dankert

15 April 2017 29	Borussia Dortmund	3–1	Eintracht Frankfurt	Dortmund
15:30 CEST (UTC+2)	Reus 2'; Papastathopoulos 34'; Aubameyang 86'	Report	Fabián 29'	Stadium: SIGNAL IDUNA PARK; Attendance: 81,360; Referee: Robert Hartmann

22 April 2017 30	Eintracht Frankfurt	3–1	FC Augsburg	Frankfurt
15:30 CEST (UTC+2)	Rebić (yellow card) 55', (goal) 90+1'; Fabián 78', 87'; Abraham (yellow card) 88'	Report	Gouweleeuw 9'; Hitz (yellow card) 56'	Stadium: Commerzbank-Arena; Attendance: 50,200; Referee: Felix Zwayer

30 April 2017 31	1899 Hoffenheim	1–0	Eintracht Frankfurt	Sinsheim
17:30 CEST (UTC+2)	Hübner 90'	Report	Abraham (yellow card) 55'; Russ (yellow card) 75'; Fabián (yellow card) 90+2'	Stadium: WIRSOL Rhein-Neckar-Arena; Attendance: 30,150; Referee: Günter Perl

6 May 2017 32	Eintracht Frankfurt	0–2	VfL Wolfsburg	Frankfurt
15:30 CEST (UTC+2)	Gaćinović (yellow card) 27'	Report	Didavi 48'; Gerhardt (yellow card) 59'; Gómez 63'; Casteels (yellow card) 73'	Stadium: Commerzbank-Arena; Attendance: 49,000; Referee: Manuel Gräfe

13 May 2017 33	Mainz 05	4–2	Eintracht Frankfurt	Mainz
15:30 CEST (UTC+2)	Córdoba 60'; Bell 62', (yellow card) 72'; Muto 76', (yellow card) 77'; Bojan (yellow card) 89'; de Blasis 90+3' (pen.), (yellow card) 90+4'	Report	Chandler (yellow card) 12'; Hrgota 42'; Seferovic 50'; Fabián (yellow card) 53'; Rebić (yellow card) 84'; Besuschkow (yellow card) 90'	Stadium: OPEL ARENA; Attendance: 34,000; Referee: Marco Fritz

20 May 2017 34	Eintracht Frankfurt	2–2	RB Leipzig	Frankfurt
15:30 CEST (UTC+2)	Fabián (yellow card) 37'; Vallejo 83'; Blum 90'	Report	Sabitzer 25'; Poulsen 56'; Kaiser (yellow card) 75'; Selke (yellow card) 89'	Stadium: Waldstadion; Attendance: 51,000; Referee: Felix Brych

=== DFB-Pokal ===
21 August 2016 First round	1. FC Magdeburg	1–1 (a.e.t.) (3–4 p)	Eintracht Frankfurt	Magdeburg
15:30 CEST (UTC+2)	Brandt (yellow card) 22'; Hammann 75'; Löhmannsröben (yellow card) 113'	Report	Hrgota 7'; Mascarell (yellow card) 42'; Hasebe (yellow card) 58'; Hector (yellow card) 74' (yellow-red card) 100'	Stadium: MDCC-Arena; Attendance: 24,400; Referee: Markus Schmidt
	Penalties
	Hammann (penalty scored); Puttkammer (penalty missed); Müller (penalty missed); Exslager (penalty scored); Beck (penalty scored); Löhmannsröben (penalty missed)		(penalty scored) Meier; (penalty scored) Huszti; (penalty missed) Hasebe; (penalty missed) Mascarell; (penalty scored) Blum; (penalty scored) Varela

25 October 2016 Second round	Eintracht Frankfurt	0–0 (a.e.t.) (4–1 p)	FC Ingolstadt	Frankfurt
20:45 CEST (UTC+2)	Gaćinović (yellow card) 29'; Fabián (yellow card) 79' (yellow-red card) 88'	Report	Lex (yellow card) 48'; Leckie (yellow card) 76'; Groß (yellow card) 101'	Stadium: Commerzbank-Arena; Attendance: 6,300; Referee: Harm Osmers
	Penalties
	Huszti (penalty scored); Oczipka (penalty scored); Mascarell (penalty scored); Hasebe (penalty scored)		(penalty scored) Cohen; (penalty missed) Christiansen; (penalty missed) Hartmann

8 February 2017 Round of 16	Hannover 96	1–2	Eintracht Frankfurt	Hanover
20:45 CET (UTC+1)	Harnik 57'; Bakalorz (yellow card) 67'; Füllkrug (yellow card) 90+1'	Report	Tawatha 62'; Seferovic 66'; Mascarell (yellow card) 90+1'	Stadium: HDI-Arena; Attendance: 31,000; Referee: Robert Kampka

28 February 2017 Quarter-finals	Eintracht Frankfurt	1–0	Arminia Bielefeld	Frankfurt
18:30 CET (UTC+1)	Blum 6'; Varela (yellow card) 81'	Report	Schuppan (yellow card) 76'; Behrendt (yellow card) 82'	Stadium: Commerzbank-Arena; Attendance: 39,000; Referee: Felix Zwayer

25 April 2017 Semi-finals	Borussia Mönchengladbach	1–1 (a.e.t.) (6–7 p)	Eintracht Frankfurt	Mönchengladbach
20:45 CEST (UTC+2)	Wendt (yellow card) 24'; Hofmann 45+2'; N. Schulz (yellow card) 90'; Hahn (yellow card) 90+3'	Report	Tawatha 15'; Fabián (yellow card) 60'; Varela (yellow card) 80'	Stadium: BORUSSIA-PARK; Attendance: 54,014; Referee: Deniz Aytekin
	Penalties
	Stindl (penalty scored); Herrmann (penalty scored); Hahn (penalty scored); Strobl (penalty scored); Bénes (penalty scored); Vestergaard (penalty scored); Christensen (penalty missed); Sow (penalty missed)		(penalty scored) Oczipka; (penalty scored) Hector; (penalty scored) Gaćinović; (penalty scored) Fabián; (penalty scored) Russ; (penalty scored) Seferovic; (penalty missed) Varela; (penalty scored) Hrgota

27 May 2017 Final	Eintracht Frankfurt	1–2	Borussia Dortmund	Berlin
20:00 CEST (UTC+2)	Rebić 29', (yellow card) 87'; Gaćinović (yellow card) 38'; Hrádecký (yellow card) 66'; Abraham (yellow card) 69'	Report	Dembélé 8', (yellow card) 90+4'; Aubameyang 67' (pen.)	Stadium: Olympiastadion Berlin; Attendance: 74,322; Referee: Deniz Aytekin

== Statistics ==
=== Appearances and goals ===
No.	Pos	Nat	Player	Total		Bundesliga		DFB-Pokal	
No.	Pos	Nat	Player	Apps	Goals	Apps	Goals	Apps	Goals
Goalkeepers
1	GK	(Finland) FIN	Lukáš Hrádecký	39	0	33	0	6	0
13	GK	(Austria) AUT	Heinz Lindner	2	0	1+1	0	0	0
34	GK	(Germany) GER	Leon Bätge	0	0	0	0	0	0
Defenders
2	DF	(Germany) GER	Yanni Regäsel	1	0	0	0	1	0
3	DF	(Uruguay) URU	Guillermo Varela	10	0	6+1	0	1+2	0
4	DF	(Germany) GER	Marco Russ	6	0	3+1	0	0+2	0
5	DF	(Spain) ESP	Jesús Vallejo	27	1	22+3	1	2	0
6	DF	(Germany) GER	Bastian Oczipka	38	1	33	1	4+1	0
15	DF	(Jamaica) JAM	Michael Hector	27	1	14+8	1	5	0
19	DF	(Argentina) ARG	David Abraham	36	1	30	1	6	0
22	DF	(United States) USA	Timothy Chandler	38	0	31+1	0	4+2	0
23	DF	(Brazil) BRA	Anderson Bamba	0	0	0	0	0	0
29	DF	(Ecuador) ECU	Anderson Ordóñez	4	0	3+1	0	0	0
33	DF	(Israel) ISR	Taleb Tawatha	19	2	8+6	0	3+2	2
36	DF	(Germany) GER	Furkan Zorba	0	0	0	0	0	0
Midfielders
10	MF	(Mexico) MEX	Marco Fabián	27	7	23+1	7	2+1	0
11	MF	(Serbia) SRB	Mijat Gaćinović	34	2	26+2	2	5+1	0
18	MF	(Germany) GER	Max Besuschkow	4	0	1+2	0	1	0
20	MF	(Japan) JPN	Makoto Hasebe	25	1	21+1	1	2+1	0
21	MF	(Germany) GER	Marc Stendera	2	0	2	0	0	0
25	MF	(Serbia) SRB	Slobodan Medojević	1	0	0	0	1	0
28	MF	(Germany) GER	Aymen Barkok	19	2	6+12	2	1	0
39	MF	(Spain) ESP	Omar Mascarell	33	0	27+1	0	5	0
Forwards
7	FW	(Germany) GER	Danny Blum	18	2	3+11	1	1+3	1
9	FW	(Switzerland) SUI	Haris Seferovic	29	4	12+13	3	3+1	1
14	FW	(Germany) GER	Alexander Meier	25	5	15+6	5	3+1	0
17	FW	(Croatia) CRO	Ante Rebić	28	3	16+8	2	4	1
24	FW	(Germany) GER	Marius Wolf	4	0	2+1	0	0+1	0
30	FW	(Switzerland) SUI	Shani Tarashaj	15	1	1+12	1	1+1	0
31	FW	(Sweden) SWE	Branimir Hrgota	30	6	22+6	5	2	1
Players transferred out during the season
8	MF	(Hungary) HUN	Szabolcs Huszti	17	2	14+1	2	2	0
18	MF	(Germany) GER	Johannes Flum	0	0	0	0	0	0
30	FW	(Netherlands) NED	Luc Castaignos	1	0	0	0	1	0
32	MF	(Germany) GER	Joel Gerezgiher	0	0	0	0	0	0
38	FW	(Germany) GER	Enis Bunjaki	0	0	0	0	0	0

Last updated: 27 May 2017
Source: Competitions

=== Goalscorers ===
Rank	No.	Pos	Nat	Name	Bundesliga	DFB-Pokal	Total
1	10	MF	(Mexico)	Marco Fabián	7	0	7
2	31	FW	(Sweden)	Branimir Hrgota	5	1	6
3	14	FW	(Germany)	Alexander Meier	5	0	5
4	9	FW	(Switzerland)	Haris Seferovic	3	1	4
5	17	FW	(Croatia)	Ante Rebić	2	1	3
6	7	FW	(Germany)	Danny Blum	1	1	2
6	8	MF	(Hungary)	Szabolcs Huszti	2	0	2
6	11	MF	(Serbia)	Mijat Gaćinović	2	0	2
6	28	MF	(Germany)	Aymen Barkok	2	0	2
6	33	DF	(Israel)	Taleb Tawatha	0	2	2
11	5	DF	(Spain)	Jesús Vallejo	1	0	1
11	6	DF	(Germany)	Bastian Oczipka	1	0	1
11	15	DF	(Jamaica)	Michael Hector	1	0	1
11	19	DF	(Argentina)	David Abraham	1	0	1
11	20	MF	(Japan)	Makoto Hasebe	1	0	1
11	30	FW	(Switzerland)	Shani Tarashaj	1	0	1
Own goal					1	0	1
Totals					34	6	40

Last updated: 27 May 2017

=== Clean sheets ===
Rank	No.	Pos	Nat	Name	Bundesliga	DFB-Pokal	Total
1	1	GK	(Finland)	Lukáš Hrádecký	10	3	13
2	13	GK	(Austria)	Heinz Lindner	1	0	1
Totals					11	3	14

Last updated: 1 April 2017

=== Disciplinary record ===
No.	Pos	Nat	Player	Bundesliga			DFB-Pokal			Total		
No.	Pos	Nat	Player	Booked	(yellow card) (yellow-red card)	Sent off (straight red)	Booked	(yellow card) (yellow-red card)	Sent off (straight red)	Booked	(yellow card) (yellow-red card)	Sent off (straight red)
1	GK	(Finland)	Lukáš Hrádecký	2	0	1	1	0	0	3	0	1
3	DF	(Uruguay)	Guillermo Varela	1	0	0	2	0	0	3	0	0
4	DF	(Germany)	Marco Russ	1	0	0	0	0	0	1	0	0
5	DF	(Spain)	Jesús Vallejo	4	0	0	0	0	0	4	0	0
6	DF	(Germany)	Bastian Oczipka	5	0	0	0	0	0	5	0	0
8	MF	(Hungary)	Szabolcs Huszti	3	1	0	0	0	0	3	1	0
9	FW	(Switzerland)	Haris Seferovic	1	0	1	0	0	0	1	0	1
10	MF	(Mexico)	Marco Fabián	10	0	0	1	1	0	11	1	0
11	MF	(Serbia)	Mijat Gaćinović	9	0	0	2	0	0	11	0	0
14	FW	(Germany)	Alexander Meier	1	0	0	0	0	0	1	0	0
15	DF	(Jamaica)	Michael Hector	4	0	1	0	1	0	4	1	1
17	FW	(Croatia)	Ante Rebić	10	0	0	1	0	0	11	0	0
18	MF	(Germany)	Max Besuschkow	1	0	0	0	0	0	1	0	0
19	DF	(Argentina)	David Abraham	5	0	1	1	0	0	6	0	1
20	MF	(Japan)	Makoto Hasebe	2	0	0	1	0	0	3	0	0
22	DF	(United States)	Timothy Chandler	7	0	1	0	0	0	7	0	1
24	FW	(Germany)	Marius Wolf	1	0	0	0	0	0	1	0	0
28	MF	(Germany)	Aymen Barkok	1	0	0	0	0	0	1	0	0
30	FW	(Switzerland)	Shani Tarashaj	1	0	0	0	0	0	1	0	0
31	FW	(Sweden)	Branimir Hrgota	2	0	0	0	0	0	2	0	0
39	MF	(Spain)	Omar Mascarell	13	0	0	2	0	0	15	0	0
Totals				84	1	5	11	2	0	95	3	5

Last updated: 27 May 2017
