= 2017 DFB-Pokal final =

- Match programme cover
- Event: 2016–17 DFB-Pokal
Eintracht Frankfurt	Borussia Dortmund
1	2
- Date: 27 May 2017
- Venue: Olympiastadion, Berlin
- Man of the Match: Ousmane Dembélé (Borussia Dortmund)
- Referee: Deniz Aytekin (Oberasbach)
- Attendance: 74,322
- Weather: Clear; 25 °C (77 °F); 34% humidity

The 2017 DFB-Pokal final decided the winner of the 2016–17 DFB-Pokal, the 74th season of the annual German football cup competition. The match was played on 27 May 2017 at the Olympiastadion in Berlin.

Eintracht Frankfurt, in their first final since 2006, faced Borussia Dortmund, the runners-up in the previous three finals. Borussia Dortmund won the match 2–1 to claim their fourth cup title.

As winners, Borussia Dortmund hosted the 2017 edition of the DFL-Supercup at the start of the next season, and faced the champions of the 2016–17 edition of the Bundesliga, Bayern Munich. The winners of the DFB-Pokal were also to earn automatic qualification for the group stage of the 2017–18 edition of the UEFA Europa League, but since Borussia Dortmund had already qualified for the 2017–18 edition of the UEFA Champions League through their position in the Bundesliga, the group stage spot went to the team in sixth, Hertha BSC, and the league's third qualifying round spot to the team in seventh, SC Freiburg.

== Route to the final ==
The DFB-Pokal began with 64 teams in a single-elimination knockout cup competition. There were a total of five rounds leading up to the final. Teams were drawn against each other, and the winner after 90 minutes advanced. If still tied, 30 minutes of extra time were played. If the score was still level, a penalty shoot-out was used to determine the winner.

Note: In all results below, the score of the finalist is given first (H: home; A: away).

Eintracht Frankfurt		Round	Borussia Dortmund	
Opponent	Result	2016–17 DFB-Pokal	Opponent	Result
1. FC Magdeburg (A)	1–1 (a.e.t.) (4–3 p)	First round	Eintracht Trier (A)	3–0
FC Ingolstadt (H)	0–0 (a.e.t.) (4–1 p)	Second round	Union Berlin (H)	1–1 (a.e.t.) (3–0 p)
Hannover 96 (A)	2–1	Round of 16	Hertha BSC (H)	1–1 (a.e.t.) (3–2 p)
Arminia Bielefeld (H)	1–0	Quarter-finals	Sportfreunde Lotte (A)	3–0
Borussia Mönchengladbach (A)	1–1 (a.e.t.) (7–6 p)	Semi-finals	Bayern Munich (A)	3–2

== Pre-match ==
=== Officials ===
On 28 April 2017, the German Football Association announced that Deniz Aytekin would officiate the match, joined by his assistants Christian Dietz and Eduard Beitinger. Benjamin Brand was chosen as the fourth official. Aytekin had officiated on the DFB level since 2004, and in the Bundesliga since 2008. He was a FIFA listed referee since 2011, and was ranked as a UEFA Elite group referee.

=== Ticketing ===
With a stadium capacity of nearly 74,500, the two finalist teams received 21,000 tickets each. The remaining tickets available to the general public were available for sale via the DFB ticket portal from 2 to 16 March 2017 in four price categories: €130, €95, €70, and €45. A computer-generated draw determined the ticket allocation.

=== Seating ===
On 28 April 2017, the finalists met in Berlin with the DFB to set out the framework for the final. Eintracht Frankfurt were allocated the guest dressing room, with the Frankfurt fans in the Ostkurve of the stadium. The Alexanderplatz was connected to the Ostkurve for the "Fanfest". Borussia Dortmund got the home dressing room, and the Dortmund fans located at the Marathontor. The Breitscheidplatz was connected to the Marathontor for the "Fanfest".

=== Trophy ===
For the first time, the DFB, in partner with ERGO Group, hosted the "DFB-Pokal-Tour" of the competition trophy from 21 April to 4 May 2017. The trophy visited nine cities, with visitors getting to experience the history of the trophy. The tour also included the women's competition trophy on display while in Cologne, the venue for the women's final. Due to the positive response, the trophy also made two additional stops in Berlin in the days before the final.

On 5 May 2017, Berlin mayor Michael Müller received the trophy at the traditional "Cup Handover" at the Wappensaal of the Rotes Rathaus in Berlin. The trophy remained on display at the city hall until the final. DFB president Reinhard Grindel, DFB vice-president Peter Frymuth, and Berlin senator Andreas Geisel all attended the event. Hasan Salihamidžić symbolically gave the trophy to Grindel, on behalf of the current titleholders, Bayern Munich. The two finalists were represented at the event by Fredi Bobic and Alexander Meier for Eintracht Frankfurt, as well as CEO Hans-Joachim Watzke and Nuri Şahin for Borussia Dortmund.

At the "Cup Handover", the DFB announced that retired German figure skater and East German Olympic gold medalist Katarina Witt would be the trophy bearer for the final.

=== Kits ===
On 28 April 2017, Eintracht Frankfurt announced a special kit featuring the club's traditional colours would be worn for the final. The kit was unveiled on 8 May, featuring a white shirt with a black collar, a black stripe running along the top of the sleeve and upper back, and black sleeve cuffs. Eintracht Frankfurt's four previous cup-winning years were printed on the back of the collar. The kit also featured black shorts and white socks in addition to the white kit.

On 18 May, Borussia Dortmund unveiled their new home kit for the 2017–18 season, which was also worn during the DFB-Pokal final. The kit featured a gradient hoop pattern on the front, with the back and sleeves monochrome. This was accompanied by yellow shorts, and yellow and black socks.

=== Half-time performance ===
On 23 May, it was announced that German singer Helene Fischer would perform a specially made melody during the half-time interval of the DFB-Pokal final.

=== Related events ===
On 24 and 25 May, the finals of the 2016–17 Verbandspokal took place, determining the regional teams which would enter next season's edition of the DFB-Pokal. The 2017 DFB-Pokal der Frauen final was held on 27 May at the RheinEnergieStadion in Cologne. The 2017 DFB-Junioren-Vereinspokal final was also held on 27 May at the Stadion auf dem Wurfplatz in Berlin.

== Match ==
=== Summary ===
Ousmane Dembélé opened the scoring for Borussia Dortmund in the 8th minute when he cut in past defender Jesús Vallejo on the right to fire left footed high into the net. Ante Rebić equalised in the 29th minute for Eintracht Frankfurt with a low shot to the right of the goalkeeper from ten yards out after receiving the ball out on the left from Mijat Gaćinović.

Borussia Dortmund were awarded a penalty in the 67th minute when goalkeeper Lukáš Hrádecký tripped Christian Pulisic. Pierre-Emerick Aubameyang scored from the penalty, chipping the ball to the center of the goal with his right foot.

=== Details ===
27 May 2017
20:00 CEST

Eintracht Frankfurt	1–2	Borussia Dortmund
Rebić 29'	Report	Dembélé 8'; Aubameyang 67' (pen.)

Olympiastadion, Berlin
Attendance: 74,322
Referee: Deniz Aytekin (Oberasbach)

Eintracht Frankfurt	Borussia Dortmund

GK	1	(Finland) Lukáš Hrádecký	(yellow card) 66'
CB	15	(Jamaica) Michael Hector
CB	19	(Argentina) David Abraham	(yellow card) 69'
CB	5	(Spain) Jesús Vallejo
RM	22	(United States) Timothy Chandler (c)		(substituted off) 72'
CM	25	(Serbia) Slobodan Medojević		(substituted off) 56'
CM	11	(Serbia) Mijat Gaćinović	(yellow card) 38'
LM	6	(Germany) Bastian Oczipka
RW	10	(Mexico) Marco Fabián		(substituted off) 79'
LW	17	(Croatia) Ante Rebić	(yellow card) 87'
CF	9	(Switzerland) Haris Seferovic
Substitutes:
GK	13	(Austria) Heinz Lindner
DF	4	(Germany) Marco Russ
DF	33	(Israel) Taleb Tawatha		(substituted on) 56'
MF	28	(Germany) Aymen Barkok
FW	7	(Germany) Danny Blum		(substituted on) 79'
FW	14	(Germany) Alexander Meier		(substituted on) 72'
FW	31	(Sweden) Branimir Hrgota
Manager:
(Croatia) Niko Kovač

GK	38	(Switzerland) Roman Bürki
CB	5	(Spain) Marc Bartra		(substituted off) 76'
CB	25	(Greece) Sokratis Papastathopoulos
CB	29	(Germany) Marcel Schmelzer (c)		(substituted off) 46'
DM	28	(Germany) Matthias Ginter
RM	26	(Poland) Łukasz Piszczek
CM	7	(France) Ousmane Dembélé	(yellow card) 90+4'
CM	23	(Japan) Shinji Kagawa
LM	13	(Portugal) Raphaël Guerreiro
CF	17	(Gabon) Pierre-Emerick Aubameyang
CF	11	(Germany) Marco Reus		(substituted off) 46'
Substitutes:
GK	1	(Germany) Roman Weidenfeller
DF	6	(Germany) Sven Bender
DF	37	(Germany) Erik Durm		(substituted on) 76'
MF	18	(Germany) Sebastian Rode
MF	21	(Germany) André Schürrle
MF	22	(United States) Christian Pulisic		(substituted on) 46'
MF	27	(Germany) Gonzalo Castro		(substituted on) 46'
Manager:
(Germany) Thomas Tuchel

Man of the Match:
Ousmane Dembélé (Borussia Dortmund)

Assistant referees:
Christian Dietz (Munich)
Eduard Beitinger (Regensburg)
Fourth official:
Benjamin Brand (Unterspiesheim)

Match rules

- 90 minutes.
- 30 minutes of extra time if necessary.
- Penalty shoot-out if scores still level.
- Seven named substitutes.
- Maximum of three substitutions, with a fourth allowed in extra time.

=== Statistics ===
Statistic	Eintracht Frankfurt	Borussia Dortmund
Goals scored	1	2
Total shots	8	12
Shots on target	4	6
Saves	4	3
Ball possession	46%	54%
Corner kicks	4	5
Fouls committed	17	8
Offsides	5	5
Yellow cards	4	1
Red cards	0	0

== See also ==
- 2017 DFL-Supercup
- Football in Berlin
