= Omar Mascarell =

Equatoguinean footballer (born 1993)

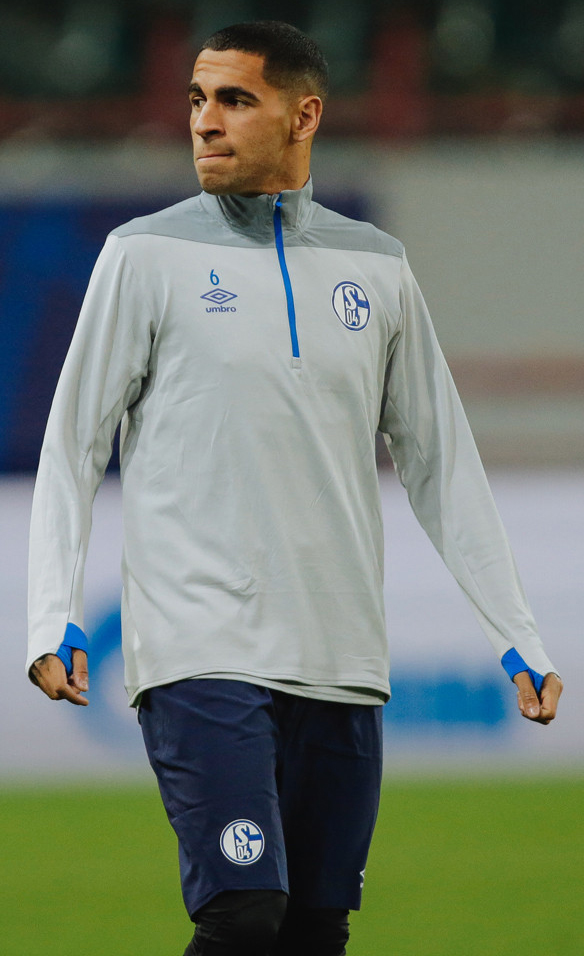
- Mascarell with Schalke 04 in 2018

Personal information
- Full name: Omar Mascarell González
- Date of birth: 2 February 1993 (age 33)
- Place of birth: Santa Cruz de Tenerife, Spain
- Height: 1.81 m (5 ft 11 in)
- Position: Defensive midfielder

Team information
- Current team: Al-Khaleej

Youth career
- 1998–2000: Santa Cruz
- 2000–2007: Tegueste
- 2007–2010: Laguna
- 2010–2011: Real Madrid

Senior career*
Years	Team	Apps	(Gls)
2011–2014	Real Madrid B	76	(8)
2012–2013	Real Madrid C	21	(2)
2013–2016	Real Madrid	1	(0)
2014–2015	→ Derby County (loan)	23	(0)
2015–2016	→ Sporting Gijón (loan)	26	(0)
2016–2018	Eintracht Frankfurt	37	(1)
2018–2021	Schalke 04	61	(1)
2020	Schalke 04 II	1	(0)
2021–2023	Elche	60	(0)
2023–2026	Mallorca	91	(2)
2026–	Al-Khaleej	10	(2)

International career^{‡}
2010	Canary Islands U18	1	(0)
2011	Spain U18	1	(0)
2013	Spain U20	1	(0)
2024–	Equatorial Guinea	14	(0)
- * Club domestic league appearances and goals as of 22:33, 18 October 2026 (UTC) ‡ National team caps and goals as of 18:07, 31 December 2025 (UTC)

Omar Mascarell González (born 2 February 1993) is a professional footballer who plays as a defensive midfielder for Saudi Pro League club Al-Khaleej.

Developed at Real Madrid, where he made one first-team appearance, he also played in La Liga for Sporting de Gijón, Elche and Mallorca. He also totalled 98 Bundesliga games for Eintracht Frankfurt and Schalke 04, and won the DFB-Pokal with the former in 2018.

Born in Spain, Mascarell plays for the Equatorial Guinea national team, having made his debut in 2024.

== Club career ==
=== Real Madrid ===
Born in Santa Cruz de Tenerife, Canary Islands, Mascarell joined Real Madrid's youth system at the age of 17, arriving from local club Laguna. On 21 August 2011 he made his debut as a senior, playing with Real Madrid Castilla against Sporting de Gijón B in the Segunda División B. He contributed 24 games during the season (11 starts) as the B's returned to Segunda División after an absence of five years, scoring twice in the process.

Mascarell started the 2012–13 campaign with the C team also in the third division, but was promoted back to the reserves after only a couple of weeks. He played his first professional match on 28 October 2012, coming on as a substitute for Pedro Mosquera for the last 17 minutes of a 2–4 home loss to Sporting de Gijón.

Mascarell made his La Liga debut with the Merengues on 1 June 2013, replacing Mesut Özil late into a 4–2 home win against Osasuna in what was the last matchday. On 6 August of the following year, he joined English Championship club Derby County on a season-long loan. He made his debut for the latter five days later, substituting Will Hughes in the 53rd minute of a 1–0 victory over Rotherham United at Pride Park Stadium.

On 3 August 2015, Mascarell moved to Sporting Gijón on loan for the season. He played 28 matches in all competitions, starting 20 in the league and helping the Asturians finally retain their top-flight status.

=== Eintracht Frankfurt ===
On 6 July 2016, Mascarell signed with Eintracht Frankfurt on a three-year contract. His maiden appearance in the Bundesliga took place on 27 August, when he played the full 90 minutes in a 1–0 home defeat of Schalke 04.

Mascarell spent the better part of the 2017–18 season on the sidelines, due to an achilles tendon injury. On 5 May he scored his first goal league goal in a 3–0 win over relegation-threatened Hamburger SV at the Waldstadion. He played the entire final of the DFB-Pokal two weeks later, helping to a 3–1 victory against league champions Bayern Munich; he had opened his account for the club in the quarter-finals by concluding a 3–0 win at home to Mainz 05.

=== Schalke 04 ===
On 29 June 2018, Mascarell's buy back clause was activated by Real Madrid for €4 million. He was subsequently sold to Schalke 04 also in the German top division for €10 million, signing a four-year contract. From February to September 2020, he was sidelined with an abductor muscle injury, returning for the reserve team's 2–0 Regionalliga home win against SV Rödinghausen.

For 2019–20, Mascarell was appointed vice-captain. After Alexander Nübel decided to leave the club at the end of the season, he was selected by head coach David Wagner as his successor; however, he was stripped of the armband on 30 January 2021 and replaced by Sead Kolašinac. His one goal in 71 appearances for them was on the same day, opening a 1–1 draw at Werder Bremen.

=== Elche ===
On 23 August 2021, free agent Mascarell returned to his home country after agreeing to a one-year deal with Elche in the top tier. He totalled 62 games during his spell at the Estadio Martínez Valero, suffering relegation in 2022–23.

=== Mallorca ===
On 27 June 2023, Mascarell joined Mallorca on a three-year contract. He scored his first goal in the main division on 10 May 2025, equalising an eventual 2–1 home defeat of bottom-placed Real Valladolid; he needed 145 matches to achieve this.

=== Al-Khaleej ===
On 24 June 2026, after Mallorca's relegation, Mascarell moved to Saudi Pro League side Al-Khaleej.

== International career ==
=== Spain ===
Mascarell is of Equatoguinean descent through his Bubi great-grandmother, while his paternal grandfather was born in the country. He won caps for Spain at under-18 and under-20 levels, also featuring once for the Canary Islands under-18 side.

=== Equatorial Guinea ===
In May 2012, Mascarell was called by Equatorial Guinea for the 2014 FIFA World Cup qualifiers against Tunisia and Sierra Leone. He travelled to Malabo, but nonetheless declined to play in any of the two matches because he had already appeared for Spain at youth level and did not want to give up on that option; according to the local press, the Equatoguinean Football Federation was completing the administrative procedures of his eligibility.

In December 2023, Mascarell was pre-selected for the 2023 Africa Cup of Nations; he did not make the final cut, however. He made his debut on 5 June 2024, in a 1–0 loss away to Tunisia for the 2026 World Cup qualifying phase.

== Career statistics ==
=== Club ===
As of match played 23 May 2026

Appearances and goals by club, season and competition
Club	Season	League			Cup		Europe		Other		Total	
Club	Season	Division	Apps	Goals	Apps	Goals	Apps	Goals	Apps	Goals	Apps	Goals
Real Madrid B	2011–12	Segunda División B	24	2	—		—		—		24	2
Real Madrid B	2012–13	Segunda División	14	0	—		—		—		14	0
Real Madrid B	2013–14	Segunda División	38	6	—		—		—		38	6
Real Madrid B	Total		76	8	0	0	0	0	0	0	76	8
Real Madrid	2012–13	La Liga	1	0	0	0	0	0	0	0	1	0
Real Madrid	2013–14	La Liga	0	0	0	0	0	0	0	0	0	0
Real Madrid	Total		1	0	0	0	0	0	0	0	1	0
Derby County (loan)	2014–15	Championship	23	0	7	0	—		—		30	0
Sporting Gijón (loan)	2015–16	La Liga	26	0	2	0	—		—		28	0
Eintracht Frankfurt	2016–17	Bundesliga	28	0	5	0	—		—		33	0
Eintracht Frankfurt	2017–18	Bundesliga	9	1	3	1	—		—		12	2
Eintracht Frankfurt	Total		37	1	8	1	0	0	—		45	2
Schalke 04	2018–19	Bundesliga	14	0	2	0	3 (Note: Appearances in UEFA Champions League)	0	—		19	0
Schalke 04	2019–20	Bundesliga	23	0	3	0	—		—		26	0
Schalke 04	2020–21	Bundesliga	24	1	2	0	—		—		26	1
Schalke 04	Total		61	1	7	0	3	0	—		71	1
Elche	2021–22	La Liga	32	0	0	0	—		—		32	0
Elche	2022–23	La Liga	28	0	2	0	—		—		30	0
Elche	Total		60	0	2	0	0	0	—		62	0
Mallorca	2023–24	La Liga	29	0	5	0	—		—		34	0
Mallorca	2024–25	La Liga	32	1	1	0	—		1 (Note: Appearance in Supercopa de España)	0	34	1
Mallorca	2025–26	La Liga	30	1	2	0	—		—		32	1
Mallorca	Total		91	2	8	0	—		1	0	100	2
Career total			375	12	34	1	3	0	1	0	413	13

=== International ===
As of match played 31 December 2025

Appearances and goals by national team and year
National team	Year	Apps	Goals
Equatorial Guinea	2024	6	0
Equatorial Guinea	2025	8	0
Total		14	0

== Honours ==
Eintracht Frankfurt

- DFB-Pokal: 2017–18
