= Mijat Gaćinović =

Serbian footballer (born 1995)

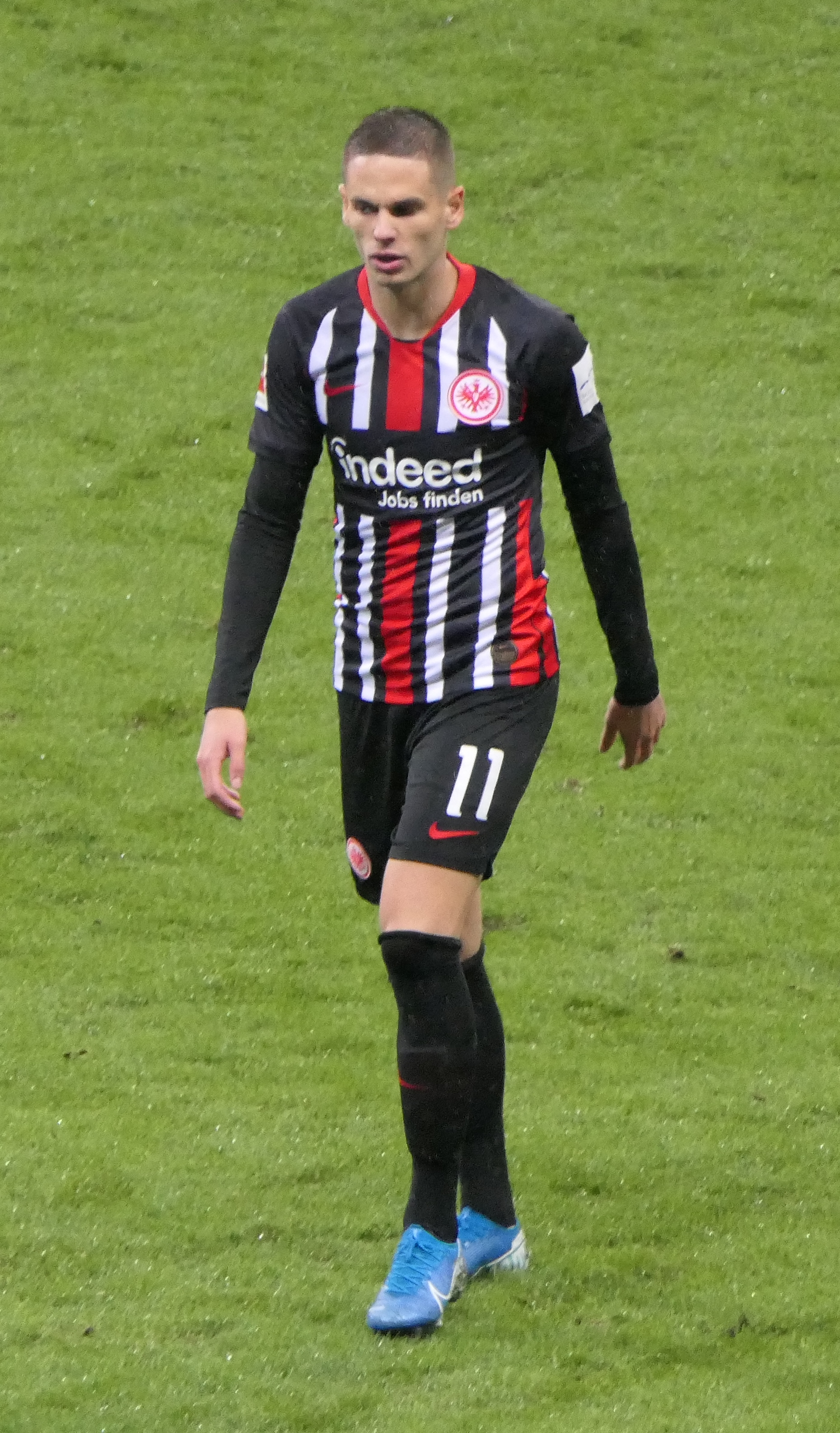
- Gaćinović with Eintracht Frankfurt in 2019

Personal information
- Full name: Mijat Gaćinović
- Date of birth: 8 February 1995 (age 31)
- Place of birth: Novi Sad, FR Yugoslavia
- Height: 1.75 m (5 ft 9 in)
- Positions: Midfielder; winger

Team information
- Current team: AEK Athens
- Number: 8

Youth career
- Leotar
- Vojvodina

Senior career*
Years	Team	Apps	(Gls)
2013–2015	Vojvodina	50	(12)
2015–2020	Eintracht Frankfurt	117	(4)
2020–2022	TSG Hoffenheim	27	(0)
2022	→ Panathinaikos (loan)	13	(0)
2022–	AEK Athens	96	(14)

International career^{‡}
2011	Bosnia and Herzegovina U17	3	(1)
2013–2014	Serbia U19	11	(2)
2014–2015	Serbia U20	10	(0)
2015–2017	Serbia U21	12	(3)
2017–	Serbia	30	(2)
Medal record
Men's Football
Representing Serbia
FIFA U-20 World Cup
Gold medal – first place	2015 New Zealand	U-20 Team
UEFA U-19 Championship
Gold medal – first place	2013 Lithuania
- * Club domestic league appearances and goals as of 20 September 2026 ‡ National team caps and goals as of 31 March 2026

Mijat Gaćinović (Serbian Cyrillic: Мијат Гаћиновић, pronounced [mîjaːt ɡatɕǐːnoʋitɕ]; born 8 February 1995) is a Serbian professional footballer who plays as a midfielder for Greek Super League club AEK Athens and the Serbia national team.

== Club career ==
=== Vojvodina ===
Gaćinović was born in Novi Sad while his father Vladimir played for FK Bečej. His family is from Trebinje in Bosnia and Herzegovina, where Gaćinović returned when his father finished his career. He started to play football at Leotar, before joining the youth academy of Vojvodina. He made his first team debut under manager Nebojša Vignjević on 19 March 2013, coming off the bench as a substitute for Miroslav Vulićević in a 3–0 home win over Donji Srem. On 18 May 2013, Gaćinović scored his first senior goal in a 3–2 home league victory over Radnički Niš.

After already establishing his place in the starting lineup, Gaćinović helped Vojvodina win the 2013–14 Serbian Cup in the club's centennial year. He was named the team's captain in early 2015, eventually becoming their top league scorer in the 2014–15 season, netting 11 goals.

=== Eintracht Frankfurt ===
In the summer of 2015, Gaćinović moved to Germany and signed with Eintracht Frankfurt. He made his official debut for the club on 28 November 2015, playing the full 90 minutes in a 1–2 away league loss against Mainz 05. On 19 May 2016, Gaćinović scored the equalizer in the first leg of the 2015–16 Bundesliga relegation playoffs against Nürnberg, before assisting the only goal in the return leg away to keep his club in the top flight.

=== TSG Hoffenheim ===
On 4 August 2020, Gaćinović signed for TSG Hoffenheim as part of a swap deal, with Steven Zuber going to Frankfurt. He put pen to paper on a 4-year contract.

==== Loan to Panathinaikos ====
On 31 January 2022, in the last day of winter transfer window, Panathinaikos completed the loan signing of Gaćinović, until the summer of 2022.

=== AEK Athens ===
On 28 June 2022, Gaćinović signed a 4-year contract with AEK Athens. The Greek club paid an estimated fee of €1,000,000, while TSG Hoffenheim will keep a resale rate of 30%.

In the first half of the 2022–23 season, Gaćinović emerged as a leading figure in Matías Almeyda's plans, scoring 4 goals and assisting another four. Following his return in action after the World Cup break and an injury, Serbian sources confirmed that Stuttgart expressed interest in his services with an initial 6-month loan and an option to buy for the summer, with AEK Athens denying any negotiation, unless potential offers exceed the sum of €8,000,000. He scored on the last game of the season against Volos in a 4–0 home victory which helped AEK win the title.

On 21 September 2023, Gaćinović scored with a low volley after a cross from Ehsan Hajsafi helping to a triumphant 3–2 away win against Brighton & Hove Albion for the first game of the Europa League group stage. This was AEK Athens' first win on English soil since 1978.

== International career ==
Gaćinović played for Bosnia and Herzegovina at the Under-17 level, before eventually choosing to represent Serbia at the under-19 level. He was a member of the team that won the 2013 UEFA European Under-19 Championship. Furthermore, Gaćinović scored an equalizer against Portugal in the 85th minute of the semi-final. He also appeared at the 2014 UEFA European Under-19 Championship.

Subsequently, Gaćinović represented Serbia at the 2015 FIFA U-20 World Cup, winning the gold medal.

He debuted for the senior national team on 24 March 2017 against Georgia, replacing Filip Kostić in the 81st minute, and scored the third goal for Serbia in the 86th minute. In May 2018 he was named in Serbia's preliminary squad for the 2018 FIFA World Cup in Russia, but he wasn't selected for the final squad.

Gaćinović was selected in Serbia's squad for the UEFA Euro 2024. He played in a group stage match against Slovenia. Serbia finished fourth in the group.

== Career statistics ==
=== Club ===
As of 13 March 2026

Club	Season	League			National cup (Note: Includes Serbian Cup, DFB-Pokal, Greek Football Cup)		Europe		Other		Total	
Club	Season	Division	Apps	Goals	Apps	Goals	Apps	Goals	Apps	Goals	Apps	Goals
Vojvodina	2012–13	Serbian SuperLiga	5	1	1	0	0	0	—		6	1
Vojvodina	2013–14	Serbian SuperLiga	20	0	4	1	3	0	—		27	1
Vojvodina	2014–15	Serbian SuperLiga	25	11	3	0	0	0	—		28	11
Vojvodina	Total		50	12	8	1	3	0	—		61	13
Eintracht Frankfurt	2015–16	Bundesliga	9	1	0	0	—		—		9	1
Eintracht Frankfurt	2016–17	Bundesliga	28	2	6	0	—		—		34	2
Eintracht Frankfurt	2017–18	Bundesliga	29	1	4	3	—		—		33	4
Eintracht Frankfurt	2018–19	Bundesliga	29	0	1	0	14 (Note: Appearances in UEFA Europa League)	2	1 (Note: Appearance in DFL-Supercup)	0	45	2
Eintracht Frankfurt	2019–20	Bundesliga	23	0	3	0	10	1	—		36	1
Eintracht Frankfurt	Total		118	4	14	3	24	3	1	0	157	10
TSG Hoffenheim	2020–21	Bundesliga	23	0	2	0	7	1	—		32	1
TSG Hoffenheim	2021–22	Bundesliga	4	0	2	0	—		—		6	0
TSG Hoffenheim	Total		27	0	4	0	7	1	—		38	1
Panathinaikos (loan)	2021–22	Super League Greece	13	0	4	0	—		—		17	0
AEK Athens	2022–23	Super League Greece	30	9	5	0	—		—		35	9
AEK Athens	2023–24	Super League Greece	26	3	2	1	7 (Note: Three appearances in UEFA Champions League, four appearance and one goal in UEFA Europa League)	1	—		35	5
AEK Athens	2024–25	Super League Greece	20	2	5	0	4 (Note: Appearances in UEFA Conference League)	1	—		29	3
AEK Athens	2025–26	Super League Greece	13	0	2	0	10	2	—		25	2
AEK Athens	Total		89	14	14	1	21	4	—		124	19
Career total			297	30	44	5	55	8	1	0	397	43

=== International ===
Serbia
Year	Apps	Goals
2017	5	2
2018	6	0
2019	7	0
2020	5	0
2021	0	0
2022	0	0
2023	1	0
2024	4	0
2025	0	0
2026	2	0
Total	30	2

International goals

As of match played 2 September 2017

No.	Date	Venue	Cap	Opponent	Score	Result	Competition
1	24 March 2017	Boris Paichadze Dinamo Arena, Tbilisi, Georgia	1	Georgia	3–1	3–1	2018 FIFA World Cup qualification
2	2 September 2017	Partizan Stadium, Belgrade, Serbia	2	Moldova	1–0	3–0	2018 FIFA World Cup qualification

== Honours ==
Vojvodina

- Serbian Cup: 2013–14

Eintracht Frankfurt

- DFB-Pokal: 2017–18

Panathinaikos

- Greek Cup: 2021–22

AEK Athens

- Super League Greece: 2022–23, 2025–26
- Greek Cup: 2022–23

Serbia

- UEFA Under-19 Championship: 2013
- FIFA U-20 World Cup: 2015

Individual

- Serbian SuperLiga Team of the Season: 2013–14, 2014–15
- Super League Greece Team of the Season: 2022–23

Orders

- Medal of Merit (Republika Srpska)
