= Lukas Hradecky =

Finland international footballer (born 1989)

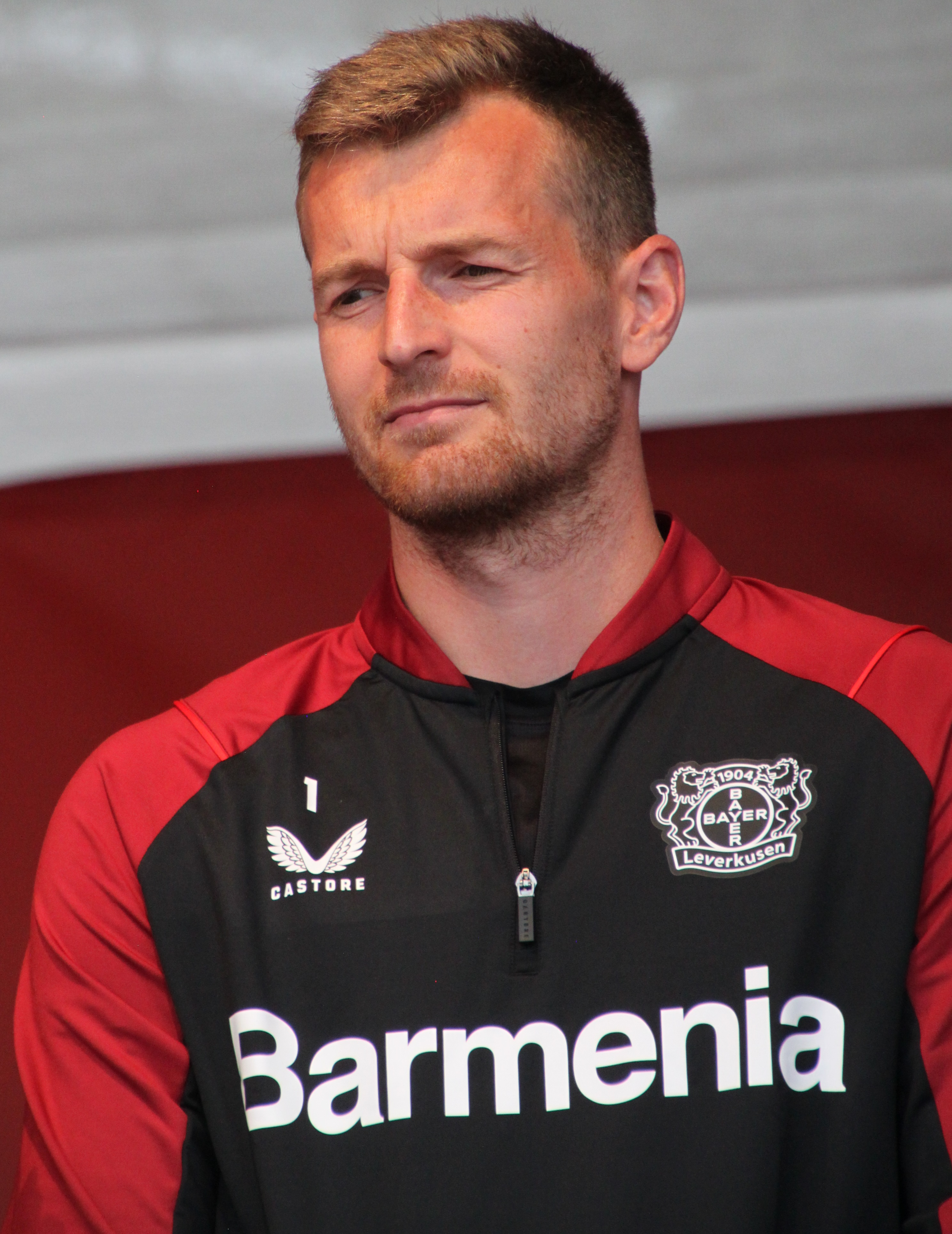
- Hradecky with Bayer Leverkusen in 2022

Personal information
- Date of birth: 24 November 1989 (age 36)
- Place of birth: Bratislava, Czechoslovakia
- Height: 1.92 m (6 ft 4 in)
- Position: Goalkeeper

Team information
- Current team: Monaco
- Number: 1

Youth career
- –2000: TPK
- 2001–2008: TPS

Senior career*
Years	Team	Apps	(Gls)
2008	TPS	0	(0)
2008	→ ÅIFK (loan)	11	(0)
2009–2013	Esbjerg fB	76	(0)
2013–2015	Brøndby	69	(0)
2015–2018	Eintracht Frankfurt	101	(0)
2018–2025	Bayer Leverkusen	222	(0)
2025–	Monaco	28	(0)

International career^{‡}
2006	Finland U17	1	(0)
2007	Finland U18	11	(0)
2007–2008	Finland U19	5	(0)
2008–2009	Finland U20	2	(0)
2009–2010	Finland U21	10	(0)
2010–	Finland	109	(0)
Medal record
Men's football
Finland
Runner-up	Baltic Cup	2012
Third place	Baltic Cup	2014
- * Club domestic league appearances and goals as of 21 November 2026 ‡ National team caps and goals as of 12 November 2026

Lukas Hradecky (Note: Hradecky's name is "Lukas Hradecký" on his Finnish passport, and the name on his Slovak passport is "Lukáš Hradecký".) (Slovak: Lukáš Hradecký; born 24 November 1989) is a professional footballer who plays as a goalkeeper for Ligue 1 club Monaco and the Finland national team.

Born in Bratislava, present-day Slovakia, Hradecky was raised in the Finnish city of Turku from the age of one. He began his senior club career playing for TPS, before signing with Esbjerg fB at age 19 in 2009. After winning his first trophy, the Danish 1st Division, during his third season in Denmark, he helped Esbjerg win the Danish Cup in 2013. Hradecky was named Finnish Footballer of the Year by the Football Association of Finland in three consecutive seasons (2016 to 2018). In the 2023–24 season, under the management of Xabi Alonso, Hradecky captained Bayer Leverkusen to their first ever Bundesliga championship title.

Formerly an international at under-17, under-18, under-19, under-20 and under-21 levels, Hradecky made his debut for Finland in May 2010 at the age of 20. He appeared in nine out of ten of Finland's UEFA Euro 2020 qualification matches and helped the national team secure its first ever appearance at the UEFA European Championship.

== Club career ==
=== TPS ===
Hradecky began his career in Turun Palloseura, a club in Turku, where he grew up. In 2008, he played in the International Karel Stegeman U-19 Youth Tournament in Ruurlo, Netherlands, where he won the prize for best goalkeeper.

=== Esbjerg ===
On 10 January 2009, Hradecky transferred to Esbjerg fB and signed a four-year contract with the five-time Danish champions. On 3 August 2010 it was announced that Hradecky had been called to be tested for a week by Manchester United to strengthen their goalkeeping department after the departure of Tom Heaton. However, he chose to seek the chance to be the primary keeper in Esbjerg instead. After the 2012–13 Superliga season Hradecky's contract with Esbjerg fB expired, and an agreement to prolong the contract was not reached.

=== Brøndby ===
On 12 June 2013, Hradecky joined Danish Superliga club Brøndby IF on a four-year contract on a free transfer. On 21 June 2013 Hradecky made his debut in the Superliga in a match against Vestsjælland.

=== Eintracht Frankfurt ===
In August 2015, Hradecky transferred from Brøndby to German team Eintracht Frankfurt. The value of the transfer was never published, but according to newspapers Eintracht paid €2.5 million to Brøndby. In 2017–18, Hradecky's last season with Eintracht, he was voted Bundesliga Goalkeeper of the Season as the club won the DFB-Pokal title.

=== Bayer Leverkusen ===
In May 2018, Bayer Leverkusen announced the signing of Hradecky for the 2018–19 season on a free transfer. He signed a contract until 2023. Hradecky made his debut in Leverkusen on 15 September 2018 in a match against Bayern Munich. Since the 2021–22 season, Hradecky has captained Leverkusen. On 6 August 2022, he was sent off during Leverkusen's defeat against Borussia Dortmund for handball after reaching out to grab the ball in front of his box.

On 30 August 2022, Hradecky renewed his contract with Leverkusen, signing a deal until the end of June 2026. In the first half of the 2023–24 season under the manager Xabi Alonso, Hradecky helped his team to a flying start leading the Bundesliga with a streak of 16 league games without losses (25 games unbeaten in all competitions combined), recording seven clean sheets, which is the most of any goalkeepers in the league in the ongoing season.

On 3 February 2024, in a 2–0 away win against Darmstadt, Hradecky had his 80th clean sheet in 280 Bundesliga matches in his career, which is the most of any foreign-born goalkeepers in the league's entire history. On 14 April 2024, after a 5–0 home win against Werder Bremen, Hradecky and Leverkusen secured the club's first ever Bundesliga championship title, five rounds prior to season ending. A month later, on 5 May, he featured in his 292nd Bundesliga match in a 5–1 away win over his former club Eintracht Frankfurt, breaking Yann Sommer's record to become the foreign goalkeeper with the most appearances in the German top tier.

On 12 May 2024, in a 5–0 away win against VfL Bochum, Hradecky had his 16th clean sheet in the season in all competitions combined, and helped Leverkusen to stay unbeaten for the record 50 consecutive games in the 2023–24 season. Hradecky and Leverkusen also won the 2023–24 DFB-Pokal, keeping a clean sheet after beating 1. FC Kaiserslautern 1–0 in the German Cup final on 25 May 2024. In June 2024, Hradecky was named the 9th best goalkeeper in the world, in the top 100 list by ESPN.

On 17 August 2024, Hradecky and Leverkusen were crowned the DFL-Supercup champions after winning VfB Stuttgart on penalties, completing Leverkusen's first ever triple. On 19 October, in a match against his former club Eintracht Frankfurt, Hradecky made his 300th Bundesliga appearance, as the first foreign goalkeeper in the history of the German top tier. On 25 January 2025, after a 2–2 draw against RB Leipzig, Hradecky became only the second player in the Bundesliga history to have played at least 50 consecutive league matches unbeaten. His streak of unbeaten matches continued to 54, which is two matches short of the Bundesliga record that was set by Jérôme Boateng.

=== Monaco ===
On 8 August 2025, Hradecky signed a two-year contract with Monaco, through 30 June 2027, with an option to extend for one more year, for a transfer fee of €2.5 million with further €1 million in bonuses.

== International career ==
=== Finland youth teams ===
Hradecky earned several caps for Finland on different junior levels. He made his junior level national team debut when he was 16 years old on 16 November 2006 in Athens in a match against Greece. He was a member of the Finland national under-20 football team and represented the team at the Valentin A. Granatkin Memorial Tournament. Hradecky was selected to Finland national under-21 football team for 2009 UEFA European Under-21 Championship but he had to withdraw due to a knee injury. He was the first choice keeper for Finland's under-21 side during the 2011 UEFA European U21 Championship qualifications.

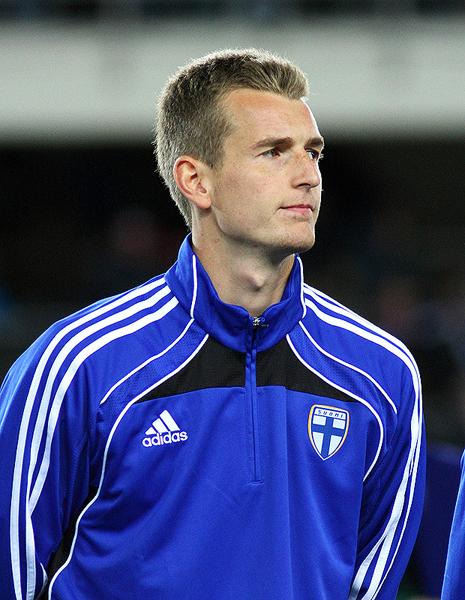
Hradecky with Finland in 2011

=== Finland first team ===
In January 2010 Hradecky was called to the Finland national football team by Stuart Baxter to face South Korea in a friendly at Málaga, Spain. Hradecky was at the bench the whole match. He finally made his first team debut on 21 May 2010, when he replaced Jukka Lehtovaara for the second half in a 2–0 away loss against Estonia. He played his first UEFA European Championship qualification game on 3 June 2011 when Mixu Paatelainen chose him to the starting line up against San Marino in Serravalle. During autumn of 2011 he established himself as a regular in the Finland national team and appeared in the UEFA European Championship qualification matches against Moldova, Netherlands and Sweden.

Hradecky appeared in three friendly matches during Finland's preparation for 2014 FIFA World Cup qualification. He was chosen to starting line up in the first qualification match against France, but remained as a substitute for the rest of the campaign as Niki Mäenpää established himself as the number one choice.

Hradecky was called up for the UEFA Euro 2020 pre-tournament friendly match against Sweden on 29 May 2021. He played in all three international games at the UEFA Euro 2020 tournament. Finland was placed 3rd in Group B following a 2–0 defeat to Belgium on 21 June 2021. They were subsequently knocked out of the tournament. Hradecky was awarded as the tournament's best goalkeeper of the group stage.

On 7 June 2025, Hradecky marked his 100th international appearance for Finland, in a World Cup qualifying match against the Netherlands.

== Personal life ==
Hradecky was born in the Kramáre area of Bratislava. In September 1990, his father, a volleyball player, moved to Finland and started playing for Ruskon Pallo -67, based in Turku. That winter, the family settled in Runosmäki. His brothers Tomas and Matej are also professional footballers.

Hradecky has a dual citizenship of Finland and Slovakia. He speaks Finnish, Slovak, English, Danish, German and Swedish.

In January 2024, it was reported that Hradecky had invested in the restaurant business in Helsinki, along with Teemu Pukki and his brother Matej. Hradecky has been a minority shareholder of his former club Turun Palloseura (TPS). In mid-August 2024, it was reported that Hradecky had increased his share and is currently one of the club's majority owners. He also started as an advisor of the board of TPS.

== Career statistics ==
=== Club ===
As of match played 21 November 2026

Appearances and goals by club, season and competition
Club	Season	League			National cup (Note: Includes Danish Cup, DFB-Pokal, Coupe de France)		Europe		Other		Total	
Club	Season	Division	Apps	Goals	Apps	Goals	Apps	Goals	Apps	Goals	Apps	Goals
TPS	2008	Veikkausliiga	0	0	0	0	—		—		0	0
Åbo IFK (loan)	2008	Kakkonen	11	0	0	0	—		—		11	0
Esbjerg fB	2009–10	Danish Superliga	5	0	0	0	—		—		5	0
Esbjerg fB	2010–11	Danish Superliga	13	0	2	0	—		—		15	0
Esbjerg fB	2011–12	Danish 1st Division	23	0	0	0	—		—		23	0
Esbjerg fB	2012–13	Danish Superliga	33	0	5	0	—		—		38	0
Esbjerg fB	Total		74	0	7	0	—		—		81	0
Brøndby	2013–14	Danish Superliga	33	0	0	0	—		—		33	0
Brøndby	2014–15	Danish Superliga	33	0	2	0	2 (Note: Appearances in UEFA Europa League)	0	—		37	0
Brøndby	2015–16	Danish Superliga	3	0	0	0	6	0	—		9	0
Brøndby	Total		69	0	2	0	8	0	—		79	0
Eintracht Frankfurt	2015–16	Bundesliga	34	0	1	0	—		2 (Note: Appearances in Bundesliga relegation play-offs)	0	37	0
Eintracht Frankfurt	2016–17	Bundesliga	33	0	6	0	—		—		39	0
Eintracht Frankfurt	2017–18	Bundesliga	34	0	6	0	—		—		40	0
Eintracht Frankfurt	Total		101	0	13	0	—		2	0	116	0
Bayer Leverkusen	2018–19	Bundesliga	32	0	2	0	6	0	—		40	0
Bayer Leverkusen	2019–20	Bundesliga	34	0	5	0	11 (Note: Six appearances in UEFA Champions League, five appearances in UEFA Europa League)	0	—		50	0
Bayer Leverkusen	2020–21	Bundesliga	29	0	3	0	5	0	—		37	0
Bayer Leverkusen	2021–22	Bundesliga	32	0	2	0	7	0	—		41	0
Bayer Leverkusen	2022–23	Bundesliga	33	0	1	0	14 (Note: Six appearances in UEFA Champions League, eight appearances in UEFA Europa League)	0	—		48	0
Bayer Leverkusen	2023–24	Bundesliga	33	0	2	0	0	0	—		35	0
Bayer Leverkusen	2024–25	Bundesliga	29	0	1	0	4 (Note: Appearances in UEFA Champions League)	0	1 (Note: Appearance in DFL-Supercup)	0	35	0
Bayer Leverkusen	Total		222	0	16	0	47	0	1	0	286	0
Monaco	2025–26	Ligue 1	17	0	1	0	2	0	—		20	0
Monaco	2026–27	Ligue 1	11	0	0	0	5 (Note: Appearances in UEFA Conference League)	0	—		16	0
Monaco	Total		28	0	1	0	7	0	—		36	0
Career total			504	0	37	0	62	0	3	0	608	0

=== International ===
As of match played 12 November 2026

Appearances and goals by national team and year
National team	Year	Competitive		Friendly		Total	
National team	Year	Apps	Goals	Apps	Goals	Apps	Goals
Finland	2010	0	0	1	0	1	0
Finland	2011	4	0	3	0	7	0
Finland	2012	1	0	3	0	4	0
Finland	2013	0	0	3	0	3	0
Finland	2014	1	0	3	0	4	0
Finland	2015	6	0	1	0	7	0
Finland	2016	4	0	4	0	8	0
Finland	2017	6	0	1	0	7	0
Finland	2018	5	0	3	0	8	0
Finland	2019	9	0	0	0	9	0
Finland	2020	6	0	0	0	6	0
Finland	2021	9	0	1	0	10	0
Finland	2022	5	0	2	0	7	0
Finland	2023	9	0	0	0	9	0
Finland	2024	6	0	1	0	7	0
Finland	2025	4	0	1	0	5	0
Finland	2026	4	0	3	0	7	0
Total		79	0	30	0	109	0

== Honours ==
Esbjerg fB

- Danish Cup: 2012–13
- Danish 1st Division: 2011–12

Eintracht Frankfurt

- DFB-Pokal: 2017–18

Bayer Leverkusen

- Bundesliga: 2023–24
- DFB-Pokal: 2023–24
- DFL-Supercup: 2024

Finland

- Baltic Cup runner-up: 2012
- FIFA Series: 2026

Individual

- Football Association of Finland Promising Player of the Year: 2007
- Football Association of Finland: Finnish Footballer of the Year: 2016, 2017, 2018, 2021, 2023, 2024
- Best Goalkeeper Award at International Karel Stegeman U-19 Youth Tournament: 2008
- Finland national under-21 football team Goalkeeper of the Year: 2010
- Finland national under-21 football team Player of the Year: 2010
- Danish Superliga Goalkeeper of the Year: 2013
- Danish Superliga Best Player of the Spring Season: 2013
- Esbjerg fB Best Player of the Season: 2013
- Finnish Sports Journalists Footballer of the Year: 2016, 2017, 2018, 2020, 2021, 2023
- Finnish Sports Personality of the Year: 2020
- Bundesliga Team of the Season: 2017–18

== See also ==
- List of European association football families
- List of men's footballers with 100 or more international caps
