= Marco Russ =

German footballer (born 1985)

Personal information
- Date of birth: 4 August 1985 (age 41)
- Place of birth: Hanau, West Germany
- Height: 1.90 m (6 ft 3 in)
- Positions: Centre-back; defensive midfielder

Team information
- Current team: Eintracht Frankfurt (match analyst)

Youth career
- 1989–1996: VfB Großauheim
- 1996–2004: Eintracht Frankfurt

Senior career*
Years	Team	Apps	(Gls)
2004–2011	Eintracht Frankfurt	163	(13)
2011–2013	VfL Wolfsburg	24	(1)
2013	→ Eintracht Frankfurt (loan)	10	(1)
2013–2020	Eintracht Frankfurt	111	(9)
Total		308	(24)

International career
2006	Germany U20	1	(0)

Managerial career
- 2020–: Eintracht Frankfurt (Match Analyst)
- * Club domestic league appearances and goals

Marco Russ (born 4 August 1985) is a German former professional footballer who played as a centre-back or defensive midfielder, spending most of his career in the Bundesliga with Eintracht Frankfurt.

== Club career ==
Born in Hanau, Hesse, Russ advanced through the youth system at nearby Eintracht Frankfurt. He made his debut in 2004, and on 29 April 2006 played in the DFB-Pokal final, a 1–0 loss to Bayern Munich at the Olympiastadion in Berlin.

On 26 September 2009, he received a straight red card in the 33rd minute of a 3–0 home loss to VfB Stuttgart at the Commerzbank-Arena for a foul on Sami Khedira.

In July 2011, after Frankfurt's relegation to the 2. Bundesliga, Russ became a transfer target for VfL Wolfsburg manager Felix Magath. On the 16th, he became the second player that summer to make the move from Frankfurt to the Volkswagen Arena, joining Patrick Ochs by signing a three-year deal for a fee of around €3.5 million.

After two seasons in Lower Saxony, Russ returned to his former club in June 2013 after an earlier loan. He competed with the team in that season's UEFA Europa League, making eight appearances in all; on 19 September he scored from Tranquillo Barnetta's corner kick in a 3–0 group stage home win over FC Girondins de Bordeaux.

In May 2016, Russ took a routine anti-doping test which showed high levels of the hormone human chorionic gonadotropin (hCG), which can be produced either by anabolic steroids or cancer. After consulting a doctor on the 18th, it was confirmed that he had a malignant tumour. However, he put himself forward to play their promotion/relegation play-off against 1. FC Nürnberg the following day. In the match, he scored an own goal from Sebastian Kerk's free kick in a 1–1 home draw; Frankfurt stayed up 2–1 on aggregate with Russ absent from the second leg.

Russ returned to the pitch after undergoing therapy on 28 February 2017 in a DFB-Pokal quarter-final against Arminia Bielefeld, coming on in place of Aymen Barkok at the end of the 1–0 win at the Commerzbank Arena. In the next round on 25 April away to Borussia Mönchengladbach, he came on in extra time of the 1–1 draw and scored the shot that took the penalty shootout to sudden death, with his team prevailing. He was an unused substitute in the final, a loss by a single goal to Borussia Dortmund.

Although not a first-team regular under manager Niko Kovač, Russ scored the first goal since his cancer diagnosis on 10 February 2018 in a 4–2 home win over 1. FC Köln. He played all six matches of their 2017–18 DFB-Pokal conquest, with every minute of their first five games, and sixteen in place of Jonathan de Guzmán at the end of the 3–1 final win over Bayern on 19 May.

Russ announced his retirement from playing in June 2020 and was immediately hired as Match Analyst for Eintracht.

== International career ==
Russ played one friendly for the Germany U20 national team in 2006.

== Honours ==
Eintracht Frankfurt

- DFB-Pokal: 2017–18; runner-up 2005–06, 2016–17
