= Jesús Vallejo =

Spanish footballer (born 1997)

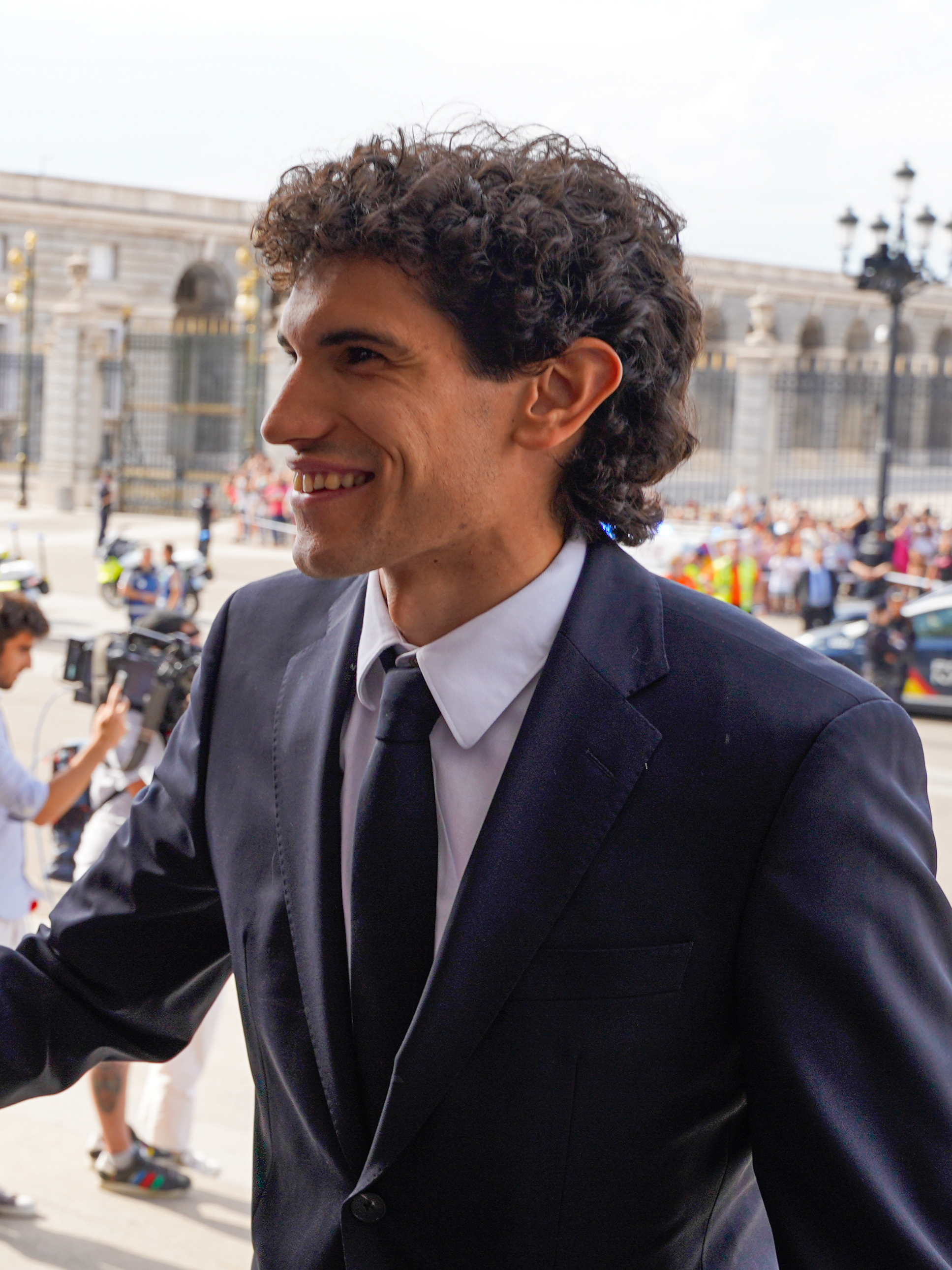
- Vallejo in 2022

Personal information
- Full name: Jesús Vallejo Lázaro
- Date of birth: 5 January 1997 (age 29)
- Place of birth: Zaragoza, Spain
- Height: 1.84 m (6 ft 0 in)
- Position: Centre-back

Team information
- Current team: Albacete
- Number: 24

Youth career
- 2007–2008: Oliver
- 2008–2014: Zaragoza

Senior career*
Years	Team	Apps	(Gls)
2014–2015	Zaragoza	29	(1)
2015–2025	Real Madrid	22	(1)
2015–2016	→ Zaragoza (loan)	20	(0)
2016–2017	→ Eintracht Frankfurt (loan)	25	(1)
2019–2020	→ Wolverhampton Wanderers (loan)	2	(0)
2020–2021	→ Granada (loan)	32	(0)
2023–2024	→ Granada (loan)	3	(0)
2025–	Albacete	36	(1)

International career
2013	Spain U16	1	(0)
2013–2014	Spain U17	6	(0)
2014–2015	Spain U19	11	(2)
2015–2019	Spain U21	22	(0)
2021	Spain U23	5	(0)
Medal record
Men's football
Representing Spain
Olympic Games
Silver medal – second place	2020	Team
Representing Spain
UEFA European Under-21 Championship
Winner	2019
Runner-up	2017
Representing Spain
UEFA European Under-19 Championship
Winner	2015
- * Club domestic league appearances and goals as of 21:32, 21 October 2026 (UTC)

Jesús Vallejo Lázaro (born 5 January 1997) is a Spanish professional footballer who plays as a centre-back for Segunda División club Albacete.

He started his career with Zaragoza. In 2015, the 18-year-old signed for Real Madrid, being consecutively loaned to Zaragoza, Eintracht Frankfurt, Wolverhampton Wanderers and Granada (twice) and being a reserve player during his ten-year spell.

Vallejo was a youth international for Spain, winning the 2019 European Under-21 Championship and conquering silver with the Olympic team in 2020.

== Club career ==
=== Zaragoza ===
Born in Zaragoza, Aragon, Vallejo joined Real Zaragoza's youth setup in 2008, aged 11. On 26 July 2013, after impressing in the Juvenil squad, he signed a new deal with the club.

On 23 August 2014, before even having appeared for the reserves, Vallejo made his professional debut, starting in a 0–0 draw at Recreativo de Huelva in the Segunda División. On 26 December, he further extended his contract until 2019.

Vallejo scored his first professional goal on 5 April 2015, the last in the 1–1 away draw against Tenerife. He was appointed team captain by manager Ranko Popović for that match, and remained in the role afterwards.

=== Real Madrid ===
On 31 July 2015, Vallejo signed a six-year contract with Real Madrid for a rumoured €6 million fee, being immediately loaned back to Zaragoza for one year. The following summer, he moved abroad after agreeing to a one-year loan deal with German club Eintracht Frankfurt.

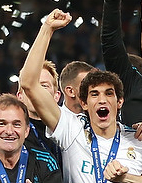
Vallejo celebrating the 2018 UEFA Champions League with Real Madrid

Vallejo's maiden appearance in the Bundesliga took place on 27 August 2016, as he came as a late substitute in a 1–0 home win over Schalke 04. He scored his first goal also from the bench, contributing to a 2–2 draw to RB Leipzig also at the Commerzbank-Arena in the last match of the season.

On 7 July 2017, Vallejo was unveiled as a Real Madrid player and member of the first team squad for the upcoming campaign. He was handed the number 3 shirt, previously worn by Pepe. His official debut took place on 26 October, when he started and was sent off in the last minute of a 2–0 away win against Fuenlabrada in the Copa del Rey. His maiden appearance in La Liga occurred ten days later, when he partnered Sergio Ramos in the 3–0 home defeat of Las Palmas.

Profiting from injury to Nacho and suspension to Ramos, Vallejo made his debut in the UEFA Champions League on 11 April 2018, playing the entire 1–3 home loss to Juventus in the second leg of the quarter-finals, which still qualified to the last-four 4–3 on aggregate. It was his only appearance, as Madrid won their third consecutive and 13th overall title in the tournament.

On 27 July 2019, after agreeing to a new six-year deal, Vallejo moved to English side Wolverhampton Wanderers on a season-long loan. He made his competitive debut on 15 August, in a 4–0 home win against Pyunik in the third qualifying round of the UEFA Europa League. He played his first Premier League match on 14 September, featuring the full 90 minutes in the 5–2 loss to Chelsea also at Molineux. He made one further league appearance, but was not used again except for an EFL Cup tie in a side consisting mainly of reserve players.

At the start of the January transfer window, Wolves' head coach Nuno Espírito Santo confirmed that Vallejo was likely to leave and added that the defender "had moments that he played, moments that he performed well, and some moments he didn't perform well ... Clearly it didn't work out". On 24 January 2020, he was loaned to Granada of the Spanish top tier until June; on 18 August, the move was extended for another year, and he featured 12 times in the Andalusians' quarter-final run in the Europa League for a total of 37 over the campaign.

Due to suspensions and injuries, Vallejo started in the 4–0 home victory over Espanyol on 30 April 2022 as Real Madrid clinched their 35th league title, partnering Casemiro in central defence. He played only eight competitive matches during the season, however.

On 15 July 2023, Vallejo returned to Granada on a season-long loan. He totalled just 106 minutes in his second stint, being relegated as last.

Vallejo's input for Madrid in the 2024–25 campaign consisted of four appearances: in the first, on 24 September 2024 against Alavés, as the home crowd requested that Carlo Ancelotti brought him in with the score at 3–0 for the hosts, he replaced Éder Militão for the last 15 minutes of an eventual 3–2 win; from then on, he further fell down the pecking order, with youth player Raúl Asencio being preferred over him.

On 30 May 2025, Real Madrid announced that Vallejo would leave the club upon the expiration of his contract.

=== Albacete ===
On 14 July 2025, Vallejo joined second-division Albacete on a free transfer, signing a two-year deal. He made his debut on 18 August, playing 90 minutes and performing well in a 4–4 draw away to Almería.

Vallejo scored his first goal in over six years on 17 December 2025, equalising the 2–2 draw against Celta de Vigo in the round of 32 of the cup in injury time. He later converted his penalty shootout attempt as the hosts won 3–0.

== International career ==
On 7 March 2013, Vallejo appeared with the Spain under-16 team in a friendly with Hungary. He earned his first cap for the under-21s on 26 March 2015 at the age of 18, starting in the 2–0 win against Norway in Cartagena in another exhibition game.

Selected for the 2017 Under-21 European Championship finals by manager Albert Celades, Vallejo played four times for the eventual runners-up. Even though he was not part of the squad of 23 for the 2018 FIFA World Cup finals, he was picked by full side head coach Julen Lopetegui for a friendly with Switzerland to be held on 3 June.

Vallejo was one of 22 players selected by the under-23 team for the 2020 Summer Olympics, delayed until the summer of 2021 due to the COVID-19 pandemic.

== Career statistics ==
As of match played 30 May 2026

Appearances and goals by club, season and competition
Club	Season	League			National Cup (Note: Includes Copa del Rey, DFB-Pokal)		League Cup (Note: Includes EFL Cup)		Continental		Other		Total	
Club	Season	Division	Apps	Goals	Apps	Goals	Apps	Goals	Apps	Goals	Apps	Goals	Apps	Goals
Zaragoza	2014–15	Segunda División	29	1	—		—		—		4 (Note: Appearances in La Liga play-offs)	0	33	1
Zaragoza (loan)	2015–16	Segunda División	20	0	—		—		—		—		20	0
Eintracht Frankfurt (loan)	2016–17	Bundesliga	25	1	2	0	—		—		—		27	1
Real Madrid	2017–18	La Liga	7	0	4	0	—		1 (Note: Appearances in UEFA Champions League)	0	0	0	12	0
Real Madrid	2018–19	La Liga	5	1	1	0	—		1	0	0	0	7	1
Real Madrid	2021–22	La Liga	5	0	1	0	—		2	0	0	0	8	0
Real Madrid	2022–23	La Liga	1	0	1	0	—		1	0	1 (Note: Appearance in FIFA Club World Cup)	0	4	0
Real Madrid	2024–25	La Liga	4	0	0	0	—		0	0	0	0	4	0
Real Madrid	Total		22	1	7	0	—		5	0	1	0	35	1
Wolverhampton Wanderers (loan)	2019–20	Premier League	2	0	0	0	2	0	3 (Note: Appearances in UEFA Europa League)	0	—		7	0
Granada (loan)	2019–20	La Liga	11	0	3	0	—		—		—		14	0
Granada (loan)	2020–21	La Liga	21	0	4	0	—		12	0	—		37	0
Granada (loan)	2023–24	La Liga	3	0	0	0	—		—		—		3	0
Granada (loan)	Total		35	0	7	0	—		12	0	—		54	0
Albacete	2025–26	Segunda División	31	0	3	1	—		—		—		34	1
Career total			164	3	19	1	2	0	20	0	5	0	210	4

== Honours ==
Real Madrid

- La Liga: 2021–22
- Copa del Rey: 2022–23
- Supercopa de España: 2021–22
- UEFA Champions League: 2017–18, 2021–22
- UEFA Super Cup: 2022, 2024
- FIFA Club World Cup: 2017, 2018, 2022
- FIFA Intercontinental Cup: 2024

Spain U19

- UEFA European Under-19 Championship: 2015

Spain U21

- UEFA European Under-21 Championship: 2019; runner-up 2017

Spain U23

- Summer Olympics silver medal: 2020

Individual

- UEFA European Under-21 Championship Team of the Tournament: 2019
