= Furkan Zorba =

Turkish footballer (born 1998)

Personal information
- Date of birth: 25 February 1998 (age 28)
- Place of birth: Rüsselsheim am Main, Germany
- Height: 1.84 m (6 ft 0 in)
- Position: Centre-back

Youth career
- FSV 07 Raunheim
- 1. FC Hattersheim
- 2009–2017: Eintracht Frankfurt

Senior career*
Years	Team	Apps	(Gls)
2016–2017	Eintracht Frankfurt	0	(0)
2017–2019	VfL Osnabrück	4	(0)
2019–2022	Türkgücü München	22	(1)
2022	Tuzlaspor	0	(0)
2022	→ Diyarbakırspor (loan)	1	(0)

International career
2017	Turkey U19	2	(0)
- * Club domestic league appearances and goals as of 20:56, 22 September 2022 (UTC)

Furkan Zorba (born 25 February 1998) is a footballer who plays as a centre-back. Born in Germany, he represented Turkey at under-19 international level.
