= Robert Kampka =

German football referee

- Full name: Dr. Robert Kampka
- Born: 21 February 1982 (age 44); Görlitz, East Germany
- Other occupation: Military doctor

Domestic
Years	League	Role
2004–	DFB	Referee
2010–	2. Bundesliga	Referee
2016–2020	Bundesliga	Referee

Robert Kampka (born 21 February 1982) is a German football referee who is based in Mainz. He referees for TSV Schornbach of the Württemberg Football Association.

== Refereeing career ==
Kampka has officiated for the German Football Association since 2003, and refereed in the Regionalliga starting in 2004. In 2008, he was promoted to the 3. Liga, and in 2010 he moved up to the 2. Bundesliga. In the summer of 2016, Kampka was one of four referees promoted to officiate in the Bundesliga.

On 15 April 2005, Kampka was the referee of a 3. Liga match between Jahn Regensburg and 1899 Hoffenheim. Due to the 2005 football betting scandal, an early warning system was set in place to detect possible tampering. The system, created by Betradar, was designed to detect unusual betting odds for matches. Betradar then informed the DFB. This was the first instance that the new system had triggered after nearly a year in place.

== Personal life ==
Kampka lives in Mainz, where he is a military doctor by profession.
