= Leon Bätge =

German footballer

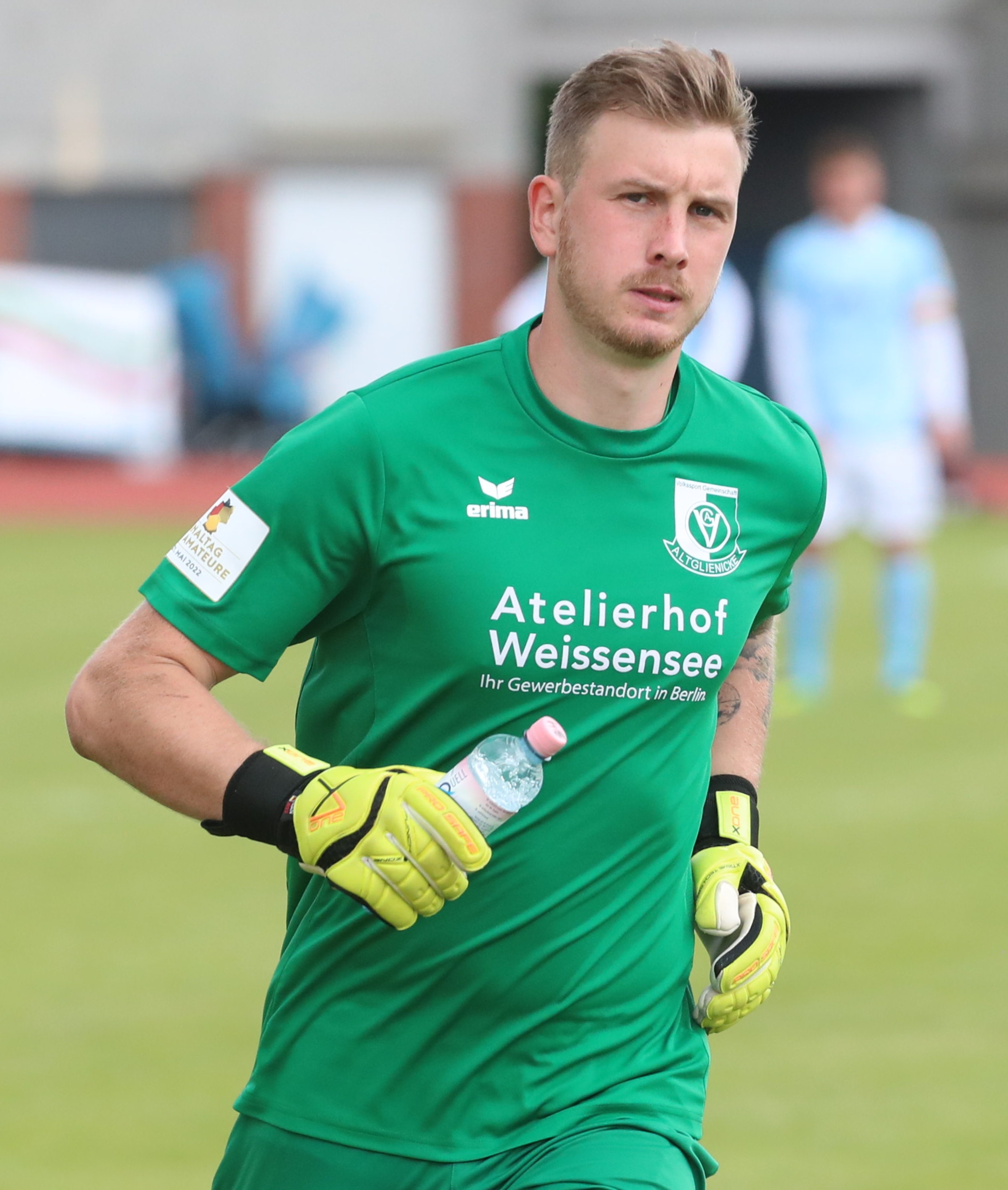

Personal information
- Date of birth: 9 July 1997 (age 29)
- Place of birth: Wolfsburg, Germany
- Height: 1.88 m (6 ft 2 in)
- Position: Goalkeeper

Team information
- Current team: BFC Dynamo
- Number: 34

Youth career
- –2006: TSV Adler Jahrstedt
- 2006–2009: FC Brome
- 2009–2015: VfL Wolfsburg
- 2015–2016: Eintracht Frankfurt

Senior career*
| Years | Team | Apps | (Gls) |
| 2016–2018 | Eintracht Frankfurt | 0 | (0) |
| 2018–2020 | Würzburger Kickers | 14 | (0) |
| 2020–2023 | VSG Altglienicke | 76 | (1) |
| 2023– | BFC Dynamo | 42 | (0) |
- * Club domestic league appearances and goals as of 23 September 2024

Leon Bätge (born 9 July 1997) is a German footballer who plays as a goalkeeper for BFC Dynamo.
