= 2014–15 Borussia Mönchengladbach season =

Borussia Mönchengladbach
2014–15 season
- President: Rolf Königs
- Head coach: Lucien Favre
- Stadium: Borussia Park
- Bundesliga: 3rd
- DFB-Pokal: Quarter-finals
- UEFA Europa League: Round of 32
- Top goalscorer: League: Raffael (12); All: Patrick Herrmann (16)
Home colours	Away colours	Third colours

The 2014–15 Borussia Mönchengladbach season was the 115th season in the club's football history. In the previous season, Borussia finished in fifth place and thus qualified for the UEFA Europa League Play-off Round. In the Bundesliga, it was the club's seventh consecutive season, having been promoted from the 2. Bundesliga in 2008.

== Players ==
=== Squad ===
As of 6 July 2014

Note: Flags indicate national team as defined under FIFA eligibility rules; some limited exceptions apply. Players may hold more than one non-FIFA nationality.

No.	Pos.	Nation	Player
1	GK	SUI	Yann Sommer
3	DF	BEL	Filip Daems (captain)
4	DF	NED	Roel Brouwers
6	MF	GER	Mahmoud Dahoud
7	MF	GER	Patrick Herrmann
8	MF	GUI	Ibrahima Traoré
10	FW	GER	Max Kruse
11	FW	BRA	Raffael
14	MF	GER	Thorben Marx
15	DF	ESP	Álvaro Domínguez
16	MF	NOR	Håvard Nordtveit
17	DF	SWE	Oscar Wendt
18	DF	GER	Marvin Schulz
19	DF	USA	Fabian Johnson

No.	Pos.	Nation	Player
20	DF	GER	Nico Brandenburger
21	GK	GER	Janis Blaswich
23	MF	GER	Christoph Kramer (on loan from Bayer Leverkusen)
24	DF	GER	Tony Jantschke
26	FW	BEL	Thorgan Hazard
27	DF	GER	Julian Korb
28	FW	GER	André Hahn
31	FW	SWE	Branimir Hrgota
33	GK	GER	Christofer Heimeroth
34	MF	SUI	Granit Xhaka
39	DF	AUT	Martin Stranzl (vice-captain)

=== Transfers ===
==== In ====
Note: Flags indicate national team as defined under FIFA eligibility rules; some limited exceptions apply. Players may hold more than one non-FIFA nationality.

No.	Pos.	Nation	Player
1	GK	SUI	Yann Sommer (from FC Basel)
8	MF	GUI	Ibrahima Traoré (from VfB Stuttgart)
19	DF	USA	Fabian Johnson (from 1899 Hoffenheim)
26	MF	BEL	Thorgan Hazard (from Chelsea)
28	MF	GER	André Hahn (from FC Augsburg)

==== Out ====
Note: Flags indicate national team as defined under FIFA eligibility rules; some limited exceptions apply. Players may hold more than one non-FIFA nationality.

No.	Pos.	Nation	Player
—	GK	GER	Marc-André ter Stegen (at Barcelona)
—	FW	NED	Luuk de Jong (at PSV)
—	FW	GER	Elias Kachunga (at SC Paderborn)
—	MF	VEN	Juan Arango (at Tijuana)
—	MF	GER	Lukas Rupp (at SC Paderborn)

== Season overview ==
=== August ===
In the first round draw of the DFB-Pokal, Mönchengladbach were drawn against FC 08 Homburg. The match took place on 16 August. Mönchengladbach got two goals from Branimir Hrgota and an extra goal from André Hahn. Hahn gave Mönchengladbach a 1–0 lead before Marc Gallego for Homburg equalized in the 20th minute. Then Hrgota scored in the 45th and 51st minutes to give Mönchengladbach a 3–1 lead.

In Borussia Mönchengladbach's opening match of the Bundesliga campaign, on matchday 1, on 24 August, resulted in a 1–1 draw against VfB Stuttgart. Christoph Kramer scored for Mönchengladbach and Alexandru Maxim scored for Stuttgart. Maxim gave Stuttgart the lead in the 51st minute than Kramer equalized in the 90th minute. Mönchengladbach finished the matchday in 10th place.

On matchday 2, on 31 August, Mönchengladbach and SC Freiburg finished their match in a 0–0 draw. There were three yellow cards handed out in the match. Mönchengladbach finished the matchday in 11th place.

=== September ===
On matchday 3, on 13 September, Mönchengladbach defeated Schalke 04 4–1. Mönchengladbach got two goals from André Hahn and a goal each from Max Kruse, Raffael and Eric Maxim Choupo-Moting scored for Schalke. Hahn gave Mönchengladbach a 2–0 lead when he scored his two goals in the 17th and 50th minutes. Chuopo-Moting pulled Schalke a goal back in the 52nd minute before Kruse restored the two-goal lead in the 56th minute. Raffael put Mönchengladbach up 4–1 in the 79th minute. Mönchengladbach finished the matchday in sixth place.

The match between Mönchengladbach and 1. FC Köln, on matchday 4, on 21 September, finished in a 0–0 draw. Mönchengladbach finished the matchday in Seventh place.

Then on matchday 5, on 24 September, Mönchengladbach defeated Hamburger SV 1–0 with a 24th-minute goal from Max Kruse. Mönchengladbach finished the matchday in sixth place.

Then on matchday 6, on 27 September, Mönchengladbach defeated SC Paderborn 2–1. Patrick Herrmann and Raffael scored for Mönchengladbach and Jens Wemmer scored for Paderborn. Herrmann scored in the eighth minute and Raffael scored in the 14th minute to give Mönchengladbach a 2–0 lead. Wemmer pulled Paderborn a goal back in the 70th minute. Mönchengladbach finished the matchday in second place.

=== October ===
The match between Mönchengladbach and Mainz 05 on matchday 7, on 5 October, finished in a 1–1 draw. Max Kruse scored for Mönchengladbach and Jonas Hofmann scored for Mainz. Kruse gave Mönchengladbach a 1–0 lead in the 15th minute before Hofmann equalized from a penalty shot in the 31st minute. Mönchengladbach finished the matchday in third place.

On matchday 8, on 18 October, Mönchengladbach defeated Hannover 96 3–0 with two goals from Max Kruse and a goal from Granit Xhaka. Kruse scored his first goal in the 14th minute, then Xhaka made it 2–0 in the 49th minute, Kruse got his second goal in the 90th minute. Mönchengladbach finished the matchday in second place.

The match between Mönchengladbach and Bayern Munich, on matchday 9, on 26 October, finished in a 0–0 draw. Mönchengladbach finished the matchday in second place.

In the second round of the DFB-Pokal, Mönchengladbach were drawn against Eintracht Frankfurt. The match took place on 29 October. Mönchengladbach won 2–1. Thorgan Hazard and Ibrahima Traoré scored for Mönchengladbach and Václav Kadlec scored for Frankfurt. Hazard scored in the 17th minute and Traoré scored in the 67th minute to put Mönchengladbach up 2–0. Kadlec pulled one back in the 89th minute.

=== November ===
On matchday 10, on 2 November, Mönchengladbach defeated 1899 Hoffenheim 3–1. Mönchengladbach got two goals from Patrick Herrmann and a goal from André Hahn. Anthony Modeste scored for Hoffenheim. Hahn scored in the 12th minute to give Mönchengladbach the lead. Then Modeste equalized in the 30th minute. Mönchengladbach reclaimed the lead when Herrmann scored two minutes later. He got his second goal of the match in the 52nd minute. Mönchengladbach finished the matchday in third place.

=== March ===
In the round 3 draw of the DFB-Pokal, Mönchengladbach were drawn against Kickers Offenbach. The match took place on 4 March. Mönchengladbach won 2–0 with goals from Max Kruse and Patrick Herrmann. Kruse scored in the 52nd minute from a penalty shot and Herrmann scored in the 83rd minute.

The match on matchday 24, on 7 March, between Mönchengladbach and 1. FSV Mainz 05 finished in a 2–2 draw. Mönchengladbach took a 2–0 lead when Raffael scored in the 27th and 67th minutes. However, Mainz came back to score two goals from Johannes Geis and Shinji Okazaki. Mönchengladbach finished the matchday in third place.

On matchday 25, on 15 March, Mönchengladbach defeated Hannover 95 2–0 with two goals from Patrick Herrmann. Herrmann scored in the 43rd and 75th minutes. Mönchengladbach finished the matchday in third place.

On matchday 26, on 22 March, Mönchengladbach defeated Bayern 2–0 with two goals by Raffael. Raffael scored in the 30th and 77th minutes. Mönchengladbach finished the matchday in third place.

=== April ===
In the quarter-final draw of the DFB-Pokal, Mönchengladbach were drawn against Arminia Bielefeld. The match took place on 9 April. The match drew at 1–1, and after extra time, went into penalties. Mönchengladbach lost 4–5 on penalties.

== Competitions ==
=== Bundesliga ===
==== League table ====
Pos	Team	Pld	W	D	L	GF	GA	GD	Pts	Qualification or relegation
1	Bayern Munich (C)	34	25	4	5	80	18	+62	79	Qualification for the Champions League group stage
2	VfL Wolfsburg	34	20	9	5	72	38	+34	69	Qualification for the Champions League group stage
3	Borussia Mönchengladbach	34	19	9	6	53	26	+27	66	Qualification for the Champions League group stage
4	Bayer Leverkusen	34	17	10	7	62	37	+25	61	Qualification for the Champions League play-off round
5	FC Augsburg	34	15	4	15	43	43	0	49	Qualification for the Europa League group stage (Note: Since the winners of the 2014–15 DFB-Pokal, VfL Wolfsburg, qualified for the Champions League based on league position, the Europa League group stage spot was passed to the sixth-placed team, Schalke 04; and the Europa League third qualifying round spot was passed to the seventh-placed team, Borussia Dortmund.)

Source: DFB
Rules for classification: 1) points; 2) goal difference; 3) number of goals scored
(C) Champions

==== Results summary ====
Overall								Home						Away					
Pld	W	D	L	GF	GA	GD	Pts	W	D	L	GF	GA	GD	W	D	L	GF	GA	GD
34	19	9	6	53	26	+27	66	12	3	2	32	14	+18	7	6	4	21	12	+9

Last updated: 9 May 2015.
Source: Matches

==== Results by round ====
Round	1	2	3	4	5	6	7	8	9	10	11	12	13	14	15	16	17	18	19	20	21	22	23	24	25	26	27	28	29	30	31	32	33	34
Ground	H	A	H	A	H	A	H	A	H	H	A	H	A	H	A	H	A	A	H	A	H	A	H	A	H	A	A	H	A	H	A	H	A	H
Result	D	D	W	D	W	W	D	W	D	W	L	L	L	W	D	W	L	W	W	L	W	D	W	D	W	W	W	W	D	W	W	W	W	L
Position	10	11	5	7	6	2	3	2	2	3	3	3	5	6	5	3	4	3	3	5	3	3	3	3	3	3	3	3	4	3	3	3	3	3

Updated to match(es) played on 9 May 2015. Source: Matches
A = Away; H = Home; W = Win; D = Draw; L = Loss

==== Matches ====
24 August 2014 1	Borussia Mönchengladbach	1–1	VfB Stuttgart	Mönchengladbach
17:30 CEST (UTC+02:00)	Traoré (yellow card) 31'; Xhaka (yellow card) 76'; Kramer 90'	Report	Maxim 51'; Ibišević (yellow card) 64'	Stadium: Borussia-Park; Attendance: 50,203; Referee: Christian Dingert

31 August 2014 2	SC Freiburg	0–0	Borussia Mönchengladbach	Freiburg im Breisgau
17:30 CEST (UTC+02:00)	Schahin (yellow card) 10'	Report	Jantschke (yellow card) 76'; Korb (yellow card) 90'	Stadium: Mage Solar Stadion; Attendance: 24,000; Referee: Peter Gagelmann

13 September 2014 3	Borussia Mönchengladbach	4–1	Schalke 04	Mönchengladbach
18:30 CEST (UTC+02:00)	Hahn 17', 50', (yellow card) 56'; Stranzl (yellow card) 51'; Kruse 56'; Raffael 79'	Report	Höger (yellow card) 34'; Neustädter (yellow card) 36'; Chuopo-Moting 52' (pen.); Boateng (yellow card) 65'	Stadium: Borussia-Park; Attendance: 54,010; Referee: Felix Brych

21 September 2014 4	1. FC Köln	0–0	Borussia Mönchengladbach	Cologne
17:30 CEST (UTC+02:00)	Lehmann (yellow card) 39'; Vogt (yellow card) 73'	Report	Kramer (yellow card) 19'; Hahn (yellow card) 74'	Stadium: RheinEnergieStadion; Attendance: 50,000; Referee: Felix Zwayer

24 September 2014 5	Borussia Mönchengladbach	1–0	Hamburger SV	Mönchengladbach
20:00 CEST (UTC+02:00)	Kramer (yellow card) 19'; Kruse 25'	Report	Diekmeier (yellow card) 41'	Stadium: Borussia-Park; Attendance: 44,175; Referee: Deniz Aytekin

27 September 2014 6	SC Paderborn	1–2	Borussia Mönchengladbach	Paderborn
15:30 CEST (UTC+02:00)	Vrančić (yellow card) 44'; Wemmer 70'	Report	Herrmann 8'; Raffael 14'; Sommer (yellow card) 88'	Stadium: Benteler Arena; Attendance: 15,000; Referee: Marco Fritz

5 October 2014 7	Borussia Mönchengladbach	1–1	Mainz 05	Mönchengladbach
17:30 CEST (UTC+02:00)	Kruse 15'	Report	Hofmann 31' (pen.); Okazaki (yellow card) 43'; Đuričić (yellow card) 57'; Díaz (yellow card) 90'	Stadium: Borussia-Park; Attendance: 50,383; Referee: Manuel Gräfe

18 October 2014 8	Hannover 96	0–3	Borussia Mönchengladbach	Hannover
15:30 CEST (UTC+02:00)	Schulz (yellow card) 65'	Report	Kruse 14', 90'; Xhaka 49'; Stranzl (yellow card) 87'	Stadium: Niedersachsenstadion; Attendance: 49,000; Referee: Thorsten Kinhöfer

26 October 2014 9	Borussia Mönchengladbach	0–0	Bayern Munich	Mönchengladbach
17:30 CET (UTC+01:00)	Wendt (yellow card) 48'	Report	Götze (yellow card) 45'; Dante (yellow card) 48'; Benatia (yellow card) 63'	Stadium: Borussia-Park; Attendance: 54,010; Referee: Felix Zwayer

2 November 2014 10	Borussia Mönchengladbach	3–1	1899 Hoffenheim	Mönchengladbach
15:30 CET (UTC+01:00)	Hahn 12'; Herrmann 32', 52', (yellow card) 43'	Report	Strobl (yellow card) 9'; Modeste 30'	Stadium: Borussia-Park; Attendance: 52,409; Referee: Deniz Aytekin

9 November 2014 11	Borussia Dortmund	1–0	Borussia Mönchengladbach	Dortmund
17:30 CET (UTC+01:00)	Kramer 58' (o.g.); Durm (yellow card) 80'; Papastathopoulos (yellow card) 83'; Immobile (yellow card) 90'	Report	Nordtveit (yellow card) 15'; Kramer (yellow card) 66'	Stadium: Westfalenstadion; Attendance: 80,667; Referee: Felix Brych

22 November 2014 12	Borussia Mönchengladbach	1–3	Eintracht Frankfurt	Mönchengladbach
15:30 CET (UTC+01:00)	Nordtveit 5'; Domínguez (yellow card) 75'; Xhaka (yellow card) 90+1' (yellow-red card) 90+2'	Report	Russ (yellow card) 9'; Stendera 54'; Meier 57'; Chandler (yellow card) 59'; Oczipka (yellow card) 68'; Inui 73'	Stadium: Borussia-Park; Attendance: 54,010; Referee: Bastian Dankert

30 November 2014 13	VfL Wolfsburg	1–0	Borussia Mönchengladbach	Wolfsburg
15:30 CET (UTC+01:00)	Knoche 12'	Report	Domínguez (yellow card) 53'; Nordtveit (yellow card) 73'	Stadium: Volkswagen Arena; Attendance: 30,000; Referee: Wolfgang Stark

6 December 2014 14	Borussia Mönchengladbach	3–2	Hertha BSC	Mönchengladbach
15:30 CET (UTC+01:00)	Jantschke 9', (yellow card) 90+1'; Raffael 53'; Xhaka (yellow card) 68'; Hazard 83'	Report	Hegeler (yellow card) 9'; Schieber 45'; Hosogai (yellow card) 55'; Skjelbred (yellow card) 80'; Kalou 90+2' (pen.)	Stadium: Borussia-Park; Attendance: 50,190; Referee: Marco Fritz

14 December 2014 15	Bayer Leverkusen	1–1	Borussia Mönchengladbach	Leverkusen
15:30 CET (UTC+01:00)	Çalhanoğlu 18'; Wendell (yellow card) 28'; Kießling (yellow card) 49'; Jedvaj (yellow card) 62'; Bender (yellow card) 90+3'	Report	Brouwers 40'; Domínguez (yellow card) 51'	Stadium: BayArena; Attendance: 30,210; Referee: Peter Gagelmann

17 December 2014 16	Borussia Mönchengladbach	4–1	Werder Bremen	Mönchengladbach
20:00 CET (UTC+01:00)	Kruse 32' (pen.); Brouwers (yellow card) 37'; Wendt 38'; Kramer 64'; Hrgota 88'	Report	Junuzović 51'; Caldirola (yellow card) 63' (yellow-red card) 66'; Fritz (yellow card) 69'	Stadium: Borussia-Park; Attendance: 44,513; Referee: Robert Hartmann

20 December 2014 17	FC Augsburg	2–1	Borussia Mönchengladbach	Augsburg
15:30 CET (UTC+01:00)	Callsen-Bracker (yellow card) 2'; Feulner 20'; Bobadilla 51'; Baba (yellow card) 75'; Kohr (yellow card) 89'	Report	Kruse 3' (pen.); Traoré (yellow card) 65'; Kramer (yellow card) 79'	Stadium: SGL arena Attendance: 30,660; Referee: Bastian Dankert

31 January 2015 18	VfB Stuttgart	0–1	Borussia Mönchengladbach	Stuttgart
15:30 CET (UTC+01:00)	Gentner (yellow card) 33'; Niedermeier (yellow card) 50'; Kostić (yellow card) 79'	Report	Xhaka (yellow card) 33'; Hermann 71'; Korb (yellow card) 81'	Stadium: Mercedes-Benz Arena; Attendance: 46,200; Referee: Christian Dingert

3 February 2015 19	Borussia Mönchengladbach	1–0	SC Freiburg	Mönchengladbach
20:00 CET (UTC+01:00)	Herrmann 23'; Xhaka (yellow card) 61'	Report	Sorg (yellow card) 55'; Torrejón (yellow card) 68'	Stadium: Borussia-Park; Attendance: 37,091; Referee: Markus Schmidt

6 February 2015 20	Schalke 04	1–0	Borussia Mönchengladbach	Gelsenkirchen
20:30 CET (UTC+01:00)	Barnetta 10'; Aogo (yellow card) 90+2'	Report		Stadium: Veltins-Arena; Attendance: 61,973; Referee: Wolfgang Stark

14 February 2015 21	Borussia Mönchengladbach	1–0	1. FC Köln	Mönchengladbach
15:30 CET (UTC+01:00)	Xhaka (yellow card) 43' (goal) 90+1'; Hazard (yellow card) 90+3'	Report	Wimmer (yellow card) 24'; Osako (yellow card) 38'; Risse (yellow card) 61'; Peszko (yellow card) 66'	Stadium: Borussia-Park; Attendance: 54,010; Referee: Deniz Aytekin

22 February 2015 22	Hamburger SV	1–1	Borussia Mönchengladbach	Hamburg
15:30 CET (UTC+01:00)	Djourou (yellow card) 39'; Kačar (yellow card) 49'; Stieber 73'; Jiráček (yellow card) 90+3'	Report	Traoré (yellow card) 9'; Jantschke (yellow card) 90'; Kruse (yellow card) 90'; Hrgota 90+2'	Stadium: Volksparkstadion; Attendance: 52,105; Referee: Felix Zwayer

1 March 2015 23	Borussia Mönchengladbach	2–0	SC Paderborn	Mönchengladbach
15:30 CET (UTC+01:00)	Johnson 18'; Herrmann 81'	Report	Rupp (yellow card) 54'; Vrančić (yellow card) 62'	Stadium: Borussia-Park; Attendance: 53,152; Referee: Michael Weiner

7 March 2015 24	Mainz 05	2–2	Borussia Mönchengladbach	Mainz
18:30 CET (UTC+01:00)	Geis 73'; Okazaki 77'; Hofmann (yellow card) 80'	Report	Raffael 27', 67'; Xhaka (yellow card) 72'; Wendt (yellow card) 80'	Stadium: Coface Arena; Attendance: 34,000; Referee: Marco Fritz

15 March 2015 25	Borussia Mönchengladbach	2–0	Hannover 96	Mönchengladbach
17:30 CET (UTC+01:00)	Herrmann 43', 75'; Stranzl (yellow card) 70'	Report		Stadium: Borussia-Park; Attendance: 49,134; Referee: Jochen Drees

22 March 2015 26	Bayern Munich	0–2	Borussia Mönchengladbach	Munich
17:30 CET (UTC+01:00)		Report	Jantschke (yellow card) 22'; Raffael 30', 77'; Hahn (yellow card) 51'	Stadium: Allianz Arena; Attendance: 75,000; Referee: Florian Meyer

4 April 2015 27	1899 Hoffenheim	1–4	Borussia Mönchengladbach	Sinsheim
15:30 CEST (UTC+02:00)	Schipplock 17'; Kim (yellow card) 45+2'; Abraham (yellow card) 63'; Rudy (yellow card) 90'	Report	Kruse 26' (pen.); Herrmann 31', 51'; Raffael 36'; Xhaka (yellow card) 69'; Kramer (yellow card) 82'	Stadium: Rhein-Neckar Arena; Attendance: 30,150; Referee: Thorsten Kinhöfer

11 April 2015 28	Borussia Mönchengladbach	3–1	Borussia Dortmund	Mönchengladbach
15:30 CEST (UTC+02:00)	Wendt 1'; Brouwers (yellow card) 12'; Raffael 32'; Nordtveit 67'	Report	Gündoğan 77'	Stadium: Borussia-Park; Attendance: 54,010; Referee: Manuel Gräfe

17 April 2015 29	Eintracht Frankfurt	0–0	Borussia Mönchengladbach	Frankfurt
20:30 CEST (UTC+02:00)	Anderson Bamba (yellow card) 9'; Medojević (yellow card) 49'; Oczipka (yellow card) 51'	Report	Wendt (yellow card) 7'; Herrmann (yellow card) 58'	Stadium: Commerzbank-Arena; Attendance: 51,500; Referee: Marco Fritz

26 April 2015 30	Borussia Mönchengladbach	1–0	VfL Wolfsburg	Mönchengladbach
17:30 CEST (UTC+02:00)	Herrmann (yellow card) 47'; Raffael (yellow card) 77'; Kruse 90'	Report	Arnold (yellow card) 31'; Luiz Gustavo (yellow card) 75'	Stadium: Borussia-Park; Attendance: 52,147; Referee: Bastian Dankert

3 May 2015 31	Hertha BSC	1–2	Borussia Mönchengladbach	Berlin
17:30 CEST (UTC+02:00)	Stocker 13'; Skjelbred (yellow card) 15'; Kalou (yellow card) 38'	Report	Kruse 11'; Xhaka (yellow card) 31'; Korb (yellow card) 53'; Herrmann (yellow card) 70'; Traoré 85'	Stadium: Olympiastadion; Attendance: 56,881; Referee: Thorsten Kinhöfer

9 May 2015 32	Borussia Mönchengladbach	3–0	Bayer Leverkusen	Mönchengladbach
15:30 CEST (UTC+02:00)	Kruse 50'; Kramer (yellow card) 60'; Herrmann 81'; Xhaka (yellow card) 83'; Traoré 88'	Report	Bender (yellow card) 44'; Hilbert (yellow card) 61'; Toprak (yellow card) 87'	Stadium: Borussia-Park; Attendance: 53,761; Referee: Peter Gagelmann

16 May 2015 33	Werder Bremen	0–2	Borussia Mönchengladbach	Bremen
15:30 CEST (UTC+02:00)		Report	Jantschke (yellow card) 31'; Raffael 53', 85'	Stadium: Weserstadion; Attendance: 42,100; Referee: Christian Dingert

23 May 2015 34	Borussia Mönchengladbach	1–3	FC Augsburg	Mönchengladbach
15:30 CEST (UTC+02:00)	Xhaka (yellow card) 21'; Herrmann (yellow card) 26'; Raffael 36'; Nordtveit (red card) 61'; Wendt (yellow card) 85'; Kruse (yellow card) 90+4'	Report	Højbjerg (yellow card) 35', (goal) 72'; Kohr (yellow card) 45'; Matavž 77'; Mölders 90+5'	Stadium: Borussia-Park; Attendance: 54,010; Referee: Michael Weiner

=== DFB-Pokal ===
15 August 2014 Round 1	FC 08 Homburg	1–3	Borussia Mönchengladbach	Homburg
19:00 CEST (UTC+02:00)	Gallego 20'; Gallego (yellow card) 73'; Kröner (yellow card) 75'	Report	Hahn 8'; Hrgota 45+2', 52'	Stadium: Waldstadion Homburg; Attendance: 17,000; Referee: Benjamin Cortus

29 October 2014 Round 2	Eintracht Frankfurt	1–2	Borussia Mönchengladbach	Frankfurt
20:30 CET (UTC+01:00)	Kadlec 89'	Report	Hazard 17'; Jantschke (yellow card) 41'; Traoré 67'; Domínguez (yellow card) 68'	Stadium: Commerzbank-Arena; Attendance: 46,500; Referee: Knut Kircher

4 March 2015 Round 3	Kickers Offenbach	0–2	Borussia Mönchengladbach	Offenbach am Main
20:30 CET (UTC+01:00)	Gjasula (yellow card) 37'; Müller (yellow card) 51'	Report	Kramer (yellow card) 43'; Kruse 52' (pen.); Xhaka (yellow card) 57'; Brouwers (yellow card) 75'; Herrmann 83'	Stadium: Sparda Bank Hessen Stadium; Attendance: 20,500; Referee: Christian Dingert

9 April 2015 Quarter-finals	Arminia Bielefeld	1–1 (a.e.t.) (5–4 p)	Borussia Mönchengladbach	Bielefeld
19:00 CEST (UTC+02:00)	Junglas (yellow card) 12'; Klos (yellow card) 23' (goal) 26'; Burmeister (yellow card) 104'; Ulm (yellow card) 110'	Report	Kruse 32' (pen.); Hahn (yellow card) 45'; Hazard (yellow card) 65'; Brouwers (yellow card) 90+2'; Xhaka (yellow card) 104'; Jantschke (yellow card) 111'	Stadium: Bielefelder Alm; Attendance: 26,137; Referee: Wolfgang Stark
	Penalties
	Klos (penalty scored); Dick (penalty scored); Ulm (penalty scored); Brinkmann (penalty scored); Lorenz (penalty missed); Burmeister (penalty scored)		(penalty missed) Raffael; (penalty scored) Johnson; (penalty scored) Xhaka; (penalty scored) Brouwers; (penalty scored) Kruse; (penalty missed) Traoré

=== UEFA Europa League ===
==== Play-off round ====
21 August 2014 First leg	FK Sarajevo (Bosnia and Herzegovina)	2–3	(Germany) Borussia Mönchengladbach	Sarajevo, Bosnia and Herzegovina
20:45 CEST (UTC+02:00)	Puzigaća 26'; Tatomirović (yellow card) 31'; Duljević 59'	Report	Hahn 11'; Hrgota 41', 73'	Stadium: Stadion Asim Ferhatović Hase; Attendance: 29,000; Referee: Antonio Mateu Lahoz (Spain)

28 August 2014 Second leg	Borussia Mönchengladbach (Germany)	7–0 (10–2 agg.)	(Bosnia and Herzegovina) FK Sarajevo	Mönchengladbach, Germany
20:45 CEST (UTC+02:00)	Hahn 20'; Xhaka 24'; Jantschke (yellow card) 31'; Hrgota 34', 67', 82'; Hazard 74' (pen.), 90+2'	Report	Dupovac (yellow card) 73'; Berberović (yellow card) 74'; Tatomirović (yellow card) 89' (yellow-red card) 90'	Stadium: Borussia-Park; Attendance: 44,152; Referee: Vladislav Bezborodov (Russia)

==== Group stage ====
Pos	Team	Pld	W	D	L	GF	GA	GD	Pts	Qualification	MGB	VIL	ZUR	APL
1	(Germany) Borussia Mönchengladbach	6	3	3	0	14	4	+10	12	Advance to knockout phase	—	1–1	3–0	5–0
2	(Spain) Villarreal	6	3	2	1	15	7	+8	11	Advance to knockout phase	2–2	—	4–1	4–0
3	(Switzerland) Zürich	6	2	1	3	10	14	−4	7		1–1	3–2	—	3–1
4	(Cyprus) Apollon Limassol	6	1	0	5	4	18	−14	3		0–2	0–2	3–2	—

Source: Soccerway
Rules for classification: Group stage tiebreakers

18 September 2014 1	Borussia Mönchengladbach (Germany)	1–1	(Spain) Villarreal	Mönchengladbach, Germany
19:00 CEST (UTC+02:00)	Herrmann 21'	Report	Pina (yellow card) 19'; Uche 68'	Stadium: Borussia-Park; Attendance: 39,128; Referee: Ivan Kružliak (Slovakia)

2 October 2014 2	Zürich (Switzerland)	1–1	(Germany) Borussia Mönchengladbach	Zürich, Switzerland
21:05 CEST (UTC+02:00)	Etoundi 23'; Djimsiti (yellow card) 35'	Report	Nordtveit 25'	Stadium: Letzigrund; Attendance: 18,422; Referee: Slavko Vinčić (Slovenia)

23 October 2014 3	Borussia Mönchengladbach (Germany)	5–0	(Cyprus) Apollon Limassol	Mönchengladbach, Germany
21:05 CEST (UTC+02:00)	Traoré 11', 67'; Stranzl (yellow card) 54'; Hrgota 56'; Nordtveit (yellow card) 77'; Herrmann 83'; Angeli 90+1' (o.g.)	Report		Stadium: Borussia-Park; Attendance: 38,182; Referee: Yevhen Aranovskiy (Ukraine)

6 November 2014 4	Apollon Limassol (Cyprus)	0–2	(Germany) Borussia Mönchengladbach	Nicosia, Cyprus
19:00 CET (UTC+01:00)		Report	Raffael 55'; Herrmann 90+5'	Stadium: GSP Stadium; Attendance: 5,258; Referee: Antony Gautier (France)

27 November 2014 5	Villarreal (Spain)	2–2	(Germany) Borussia Mönchengladbach	Villarreal, Spain
21:05 CET (UTC+01:00)	Vietto 26'; Bruno (yellow card) 39'; Cheryshev 63'; Trigueros (yellow card) 68'	Report	Brouwers (yellow card) 17'; Raffael 55'; Xhaka 67', (yellow card) 77'	Stadium: Estadio El Madrigal; Attendance: 16,000; Referee: Szymon Marciniak (Poland)

11 December 2014 6	Borussia Mönchengladbach (Germany)	3–0	(Switzerland) Zürich	Mönchengladbach, Germany
19:00 CET (UTC+01:00)	Herrmann 31'; Hrgota 58', 64'	Report	Koch (yellow card) 32'	Stadium: Borussia-Park; Attendance: 44,323; Referee: Luca Banti (Italy)

==== Knockout phase ====
===== Round of 32 =====
19 February 2015 First leg	Sevilla (Spain)	1–0	(Germany) Borussia Mönchengladbach	Seville, Spain
21:05 CET (UTC+01:00)	Vitolo (yellow card) 30'; Iborra 70'; Carriço (yellow card) 75'	Report	Jantschke (yellow card) 8'; Xhaka (yellow card) 14'; Stranzl (yellow card) 43'; Kramer (yellow card) 65'	Stadium: Ramón Sánchez Pizjuán Stadium; Attendance: 26,850; Referee: Aleksandar Stavrev (Macedonia)

26 February 2015 Second leg	Borussia Mönchengladbach (Germany)	2–3 (4–2 agg.)	(Spain) Sevilla	Mönchengladbach, Germany
19:00 CET (UTC+01:00)	Xhaka 19', (yellow card) 32' (yellow-red card) 68'; Hazard 29' (yellow card) 54'; Kramer (yellow card) 69'	Report	Bacca 8' (yellow card) 45+1'; Vitolo 26', 79'; Iborra (yellow card) 30'; Rico (yellow card) 45'; Vidal (yellow card) 66'; Gameiro (yellow card) 90+2'	Stadium: Borussia-Park; Attendance: 45,337; Referee: Marijo Strahonja (Croatia)

== Statistics ==
=== Appearances and goals ===
No.	Pos	Nat	Player	Total		Bundesliga		DFB-Pokal		UEFA Europa League	
No.	Pos	Nat	Player	Apps	Goals	Apps	Goals	Apps	Goals	Apps	Goals
Goalkeepers
1	GK	(Switzerland) SUI	Yann Sommer	34	0	34	0	0	0	0	0
21	GK	(Germany) GER	Janis Blaswich	0	0	0	0	0	0	0	0
33	GK	(Germany) GER	Christofer Heimeroth	0	0	0	0	0	0	0	0
Defenders
3	DF	(Belgium) BEL	Filip Daems	0	0	0	0	0	0	0	0
4	DF	(Netherlands) NED	Roel Brouwers	20	1	15+5	1	0	0	0	0
15	DF	(Spain) ESP	Álvaro Domínguez	24	0	23+1	0	0	0	0	0
17	DF	(Sweden) SWE	Oscar Wendt	26	2	25+1	2	0	0	0	0
19	DF	(United States) USA	Fabian Johnson	24	1	15+9	1	0	0	0	0
24	DF	(Germany) GER	Tony Jantschke	31	1	31	1	0	0	0	0
27	DF	(Germany) GER	Julian Korb	24	0	23+1	0	0	0	0	0
39	DF	(Austria) AUT	Martin Stranzl	19	0	18+1	0	0	0	0	0
Midfielders
6	MF	(Germany) GER	Mahmoud Dahoud	1	0	0+1	0	0	0	0	0
7	MF	(Germany) GER	Patrick Herrmann	32	11	26+6	11	0	0	0	0
8	MF	(Guinea) GUI	Ibrahima Traoré	24	2	8+16	2	0	0	0	0
14	MF	(Germany) GER	Thorben Marx	0	0	0	0	0	0	0	0
16	MF	(Norway) NOR	Håvard Nordtveit	22	2	11+11	2	0	0	0	0
23	MF	(Germany) GER	Christoph Kramer	30	2	28+2	2	0	0	0	0
34	MF	(Switzerland) SUI	Granit Xhaka	30	2	30	2	0	0	0	0
Forwards
10	FW	(Germany) GER	Max Kruse	32	11	29+3	11	0	0	0	0
11	FW	(Brazil) BRA	Raffael	31	12	28+3	12	0	0	0	0
26	FW	(Belgium) BEL	Thorgan Hazard	28	1	7+21	1	0	0	0	0
28	FW	(Germany) GER	André Hahn	23	3	15+8	3	0	0	0	0
31	FW	(Sweden) SWE	Branimir Hrgota	17	2	8+9	2	0	0	0	0

Last updated: 30 May 2015
Source: BDFutbol

=== Goalscorers ===
This includes all competitive matches. The list is sorted by shirt number when total goals are equal.

Rank	Pos	No.	Nat	Name	Bundesliga	DFB-Pokal	Europa League	Total
1	MF	7	(Germany)	Patrick Herrmann	11	1	4	16
1	FW	11	(Brazil)	Raffael	12	0	2	14
3	FW	10	(Germany)	Max Kruse	11	2	0	13
4	FW	31	(Sweden)	Branimir Hrgota	2	2	8	12
5	FW	28	(Germany)	André Hahn	3	1	2	6
6	MF	34	(Switzerland)	Granit Xhaka	2	0	3	5
6	FW	26	(Belgium)	Thorgan Hazard	1	1	3	5
8	MF	8	(Guinea)	Ibrahima Traoré	2	0	2	4
9	MF	16	(Norway)	Håvard Nordtveit	2	0	1	3
10	MF	23	(Germany)	Christoph Kramer	2	0	0	2
10	DF	17	(Sweden)	Oscar Wendt	2	0	0	2
12	DF	24	(Germany)	Tony Jantschke	1	0	0	1
12	DF	4	(Netherlands)	Roel Brouwers	1	0	0	1
12	DF	19	(United States)	Fabian Johnson	1	0	0	1
Total					53	7	25	85

Last updated: 30 May 2015

=== Disciplinary record ===
Includes all competitive matches. The list is sorted by shirt number when total cards are equal.

Rank	Pos.	No.	Nat	Player	Bundesliga		DFB-Pokal		Europa League		Total	
Rank	Pos.	No.	Nat	Player	Yellow card	Red card	Yellow card	Red card	Yellow card	Red card	Yellow card	Red card
1	MF	23	(Germany)	Christoph Kramer	2	0	0	0	0	0	2	0
1	DF	26	(Germany)	Tony Jantschke	1	0	0	0	1	0	2	0
1	MF	28	(Germany)	André Hahn	2	0	0	0	0	0	2	0
4	GK	1	(Switzerland)	Yann Sommer	1	0	0	0	0	0	1	0
4	MF	8	(Guinea)	Ibrahima Traoré	1	0	0	0	0	0	1	0
4	DF	27	(Germany)	Julian Korb	1	0	0	0	0	0	1	0
4	MF	34	(Switzerland)	Granit Xhaka	1	1	0	0	0	1	1	2
4	DF	39	(Austria)	Martin Stranzl	1	0	0	0	0	0	1	0
TOTALS					10	0	0	0	1	0	11	0

Last updated on 25 September 2014
