= 2015–16 Borussia Mönchengladbach season =

Borussia Mönchengladbach
2015–16 season
- President: Rolf Königs
- Head coach: Lucien Favre (until 20 September); André Schubert (from 21 September)
- Stadium: Borussia-Park
- Bundesliga: 4th
- DFB-Pokal: Round of 16
- UEFA Champions League: Group stage (4th)
- Top goalscorer: League: Raffael (13); All: Raffael (15)
Home colours	Away colours	Third colours

The 2015–16 Borussia Mönchengladbach season was the 116th season in the club's history.

== Players ==
=== Squad ===
As of 23 August 2015

Note: Flags indicate national team as defined under FIFA eligibility rules; some limited exceptions apply. Players may hold more than one non-FIFA nationality.

No.	Pos.	Nation	Player
1	GK	SUI	Yann Sommer
3	DF	DEN	Andreas Christensen (on loan from Chelsea)
4	DF	NED	Roel Brouwers
6	MF	NOR	Håvard Nordtveit
7	MF	GER	Patrick Herrmann
8	MF	GER	Mahmoud Dahoud
9	FW	SUI	Josip Drmić
10	FW	BEL	Thorgan Hazard
11	FW	BRA	Raffael
13	FW	GER	Lars Stindl
14	DF	GER	Nico Schulz
15	DF	ESP	Álvaro Domínguez
16	MF	GUI	Ibrahima Traoré

No.	Pos.	Nation	Player
17	DF	SWE	Oscar Wendt
18	MF	GER	Marvin Schulz
19	DF	USA	Fabian Johnson
21	GK	GER	Tobias Sippel
24	DF	GER	Tony Jantschke
27	DF	GER	Julian Korb
28	MF	GER	André Hahn
30	DF	SUI	Nico Elvedi
33	GK	GER	Christofer Heimeroth
34	MF	SUI	Granit Xhaka (captain)
36	FW	GER	Marlon Ritter
39	DF	AUT	Martin Stranzl

=== Transfers ===
==== In ====
No.	Pos.	Nat.	Name	Age	EU	Moving from	Type	Transfer window	Ends	Transfer fee	Source
9	FW	(Switzerland)	Josip Drmić	22	EU	Bayer Leverkusen	Transfer	Summer	2019	€10,000,000	
14	LB	(Germany)	Nico Schulz	22	EU	Hertha BSC	Transfer	Summer	2019	€4,000,000	
10	AM	(Belgium)	Thorgan Hazard	22	EU	Chelsea (England)	Transfer	Summer	2020	€8,000,000	
30	CB	(Switzerland)	Nico Elvedi	18	EU	Zürich (Switzerland)	Transfer	Summer	2019	€4,000,000	
13	FW	(Germany)	Lars Stindl	26	EU	Hannover 96	Transfer	Summer	2020	€3,000,000	
21	GK	(Germany)	Tobias Sippel	27	EU	1. FC Kaiserslautern	Transfer	Summer	2018	Free	
	CF	(Germany)	Peniel Mlapa	24	EU	1. FC Nürnberg	Loan Return	Summer	2017		
	LW	(Germany)	Amin Younes	21	EU	1. FC Kaiserslautern	Loan Return	Summer	2018		
	RM	(Germany)	Jonas Hofmann	22	EU	Borussia Dortmund	Transfer	Winter	2020	€8,000,000	

Total Spending: ▼€37,000,000

==== Out ====
No.	Pos.	Nat.	Name	Age	EU	Moving to	Type	Transfer window	Transfer fee	Source
	ST	(Germany)	Max Kruse	27	EU	VfL Wolfsburg	Transfer	Summer	€12,000,000	
	LW	(Germany)	Amin Younes	21	EU	Ajax (Netherlands)	Transfer	Summer	€2,500,000	
	LB	(Belgium)	Filip Daems	36	EU	Westerlo (Belgium)	Transfer	Summer	Free	
	CF	(Germany)	Peniel Mlapa	24	EU	VfL Bochum	Transfer	Summer	Unknown	
	DM	(Germany)	Thorben Marx	34	EU		Retired	Summer		
	DM	(Germany)	Christoph Kramer	24	EU	Bayer Leverkusen	Loan Return	Summer		
	AM	(Belgium)	Thorgan Hazard	22	EU	Chelsea (England)	Loan Return	Summer		

Total Incoming: ▲€14,500,000

==== Loan in ====
No.	Pos.	Nat.	Name	Age	EU	Moving from	Type	Transfer window	Ends	Transfer fee	Source
	DF	(Denmark)	Andreas Christensen	19	EU	Chelsea (England)	Loan	Summer	2017	Loan	

==== Loan out ====
No.	Pos.	Nat.	Name	Age	EU	Moving to	Type	Transfer window	Transfer fee	Source
	DM	(Germany)	Nico Brandenburger	20	EU	Luzern (Switzerland)	Loan	Summer	Loan	
	GK	(Germany)	Janis Blaswich	24	EU	Dynamo Dresden	Loan	Summer	Loan	

== Competitions ==
Win Draw Loss

=== Bundesliga ===
==== League table ====
Pos	Team	Pld	W	D	L	GF	GA	GD	Pts	Qualification or relegation
2	Borussia Dortmund	34	24	6	4	82	34	+48	78	Qualification for the Champions League group stage
3	Bayer Leverkusen	34	18	6	10	56	40	+16	60	Qualification for the Champions League group stage
4	Borussia Mönchengladbach	34	17	4	13	67	50	+17	55	Qualification for the Champions League play-off round
5	Schalke 04	34	15	7	12	51	49	+2	52	Qualification for the Europa League group stage (Note: Since the winners of the 2015–16 DFB-Pokal, Bayern Munich, qualified for the Champions League based on league position, the Europa League group stage spot was passed to the sixth-placed team, Mainz 05; and the Europa League third qualifying round spot was passed to the seventh-placed team, Hertha BSC.)
6	Mainz 05	34	14	8	12	46	42	+4	50	Qualification for the Europa League group stage

Source: DFB
Rules for classification: 1) Points; 2) Goal difference; 3) Goals scored; 4) Head-to-head points; 5) Head-to-head goal difference; 6) Head-to-head away goals scored; 7) Away goals scored; 8) Play-offs.

==== Results summary ====
Overall								Home						Away					
Pld	W	D	L	GF	GA	GD	Pts	W	D	L	GF	GA	GD	W	D	L	GF	GA	GD
34	17	4	13	67	50	+17	55	13	1	3	42	18	+24	4	3	10	25	32	−7

Last updated: 14 May 2016.
Source: Bundesliga

==== Results by round ====
Round	1	2	3	4	5	6	7	8	9	10	11	12	13	14	15	16	17	18	19	20	21	22	23	24	25	26	27	28	29	30	31	32	33	34
Ground	A	H	A	H	A	H	A	H	A	H	A	H	H	A	H	A	H	H	A	H	A	H	A	H	A	H	A	H	A	A	H	A	H	A
Result	L	L	L	L	L	W	W	W	W	W	W	D	W	D	W	L	W	L	L	W	L	W	D	W	L	W	L	W	L	L	W	D	W	W
Position	17	18	18	18	18	16	14	13	10	7	5	6	5	4	3	5	4	4	6	6	7	5	4	4	6	4	5	4	5	5	5	4	4	4

Updated to match(es) played on 14 May 2016. Source: Bundesliga
A = Away; H = Home; W = Win; D = Draw; L = Loss

==== Matches ====
15 August 2015 1	Borussia Dortmund	4–0	Borussia Mönchengladbach	Dortmund
18:30 CEST (UTC+02:00)	Reus 15'; Aubameyang 21'; Mkhitaryan 33', 50'	Report	Xhaka (yellow card) 77'	Stadium: Signal Iduna Park; Attendance: 81,359; Referee: Tobias Stieler

23 August 2015 2	Borussia Mönchengladbach	1–2	Mainz 05	Mönchengladbach
17:30 CEST (UTC+02:00)	Herrmann 54'; Wendt (yellow card) 78'; Korb (yellow card) 90'	Report	Jairo 42'; Frei (yellow card) 44'; Clemens 79'	Stadium: Stadion im Borussia-Park; Attendance: 50,172; Referee: Deniz Aytekin

30 August 2015 3	Werder Bremen	2–1	Borussia Mönchengladbach	Bremen
17:30 CEST (UTC+02:00)	S. García (yellow card) 30'; Jóhannsson 39' (pen.); Vestergaard 53'; U. Garcia (yellow card) 62'; Wiedwald (yellow card) 90+4'	Report	Xhaka (yellow card) 24' (yellow-red card) 87'; Stindl 45'; Nordtveit (yellow card) 66'	Stadium: Weserstadion; Attendance: 42,100; Referee: Felix Zwayer

11 September 2015 4	Borussia Mönchengladbach	0–3	Hamburger SV	Mönchengladbach
20:30 CEST (UTC+02:00)	Jantschke (yellow card) 58'; Dahoud (yellow card) 88'	Report	Lasogga 11', 44'; Ekdal (yellow card) 35'; N. Müller 52'	Stadium: Stadion im Borussia-Park; Attendance: 54,010; Referee: Tobias Welz

19 September 2015 5	1. FC Köln	1–0	Borussia Mönchengladbach	Cologne
15:30 CEST (UTC+02:00)	Modeste 64'	Report	Xhaka (yellow card) 23'; Hazard (yellow card) 70'; Wendt (yellow card) 78'	Stadium: RheinEnergieSTADION; Attendance: 47,800; Referee: Felix Brych

23 September 2015 6	Borussia Mönchengladbach	4–2	FC Augsburg	Mönchengladbach
20:00 CEST (UTC+02:00)	Johnson 5'; Xhaka 17', (yellow card) 47'; Stindl 19', (yellow card) 53'; Dahoud 21'	Report	Stafylidis (yellow card) 11'; Verhaegh (yellow card) 16', (goal) 51' (pen.), 75' (pen.); Hong (yellow card) 80'; Baier (yellow card) 86'; Ji (yellow card) 90'	Stadium: Stadion im Borussia-Park; Attendance: 40,511; Referee: Daniel Siebert

26 September 2015 7	VfB Stuttgart	1–3	Borussia Mönchengladbach	Stuttgart
15:30 CEST (UTC+02:00)	Baumgartl (yellow card) 16'; Ginczek 40' (pen.); Šunjić (yellow card) 61'; Gentner (yellow card) 64'; Die (yellow card) 88'	Report	Xhaka 16'; Gentner 20' (o.g.); Sommer (yellow card) 78'; Raffael 90'	Stadium: Mercedes-Benz Arena; Attendance: 51,020; Referee: Günter Perl

3 October 2015 8	Borussia Mönchengladbach	2–0	VfL Wolfsburg	Mönchengladbach
15:30 CEST (UTC+02:00)	Xhaka (yellow card) 44'; Johnson (yellow card) 44'; Nordtveit 75'; Traoré 79'	Report	Schäfer (yellow card) 41'; R. Rodríguez (yellow card) 68'; Kruse (yellow card) 77'	Stadium: Stadion im Borussia-Park; Attendance: 52,581; Referee: Felix Zwayer

17 October 2015 9	Eintracht Frankfurt	1–5	Borussia Mönchengladbach	Frankfurt
18:30 CEST (UTC+02:00)	Meier 29' (pen.); Seferovic (yellow card) 62'; Aigner (yellow card) 64'; Djakpa (yellow card) 76'; Russ (yellow card) 82'	Report	Raffael 16', 57'; Sommer (yellow card) 28'; Stindl (yellow card) 31'; Dahoud 51'; Korb (yellow card) 59'; Hahn 82' (pen.), 90'	Stadium: Commerzbank-Arena; Attendance: 50,700; Referee: Florian Meyer

25 October 2015 10	Borussia Mönchengladbach	3–1	Schalke 04	Mönchengladbach
17:30 CET (UTC+01:00)	Stindl 32'; Wendt (yellow card) 52'; Raffael 70', (yellow card) 72'; Korb 84'	Report	Caiçara (yellow card) 27'; Christensen 44' (o.g.); Höwedes (yellow card) 72'; Matip (yellow card) 80'; Geis (red card) 80'	Stadium: Stadion im Borussia-Park; Attendance: 54,010; Referee: Wolfgang Stark

31 October 2015 11	Hertha BSC	1–4	Borussia Mönchengladbach	Berlin
15:30 CET (UTC+01:00)	Langkamp (yellow card) 54'; Stocker (yellow card) 77'; Baumjohann 82' (pen.)	Report	Wendt 26'; Raffael 28'; Xhaka 54' (pen.); Johnson (yellow card) 76'; Nordtveit 90+1'	Stadium: Olympiastadion; Attendance: 58,566; Referee: Peter Sippel

7 November 2015 12	Borussia Mönchengladbach	0–0	FC Ingolstadt	Mönchengladbach
15:30 CET (UTC+01:00)	Xhaka (yellow card) 18' (yellow-red card) 86'; Domínguez (yellow card) 74'	Report	Brégerie (yellow card) 31'; Leckie (yellow card) 37'; Groß (yellow card) 49'; Levels (yellow card) 59'; Engel (yellow card) 67'; Morales (yellow card) 84'	Stadium: Stadion im Borussia-Park; Attendance: 52,331; Referee: Marco Fritz

21 November 2015 13	Borussia Mönchengladbach	2–1	Hannover 96	Mönchengladbach
15:30 CET (UTC+01:00)	Traoré 34'; Wendt (yellow card) 57'; Raffael 84'	Report	Sorg (yellow card) 62'; Sobiech 65'	Stadium: Stadion im Borussia-Park; Attendance: 52,214; Referee: Felix Brych

28 November 2015 14	TSG Hoffenheim	3–3	Borussia Mönchengladbach	Sinsheim
15:30 CET (UTC+01:00)	Amiri (yellow card) 8', (goal) 47'; Zuber 11'; Polanski 34'; Kim (yellow card) 59'	Report	Johnson 5', 87'; Dahoud (yellow card) 25'; Drmić 56'	Stadium: Wirsol Rhein-Neckar-Arena; Attendance: 30,150; Referee: Michael Weiner

5 December 2015 15	Borussia Mönchengladbach	3–1	Bayern Munich	Mönchengladbach
15:30 CET (UTC+01:00)	Wendt 54'; Stindl 66', (yellow card) 74'; Johnson 68'	Report	Benatia (yellow card) 4'; Ribéry 81'; Rafinha (yellow card) 86'	Stadium: Stadion im Borussia-Park; Attendance: 54,010; Referee: Felix Zwayer

12 December 2015 16	Bayer Leverkusen	5–0	Borussia Mönchengladbach	Leverkusen
18:30 CET (UTC+01:00)	Kießling 30', 66'; Hernández 63', 75', 76'	Report	Jantschke (yellow card) 40'; Korb (yellow card) 81'	Stadium: BayArena; Attendance: 30,210; Referee: Tobias Stieler

20 December 2015 17	Borussia Mönchengladbach	3–2	Darmstadt 98	Mönchengladbach
17:30 CET (UTC+01:00)	Xhaka (red card) 38'; Stindl 44', (yellow card) 45+1'; Nordtveit 51'; Wendt 86'	Report	Heller 28', (yellow card) 65'; Niemeyer (yellow card) 38'; Caldirola (yellow card) 45+2'; Holland (yellow card) 60'; Wagner 67'	Stadium: Stadion im Borussia-Park; Attendance: 53,610; Referee: Benjamin Brand

23 January 2016 18	Borussia Mönchengladbach	1–3	Borussia Dortmund	Mönchengladbach
18:30 CET (UTC+01:00)	Raffael 58'; Elvedi (yellow card) 67'	Report	Reus 41'; Mkhitaryan 50'; Weigl (yellow card) 74'; Gündoğan 75'	Stadium: Stadion im Borussia-Park; Attendance: 54,010; Referee: Felix Brych

29 January 2016 19	Mainz 05	1–0	Borussia Mönchengladbach	Mainz
20:30 CET (UTC+01:00)	Clemens 21'	Report	Nordtveit (yellow card) 63'; Korb (yellow card) 80'	Stadium: Coface Arena; Attendance: 32,015; Referee: Benjamin Brand

5 February 2016 20	Borussia Mönchengladbach	5–1	Werder Bremen	Mönchengladbach
20:30 CET (UTC+01:00)	Stindl 12'; Hazard (yellow card) 30'; Christensen 31', 50'; Raffael 70' (pen.); Nordtveit 88'	Report	Pizarro 56' (pen.); Vestergaard (yellow card) 69'; Junuzović (yellow card) 74'	Stadium: Stadion im Borussia-Park; Attendance: 51,569; Referee: Sascha Stegemann

14 February 2016 21	Hamburger SV	3–2	Borussia Mönchengladbach	Hamburg
15:30 CET (UTC+01:00)	Cléber (yellow card) 29'; Hinteregger 38' (o.g.); Rudņevs 41'; Iličević 80'; Drmić (yellow card) 84'; Jung (yellow card) 90+2'	Report	Johnson 14'; Nordtveit (yellow card) 51'; Raffael 88'	Stadium: Volksparkstadion; Attendance: 56,706; Referee: Deniz Aytekin

20 February 2016 22	Borussia Mönchengladbach	1–0	1. FC Köln	Mönchengladbach
15:30 CET (UTC+01:00)	Dahoud 9'; Stindl (yellow card) 46'; Raffael (yellow card) 70'	Report	Maroh (yellow card) 46'; Olkowski (yellow card) 83'; Hosiner (yellow card) 88'	Stadium: Stadion im Borussia-Park; Attendance: 52,226; Referee: Knut Kircher

28 February 2016 23	FC Augsburg	2–2	Borussia Mönchengladbach	Augsburg
15:30 CET (UTC+01:00)	Finnbogason 50'; Caiuby 53'	Report	Raffael 33'; Johnson 55'	Stadium: WWK ARENA; Attendance: 29,665; Referee: Knut Kircher

2 March 2016 24	Borussia Mönchengladbach	4–0	VfB Stuttgart	Mönchengladbach
20:00 CET (UTC+01:00)	Hazard 16', (yellow card) 54'; Raffael 60'; Herrmann 68'; Großkreutz 90+1' (o.g.)	Report	Die (yellow card) 44'; Harnik (yellow card) 83'	Stadium: Stadion im Borussia-Park; Attendance: 43,627; Referee: Tobias Welz

5 March 2016 25	VfL Wolfsburg	2–1	Borussia Mönchengladbach	Wolfsburg
15:30 CET (UTC+01:00)	Draxler 15'; Kruse 17'; Schürrle (yellow card) 45+1'; Guilavogui (yellow card) 70'	Report	Raffael 23'; Dahoud (yellow card) 32'; Christensen (yellow card) 40'; Hazard (yellow card) 73'	Stadium: Volkswagen Arena; Attendance: 29,224; Referee: Daniel Siebert

12 March 2016 26	Borussia Mönchengladbach	3–0	Eintracht Frankfurt	Mönchengladbach
15:30 CET (UTC+01:00)	Stindl 36'; Raffael 53'; Dahoud 79', (yellow card) 87'	Report	Hasebe (yellow card) 36'; Abraham (yellow card) 76'; Huszti (yellow card) 87'	Stadium: Stadion im Borussia-Park; Attendance: 54,010; Referee: Michael Weiner

18 March 2016 27	Schalke 04	2–1	Borussia Mönchengladbach	Gelsenkirchen
20:30 CET (UTC+01:00)	Hinteregger 59' (o.g.); Kolašinac (yellow card) 64'; Goretzka 83'	Report	Christensen 79'	Stadium: Veltins-Arena; Attendance: 62,271; Referee: Marco Fritz

3 April 2016 28	Borussia Mönchengladbach	5–0	Hertha BSC	Mönchengladbach
15:30 CEST (UTC+02:00)	Hazard 14', 80'; Hahn (yellow card) 24', (goal) 60'; Herrmann 76'; Traoré 85'	Report	Kalou (yellow card) 59'; Weiser (yellow card) 74'	Stadium: Stadion im Borussia-Park; Attendance: 53,114; Referee: Sascha Stegemann

9 April 2016 29	FC Ingolstadt	1–0	Borussia Mönchengladbach	Ingolstadt
15:30 CEST (UTC+02:00)	Özcan (yellow card) 71'; Hartmann 87'	Report	Xhaka (yellow card) 29'	Stadium: Audi Sportpark; Attendance: 15,200; Referee: Tobias Welz

15 April 2016 30	Hannover 96	2–0	Borussia Mönchengladbach	Hanover
20:30 CEST (UTC+02:00)	Sané (yellow card) 45+1'; Anton 49'; Schmiedebach (yellow card) 56'; Sobiech 60'	Report		Stadium: HDI-Arena; Attendance: 46,196; Referee: Markus Schmidt

24 April 2016 31	Borussia Mönchengladbach	3–1	TSG Hoffenheim	Mönchengladbach
15:30 CEST (UTC+02:00)	Toljan 7' (o.g.); Dahoud 45'; Hahn 61'; Nordtveit (yellow card) 70'	Report	Rudy (yellow card) 20'; Polanski (yellow card) 40'; Kramarić 54'	Stadium: Stadion im Borussia-Park; Attendance: 53,144; Referee: Robert Hartmann

30 April 2016 32	Bayern Munich	1–1	Borussia Mönchengladbach	Munich
15:30 CEST (UTC+02:00)	Müller 6'; Tasci (yellow card) 18'; Rode (yellow card) 22'	Report	Hahn 72'; Elvedi (yellow card) 77'	Stadium: Allianz Arena; Attendance: 75,000; Referee: Daniel Siebert

7 May 2016 33	Borussia Mönchengladbach	2–1	Bayer Leverkusen	Mönchengladbach
15:30 CEST (UTC+02:00)	Hahn 43', 79'; Wendt (yellow card) 60'; Traoré (yellow card) 76'	Report	Aránguiz 20'; Bender (yellow card) 30'; Jedvaj (yellow card) 88'	Stadium: Stadion im Borussia-Park; Attendance: 54,010; Referee: Bastian Dankert

14 May 2016 34	Darmstadt 98	0–2	Borussia Mönchengladbach	Darmstadt
15:30 CEST (UTC+02:00)	Platte (yellow card) 45'; Garics (yellow card) 52'; Holland (yellow card) 80'	Report	Hazard 31'; Hahn 63'	Stadium: Merck-Stadion am Böllenfalltor; Attendance: 17,000; Referee: Peter Sippel

=== DFB-Pokal ===
10 August 2015 Round 1	FC St. Pauli	1–4	Borussia Mönchengladbach	Hamburg
20:30 CEST (UTC+02:00)	Rzatkowski 33'	Report	Stindl 54', 67'; Traoré 56'; Xhaka (yellow card) 63'; Hazard 86'	Stadium: Millerntor-Stadion; Attendance: 28,175; Referee: Florian Meyer

28 October 2015 Round 2	Schalke 04	0–2	Borussia Mönchengladbach	Gelsenkirchen
20:30 CET (UTC+01:00)	Caiçara (yellow card) 55'; Højbjerg (yellow card) 81'	Report	Wendt (yellow card) 15'; Stindl 42'; Hazard 53' (pen.)	Stadium: Veltins-Arena; Attendance: 60,655; Referee: Tobias Stieler

15 December 2015 Round of 16	Borussia Mönchengladbach	3–4	Werder Bremen	Mönchengladbach
19:15 CET (UTC+01:00)	Stindl 32', (yellow card) 63'; Dahoud (yellow card) 48'; Hrgota 74', 90+3'	Report	Sternberg 51'; Vestergaard 58'; U. Garcia (yellow card) 71'; Pizarro 75'; Ujah 78'	Stadium: Stadion im Borussia-Park; Attendance: 53,106; Referee: Günter Perl

=== UEFA Champions League ===
==== Group stage ====
Pos	Team	Pld	W	D	L	GF	GA	GD	Pts	Qualification	MCI	JUV	SEV	BMG
1	(England) Manchester City	6	4	0	2	12	8	+4	12	Advance to knockout phase	—	1–2	2–1	4–2
2	(Italy) Juventus	6	3	2	1	6	3	+3	11	Advance to knockout phase	1–0	—	2–0	0–0
3	(Spain) Sevilla	6	2	0	4	8	11	−3	6	Transfer to Europa League	1–3	1–0	—	3–0
4	(Germany) Borussia Mönchengladbach	6	1	2	3	8	12	−4	5		1–2	1–1	4–2	—

Source: UEFA
Rules for classification: Group stage tiebreakers

15 September 2015 1	Sevilla (Spain)	3–0	(Germany) Borussia Mönchengladbach	Seville, Spain
20:45 CEST (UTC+02:00)	Gameiro 47' (pen.); Banega 66' (pen.); Reyes (yellow card) 78'; Konoplyanka 84'; Nzonzi (yellow card) 89'	Report	Wendt (yellow card) 49'; Sommer (yellow card) 49'; Stindl (yellow card) 52'	Stadium: Ramón Sánchez-Pizjuán; Attendance: 36,959; Referee: Pavel Královec (Czech Republic)

30 September 2015 2	Borussia Mönchengladbach (Germany)	1–2	(England) Manchester City	Mönchengladbach, Germany
20:45 CEST (UTC+02:00)	Stindl (yellow card) 37', (goal) 54'; Korb (yellow card) 67'; Domínguez (yellow card) 87'	Report	Otamendi (yellow card) 19'; Demichelis 65'; Agüero 90' (pen.)	Stadium: Stadion im Borussia-Park; Attendance: 46,217; Referee: Clément Turpin (France)

21 October 2015 3	Juventus (Italy)	0–0	(Germany) Borussia Mönchengladbach	Turin, Italy
20:45 CEST (UTC+02:00)	Chiellini (yellow card) 90+2'	Report	Domínguez (yellow card) 41'; Wendt (yellow card) 62'; Xhaka (yellow card) 77'	Stadium: Juventus Stadium; Attendance: 40,940; Referee: Craig Thomson (Scotland)

3 November 2015 4	Borussia Mönchengladbach (Germany)	1–1	(Italy) Juventus	Mönchengladbach, Germany
20:45 CET (UTC+01:00)	Johnson 18'	Report	Lichtsteiner 44'; Hernanes (red card) 53'; Marchisio (yellow card) 56'; Dybala (yellow card) 63'; Sturaro (yellow card) 67'	Stadium: Stadion im Borussia-Park; Attendance: 46,217; Referee: Björn Kuipers (Netherlands)

25 November 2015 5	Borussia Mönchengladbach (Germany)	4–2	(Spain) Sevilla	Mönchengladbach, Germany
20:45 CET (UTC+01:00)	Stindl 29', 83'; Dahoud (yellow card) 50'; Johnson 68'; Raffael 78'; Drmić (yellow card) 84'	Report	Banega (yellow card) 34', (goal) 90+1' (pen.); Vitolo 82'	Stadium: Stadion im Borussia-Park; Attendance: 45,177; Referee: Damir Skomina (Slovenia)

8 December 2015 6	Manchester City (England)	4–2	(Germany) Borussia Mönchengladbach	Manchester, England
20:45 CET (UTC+01:00)	Silva 16'; Sterling 79', 81'; Bony 85'	Report	Korb 19'; Raffael 42'	Stadium: Etihad Stadium; Attendance: 41,829; Referee: Danny Makkelie (Netherlands)

== Statistics ==
=== Goalscorers ===
This includes all competitive matches. The list is sorted by shirt number when total goals are equal.

Rank	Pos	No.	Nat	Name	Bundesliga	DFB-Pokal	Champions League	Total
1	FW	11	(Brazil)	Raffael	13	0	2	15
2	MF	13	(Germany)	Lars Stindl	7	4	3	14
3	MF	19	(United States)	Fabian Johnson	6	0	2	8
3	MF	28	(Germany)	André Hahn	8	0	0	8
5	MF	10	(Belgium)	Thorgan Hazard	4	2	0	6
6	MF	8	(Germany)	Mahmoud Dahoud	5	0	0	5
7	MF	6	(Norway)	Håvard Nordtveit	4	0	0	4
7	MF	16	(Guinea)	Ibrahima Traoré	2	2	0	4
9	DF	3	(Denmark)	Andreas Christensen	3	0	0	3
9	MF	7	(Germany)	Patrick Herrmann	3	0	0	3
9	DF	17	(Sweden)	Oscar Wendt	3	0	0	3
9	MF	34	(Switzerland)	Granit Xhaka	3	0	0	3
13	MF	27	(Germany)	Julian Korb	1	0	1	2
13	FW	31	(Sweden)	Branimir Hrgota	0	2	0	2
15	FW	9	(Switzerland)	Josip Drmić	1	0	0	1
15	MF	23	(Germany)	Jonas Hofmann	1	0	0	1
Total					65	9	8	82

Last updated: 14 May 2016
