= 2012–13 Borussia Mönchengladbach season =

Borussia Mönchengladbach
2012–13 season
- Manager: Lucien Favre
- Bundesliga: 8th
- DFB-Pokal: Second round
- UEFA Champions League: Play-off round
- UEFA Europa League: Round of 32
- Top goalscorer: League: Luuk de Jong; Patrick Herrmann (6 each); All: Juan Arango (9)
Home colours	Away colours	Third colours

The 2012–13 Borussia Mönchengladbach season was the 113th season in the club's football history. In 2012–13 the club played in the Bundesliga, the top tier of German football. It was the club's fifth consecutive season in this league, having been promoted from the 2. Bundesliga in 2008.

The club also took part in the 2012–13 edition of the DFB-Pokal, the German Cup, where it reached the second round and lost to fellow Bundesliga side Fortuna Düsseldorf.

In Europe the club qualified for the 2012–13 edition of the UEFA Europa League, where it played AEL Limassol, Fenerbahçe and Marseille in Group C of the group stage. The club had qualified for the play-off round of the 2012–13 UEFA Champions League but was knocked out by Dynamo Kyiv.

== Matches ==
=== Legend ===
Win Draw Loss Postponed

=== Friendly matches ===
11 July 2012	SSVg Velbert	0–6	Borussia Mönchengladbach	Velbert
18:30 CEST			Ciğerci 19'; Hrgota 25'; Own goal 26'; Own goal 50'; De Camargo 61'; Herrmann 79'	Stadium: Stadion Sonnenblume; Attendance: 3,517; Referee: Felix Schmitz (Xanten)

14 July 2012	Preußen Münster	0–3	Borussia Mönchengladbach	Ahaus
16:00 CEST			De Camargo 30' (pen.); Marx 41'; Hrgota 85'	Stadium: Stadion am Bahnhof, Alstätte

21 July 2012	Borussia Mönchengladbach	2–2	Birmingham City	Munich
16:00 CEST	Zimmermann 75'; Marx 89'		Davies 51'; Asante 81'	Stadium: ESV Munich's Sports Park

25 July 2012	1860 Munich	2–4	Borussia Mönchengladbach	Rottach-Egern
18:00 CEST	Bülow 23'; Blanco 49'		Younes 52'; De Camargo 66', 82'; Bieler 88'

28 July 2012	VfL Bochum	1–4	Borussia Mönchengladbach	Bochum
17:30 CEST	Sinkiewicz 14'		Arango 6', 39', 43'; Mlapa 67'	Stadium: rewirpowerSTADION; Attendance: 10,200; Referee: Thorsten Kinhöfer (Herne)

4 August 2012	Borussia Mönchengladbach	0–0	Sevilla	Mönchengladbach
15:30 CEST				Stadium: Borussia-Park; Attendance: 26.039; Referee: Christian Bandurski

=== Bundesliga ===
==== League table ====
Pos	Team	Pld	W	D	L	GF	GA	GD	Pts	Qualification or relegation
6	Eintracht Frankfurt	34	14	9	11	49	46	+3	51	Qualification for the Europa League play-off round
7	Hamburger SV	34	14	6	14	42	53	−11	48	
8	Borussia Mönchengladbach	34	12	11	11	45	49	−4	47	
9	Hannover 96	34	13	6	15	60	62	−2	45	
10	1. FC Nürnberg	34	11	11	12	39	47	−8	44	

Source: Bundesliga.de, kicker.de
Rules for classification: 1) points; 2) goal difference; 3) number of goals scored.

==== Matches ====
25 August 2012 1	Borussia Mönchengladbach	2–1	1899 Hoffenheim	Mönchengladbach
15:30 CEST	Jantschke (yellow card) 22'; Hanke 33'; Arango 78'; Xhaka (yellow card) 88'	Report	Firmino 66'	Stadium: Borussia-Park; Attendance: 50,100; Referee: Peter Sippel

1 September 2012 2	Fortuna Düsseldorf	0–0	Borussia Mönchengladbach	Düsseldorf
18:30 CEST	Bellinghausen (yellow card) 26'; Kruse (yellow card) 45'; Schahin (yellow card) 86'	Report	Xhaka (yellow card) 58'; Ter Stegen (yellow card) 86'	Stadium: Esprit Arena; Attendance: 29,999; Referee: Günter Perl

15 September 2012 3	Borussia Mönchengladbach	2–3	1. FC Nürnberg	Mönchengladbach
15:30 CEST	Daems (yellow card) 28'; De Jong 45'; Xhaka 53'; Arango (yellow card) 89'	Report	Klose 17'; Simons 26'; Balitsch (yellow card) 28'; Kiyotake 55'; Simons (yellow card) 65'	Stadium: Borussia-Park; Attendance: 52,195; Referee: Christian Dingert

23 September 2012 4	Bayer Leverkusen	1–1	Borussia Mönchengladbach	Leverkusen
15:30 CEST	Kadlec 12'	Report	Herrmann 3'; Stranzl (yellow card) 54'; Ciğerci (yellow card) 56'; Xhaka (yellow card) 62'; Brouwers (yellow card) 69'	Stadium: BayArena; Attendance: 27,640; Referee: Peter Gagelmann

26 September 2012 5	Borussia Mönchengladbach	2–2	Hamburger SV	Mönchengladbach
20:00 CEST	Stranzl 39', (red card) 53'; Xhaka (yellow card) 63'; Domínguez 90', (yellow card) 90+2'	Report	Van der Vaart 23'; Arslan (yellow card) 35'; Rudņevs 45'	Stadium: Borussia-Park; Attendance: 46,233; Referee: Deniz Aytekin

29 September 2012 6	Borussia Dortmund	5–0	Borussia Mönchengladbach	Dortmund
18:30 CEST	Reus 35', 70'; Subotić 40'; Gündoğan 79'; Błaszczykowski 85'	Report (in German)	Nordtveit (yellow card) 90'	Stadium: Signal Iduna Park; Attendance: 80,645; Referee: Wolfgang Stark

7 October 2012 7	Borussia Mönchengladbach	2–0	Eintracht Frankfurt	Mönchengladbach
15:30 CEST	Arango 8'; De Jong 24', (yellow card) 78'; Domínguez (yellow card) 61'; Marx (yellow card) 89'; Rupp (yellow card) 90+1'	Report (in German)		Stadium: Borussia-Park; Attendance: 51,193; Referee: Marco Fritz

20 October 2012 8	Werder Bremen	4–0	Borussia Mönchengladbach	Bremen
18:30 CEST	Petersen 37'; Arnautović 45'; De Bruyne (yellow card) 54'; Füllkrug 76'; Junuzović 86'	Report (in German)	Nordtveit (yellow card) 59'; Jantschke (yellow card) 60'	Stadium: Weserstadion; Attendance: 42,100; Referee: Günther Perl

28 October 2012 9	Hannover 96	2–3	Borussia Mönchengladbach	Hannover
17:30 CEST	Schlaudraff 48'; Diouf 53'; Sakai (yellow card) 56'; Haggui (yellow card) 68'	Report (in German)	Stranzl (yellow card) 52'; Domínguez 70'; Brouwers 77'; Arango 79'	Stadium: AWD-Arena; Attendance: 49,000; Referee: Thorsten Kinhöfer

3 November 2012 10	Borussia Mönchengladbach	1–1	SC Freiburg	Mönchengladbach
15:30 CET	Stranzl (yellow card) 9'; De Camargo 49'	Report (in German)	Caligiuri 77' (pen.)	Stadium: Borussia-Park; Attendance: 47,673; Referee: Wolfgang Stark

11 November 2012 11	Greuther Fürth	2–4	Borussia Mönchengladbach	Fürth
17:30 CET	Nehrig 10' (pen.); Kleine (red card) 12'; Prib 43'; Peković (yellow card) 78' (yellow-red card) 90+1'; Mavraj (yellow card) 81'	Report (in German)	Wendt 22'; Stranzl 51'; Herrmann 57'; Marx 90+2' (pen.)	Stadium: Trolli Arena; Attendance: 18,000; Referee: Peter Gagelmann

17 November 2012 12	Borussia Mönchengladbach	1–2	VfB Stuttgart	Mönchengladbach
15:30 CET	Stranzl 7'; Marx (yellow card) 81'; De Camargo (yellow card) 82'; Domínguez (yellow card) 90+3'	Report (in German)	Harnik 8'; Tasci (yellow card) 44'; Traoré (yellow card) 66'; Kuzmanović (yellow card) 67'; Brouwers 72' (o.g.); Okazaki (yellow card) 77'	Stadium: Borussia-Park; Attendance: 52,150; Referee: Michael Weiner

25 November 2012 13	FC Augsburg	1–1	Borussia Mönchengladbach	Augsburg
17:30 CET	Mölders 5'; Koo (yellow card) 39'	Summary	Stranzl (yellow card) 51'; Jantschke (yellow card) 74'; Herrmann 85'	Stadium: SGL arena Attendance: 30,045; Referee: Tobias Stieler

28 November 2012 14	Borussia Mönchengladbach	2–0	VfL Wolfsburg	Mönchengladbach
20:30 CET	Arango 11'; Jantschke (yellow card) 38', (goal) 44'	Summary	Polák (yellow card) 65'; Jönsson (yellow card) 90+3'	Stadium: Borussia-Park; Attendance: 40,165; Referee: Robert Hartmann

1 December 2012 15	Schalke 04	1–1	Borussia Mönchengladbach	Gelsenkirchen
15:30 CET	Draxler (yellow card) 35', (goal) 85'	Summary	Nordtveit (yellow card) 1'; De Camargo 62'; Herrmann (yellow card) 75'; Domínguez (yellow card) 87'	Stadium: Veltins-Arena; Attendance: 61,673; Referee: Felix Brych

9 December 2012 16	Borussia Mönchengladbach	2–0	Mainz 05	Mönchengladbach
15:30 CET	Hanke 58'; Arango 63'; Herrmann (yellow card) 77'; Domínguez (yellow card) 86'	Summary	Soto (yellow card) 45'; Noveski (yellow card) 83'	Stadium: Borussia-Park; Attendance: 46,622; Referee: Thorsten Kinhöfer

14 December 2012 17	Bayern Munich	1–1	Borussia Mönchengladbach	Munich
20:30 CET	Dante (yellow card) 56'; Shaqiri 59'	Report (in German)	Marx 21'; Nordtveit (yellow card) 26'; Ciğerci (yellow card) 70'	Stadium: Allianz Arena; Attendance: 71,000; Referee: Tobias Welz

19 January 2013 18	1899 Hoffenheim	0–0	Borussia Mönchengladbach	Sinsheim
15:30 CET	Vestergaard (yellow card) 30'; Weis (yellow card) 52'; Usami (yellow card) 71'	Summary	Brouwers (yellow card) 42'; Herrmann (yellow card) 87'	Stadium: Rhein-Neckar Arena; Attendance: 26,750; Referee: Peter Sippel

26 January 2013 19	Borussia Mönchengladbach	2–1	Fortuna Düsseldorf	Mönchengladbach
15:30 CET	Juanan 6' (o.g.); Herrmann 14'; Marx (yellow card) 39'	Summary	Schahin 50' (pen.)	Stadium: Borussia-Park; Attendance: 50,315; Referee: Peter Gagelmann

3 February 2013 20	1. FC Nürnberg	2–1	Borussia Mönchengladbach	Nuremberg
15:30 CET	Simons 4' (pen.); Pekhart 30'; Pinola (yellow card) 80'; Mak (yellow card) 88'	Summary	Wendt (yellow card) 11'; Herrmann 58', (yellow card) 90+1'; Jantschke (yellow card) 83'	Stadium: Frankenstadion; Attendance: 37,793; Referee: Florian Meyer

9 February 2013 21	Borussia Mönchengladbach	3–3	Bayer Leverkusen	Mönchengladbach
15:30 CET	Stranzl 44'; De Jong 58'; Herrmann 86'	Summary	Sam (yellow card) 40', (goal) 52'; Kießling 60'; Schürrle 64'	Stadium: Borussia-Park; Attendance: 46,010; Referee: Knut Kircher

16 February 2013 22	Hamburger SV	1–0	Borussia Mönchengladbach	Hamburg
15:30 CET	Van der Vaart 24'; Badelj (yellow card) 61'	Summary	Herrmann (yellow card) 74'	Stadium: Imtech Arena; Attendance: 54,558; Referee: Robert Hartmann

24 February 2013 23	Borussia Mönchengladbach	1–1	Borussia Dortmund	Mönchengladbach
15:30 CET	Marx (yellow card) 26'; Ter Stegen (yellow card) 30'; Younes 67'; Jantschke (yellow card) 88'	Summary	Götze 31' (pen.); Santana (yellow card) 90'	Stadium: Borussia-Park; Attendance: 54,010; Referee: Günter Perl

1 March 2013 24	Eintracht Frankfurt	0–1	Borussia Mönchengladbach	Frankfurt
20:30 CET	Zambrano (yellow card) 31'; Anderson Bamba (yellow card) 52'; Rode (yellow card) 83'; Schwegler (yellow card) 90+1'	Report	De Jong 22', (yellow card) 70'; Marx (yellow card) 82'	Stadium: Commerzbank-Arena; Attendance: 51,500; Referee: Deniz Aytekin

9 March 2013 25	Borussia Mönchengladbach	1–1	Werder Bremen	Mönchengladbach
18:30 CET	Domínguez (yellow card) 42'; Mlapa 72'	Report	Ignjovski 77'	Stadium: Borussia-Park; Attendance: 54,010; Referee: Wolfgang Stark

17 March 2013 26	Borussia Mönchengladbach	1–0	Hannover 96	Mönchengladbach
17:30 CET	De Jong 36'; Arango (yellow card) 39'	Report	Abdellaoue (yellow card) 3'; Diouf (yellow card) 67'; Pinto (yellow card) 76' (yellow-red card) 85'; Chahed (yellow card) 90+3'; Pander (yellow card) 90+4'	Stadium: Borussia-Park; Attendance: 46,173; Referee: Manuel Gräfe

30 March 2013 27	SC Freiburg	2–0	Borussia Mönchengladbach	Freiburg im Breisgau
15:30 CET	Caligiuri (yellow card) 40'; Kruse 69', 90+2'	Report	Daems (yellow card) 27'; Stranzl (yellow card) 42'	Stadium: Mage Solar Stadion; Attendance: 24,000; Referee: Günter Perl

6 April 2013 28	Borussia Mönchengladbach	1–0	Greuther Fürth	Mönchengladbach
15:30 CEST	De Jong 74'	Report	Zimmermann (yellow card) 61' (yellow-red card) 66'; Sobiech (yellow card) 78'; Azemi (yellow card) 90+1'	Stadium: Borussia-Park; Attendance: 50,206; Referee: Bastian Dankert

14 April 2013 29	VfB Stuttgart	2–0	Borussia Mönchengladbach	Stuttgart
15:30 CEST	Domínguez 28' (o.g.); Gentner 34'	Report		Stadium: Mercedes-Benz Arena; Attendance: 53,430; Referee: Wolfgang Stark

19 April 2013 30	Borussia Mönchengladbach	1–0	FC Augsburg	Mönchengladbach
20:30 CEST	Daems (yellow card) 16', (goal) 28' (pen.); Herrmann (yellow card) 49'; Marx (yellow card) 52'; Domínguez (yellow card) 74'	Report	Vogt (red card) 26'; Verhaegh (yellow card) 54'	Stadium: Borussia-Park; Attendance: 50,175; Referee: Jochen Drees

27 April 2013 31	VfL Wolfsburg	3–1	Borussia Mönchengladbach	Wolfsburg
15:30 CEST	Arnold 34'; Olić 61'; Diego 75'	Report	Mlapa 52'; De Jong (yellow card) 83'	Stadium: Volkswagen Arena; Attendance: 30,000; Referee: Tobias Stieler

3 May 2013 32	Borussia Mönchengladbach	0–1	Schalke 04	Mönchengladbach
20:30 CEST	Daems (yellow card) 10'; Domínguez (yellow card) 29'	Report	Jones (yellow card) 42'; Draxler (yellow card) 68', (goal) 82'; Huntelaar (yellow card) 73'	Stadium: Borussia-Park; Attendance: 54,010; Referee: Florian Meyer

11 May 2013 33	Mainz 05	2–4	Borussia Mönchengladbach	Mainz
15:30 CEST	Parker 12'; Svensson (yellow card) 39'; Ivanschitz 90+1' (pen.)	Report	Hrgota 39' (pen.), 58', 80'; Hanke 64'	Stadium: Coface Arena; Attendance: 34,000; Referee: Felix Brych

18 May 2013 34	Borussia Mönchengladbach	3–4	Bayern Munich	Mönchengladbach
15:30 CEST	Stranzl 4'; Hanke 5'; Nordtveit 10'	Report	Martínez 7'; Ribéry 18', 53'; Robben 59'	Stadium: Borussia-Park; Attendance: 54,010; Referee: Thorsten Kinhöfer

=== DFB-Pokal ===
Round	Date	Time	Venue	City	Opponent	Result	Attendance	Borussia goalscorers	Source
1	18 August 2012	15:30	New Tivoli	Aachen	Alemannia Aachen	2 – 0	31,736	Arango 70'; Nordtveit 90'	
2	31 October 2012	20:30	Esprit Arena	Düsseldorf	Fortuna Düsseldorf	0 – 1	54,000		

=== Europe ===
==== UEFA Champions League ====
===== Playoff round =====
21 August 2012 1st Leg	Borussia Mönchengladbach	1–3	Dynamo Kyiv	Mönchengladbach, Germany
20:45 CEST	Ring 13'; Herrmann (yellow card) 89'	Report	Mykhalyk 28'; Yarmolenko 36'; De Jong 81' (o.g.); Taiwo (yellow card) 83'	Stadium: Borussia-Park; Attendance: 45,075; Referee: Pedro Proença (Portugal)

29 August 2012 2nd Leg	Dynamo Kyiv	1–2 (4–3 agg.)	Borussia Mönchengladbach	Kyiv, Ukraine
20:45 EEST	Vukojević (yellow card) 65'; Ideye 88'	Report	Brouwers (yellow card) 69'; Khacheridi 70' (o.g.); Arango 78'; Nordtveit (yellow card) 90+3'	Stadium: Olympic Stadium; Referee: Craig Thomson (Scotland)

==== UEFA Europa League ====
===== Group stage =====
Pos	Team	Pld	W	D	L	GF	GA	GD	Pts	Qualification
1	(Turkey) Fenerbahçe	6	4	1	1	10	7	+3	13	Advance to knockout phase
2	(Germany) Borussia Mönchengladbach	6	3	2	1	11	6	+5	11	Advance to knockout phase
3	(France) Marseille	6	1	2	3	9	11	−2	5	
4	(Cyprus) AEL Limassol	6	1	1	4	4	10	−6	4	

Match	Date	Time	Venue	City	Opponent	Result	Attendance	Borussia goalscorers	Source
1	20 September 2012	19:00	GSP Stadium	Nicosia, Cyprus	AEL Limassol	0 – 0			
2	4 October 2012	21:05	Borussia-Park	Mönchengladbach, Germany	Fenerbahçe	2 – 4			
3	25 October 2012	21:05	Borussia-Park	Mönchengladbach, Germany	Marseille	2 – 0			
4	8 November 2012	21:05	Stade Vélodrome	Marseille, France	Marseille	2 – 2			
5	22 November 2012	19:00	Borussia-Park	Mönchengladbach, Germany	AEL Limassol	2 – 0			
6	6 December 2012	19:00	Şükrü Saracoğlu Stadium	Istanbul, Turkey	Fenerbahçe	3 – 0			

===== Knockout phase =====
====== Round of 32 ======
14 February 2013 First leg	Borussia Mönchengladbach	3–3	(Italy) Lazio	Mönchengladbach, Germany
21:05 CET	Stranzl 17' (pen.); Marx 84' (pen.); Arango 88', (yellow card) 90+1'	Report	Dias (yellow card) 22' (yellow-red card) 69'; González (yellow card) 40'; Floccari 57'; Kozák 64', 90+4', (yellow card) 83'; Cana (yellow card) 83'	Stadium: Borussia-Park; Attendance: Sergei Karasev (Russia)

21 February 2013 Second leg	Lazio (Italy)	2–0	Borussia Mönchengladbach	Rome, Italy
19:00 CET	Candreva 10'; González 33'	Report	Younes (yellow card) 77'	Stadium: Stadio Olimpico; Referee: Hüseyin Göçek (Turkey)

== Squad ==
=== Squad and statistics ===
==== Squad, appearances and goals ====
As of 31 August 2012

No.	Pos	Nat	Player	Total		Bundesliga		DFB-Pokal		Champions League		Europa League	
No.	Pos	Nat	Player	Apps	Goals	Apps	Goals	Apps	Goals	Apps	Goals	Apps	Goals
Goalkeepers
1	GK	(Germany) GER	Marc-André ter Stegen	4	0	1	0	1	0	2	0	0	0
21	GK	(Germany) GER	Janis Blaswich	0	0	0	0	0	0	0	0	0	0
33	GK	(Germany) GER	Christofer Heimeroth	0	0	0	0	0	0	0	0	0	0
Defenders
2	DF	(Germany) GER	Matthias Zimmermann	0	0	0	0	0	0	0	0	0	0
3	DF	(Belgium) BEL	Filip Daems	4	0	1	0	1	0	2	0	0	0
4	DF	(Netherlands) NED	Roel Brouwers	1	0	1	0	0	0	0	0	0	0
15	DF	(Spain) ESP	Álvaro Domínguez	2	0	0	0	1	0	1	0	0	0
17	DF	(Sweden) SWE	Oscar Wendt	1	0	0	0	1	0	0	0	0	0
24	DF	(Germany) GER	Tony Jantschke	4	0	1	0	1	0	2	0	0	0
37	DF	(Germany) GER	Niklas Dams	0	0	0	0	0	0	0	0	0	0
39	DF	(Austria) AUT	Martin Stranzl	3	0	1	0	1	0	1	0	0	0
Midfielders
5	MF	(Finland) FIN	Alexander Ring	4	1	1	0	1	0	2	1	0	0
6	MF	(Germany) GER	Tolga Ciğerci	1	0	0	0	0	0	1	0	0	0
7	MF	(Germany) GER	Patrick Herrmann	4	0	1	0	1	0	2	0	0	0
8	MF	(Germany) GER	Lukas Rupp	0	0	0	0	0	0	0	0	0	0
14	MF	(Germany) GER	Thorben Marx	0	0	0	0	0	0	0	0	0	0
16	MF	(Norway) NOR	Håvard Nordtveit	4	1	1	0	1	1	2	0	0	0
18	MF	(Venezuela) VEN	Juan Arango	4	3	1	1	1	1	2	1	0	0
23	MF	(Japan) JPN	Yuki Otsu	0	0	0	0	0	0	0	0	0	0
25	MF	(Germany) GER	Amin Younes	0	0	0	0	0	0	0	0	0	0
27	MF	(Germany) GER	Julian Korb	0	0	0	0	0	0	0	0	0	0
30	MF	(Germany) GER	Alexander Bieler	0	0	0	0	0	0	0	0	0	0
34	MF	(Switzerland) SUI	Granit Xhaka	4	0	1	0	1	0	2	0	0	0
Strikers
9	FW	(Netherlands) NED	Luuk de Jong	4	0	1	0	1	0	2	0	0	0
10	FW	(Belgium) BEL	Igor de Camargo	4	0	1	0	1	0	2	0	0	0
19	FW	(Germany) GER	Mike Hanke	4	1	1	1	1	0	2	0	0	0
22	FW	(Germany) GER	Peniel Mlapa	0	0	0	0	0	0	0	0	0	0
31	FW	(Sweden) SWE	Branimir Hrgota	2	0	1	0	0	0	1	0	0	0

=== Transfers ===
==== In ====
No.	Pos.	Nat.	Name	Age	EU	Moving from	Type	Transfer window	Ends	Transfer fee	Source
34	MF	(Switzerland)	Granit Xhaka	19		Basel (Switzerland)	Transfer	Summer	2017	€ 8.5M	
	FW	(Germany)	Peniel Mlapa	21	EU	1899 Hoffenheim	Transfer	Summer	2016	Undisclosed	
	DF	(Germany)	Tobias Levels	25	EU	Fortuna Düsseldorf		Summer	End of loan		
	ST	(Sweden)	Branimir Hrgota	19	EU	Jönköpings Södra IF		Summer	2017	undisclosed	
9	ST	(Netherlands)	Luuk de Jong	21	EU	Twente		Summer	2017	€ 15M	

==== Out ====
No.	Pos.	Nat.	Name	Age	EU	Moving to	Type	Transfer window	Transfer fee	Source
11	MF	(Germany)	Marco Reus	23	EU	Borussia Dortmund	Transfer	Summer	€17.5M	
13	MF	(Germany)	Roman Neustädter	24	EU	Schalke 04	End of contract	Summer	Free	
31	DF	(Brazil)	Dante	28		Bayern Munich	Transfer	Summer	€ 4.5M	

== Kits ==
Home	Home Alternate	Away	Europa	Europa Alt.
