= Christofer Heimeroth =

German footballer (born 1981)

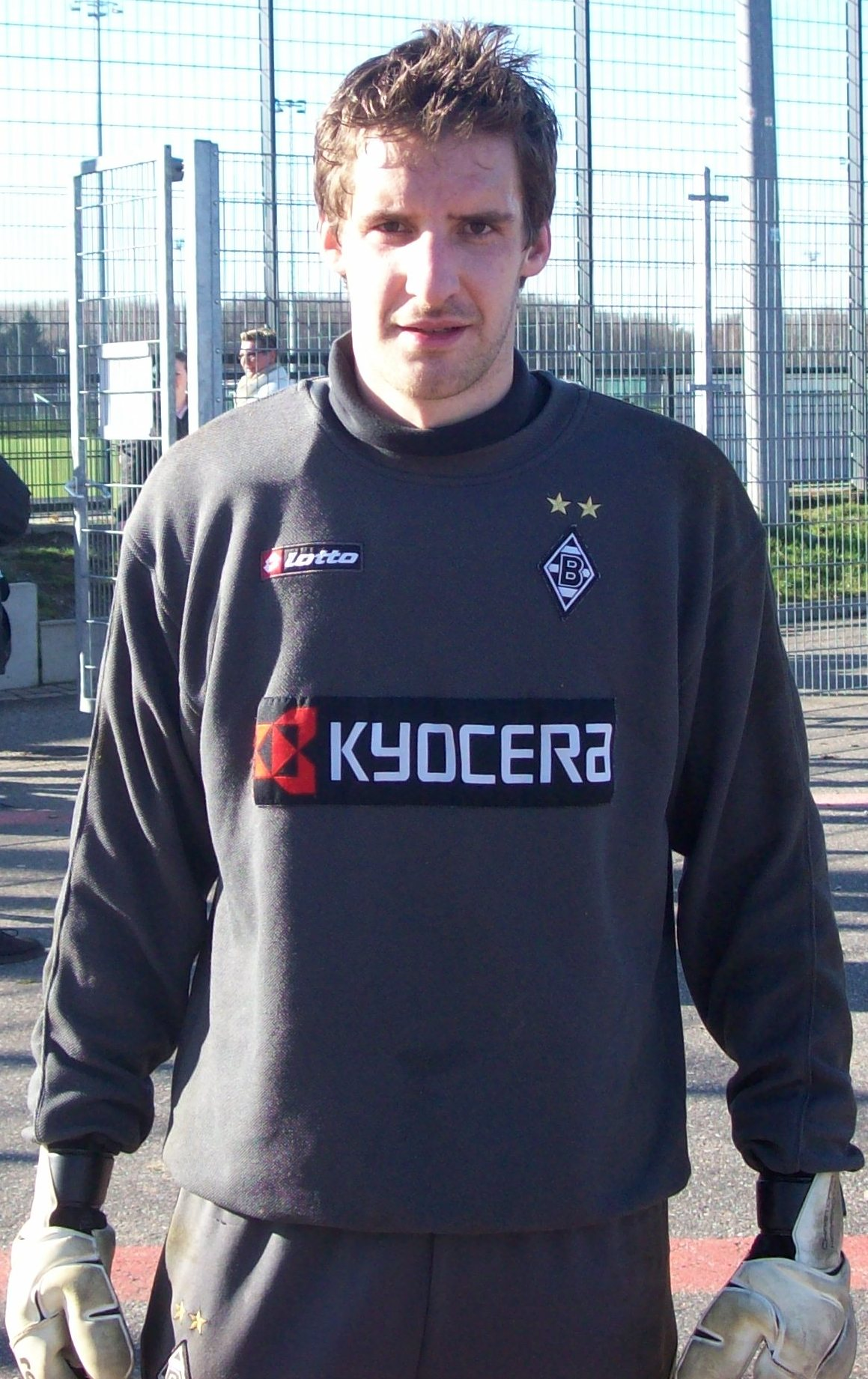
- Heimeroth with Borussia Mönchengladbach in 2008

Personal information
- Full name: Christofer Heimeroth
- Date of birth: 1 August 1981 (age 45)
- Place of birth: Unna, West Germany
- Height: 1.94 m (6 ft 4 in)
- Position: Goalkeeper

Youth career
- 1989–1995: SG Massen
- 1995–1996: BSV Menden
- 1996–1997: Borussia Dortmund
- 1997–1999: SF Oestrich-Iserlohn
- 1999–2000: Schalke 04

Senior career*
Years	Team	Apps	(Gls)
2000–2005	Schalke 04 II	85	(0)
2004–2006	Schalke 04	8	(0)
2006–2016	Borussia Mönchengladbach II	8	(0)
2006–2018	Borussia Mönchengladbach	68	(0)
Total		169	(0)

International career
2002–2003	Germany U-21	4	(0)
- * Club domestic league appearances and goals

Christofer Heimeroth (born 1 August 1981 in Unna, West Germany) is a German former professional footballer who played as a goalkeeper.

== Career statistics ==
Appearances and goals by club, season and competition
Club	Season	League			National cup		Continental		Other		Total	
Club	Season	Division	Apps	Goals	Apps	Goals	Apps	Goals	Apps	Goals	Apps	Goals
Schalke 04 II	2000–01	NOFV-Oberliga	14	0	—		—		1	0	15	0
Schalke 04 II	2001–02	NOFV-Oberliga	32	0	1	0	—		—		33	0
Schalke 04 II	2002–03	NOFV-Oberliga	23	0	—		—		—		23	0
Schalke 04 II	2003–04	Regionalliga Nord	11	0	—		—		—		1	0
Schalke 04 II	2004–05	NOFV-Oberliga	5	0	—		—		—		5	0
Schalke 04 II	Total		85	0	1	0	—		1	0	87	0
Schalke 04	2002–03	Bundesliga	0	0	0	0	—		—		0	0
Schalke 04	2003–04	Bundesliga	3	0	0	0	0	0	—		3	0
Schalke 04	2004–05	Bundesliga	3	0	1	0	0	0	—		4	0
Schalke 04	2005–06	Bundesliga	2	0	0	0	0	0	—		2	0
Schalke 04	Total		8	0	1	0	0	0	—		9	0
Borussia Mönchengladbach II	2006–07	Regionalliga Nord	4	0	—		—		—		4	0
Borussia Mönchengladbach II	2012–13	Regionalliga West	1	0	—		—		—		1	0
Borussia Mönchengladbach II	2016–17	Regionalliga West	3	0	—		—		—		3	0
Borussia Mönchengladbach II	Total		8	0	—		—		—		8	0
Borussia Mönchengladbach	2006–07	Bundesliga	7	0	2	0	—		—		9	0
Borussia Mönchengladbach	2007–08	2. Bundesliga	33	0	2	0	—		—		35	0
Borussia Mönchengladbach	2008–09	Bundesliga	9	0	2	0	—		—		11	0
Borussia Mönchengladbach	2009–10	Bundesliga	5	0	1	0	—		—		6	0
Borussia Mönchengladbach	2010–11	Bundesliga	13	0	3	0	—		0	0	16	0
Borussia Mönchengladbach	2011–12	Bundesliga	0	0	0	0	—		—		0	0
Borussia Mönchengladbach	2012–13	Bundesliga	1	0	0	0	1	0	—		2	0
Borussia Mönchengladbach	2013–14	Bundesliga	0	0	0	0	0	0	—		0	0
Borussia Mönchengladbach	2014–15	Bundesliga	0	0	0	0	0	0	—		0	0
Borussia Mönchengladbach	2015–16	Bundesliga	0	0	0	0	0	0	—		0	0
Borussia Mönchengladbach	2016–17	Bundesliga	0	0	0	0	0	0	—		0	0
Borussia Mönchengladbach	2017–18	Bundesliga	0	0	0	0	—		—		0	0
Borussia Mönchengladbach	Total		68	0	10	0	1	0	0	0	79	0
Career total			169	0	12	0	1	0	1	0	183	0

== Honours ==
=== Club ===
Schalke 04

- DFB-Pokal Runner-up: 2004–05
- UEFA Intertoto Cup: 2003, 2004
