= Håvard Nordtveit =

Norwegian footballer (born 1990)

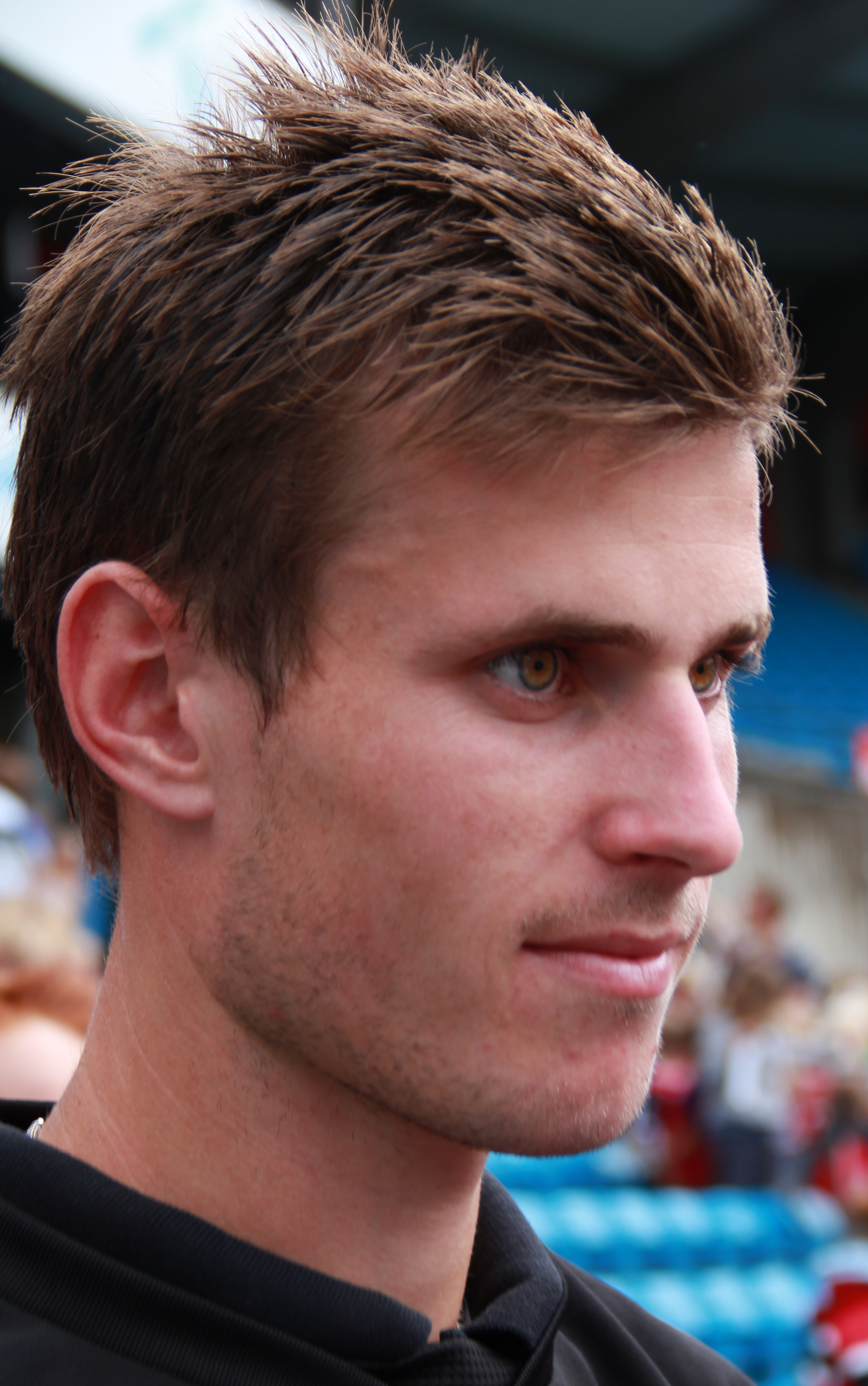
- Nordtveit in 2012

Personal information
- Full name: Håvard Nordtveit
- Date of birth: 21 June 1990 (age 36)
- Place of birth: Vats, Norway
- Height: 1.88 m (6 ft 2 in)
- Positions: Defender; defensive midfielder

Youth career
- 1997–2003: Vats 94
- 2003–2005: Skjold IL
- 2006: Haugesund

Senior career*
Years	Team	Apps	(Gls)
2006–2007	Haugesund	10	(0)
2007–2011	Arsenal	0	(0)
2008	→ Salamanca (loan)	3	(0)
2009	→ Lillestrøm (loan)	17	(0)
2009–2010	→ 1. FC Nürnberg (loan)	19	(0)
2011–2016	Borussia Mönchengladbach	152	(10)
2016–2017	West Ham United	16	(0)
2017–2022	TSG Hoffenheim	57	(0)
2019	→ Fulham (loan)	5	(0)
2023	Skjold IL	1	(0)
Total		280	(10)

International career
2006	Norway U16	10	(1)
2007	Norway U17	7	(0)
2007–2008	Norway U18	4	(3)
2007–2009	Norway U19	14	(0)
2008–2013	Norway U21	24	(1)
2011–2019	Norway	52	(2)
- * Club domestic league appearances and goals

Håvard Nordtveit (born 21 June 1990) is a Norwegian former professional footballer who played as a defender or defensive midfielder.

== Club career ==
=== Norway ===
Nordtveit began his career as a youth in Norway with Vats 94 (where his father, Øyvind Nordtveit, trained him) and Skjold IL before joining Haugesund. It was announced on 29 June 2006 that he signed his first professional contract with the club, keeping him until 2009. As Nordtveit made a transfer move, both Vats 94 and Skjold received an entitlement share of the money.

By August 2006, Nordtveit was called up to the first team for the first time. On 20 August 2006, Nordtveit became the youngest player ever to play for Haugesund, as he was selected for the starting line-up in a 2–0 victory against Sogndal at Haugesund Stadium. This turns out to be his only appearance of the 2006 season.

Nordtveit made nine league appearances during the following season for Haugesund in the Norwegian First Division. That season he also appeared in the Norwegian Football Cup, being in the starting line up in the 1–6 victory against Djerv 1919 (1st round), and coming on in the 33rd minute in a 4–0 victory over Løv-Ham scoring one goal (third round). Haugesund went all the way to the final.

=== Arsenal ===
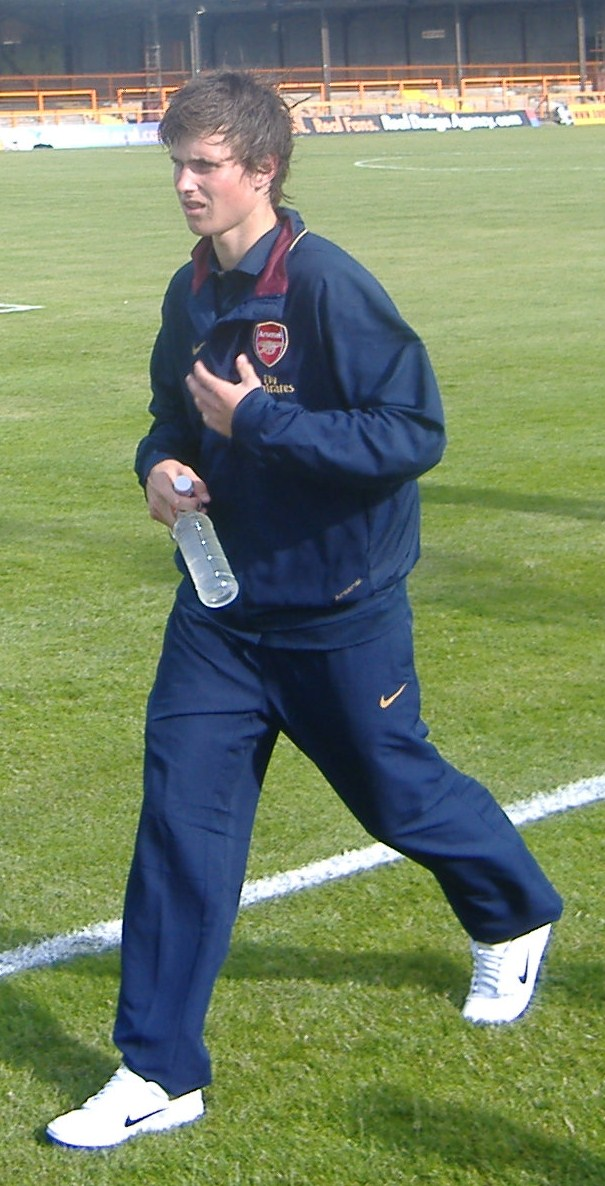
Nordtveit pictured finishing his training session during his time at Arsenal

Arsène Wenger travelled to Norway on 11 June 2007 to watch an Adeccoligaen match and begin negotiations to sign Nordtveit. The members of the FKH board stated that the club had rejected Arsenal's initial bid. The player himself said that his club was asking for a "supernaturally high" transfer fee. The price being quoted in the Norwegian media was 20 million Norwegian kroner (approximately £1.7 million at the time). A transfer fee was later finalized on 3 July 2007 for £500,000 initially, rising to £2m after 40 first team appearances. Upon joining the club, Haugesund captain Kevin Nicol and former Norway coach Nils Johan Semb went on to praise him as the brightest defensive talent in Europe.

Nordtveit made his Arsenal debut in their first pre-season friendly against Barnet on 14 July 2007, coming on after half-time, replacing Kerrea Gilbert, as they won 2–0. He was named captain of Arsenal's reserve squad for the first match of the 2007–08 FA Premier Reserve League season. In an interview with Arsenal.com, Nordtveit said he was "honoured" to have been named captain, and that he hoped to continue in that role in the future. However, he was plagued with injuries for most of the season. In the final game of the 2007–08 season, Nordtveit was named on the substitutes' bench in Arsenal's 1–0 win over Sunderland.

On 21 January 2009, Nordtveit finally made his first appearance for the reserves since spending time on-loan at UD Salamanca, in a 2–2 draw against the Stoke City reserves. Following his loan spell at 1. FC Nürnberg came to an end, Nordtveit returned to Arsenal and said in an interview on transition from playing in the right back position to a centre back. It was reported on 22 July 2010 that he signed a contract with the club, keeping him until 2013. However, Nordtveit continued to spend the rest of the first half of the 2010–11 season, playing for the reserve side.

==== Loan Spells from Arsenal ====
On 18 August 2008, Salamanca of the Segunda División signed him on a six-month loan. Upon joining the club, he played alongside another young Arsenal player, Pedro Botelho. Nordtveit came off the bench to make his debut for UD Salamanca as they drew 1–1 with Sevilla Atlético in the second fixture of the season. He then made his first start for the side, starting the whole game against Girona on 21 September 2008, as the club won 1–0. Arsenal recalled him on 29 October, after becoming unhappy with the amount of playing time the Norwegian had received. However, he was not eligible to play for the club until 1 January 2009.

On 10 March 2009, Norwegian top division outfit Lillestrøm signed Nordtveit on loan until 1 August 2009. He made his debut in the Tippeligaen in Lillestrøm's season opener away against Stabæk as a right fullback. This was a role which Nordtveit retained during his time with the Norwegian side, having become a first team regular. Despite missing two matches, he went on to make seventeen appearances for Lillestrøm in all competitions.

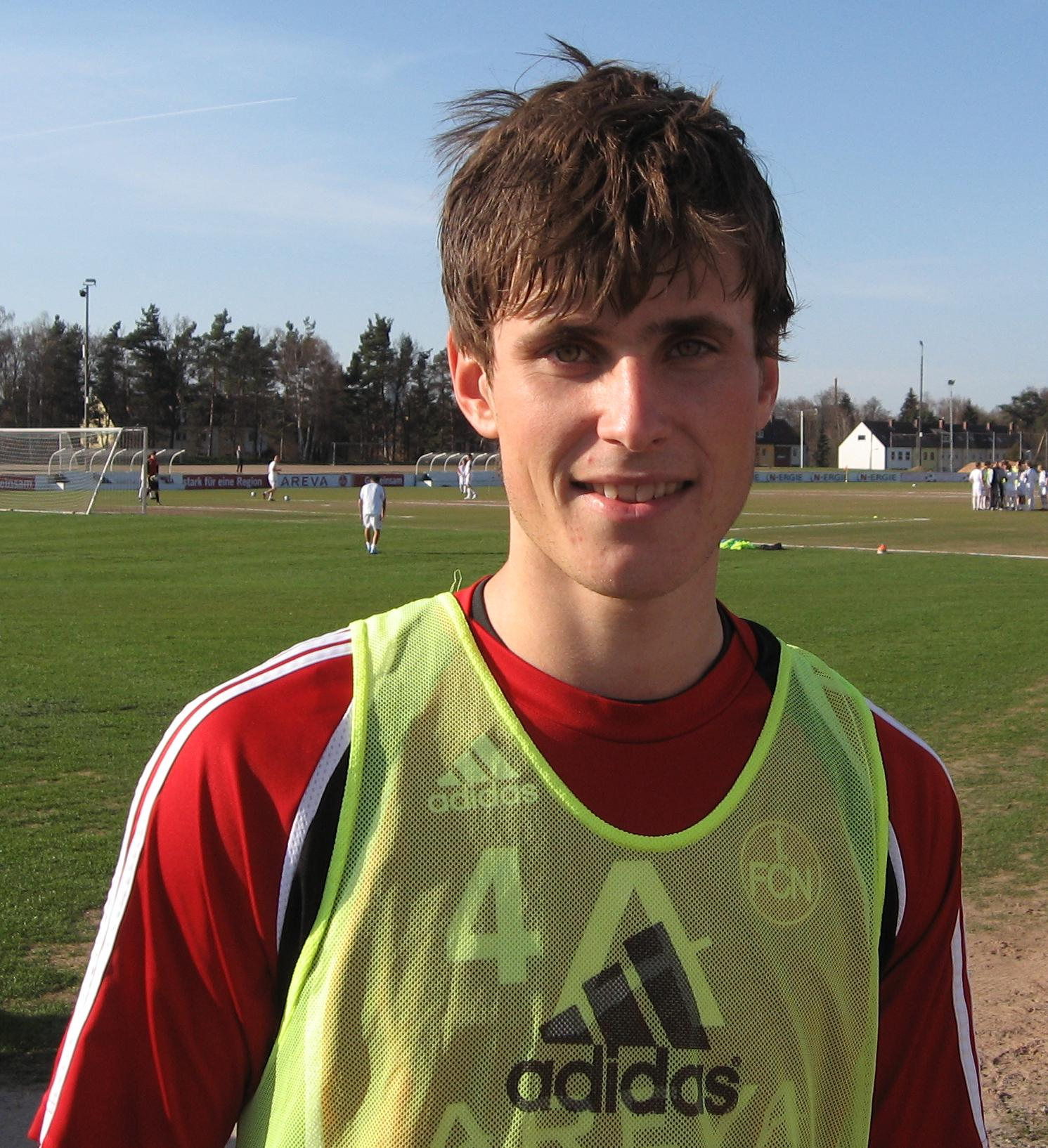
Nordtveit pictured while training during his time at 1. FC Nürnberg

On 28 July 2009, 1. FC Nürnberg agreed a one-year loan deal for the Norwegian defender from Arsenal for the rest of the 2009–10 season. He made his Nürnberg's debut, coming on as a second-half substitute, in a 2–0 loss against Hannover 96 in the opening game of the season. Nordtveit made his first start for the side, starting in the defensive midfield position and playing the whole game, in a 0–0 draw against VfB Stuttgart on 29 August 2009. After the match, his performance was praised by Bild and Nürnberger Nachrichter. Despite being a centre-back, Nordtveit's primary role at Nürnberg was in the defensive midfield position. This lasted until he suffered injuries for the next three months for the side. Although Nordtveit made three more starts for the side since returning to the starting line–up in March, he appeared as an unused substitute in both legs of the Relegation play-offs, as Nürnberg won 3 – 0 on aggregate. At the end of the 2009–10 season, Nordtveit made twenty appearances in all competitions. Following this, he returned to his parent club.

=== Borussia Mönchengladbach ===
On 30 December 2010, Nordtveit joined Borussia Mönchengladbach on a three-and-a-half-year contract, the transfer fee was £800,000. Upon leaving Arsenal, Manager Arsène Wenger said he needed to leave to get first team football, while also praising his talent.

Nordtveit made his competitive debut for the club on 15 January 2011 in their Bundesliga match against Nürnberg, a club Nordtveit played last season. Since making his debut for Borussia Mönchengladbach, he was used mostly as a defensive midfielder, and established himself as a key player for Gladbach, taking the departed Michael Bradley's place in the squad. Nordtveit also played once in right–back and centre–back position along the way. He then scored his first goal in Germany, against 1. FC Köln in a 5–1 victory for Borussia Mönchengladbach on 10 April 2011. He later played in both legs of the Relegation play-offs, as Borussia Mönchengladbach won 2–1 on aggregate and retained its Fußball-Bundesliga spot for the 2011–12 season. Despite being sidelined on two occasions, he finished the 2010–11 season, making eighteen appearances and scoring once in all competitions.

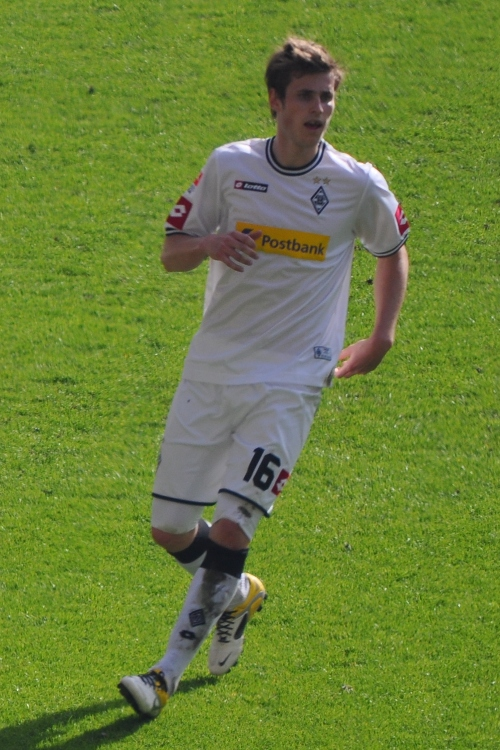
Nordtveit playing for Borussia Mönchengladbach in 2011

At the start of the 2011–12 season, Nordtveit continued to regain his first team place, playing in the defensive midfield position. Nordtveit played a role in the second round of the DFB–Pokal against 1. FC Heidenheim 1846 when he successfully converted the club's third penalty in the shoot–out, winning 4–2 to advance to the next stage. Nordtveit appeared in every match since the start of the 2011–12 season until he suffered a bruise ankle injury that saw him miss one match. Nordtveit started in the semi–finals of DFB-Pokal against Bayern Munich, where he missed the decisive penalty shot in the shoot–out that saw Borussia Mönchengladbach eliminated from the tournament. After serving a one match suspension, Nordtveit scored on his return, in a 2–1 loss against Hannover 96 on 1 April 2012. However, during a match against FC Augsburg on 28 April 2012, he suffered a shoulder injury, resulting in his substitution in the 40th minute and missed the rest of the 2011–12 season. Despite this, Nordtveit started the season well by helping the club go on a winning start for the side and even at one point, reached the top of the table; eventually, the club went on to finish fourth place in the league to qualify for the UEFA Champions League. Having mostly in the defensive midfield position throughout the 2011–12 season, he once played in the centre–back position, coming against VfL Wolfsburg on 19 August 2011. Nordtveit went on to make thirty–six appearances and scoring once in all competitions.

At the start of the 2012–13 season, Nordtveit recovered from a shoulder injury and continued to regain his first team place, playing in the defensive midfield position. Nordtveit started the season well when he scored his first goal of the season, in a 2–0 win against Alemannia Aachen in the first round of the DFB–Pokal. Nordtveit then played in both legs of the UEFA Champions League Play–Off Round against Dynamo Kyiv, as Borussia Mönchengladbach lost 4–3 on aggregate and was sent to the UEFA Europa League. His performance against Wolfsburg on 28 November 2012 earn praise from Manager Lucien Favre following his role in setting up the club's first goal of the game and for his "authentic" and "beautiful" performance. After helping the club qualify for the UEFA Europa League knockout stage, he signed a contract extension with Borussia Mönchengladbach, keeping him until 2016. However following a 2–1 win against Fortuna Düsseldorf on 26 January 2013, Nordtveit suffered a knee injury that kept him out for one match. But he made his return to the starting line–up against Bayer 04 Leverkusen on 9 February 2013, setting up the club's first goal of the game, in a 3–3 draw. Despite being sidelined on two occasions, Nordtveit returned to the starting line–up and scored in the last game of the season, losing 4–3 against Bayern Munich. At the end of the 2012–13 season, he went on to make forty–two appearances and scoring two times in all competitions.

At the start of the 2013–14 season, Nordtveit found himself behind the pecking order and was placed on the substitute bench. He then played a role, setting up two goals in two matches between 27 September 2013 and 5 October 2013 against Augsburg and Borussia Dortmund. However, Nordtveit suffered an ankle injury that kept him out for two months. It wasn't until on 1 December 2013 when he returned to the first team, coming on as a late substitute, in a 1–0 win against SC Freiburg. Having initially placed on the substitute bench, Nordtveit later regained his first team place, playing in the defensive midfield position for the rest of the season. In a match against Borussia Dortmund, he was sent–off a second bookable offence, in a 2–1 win on 8 March 2014. After serving a one match suspension, Nordtveit returned to the starting line–up, in a 1–0 loss against Eintracht Frankfurt on 15 March 2014. It wasn't until on 19 April 2014, he scored his first goal of the season, in a 4–2 loss. He later helped the club finish sixth place, thereby qualifying for the UEFA Europa League next season.

At the start of the 2014–15 season, Nordtveit played in the first leg of the UEFA Europa League Play–Off Round against FK Sarajevo, winning 3–2 as Borussia Mönchengladbach went on to win 10–2 on aggregate to advance to the group stage. However, he found himself in and out of the first team, which saw him placed on the substitute bench. It wasn't until on 2 October 2014 when Nordtveit scored his first European goal, in a 1–1 draw against FC Zürich. A month later on 22 November 2014, he scored his second goal of the season, in a 3–1 loss against Eintracht Frankfurt. Nordtveit then helped the club qualify for the knockout stage of the UEFA Europa League after going on five matches without a loss. He then scored his third goal of the season, in a 3–1 win against Borussia Dortmund on 11 April 2015. However, in the last game of the season against FC Augsburg, Nordtveit was sent–off in the 61st minute for a professional foul, as Borussia Mönchengladbach lost 3–1 and went on to finish third place, thereby qualifying for the UEFA Champions League. Despite this, he made thirty appearances and scoring three times in all competitions.

Having served the first two leagues matches of the 2015–16 season, Nordtveit made his first appearance of the season, starting the match and played 68 minutes before being substituted, in a 2–1 loss against Werder Bremen on 30 August 2015. He then made his UEFA Champions League, starting the whole game, in a 3–0 loss against Sevilla on 15 September 2015. Nordtveit scored his first goal of the season, in a 2–0 win against Wolfsburg on 3 October 2015. His second goal of the season came on 31 October 2015, in a 4–1 win against Hertha BSC. Having initially started in the defensive midfield position, Nordtveit began to play in the right–back position. He then scored his third goal of the season, in a 3–2 win against SV Darmstadt 98 on 20 December 2015. Following the absence of Granit Xhaka, Nordtveit captained the side in the next three matches and even scored his fourth goal of the season, in a 5–1 win against Werder Bremen on 5 February 2016. Having played once in the centre–back position earlier in the season, he reverted to the position for the rest of the season. Nordtveit later helped the club qualify for the UEFA Champions League next season by finishing fourth place in the league. At the end of the 2015–16 season, he went on to make thirty–nine appearances and scoring four times in all competitions.

=== West Ham United ===
On 16 May 2016, it was announced that Nordtveit would be joining West Ham United on 1 July 2016 on a five-year contract. It came after on 13 March 2016 that he would be leaving Borussia Mönchengladbach at the end of the 2015–16 season. Upon joining West Ham United, Nordtveit was given a number

Nordtveit made his official debut for the Hammers on 28 July in a 2–1 defeat to NK Domžale in the first leg of a Europa League qualifying match, playing the full 90 minutes in the centre–back position. He then started in the return leg, playing in the defensive midfield position, as they won 3–0 to advance to the next round. Two weeks later on 15 August 2016, Reid made his Premier League debut, starting a match and playing 67 minutes before substituted, in a 2–1 loss against Chelsea in the opening game of the season. He then found himself in and out of the starting line–up, due to competitions in both the centre–back and defensive midfield positions. Instead, Nordtveit began to play in the right–back position, though his performance received criticism. He then scored an own goal, as West Ham United lost 5–0 against Manchester City in the third round of the FA Cup. Following this, Nordtveit suffered ankle injury that kept him out for a month. Even after he returned from injury, Nordtveit found himself placed on the substitute bench and didn't make an appearance until on 15 April 2017 against Sunderland, coming on as an 81st-minute substitute, in a 2–2 draw. He then made three more appearances for the side for the last remaining matches of the season, returning to playing in the defensive midfield position. At the end of the 2016–17 season, Nordtveit made twenty–one appearances in all competitions.

=== TSG Hoffenheim ===
On 20 June 2017, West Ham announced that Nordtveit had signed for German side TSG Hoffenheim, for an undisclosed fee. Upon joining the club, he was given a number six shirt for the side.

Nordtveit made his Hoffenheim debut, where he started the whole game, in a 1–0 win against Rot-Weiß Erfurt in the first round of the DFB–Pokal. He then made his UEFA Champions League debut in the Play–Off Round First leg against Liverpool, where he started the whole game and set up the club's only goal of the game, in a 2–1 loss. In the return leg against Liverpool, however, Nordtveit was unable to help the club make a comeback, as they lost 4–2, eliminating the side to the UEFA Europa League. Since making his debut for Hoffenheim, he became a first team regular for the side for the next two months. But Nordtveit was plagued with injuries and lost his first team place for the next six months. During the sidelined, he did appear five times between the six months, three of them were starts. It wasn't until on 17 March 2018 when Nordtveit returned to the first team, coming on as an 81st-minute substitute, in a 3–3 draw against his former club, Borussia Mönchengladbach. Following this, he then featured six out of the seven remaining matches of the season. At the end of the 2017–18 season, Nordtveit made twenty–three appearances in all competitions.

At the start of the 2018–19 season, Nordtveit was involved in the first team, playing the club's first five matches of the season. He then scored his first Hoffenheim goal, scoring from a header, in a 2–2 draw against Shakhtar Donetsk in the UEFA Champions League match on 17 September 2018. However, Nordtveit suffered a thigh injury that kept him out for weeks. It wasn't until on 27 October 2018 when he returned from injury, coming on as a 63rd-minute substitute, in a 4–0 win against VfB Stuttgart. Nordtveit then appeared in the next five matches since returning from injury. However, he suffered another injury after suffering from bone edema and never played for the club for the rest of the 2018–19 season. Despite being plagued with injuries, Nordtveit made ten appearances and scoring once in all competitions.

Following his return from a loan spell at Fulham, Nordtveit, however, found himself behind the pecking order at Hoffenheim's squad and was placed on the substitute bench. It wasn't until on 5 October 2019 when he made his first appearance of the season, coming on as a 79th-minute substitute, in a 2–1 win against Bayern Munich. Nordtveit then suffered a bruised rib and didn't play for two months, even after returning from injury. It wasn't until on 17 December 2019 when he returned to the first team, coming on as a 60th-minute substitute and set up the club's second goal of the game, in a 2–0 win against Union Berlin. As the 2019–20 season progressed, Nordtveit continued to be in and out of the starting eleven for the side despite having injuries along the way. Despite the season was suspended because of the COVID-19 pandemic, he finished the 2019–20 season, making twelve appearances in all competitions.

=== Fulham (loan) ===
On 31 January 2019, Nordtveit join Fulham on loan until 30 June 2019.

Nordtveit made his Fulham debut, starting the whole game, in a 3–1 loss against former side West Ham United on 22 February 2019. He then started in the next three matches for the side. In total, Nordtveit made five appearances for Fulham as they were relegated to the Championship. Following this, he returned to his parent club at the end of the 2018 - 19 season.

== International career ==
=== Youth career ===
Having previously played for Norway U16, Nordtveit was called up to the Norway U17 squad for the first time in January 2007. He made his Norway U17 debut against Netherlands U17 on 7 February 2007, as they lost 1–0. Nordtveit was a regular for the Norway U-17 in qualifying and they barely missed out on a place at the 2007 European Championships.

After that, Nordtveit was promoted to the Norway U19 squad and made his debut for the U19 side against Italy U19 on 25 April 2007, winning 4–1. Three months later on 25 August 2007, he made his Norway U18 debut, starting the whole game, in a 2–1 win against Turkey U18. Nordtveit was ever-present during the 2009 European Championship qualifying, scoring three times, including a brace against Slovenia. However, Norway, once again, did not make it past the elite qualification stage.

After being called up to the U-21 team for the first time, Nordtveit made his debut, starting the whole game, in a 3–0 win against Syria on 23 November 2008. He has been a regular for the U-21 team in the 2011 European Championship qualifying campaign. After being left out of the senior team, Nordtveit was instead called up for the under-21 side where he played an important role in the 5–3 win against France U21 when Norway qualified for the 2013 UEFA European Under-21 Football Championship. Nordtveit then made three more appearances of the U21 side, including two appearances in the UEFA European Under-21 Football Championship. Despite this, the team would earn a bronze medal in the tournament.

=== Senior career ===
In May 2011, Nordtveit was called up to the Norway squad for the first time in his career. He made his first international appearance on 7 June 2011, in a friendly game against Lithuania. Three months later on 6 September 2011, Nordtveit made his second appearance for the national side, starting the whole game in the defensive midfield position, in a 2–0 loss against Denmark. Nordtveit scored his first goal for the national team when he scored Norway's first goal in the friendly match against Northern Ireland on 29 February 2012, which Norway won 3–0. Six month later on 15 August 2012, Nordtveit made his next Norway appearance against Greece, starting the whole game and set up the national side's second goal of the game, in a 3–2 loss.

Nordtveit later became a regular in the senior squad, but in October 2012 he was suspended from playing the 2014 FIFA World Cup qualification match against Cyprus due to yellow cards. After serving a one match suspension, Nordtveit returned to the starting line–up against Hungary on 14 November 2012 and played 45 minutes, as Norway won 2–0. Following Norway's unsuccessful World Cup qualification, he then began playing in the centre–back position for the rest of 2014. Nordtveit then scored his second Norway goal, in a 1–0 win against Azerbaijan on 16 November 2014. He then helped Norway finish third place in the UEFA Euro 2016 Group H to qualify for the qualifying play-offs. However, Nordtveit appeared as an unused substitute in both legs of the Play–Offs, as Norway lost 3–1 on aggregate against Hungary, eliminating the national side from the tournament.

Two years later on 13 June 2017 when Nordtveit captained Norway for the first time in his career, starting a match and played 45 minutes before being substituted at half time, in a 1–1 draw against Sweden. Throughout the 2018 World Cup qualifying stage, he helped the side keep three clean sheets in the last three matches of the campaign. They were out of play-off contention after a 6–0 defeat at Germany, and finished fourth in their group. Following this, Nordtveit captained the side in the next two Norway friendly matches for the national side between 11 November 2017 and 14 November 2017.

Nordtveit kept a clean sheet in the first match of the Group C of the UEFA Nations League, beating Cyprus 2–0. In a follow–up match against Bulgaria, however, he was sent–off for a second bookable offence, in a 1–0 loss. Despite this, Nordtveit later helped Norway get promoted to the second division. During the Group F of the UEFA Euro 2020 qualifying round, he kept two clean sheets, coming against Faroe Islands and Malta. By the end of the qualifying round, Norway finished third place and was place in Path C of the UEFA Euro 2020 qualifying stage in hopes of securing a UEFA Euro 2020 place.

== Career statistics ==
=== Club ===
As of match played 10 April 2022

Appearances and goals by club, season and competition
Club	Season	Division	League		National Cup		League Cup		Europe		Total	
Club	Season	Division	Apps	Goals	Apps	Goals	Apps	Goals	Apps	Goals	Apps	Goals
Haugesund	2006	Norwegian First Division	1	0	0	0	—		—		1	0
Haugesund	2007	Norwegian First Division	9	0	2	1	—		—		11	1
Haugesund	Total		10	0	2	1	—		—		12	1
Arsenal	2007–08	Premier League	0	0	0	0	0	0	0	0	0	0
Arsenal	2008–09	Premier League	0	0	0	0	0	0	0	0	0	0
Arsenal	Total		0	0	0	0	0	0	0	0	0	0
Salamanca (loan)	2008–09	Segunda División	3	0	0	0	—		—		3	0
Lillestrøm (loan)	2009	Tippeligaen	17	0	4	0	—		—		21	0
Nürnberg (loan)	2009–10	Bundesliga	19	0	1	0	—		—		20	0
Borussia Mönchengladbach	2010–11	Bundesliga	16	1	0	0	—		—		16	1
Borussia Mönchengladbach	2011–12	Bundesliga	31	1	5	0	—		—		36	1
Borussia Mönchengladbach	2012–13	Bundesliga	31	1	2	1	—		9 (Note: Two appearances in the Champions League and seven in the Europa League)	0	42	2
Borussia Mönchengladbach	2013–14	Bundesliga	21	1	0	0	—		—		21	1
Borussia Mönchengladbach	2014–15	Bundesliga	21	2	1	0	—		5 (Note: Appearances in the Europa League)	1	27	3
Borussia Mönchengladbach	2015–16	Bundesliga	31	4	2	0	—		6 (Note: Appearances in the Champions League)	0	39	4
Borussia Mönchengladbach	Total		151	10	10	1	—		20	1	181	12
West Ham United	2016–17	Premier League	16	0	1	0	1	0	3	0	21	0
TSG Hoffenheim	2017–18	Bundesliga	15	0	1	0	0	0	7 (Note: Two appearances in the Champions League and five in the Europa League)	0	23	0
TSG Hoffenheim	2018–19	Bundesliga	8	0	0	0	0	0	3	1	11	1
TSG Hoffenheim	2019–20	Bundesliga	11	0	1	0	0	0	0	0	12	0
TSG Hoffenheim	2020–21	Bundesliga	12	0	1	0	0	0	4	0	17	0
TSG Hoffenheim	2021–22	Bundesliga	9	0	0	0	0	0	0	0	9	0
TSG Hoffenheim	Total		55	0	3	0	0	0	14	1	68	1
Fulham (loan)	2018–19	Premier League	5	0	0	0	0	0	–		5	0
Career total			276	10	21	2	1	0	37	2	335	14

=== International goals ===
Scores and results list Norway's goal tally first.

#	Date	Venue	Opponent	Score	Result	Competition	Ref
1.	29 February 2012	Windsor Park, Belfast	Northern Ireland	1–0	3–0	Friendly	
2.	16 November 2014	Bakcell Arena, Baku	Azerbaijan	1–0	1–0	UEFA Euro 2016 qualification	

== Personal life ==
Born and raised in the village of Vats in the district of Haugaland in the far west of Norway, Nordtveit said he grew up idolising Ole Gunnar Solskjær. He has an older brother, Vegard Nordtveit, who was once a footballer before retiring, due to injury. During his time at Lillestrøm, Nordtveit once had his tooth taken out following a clash from Bernt Hulsker and refused to wear fake teeth until deciding to have teeth implants.

In the summer of 2014, Nordtveit married his long-term girlfriend, Anna. Together, they have two children, Odin and Elva.

== Honours ==
Norway U21

- UEFA European Under-21 Championship third place: 2013
