= Marc Gallego =

German footballer

Personal information
- Full name: Marc Alexander Gallego Vazquez
- Date of birth: 13 August 1985 (age 41)
- Place of birth: Karlsruhe, West Germany
- Height: 1.77 m (5 ft 10 in)
- Position: Right midfielder

Youth career
- –1995: FC Bavaria Wörth
- 1995–2004: Karlsruher SC

Senior career*
Years	Team	Apps	(Gls)
2004–2007	Karlsruher SC II	93	(4)
2007–2008	Sportfreunde Siegen	34	(4)
2008–2012	FSV Frankfurt	24	(0)
2009–2012	FSV Frankfurt II	41	(10)
2012–2013	Waldhof Mannheim	10	(4)
2013–2014	SV Elversberg	26	(2)
2014	Waldhof Mannheim	14	(3)
2014–2018	FC Homburg	114	(13)
2018–2019	TSV Essingen	24	(6)
2019–2022	Sportfreunde Dorfmerkingen		
- * Club domestic league appearances and goals

Marc Alexander Gallego Vazquez (born 13 August 1985) is a German former professional footballer who played as a right midfielder.
