= Roel Brouwers =

Dutch footballer

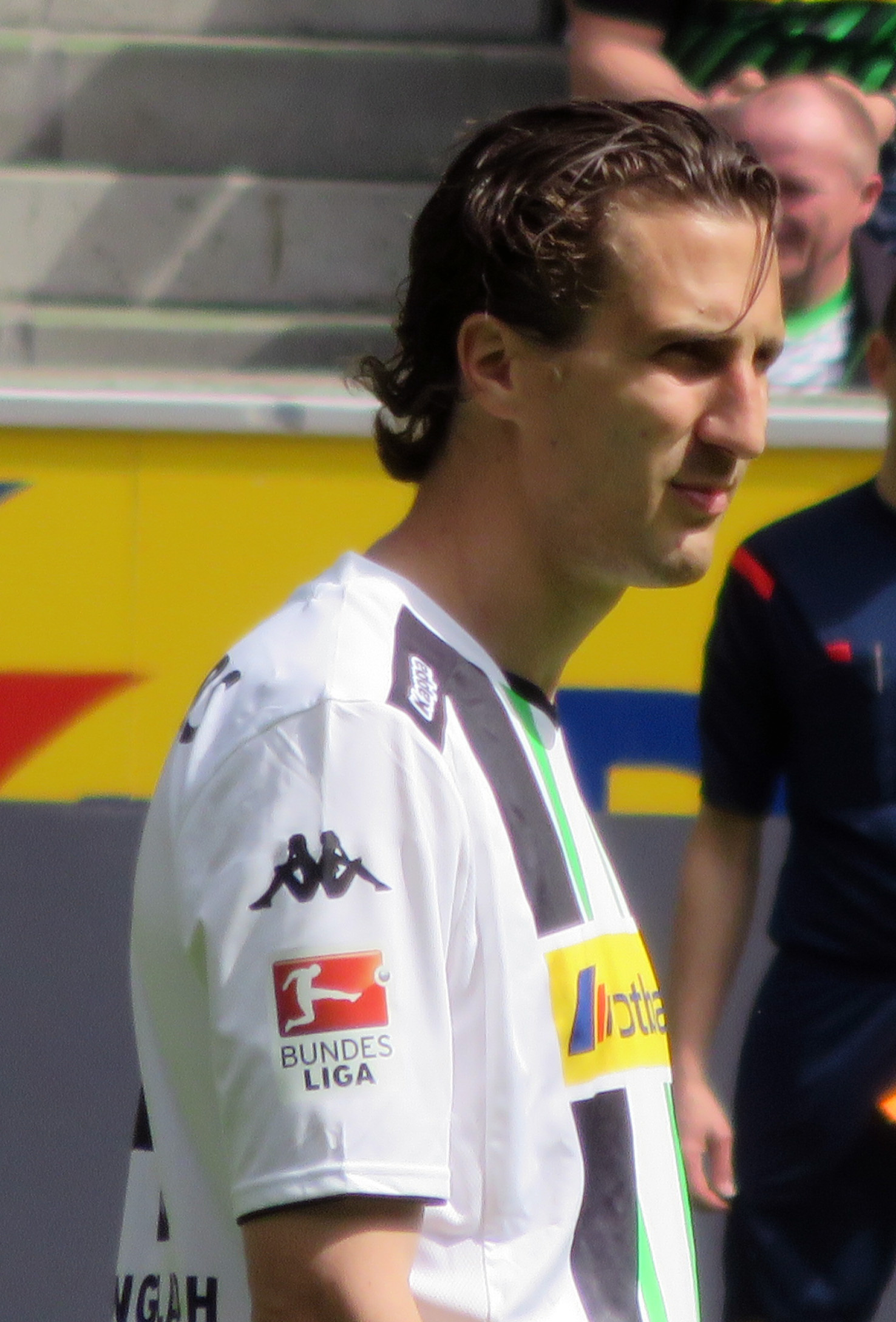
- Brouwers in 2015

Personal information
- Date of birth: 28 November 1981 (age 44)
- Place of birth: Heerlen, Netherlands
- Height: 1.90 m (6 ft 3 in)
- Position: Centre back

Youth career
- –2001: RKVV Weltania

Senior career*
Years	Team	Apps	(Gls)
2001–2005	Roda JC	49	(1)
2005–2007	Paderborn 07	59	(7)
2007–2016	Borussia Mönchengladbach	173	(15)
2016	Roda JC	8	(0)
Total		289	(23)
- * Club domestic league appearances and goals

Roel Brouwers (Dutch pronunciation: [rul ˈbrʌu.ərs]; born 28 November 1981) is a Dutch former footballer who last played for Roda JC Kerkrade in the Dutch Eredivisie.

== Club career ==
Brouwers played the majority of his professional career in Germany. He started at hometown amateur side Weltania Heerlen and had a few seasons with Roda JC before moving abroad to play for SC Paderborn 07. He then spent 9 years with Borussia Mönchengladbach, for whom he made his Champions League debut in September 2015 against Sevilla.

He rejoined Roda in summer 2016, only to finish his career in October 2016 after losing his place in the starting line-up and suffering minor injuries.

== Personal life ==
Although he was under contract at Borussia Mönchengladbach, Brouwers used to live with his wife and son in the Netherlands, in Voerendaal near the German border, 80 motorway kilometres located from Mönchengladbach.
