= 2014–15 Eintracht Frankfurt season =

Eintracht Frankfurt
2014–15 season
- Chairman: Heribert Bruchhagen
- Manager: Thomas Schaaf
- Bundesliga: 9th
- DFB-Pokal: Round 2
- Top goalscorer: League: Alexander Meier (19); All: Alexander Meier (20)
- Highest home attendance: 51,500 (sold out) on five occasions (league)
- Lowest home attendance: 34,400 3 February 2015 v VfL Wolfsburg (league)
- Average home league attendance: 47,618
| Home colours | Away colours | Third colours |
- All statistics correct as of 25 May 2015.

The 2014–15 Eintracht Frankfurt season was the 115th season in the club's football history. In 2014–15 the club played in the Bundesliga, the top tier of German football. It was the club's third season back in the Bundesliga and the 46th overall.

== Friendlies ==
Win Draw Loss

| 9 July 2014 | TuS Norderney | 0–10 | Eintracht Frankfurt | Norderney, Germany |
| 18:30 CEST (UTC+02:00) | | Report | Kadlec 6'; Meier 14', 31' (pen.); Aigner 21'; Dörner 46'; Bunjaki 61', 77'; Stendera 65', 79' (pen.) | Stadium: Sportplatz an der Mühle; Attendance: 750 |

| 11 July 2014 | Grün-Weiß Firrel | 0–7 | Eintracht Frankfurt | Firrel, Germany |
| 19:00 CEST (UTC+02:00) | | Report | Aigner 2'; Meier 11', 29'; Lanig 37'; Gerezgiher 75'; Dörner 79'; Azouaghi 90' | Stadium: GW-Anlage; Attendance: 1,550 |

| 17 July 2014 | Waldhof Mannheim | 5–2 | Eintracht Frankfurt | Mannheim, Germany |
| 18:30 CEST (UTC+02:00) | Müller 12' di Gregorio 15'; Haag 45'; Seegert 73'; Bari 90' | Report | Meier 50', 75' (pen.) | Stadium: Carl-Benz-Stadion; Attendance: 2,590; Referee: Tobias Fritsch (Germany) |

| 19 July 2014 | Eintracht Frankfurt | 1–2 | Terek Grozny | Friedrichshafen, Germany |
| 15:00 CEST (UTC+02:00) | Lanig 20' | Report | Ivanov 18'; Aílton 37' | Stadium: Zeppelinstadion; Attendance: 500; Referee: Tobias Fritsch (Germany) |

| 24 July 2014 | VfR Aalen | 1–1 | Eintracht Frankfurt | Crailsheim, Germany |
| 18:30 CEST (UTC+02:00) | Junglas 45' | Report | Meier 86' | Stadium: Schönebürgstadion; Attendance: 3,000 |

| 27 July 2014 | SV Sandhausen | 0–1 | Eintracht Frankfurt | Sandhausen, Germany |
| 17:00 CEST (UTC+02:00) | | Report | Meier 37' | Stadium: Hardtwaldstadion; Attendance: 2,200; Referee: Jochen Drees (Germany) |

| 2 August 2014 | Sampdoria | 4–2 | Eintracht Frankfurt | Genoa, Italy |
| 20:45 CEST (UTC+02:00) | Gabbiadini 12'; Éder 23' (pen.); Okaka 37'; Soriano 41' | Report | Inui 4'; Piazon 60' | Stadium: Stadio Luigi Ferraris; Attendance: 11,000; Referee: Davide Massa (Italy) |

| 5 August 2014 | Alessandria | 2–3 | Eintracht Frankfurt | Bardonecchia, Italy |
| 17:00 CEST (UTC+02:00) | Rantier 11', 67' (pen.) | Report | Terigi 51' (o.g.); Scotto 53' (o.g.); Kinsombi 77' | Stadium: Campo Sportivo; Attendance: 400 |

| 10 August 2014 | Eintracht Frankfurt | 3–1 | Inter Milan | Frankfurt, Germany |
| 15:30 CEST (UTC+02:00) | Piazon 26'; Seferovic 33', 39' | Report | Botta 25' | Stadium: Commerzbank-Arena; Attendance: 50,000; Referee: Christian Dingert (Germany) |

| 12 August 2014 | Rot-Weiß Walldorf | 0–7 | Eintracht Frankfurt | Mörfelden-Walldorf, Germany |
| 19:00 CEST (UTC+02:00) | | Report | Kadlec 10', 57' (pen.); Meier 25' (pen.), 37'; Rosenthal 29'; Madlung 49'; Russ 75' | Stadium: Stadion an der Okrifteler Straße; Attendance: 2,300; Referee: Mirko Radl (Germany) |

| 19 August 2014 | SV Nonnenroth / Hungen XI | 0–7 | Eintracht Frankfurt | Hungen, Germany |
| 18:00 CEST (UTC+02:00) | | Report | Piazon 2', 37'; Gerezgiher 15', 27'; Stendera 17'; Seferovic 35'; Inui 70' | Stadium: Stadion Lindenallee; Attendance: 2,500; Referee: Patrick Haustein (Germany) |

| 5 September 2014 | FSV Frankfurt | 0–1 | Eintracht Frankfurt | Frankfurt, Germany |
| 18:30 CEST (UTC+02:00) | | Report | Gerezgiher 46' | Stadium: Stadion am Bornheimer Hang; Attendance: 4,516; Referee: Christian Dietz (Germany) |

| 16 September 2014 | VfB Unterliederbach | 0–16 | Eintracht Frankfurt | Frankfurt, Germany |
| 17:45 CEST (UTC+02:00) | | Report | Meier 2', 5', 22', 86'; Kadlec 19', 26', 45'; Stendera 20', 33', 54', 61', 75'; Medojević 27'; Aigner 50', 56'; Russ 90' | Stadium: Sportplatz Hans-Böckler-Straße; Attendance: 1,000 |

| 7 October 2014 | FC Germania Enkheim | 0–4 | Eintracht Frankfurt | Frankfurt, Germany |
| 17:00 CEST (UTC+02:00) | | Report | Kittel 14'; Piazon 30'; Oczipka 34'; Yaffa 81' | Stadium: Riedstadion; Attendance: 1,352; Referee: Aaron Krämer (Germany) |

| 21 October 2014 | Opel Rüsselsheim | 2–12 | Eintracht Frankfurt | Rüsselsheim, Germany |
| 16:00 CEST (UTC+02:00) | Arslan 24'; Röse 79' | Report | Lanig 5', 67'; Kittel 6', 35'; Kadlec 8', 86'; Stendera 13', 55'; Madlung 28'; Szabo 32' (o.g.); Aigner 58'; Medojević 83' | Stadium: Stadion am Sommerdamm; Attendance: 1,400 |

| 25 November 2014 | Rot-Weiss Frankfurt | 0–5 | Eintracht Frankfurt | Frankfurt, Germany |
| 16:00 CET (UTC+01:00) | | Report | Lanig 13', 42', 55'; Bunjaki 38'; Medojević 61' | Stadium: Stadion am Brentanobad; Attendance: 1,300 |

| 9 January 2015 | Wehen Wiesbaden | 0–2 | Eintracht Frankfurt | Wiesbaden, Germany |
| 19:00 CET (UTC+01:00) | | Report | Suzuki 60'; Lanig 79' | Stadium: BRITA-Arena; Attendance: 4,180; Referee: Robert Kampka (Germany) |
Note: Musashi Suzuki was a trial player for Eintracht Frankfurt.

| 15 January 2015 | Eintracht Frankfurt | 2–3 | Hamburger SV | Al Ain, United Arab Emirates |
| 17:00 CET (UTC+01:00) | Meier 61'; Piazon 64' | Report | Beister 12'; Stieber 24'; Arslan 28' | Stadium: Hazza Bin Zayed Stadium; Attendance: 500; Referee: Hamad Ali Yousif (United Arab Emirates) |

| 18 January 2015 | Al Ain | 1–3 | Eintracht Frankfurt | Al Ain, United Arab Emirates |
| 17:00 CET (UTC+01:00) | Kembo Ekoko 7' | Report | Piazon 43'; Meier 65', 71' | Stadium: Hazza Bin Zayed Stadium; Attendance: 500; Referee: Mohammed Obaid Khadem (United Arab Emirates) |

| 24 January 2015 | Eintracht Frankfurt | 3–4 | Servette | Frankfurt, Germany |
| 15:00 CET (UTC+01:00) | Seferovic 40', 44' (pen.); Aigner 54' | Report | Roux 25', 26'; Avanzini 57'; Sauthier 61' | Stadium: Commerzbank-Arena; Attendance: 1,500; Referee: Marcel Göpferich (Germany) |

| 24 February 2015 | Eintracht Frankfurt | 1–2 | FSV Frankfurt | Frankfurt, Germany |
| 15:00 CET (UTC+01:00) | Kittel | Report | Kapllani (pen.) | Stadium: Platz an der Wintersporthalle; Attendance: 0 |
Note: This was a private match, with no attendance.

| 2 March 2015 | Eintracht Frankfurt | 5–2 | 1. FC Eschborn | Frankfurt, Germany |
| | Kittel; Seferovic | Report | Wade | Stadium: Platz an der Wintersporthalle; Attendance: 0 |
Note: This was a private match, with no attendance.

| 11 March 2015 | Eintracht Frankfurt | 2–2 | SV Sandhausen | Frankfurt, Germany |
| | Flum 5'; Kittel 15' | Report | Jovanović 10'; Gartler 12' | Stadium: Platz an der Wintersporthalle; Attendance: 0 |
Note: This was a private match, with no attendance.

| 24 March 2015 | Eintracht Frankfurt | 0–0 | Kosovo | Frankfurt, Germany |
| 19:00 CET (UTC+01:00) | | Report | | Stadium: Stadion am Bornheimer Hang; Attendance: 1,500 |

| 26 March 2015 | Eintracht Frankfurt | 3–2 | Wehen Wiesbaden | Frankfurt, Germany |
| | Valdez 33', 34'; Kittel 66' | Report | Schindler 44'; Benyamina 67' | Attendance: 0 |
Note: This was a private match, with no attendance.

| 31 March 2015 | FC Germania 09 Niederrodenbach | 0–16 | Eintracht Frankfurt | Rodenbach, Germany |
| 17:30 CEST (UTC+02:00) | | Report | Madlung 16'; Meier 17', 30', 31'; Piazon 19', 28'; Kittel 22', 35', 51'; Medojevic 51', 74', 86'; Flum 57' (pen.), 76'; Valdez 68', 89' | Stadium: Waldstadion; Attendance: 3,000 |

| 28 April 2015 | 1. FCA Darmstadt | 4–1 | Eintracht Frankfurt | Egelsbach, Germany |
| 18:00 CEST (UTC+02:00) | Lauria 74' | Report | Stendera 3'; Seferovic 16'; Kinsombi 23'; Waldschmidt 77' | Stadium: Sportzentrum Am Berliner Platz; Attendance: 1,000 |

| 12 May 2015 | Bayern Alzenau | 2–0 | Eintracht Frankfurt | Alzenau, Germany |
| 18:00 CEST (UTC+02:00) | Niesigk 37'; Kallina 52' | Report | | Stadium: Sportzentrum am Prischoß; Attendance: 1,800; Referee: Boris Reisert (Germany) |

| 25 May 2015 | Sportfreunde Heppenheim | 0–7 | Eintracht Frankfurt | Heppenheim, Germany |
| 15:00 CEST (UTC+02:00) | | Report | Flum 37'; Waldschmidt 54', 54', 61' (pen.), 86'; Kinsombi 73'; Chandler 83' | Stadium: Starkenburg-Stadion; Attendance: 3,500; Referee: Pfeifer |

| 26 May 2015 | KSC Volkartshain/Völzberg | 1–12 | Eintracht Frankfurt | Freiensteinau, Germany |
| 18:00 CEST (UTC+02:00) | Granobles 21' (pen.) | | Gerezgiher 3', 7', 24', 43'; Waldschmidt 7', 11'; Bunjaki 19', 86', 89'; Madlung 37'; Flum 52'; Kinsombi 81' | Stadium: Sportplatz Freiensteinau; Attendance: 2,000; Referee: Betz |

| 28 May 2015 | SV Seulberg | 0–6 | Eintracht Frankfurt | Friedrichsdorf, Germany |
| 18:30 CEST (UTC+02:00) | | Report | Kinsombi 24'; Trapp 37'; Häuser 53'; Waldschmidt 81'; Yaffa 84'; Gerezgiher 90' | Attendance: 2,000 |

== Indoor soccer tournaments ==
=== Harder13 Cup ===
Win Draw Loss

| 4 January 2015 First match | Karlsruher SC | 1–2 | Eintracht Frankfurt | Mannheim |
| 18:39 CET (UTC+01:00) | Goal | Report | Kadlec | Stadium: SAP Arena; Attendance: 10,000 |

| 4 January 2015 Second match | Waldhof Mannheim | 0–3 | Eintracht Frankfurt | Mannheim |
| 19:33 CET (UTC+01:00) | | Report | Gerezgiher; Bunjaki; Kadlec | Stadium: SAP Arena; Attendance: 10,000 |

| 4 January 2015 Third match | 1. FC Kaiserslautern | 4–5 | Eintracht Frankfurt | Mannheim |
| 20:31 CET (UTC+01:00) | | Report | Kadlec; Gerezgiher | Stadium: SAP Arena; Attendance: 10,000 |

| 4 January 2015 Fourth match | SV Sandhausen | 4–1 | Eintracht Frankfurt | Mannheim |
| 21:25 CET (UTC+01:00) | | Report | Gerezgiher | Stadium: SAP Arena; Attendance: 10,000 |

| 4 January 2015 Final | Karlsruher SC | 4–4 (4–5 p) | Eintracht Frankfurt | Mannheim |
| 22:23 CET (UTC+01:00) | | Report | Gerezgiher; Kadlec | Stadium: SAP Arena; Attendance: 10,000 |
| | Penalties |
| | Nazarov (penalty scored); Valentini (penalty scored); Barry (penalty scored); Nazarov (penalty scored); Valentini (penalty missed) | | (penalty scored) Oczipka; (penalty scored) Gerezgiher; (penalty scored) Kadlec; (penalty scored) Oczipka; (penalty scored) Gerezgiher |

=== Frankfurt Cup ===
Win Draw Loss

| 10 January 2015 First match | Eintracht Frankfurt (Germany) | 3–1 | (Switzerland) Grasshoppers | Frankfurt, Germany |
| 17:45 CET (UTC+01:00) | Piazon 4', 19'; Rosenthal 16' | Report | Dabour 11' | Stadium: Fraport Arena; Referee: Robert Kampka |

| 10 January 2015 Second match | Eintracht Frankfurt (Germany) | 3–5 | (Germany) Greuther Fürth | Frankfurt, Germany |
| 19:06 CET (UTC+01:00) | Medojević 2'; Bunjaki 10'; Rosenthal 15' | Report | Przybyłko 11'; Guilherme 14'; Weilandt 16'; Stiepermann 17', 19' | Stadium: Fraport Arena; Referee: Robert Kampka |

| 10 January 2015 Third match | Eintracht Frankfurt (Germany) | 5–2 | (Germany) Darmstadt 98 | Frankfurt, Germany |
| 20:31 CET (UTC+01:00) | Rosenthal 2'; Rinderknecht 3'; Azouaghi 9'; Kinsombi 16'; Bunjaki 19' | Report | Jungwirth 5'; Behrens 13' | Stadium: Fraport Arena; Referee: Christian Dietz |

| 10 January 2015 Fourth match | Eintracht Frankfurt (Germany) | 0–6 | (Germany) FSV Frankfurt | Frankfurt, Germany |
| 22:10 CET (UTC+01:00) | | Report | Schorr 3'; Huber 6'; Grifo 6', 8', 13'; Toski 17' | Stadium: Fraport Arena |

== Competitions ==
=== Bundesliga ===
==== League table ====
| Pos | Team | Pld | W | D | L | GF | GA | GD | Pts | Qualification or relegation |
|---|---|---|---|---|---|---|---|---|---|---|
| 7 | Borussia Dortmund | 34 | 13 | 7 | 14 | 47 | 42 | +5 | 46 | Qualification for the Europa League third qualifying round (Note: Since the winners of the 2014–15 DFB-Pokal, VfL Wolfsburg, qualified for the Champions League based on league position, the Europa League group stage spot was passed to the sixth-placed team, Schalke 04; and the Europa League third qualifying round spot was passed to the seventh-placed team, Borussia Dortmund.) |
| 8 | 1899 Hoffenheim | 34 | 12 | 8 | 14 | 49 | 55 | −6 | 44 | |
| 9 | Eintracht Frankfurt | 34 | 11 | 10 | 13 | 56 | 62 | −6 | 43 | |
| 10 | Werder Bremen | 34 | 11 | 10 | 13 | 50 | 65 | −15 | 43 | |
| 11 | Mainz 05 | 34 | 9 | 13 | 12 | 45 | 47 | −2 | 40 | |

Source: DFB
Rules for classification: 1) points; 2) goal difference; 3) number of goals scored

==== Results summary ====
| Overall | | | | | | | | Home | | | | | | Away | | | | | |
| Pld | W | D | L | GF | GA | GD | Pts | W | D | L | GF | GA | GD | W | D | L | GF | GA | GD |
|---|---|---|---|---|---|---|---|---|---|---|---|---|---|---|---|---|---|---|---|
| 34 | 11 | 10 | 13 | 56 | 62 | −6 | 43 | 9 | 5 | 3 | 36 | 26 | +10 | 2 | 5 | 10 | 20 | 36 | −16 |

Last updated: 23 May 2015.
Source: Competitive matches

==== Results by round ====
| Round | 1 | 2 | 3 | 4 | 5 | 6 | 7 | 8 | 9 | 10 | 11 | 12 | 13 | 14 | 15 | 16 | 17 | 18 | 19 | 20 | 21 | 22 | 23 | 24 | 25 | 26 | 27 | 28 | 29 | 30 | 31 | 32 | 33 | 34 |
|---|---|---|---|---|---|---|---|---|---|---|---|---|---|---|---|---|---|---|---|---|---|---|---|---|---|---|---|---|---|---|---|---|---|---|
| Ground | H | A | H | A | H | A | H | A | H | A | H | A | H | H | A | H | A | A | H | A | H | A | H | A | H | A | H | A | H | A | A | H | A | H |
| Result | W | D | L | D | D | W | W | L | L | L | L | W | W | W | L | D | D | L | D | D | W | L | W | L | W | L | D | L | D | L | L | W | D | W |
| Position | 5 | 5 | 10 | 12 | 10 | 7 | 5 | 8 | 11 | 12 | 12 | 12 | 9 | 7 | 8 | 9 | 9 | 9 | 9 | 9 | 9 | 9 | 8 | 9 | 8 | 8 | 8 | 8 | 10 | 11 | 12 | 11 | 11 | 9 |

Updated to match(es) played on 23 May 2015. Source: Competitive matches
A = Away; H = Home; W = Win; D = Draw; L = Loss

==== Matches ====
Win Draw Loss

| 23 August 2014 1 | Eintracht Frankfurt | 1–0 | SC Freiburg | Frankfurt |
| 15:30 CEST (UTC+02:00) | Seferovic 15'; Ignjovski (yellow card) 75' | Report | Schuster (yellow card) 44'; Klaus (yellow card) 64'; Günter (yellow card) 78' | Stadium: Commerzbank-Arena; Attendance: 46,200; Referee: Florian Meyer |

| 30 August 2014 2 | VfL Wolfsburg | 2–2 | Eintracht Frankfurt | Wolfsburg |
| 15:30 CEST (UTC+02:00) | Naldo 19'; Luiz Gustavo (yellow card) 21'; Guilavogui (yellow card) 59'; Arnold 79', (yellow card) 90+3' | Report | Jung 23' (o.g.); Zambrano (yellow card) 84'; Kadlec 86' | Stadium: Volkswagen Arena; Attendance: 27,528; Referee: Günter Perl |

| 14 September 2014 3 | Eintracht Frankfurt | 0–1 | FC Augsburg | Frankfurt |
| 15:30 CEST (UTC+02:00) | Anderson Bamba (yellow card) 21'; Hasebe (yellow card) 27'; Zambrano (yellow card) 69' | Report | Bobadilla 49'; Kohr (yellow card) 51'; Vergaegh (yellow card) 62'; Werner (yellow card) 77'; Feulner (yellow card) 90+3' | Stadium: Commerzbank-Arena; Attendance: 43,500; Referee: Manuel Gräfe |

| 20 September 2014 4 | Schalke 04 | 2–2 | Eintracht Frankfurt | Gelsenkirchen |
| 15:30 CEST (UTC+02:00) | Boateng (yellow card) 25' (yellow-red card) 61'; Choupo-Moting 40' (pen.); Draxler 50', (red card) 71'; Ayhan (yellow card) 88' | Report | Meier 15'; Russ 24'; Medojević (yellow card) 39' (yellow-red card) 85'; Zambrano (yellow card) 52'; Ignjovski (yellow card) 66' | Stadium: Veltins-Arena; Attendance: 61,798; Referee: Markus Schmidt |

| 23 September 2014 5 | Eintracht Frankfurt | 2–2 | Mainz 05 | Frankfurt |
| 20:00 CEST (UTC+02:00) | Seferovic (yellow card) 26', (goal) 82'; Meier 45+1'; Zambrano (yellow card) 79'; Hasebe (yellow card) 80' | Report | Hofmann 41'; Okazaki 44', (yellow card) 74'; Bell (yellow card) 57'; Jairo (yellow card) 90+4' | Stadium: Commerzbank-Arena; Attendance: 44,100; Referee: Felix Brych |

| 28 September 2014 6 | Hamburger SV | 1–2 | Eintracht Frankfurt | Hamburg |
| 17:30 CEST (UTC+02:00) | Behrami (yellow card) 20'; Müller 58'; Jiráček (yellow card) 89' | Report | Medojević (yellow card) 25'; Aigner (yellow card) 38'; Seferovic 44'; Piazon 90' | Stadium: Volksparkstadion; Attendance: 47,643; Referee: Florian Meyer |

| 4 October 2014 7 | Eintracht Frankfurt | 3–2 | 1. FC Köln | Frankfurt |
| 18:30 CEST (UTC+02:00) | Meier 44', 54'; Seferovic (yellow card) 55'; Wimmer 79' (o.g.) | Report | Risse 15'; Vogt (yellow card) 61'; Hector 65' | Stadium: Commerzbank-Arena; Attendance: 51,500; Referee: Wolfgang Stark |

| 19 October 2014 8 | SC Paderborn | 3–1 | Eintracht Frankfurt | Paderborn |
| 17:30 CEST (UTC+02:00) | Ducksch 66'; Hünemeier 79'; Kutschke 85' | Report | Ignjovski (yellow card) 37'; Meier 66' | Stadium: Benteler Arena; Attendance: 15,000; Referee: Deniz Aytekin |

| 25 October 2014 9 | Eintracht Frankfurt | 4–5 | VfB Stuttgart | Frankfurt |
| 15:30 CEST (UTC+02:00) | Madlung 21', 65'; Anderson Bamba (yellow card) 49'; Stendera (yellow card) 54'; Meier 57'; Aigner 61', (yellow card) 85'; Oczipka (yellow card) 83'; Russ (yellow card) 86'; Seferovic (red card) 86' | Report | Harnik 34', 36'; Gentner 51', 84'; Rüdiger (yellow card) 70'; Niedermeier (yellow card) 76'; Werner 81'; Romeu (yellow card) 83' | Stadium: Commerzbank-Arena; Attendance: 49,700; Referee: Christian Dingert |

| 1 November 2014 10 | Hannover 96 | 1–0 | Eintracht Frankfurt | Hanover |
| 15:30 CET (UTC+01:00) | Schulz (yellow card) 4'; Hirsch (yellow card) 46'; Madlung 88' (o.g.) | Report | Madlung (yellow card) 43'; Kinsombi (yellow card) 59' | Stadium: Niedersachsenstadion; Attendance: 42,200; Referee: Sascha Stegemann |

| 8 November 2014 11 | Eintracht Frankfurt | 0–4 | Bayern Munich | Frankfurt |
| 15:30 CET (UTC+01:00) | Chandler (yellow card) 32'; Aigner (yellow card) 38' | Report | Müller 23', 64', 67'; Ribéry (yellow card) 66'; Shaqiri 86' | Stadium: Commerzbank-Arena; Attendance: 51,500; Referee: Florian Meyer |

| 22 November 2014 12 | Borussia Mönchengladbach | 1–3 | Eintracht Frankfurt | Mönchengladbach |
| 15:30 CET (UTC+01:00) | Nordtveit 5'; Domínguez (yellow card) 75'; Xhaka (yellow card) 90+1' (yellow-red card) 90+2' | Report | Russ (yellow card) 9'; Stendera 54'; Meier 57'; Chandler (yellow card) 59'; Oczipka (yellow card) 68'; Inui 73' | Stadium: Borussia-Park; Attendance: 54,010; Referee: Bastian Dankert |

| 30 November 2014 13 | Eintracht Frankfurt | 2–0 | Borussia Dortmund | Frankfurt |
| 17:30 CET (UTC+01:00) | Meier 5'; Aigner (yellow card) 66'; Seferovic 78'; Lanig (yellow card) 85' | Report | Ginter (yellow card) 77'; Großkreutz (yellow card) 82' | Stadium: Commerzbank-Arena; Attendance: 51,500; Referee: Peter Gagelmann |

| 7 December 2014 14 | Eintracht Frankfurt | 5–2 | SV Werder Bremen | Frankfurt |
| 17:30 CET (UTC+01:00) | Inui (yellow card) 31'; Meier 34', 68'; Seferovic 52'; Aigner 76'; Stendera 80'; Chandler (yellow card) 85' | Report | Prödl (yellow card) 21'; Gebre Selassie 45'; Caldirola 79'; Fritz (yellow card) 90+1' | Stadium: Commerzbank-Arena; Attendance: 46,800; Referee: Christian Dingert |

| 12 December 2014 15 | 1899 Hoffenheim | 3–2 | Eintracht Frankfurt | Sinsheim |
| 20:30 CET (UTC+01:00) | Kim (yellow card) 35'; Volland 43'; Beck (yellow card) 58'; Szalai 65'; Roberto Firmino 87' (yellow card) 88' | Report | Anderson Bamba (yellow card) 32'; Aigner 58'; Hasebe (yellow card) 73'; Seferovic 77' | Stadium: Rhein-Neckar Arena; Attendance: 28,331; Referee: Jochen Drees |

| 17 December 2014 16 | Eintracht Frankfurt | 4–4 | Hertha BSC | Frankfurt |
| 20:00 CET (UTC+01:00) | Aigner (yellow card) 23', (goal) 43'; Seferovic 58'; Stendera (yellow card) 66'; Oczipka (yellow card) 79'; Meier 90', 90+1' | Report | Brooks 21' (yellow card) 50'; Ben-Hatira 33'; Schieber 37'; Ronny (yellow card) 66'; Niemeyer 80' | Stadium: Commerzbank-Arena; Attendance: 40,200; Referee: Guido Winkmann |

| 20 December 2014 17 | Bayer Leverkusen | 1–1 | Eintracht Frankfurt | Leverkusen |
| 15:30 CET (UTC+01:00) | Spahić (yellow card) 28'; Kießling (yellow card) 58'; Wendell (yellow card) 74'; Bellarabi 83' | Report | Meier 37' (pen.); Chandler (yellow card) 64'; Hildebrand (yellow card) 90+1' | Stadium: BayArena; Attendance: 30,210; Referee: Wolfgang Stark |

| 31 January 2015 18 | SC Freiburg | 4–1 | Eintracht Frankfurt | Freiburg im Breisgau |
| 15:30 CET (UTC+01:00) | Mehmedi (yellow card) 58'; Darida 61' (pen.); Günter (yellow card) 62'; Petersen 63', 69', 88'; Philipp (yellow card) 72' | Report | Russ 1'; Trapp (yellow card) 45'; Anderson Bamba (yellow card) 45'; Chandler (yellow card) 53' | Stadium: Dreisamstadion; Attendance: 24,000; Referee: Felix Zwayer |

| 3 February 2015 19 | Eintracht Frankfurt | 1–1 | VfL Wolfsburg | Frankfurt |
| 20:00 CET (UTC+01:00) | Aigner 58'; Hasebe (yellow card) 72'; Russ (yellow card) 90+2' | Report | Luiz Gustavo (yellow card) 28'; Rodríguez (yellow card) 49'; De Bruyne 88' | Stadium: Commerzbank-Arena; Attendance: 34,400; Referee: Günter Perl |

| 8 February 2015 20 | FC Augsburg | 2–2 | Eintracht Frankfurt | Augsburg |
| 17:30 CET (UTC+01:00) | Klavan 7'; Callsen-Bracker (yellow card) 23'; Bobadilla 37'; Kohr (yellow card) 57'; Højbjerg (yellow card) 87' | Report | Seferovic (yellow card) 15'; Zambrano (yellow card) 34'; Aigner 45+2'; Meier 70'; Chandler (yellow card) 74' | Stadium: SGL arena Attendance: 27,122; Referee: Knut Kircher |

| 14 February 2015 21 | Eintracht Frankfurt | 1–0 | Schalke 04 | Frankfurt |
| 18:30 CET (UTC+01:00) | Kittel (yellow card) 12'; Seferovic (yellow card) 35'; Russ (yellow card) 61'; Piazon 65', (yellow card) 90+2'; Hasebe (yellow card) 83' | Report | Höger (yellow card) 17' | Stadium: Commerzbank-Arena; Attendance: 50,400; Referee: Marco Fritz |

| 21 February 2015 22 | Mainz 05 | 3–1 | Eintracht Frankfurt | Mainz |
| 15:30 CET (UTC+01:00) | Clemens 38'; Geis 47'; Mallı 50'; Brosinski (yellow card) 62'; Bungert (yellow card) 68' | Report | Piazon (yellow card) 33'; Aigner 35', (yellow card) 81'; Zambrano (yellow card) 52' (yellow-red card) 83'; Seferovic (yellow card) 59' | Stadium: Coface Arena; Attendance: 33,237; Referee: Felix Brych |

| 28 February 2015 23 | Eintracht Frankfurt | 2–1 | Hamburger SV | Frankfurt |
| 18:30 CET (UTC+01:00) | Meier 12' (pen.), 54'; Madlung (yellow card) 31'; Piazon (yellow card) 88' | Report | Stieber 45+2'; Ostrzolek (yellow card) 53' (yellow-red card) 64'; Drobný (yellow card) 74'; Gouaida (yellow card) 82'; Djourou (yellow card) 90+2' | Stadium: Commerzbank-Arena; Attendance: 50,500; Referee: Florian Meyer |

| 8 March 2015 24 | 1. FC Köln | 4–2 | Eintracht Frankfurt | Cologne |
| 15:30 CET (UTC+01:00) | Peszko (yellow card) 22'; Deyverson 28', (yellow card) 38'; Risse 72'; Osako 79'; Ujah 82'; Wimmer (red card) 90+1' | Report | Seferovic (yellow card) 26'; Meier 58', 90+3' (pen.); Stendera (yellow card) 86' | Stadium: RheinEnergieStadion; Attendance: 50,000; Referee: Knut Kircher |

| 14 March 2015 25 | Eintracht Frankfurt | 4–0 | SC Paderborn | Frankfurt |
| 15:30 CET (UTC+01:00) | Stendera (yellow card) 15', (goal) 42'; Meier 27'; Aigner (yellow card) 55'; Valdez 82', (yellow card) 82' | Report | Strohdiek (yellow card) 24'; Koç (yellow card) 25'; Kutschke (yellow card) 45+2'; Hünemeier (yellow card) 58'; Lakić (yellow card) 84'; Kachunga (yellow card) 89' | Stadium: Commerzbank-Arena; Attendance: 46,000; Referee: Guido Winkmann |

| 21 March 2015 26 | VfB Stuttgart | 3–1 | Eintracht Frankfurt | Stuttgart |
| 15:30 CET (UTC+01:00) | Die (yellow card) 42'; Ginczek 63', 66'; Maxim 80' (yellow card) 81' | Report | Seferovic 51', (yellow card) 68'; Madlung (yellow card) 84' | Stadium: Mercedes-Benz Arena; Attendance: 48,500; Referee: Jochen Drees |

| 4 April 2015 27 | Eintracht Frankfurt | 2–2 | Hannover 96 | Frankfurt |
| 15:30 CEST (UTC+02:00) | Madlung 27'; Oczipka (yellow card) 28'; Kittel (yellow card) 44'; Aigner 54' | Report | Sakai (yellow card) 13'; Stindl (yellow card) 39'; Marcelo 68'; Ya Konan 82', (yellow card) 90+1' | Stadium: Commerzbank-Arena; Attendance: 49,600; Referee: Deniz Aytekin |

| 11 April 2015 28 | Bayern Munich | 3–0 | Eintracht Frankfurt | Munich |
| 15:30 CEST (UTC+02:00) | Dante (yellow card) 3'; Lewandowski 15', 66'; Müller 82' | Report | Madlung (yellow card) 35'; Stendera (yellow card) 66'; Ignjovski (yellow card) 88' | Stadium: Allianz Arena; Attendance: 75,000; Referee: Markus Schmidt |

| 17 April 2015 29 | Eintracht Frankfurt | 0–0 | Borussia Mönchengladbach | Frankfurt |
| 20:30 CEST (UTC+02:00) | Anderson Bamba (yellow card) 9'; Medojević (yellow card) 49'; Oczipka (yellow card) 51' | Report | Wendt (yellow card) 7'; Herrmann (yellow card) 58' | Stadium: Commerzbank-Arena; Attendance: 51,500; Referee: Marco Fritz |

| 25 April 2015 30 | Borussia Dortmund | 2–0 | Eintracht Frankfurt | Dortmund |
| 15:30 CEST (UTC+02:00) | Aubameyang 24' (pen.); Bender (yellow card) 27'; Kagawa 32'; Mkhitaryan (yellow card) 42'; Papastathopoulos (yellow card) 46' | Report | Kittel (yellow card) 25'; Zambrano (yellow card) 42'; Madlung (yellow card) 58' | Stadium: Westfalenstadion; Attendance: 80,667; Referee: Michael Weiner |

| 2 May 2015 31 | Werder Bremen | 1–0 | Eintracht Frankfurt | Bremen |
| 15:30 CEST (UTC+02:00) | Lukimya-Mulongoti (yellow card) 52'; Selke 66'; Sternberg (yellow card) 71' | Report | Stendera (yellow card) 39'; Inui (yellow card) 65' | Stadium: Weserstadion; Attendance: 42,100; Referee: Robert Hartmann |

| 9 May 2015 32 | Eintracht Frankfurt | 3–1 | 1899 Hoffenheim | Frankfurt |
| 15:30 CEST (UTC+02:00) | Oczipka 18'; Seferovic 27', (yellow card) 45'; Chandler 34'; Russ (yellow card) 50'; Aigner (yellow card) 69' | Report | Volland (yellow card) 5', (goal) 51'; Polanski (yellow card) 45'; Firmino (yellow card) 90+1' | Stadium: Commerzbank-Arena; Attendance: 50,600; Referee: Daniel Siebert |

| 16 May 2015 33 | Hertha BSC | 0–0 | Eintracht Frankfurt | Berlin |
| 15:30 CEST (UTC+02:00) | Brooks (yellow card) 19'; Lustenberger (yellow card) 28'; Pekarík (yellow card) 64' | Report | Oczipka (yellow card) 40'; Zambrano (yellow card) 42'; Hasebe (yellow card) 76'; Djakpa (yellow card) 77'; Aigner (yellow card) 85' | Stadium: Olympiastadion; Attendance: 60,168; Referee: Florian Meyer |

| 23 May 2015 34 | Eintracht Frankfurt | 2–1 | Bayer Leverkusen | Frankfurt |
| 15:30 CEST (UTC+02:00) | Seferovic 4'; Chandler (yellow card) 21'; Madlung 39'; Valdez (yellow card) 86' | Report | Bellarabi 6' | Stadium: Commerzbank-Arena; Attendance: 51,500; Referee: Guido Winkmann |

=== DFB-Pokal ===
Win Draw Loss

| 16 August 2014 Round 1 | Viktoria 1889 Berlin | 0–2 | Eintracht Frankfurt | Berlin |
| 20:30 CEST (UTC+02:00) | Schröder (yellow card) 78'; Ahmetcik (yellow card) 82'; Ergirdi (yellow card) 83' | Report | Seferovic 9'; Meier 90+3' | Stadium: Friedrich-Ludwig-Jahn-Sportpark; Attendance: 10,514; Referee: Thorsten Schriever |

| 29 October 2014 Round 2 | Eintracht Frankfurt | 1–2 | Borussia Mönchengladbach | Frankfurt |
| 20:30 CET (UTC+01:00) | Kadlec 89' | Report | Hazard 17'; Jantschke (yellow card) 41'; Traoré 67'; Domínguez (yellow card) 68' | Stadium: Commerzbank-Arena; Attendance: 46,500; Referee: Knut Kircher |

== Squad ==
=== Squad and statistics ===
As of 23 May 2015

| No. | Pos | Nat | Player | Total | | Bundesliga | | DFB-Pokal | |
| No. | Pos | Nat | Player | Apps | Goals | Apps | Goals | Apps | Goals |
|---|---|---|---|---|---|---|---|---|---|
| 1 | GK | (Germany) GER | Kevin Trapp | 24 | 0 | 23 | 0 | 1 | 0 |
| 3 | FW | (The Gambia) GAM | Yusupha Yaffa | 0 | 0 | 0 | 0 | 0 | 0 |
| 4 | MF | (Germany) GER | Marco Russ | 28 | 2 | 26 | 2 | 2 | 0 |
| 5 | DF | (Peru) PER | Carlos Zambrano | 18 | 0 | 18 | 0 | 0 | 0 |
| 6 | DF | (Germany) GER | Bastian Oczipka | 31 | 1 | 30 | 1 | 1 | 0 |
| 7 | MF | (Germany) GER | Jan Rosenthal | 0 | 0 | 0 | 0 | 0 | 0 |
| 8 | MF | (Japan) JPN | Takashi Inui | 30 | 1 | 28 | 1 | 2 | 0 |
| 9 | FW | (Switzerland) SUI | Haris Seferovic | 35 | 11 | 33 | 10 | 2 | 1 |
| 10 | FW | (Czech Republic) CZE | Václav Kadlec | 5 | 2 | 4 | 1 | 1 | 1 |
| 11 | FW | (Paraguay) PAR | Nelson Valdez | 12 | 1 | 11 | 1 | 1 | 0 |
| 13 | MF | (Germany) GER | Martin Lanig | 4 | 0 | 3 | 0 | 1 | 0 |
| 14 | MF | (Germany) GER | Alexander Meier | 27 | 20 | 26 | 19 | 1 | 1 |
| 15 | DF | (Ivory Coast) CIV | Constant Djapka | 7 | 0 | 6 | 0 | 1 | 0 |
| 16 | MF | (Germany) GER | Stefan Aigner | 29 | 9 | 28 | 9 | 1 | 0 |
| 17 | DF | (Germany) GER | Alexander Madlung | 24 | 4 | 23 | 4 | 1 | 0 |
| 18 | MF | (Germany) GER | Johannes Flum | 8 | 0 | 7 | 0 | 1 | 0 |
| 19 | FW | (Brazil) BRA | Lucas Piazon | 23 | 2 | 22 | 2 | 1 | 0 |
| 20 | MF | (Japan) JPN | Makoto Hasebe | 36 | 0 | 34 | 0 | 2 | 0 |
| 21 | MF | (Germany) GER | Marc Stendera | 28 | 3 | 27 | 3 | 1 | 0 |
| 22 | DF | (United States) USA | Timothy Chandler | 30 | 1 | 30 | 1 | 0 | 0 |
| 23 | DF | (Brazil) BRA | Anderson Bamba | 24 | 0 | 22 | 0 | 2 | 0 |
| 24 | FW | (Germany) GER | Luca Waldschmidt | 3 | 0 | 3 | 0 | 0 | 0 |
| 25 | MF | (Serbia) SRB | Slobodan Medojević | 16 | 0 | 15 | 0 | 1 | 0 |
| 26 | GK | (Germany) GER | Timo Hildebrand | 3 | 0 | 3 | 0 | 0 | 0 |
| 27 | MF | (Serbia) SRB | Aleksandar Ignjovski | 23 | 0 | 21 | 0 | 2 | 0 |
| 28 | MF | (Germany) GER | Sonny Kittel | 19 | 0 | 19 | 0 | 0 | 0 |
| 29 | GK | (Azerbaijan) AZE | Emil Balayev | 0 | 0 | 0 | 0 | 0 | 0 |
| 30 | GK | (Germany) GER | Felix Wiedwald | 11 | 0 | 10 | 0 | 1 | 0 |
| 31 | DF | (Germany) GER | David Kinsombi | 2 | 0 | 2 | 0 | 0 | 0 |
| 32 | MF | (Germany) GER | Joel Gerezgiher | 0 | 0 | 0 | 0 | 0 | 0 |

=== Transfers ===
==== Transferred in ====
| No. | Pos. | Name | Age | EU | Moving from | Type | Transfer Window | Contract ends | Transfer fee | Sources |
|---|---|---|---|---|---|---|---|---|---|---|
| 3 | Striker | Yusupha Yaffa | 27 | Yes | Milan | Free transfer | Winter | 30 June 2015 | Free | |
| 9 | Forward | Haris Seferovic | 22 | No | Real Sociedad | Transfer | Summer | 30 June 2017 | €3,200,000 | |
| 11 | Forward | Nelson Valdez | 30 | No | Al Jazira | Transfer | Summer | 30 June 2016 | Undisclosed | |
| 19 | Forward | Lucas Piazon | 20 | Yes | Chelsea | Loan | Summer | 30 June 2015 | €800,000 | |
| 20 | Midfielder | Makoto Hasebe | 30 | No | 1. FC Nürnberg | Free transfer | Summer | 30 June 2016 | Free | |
| 22 | Defender | Timothy Chandler | 24 | Yes | 1. FC Nürnberg | Transfer | Summer | 30 June 2017 | €1,000,000 | |
| 24 | Forward | Luca Waldschmidt | 18 | Yes | Eintracht Frankfurt U19 | Academy | Summer | 30 June 2017 | Free | |
| 25 | Midfielder | Slobodan Medojević | 23 | No | VfL Wolfsburg | Transfer | Summer | 30 June 2016 | €1,500,000 | |
| 26 | Goalkeeper | Timo Hildebrand | 35 | Yes | Free Agent | Free transfer | After the summer window | 30 June 2015 | Free | |
| 27 | Midfielder | Aleksandar Ignjovski | 23 | No | Werder Bremen | Free transfer | Summer | 30 June 2017 | Free | |
| 29 | Goalkeeper | Emil Balayev | 20 | No | Neftchi Baku | Free transfer | Winter | 30 June 2016 | Free | |
| 31 | Defender | David Kinsombi | 18 | Yes | Mainz 05 | Free transfer | Summer | 30 June 2016 | Free | |
| 32 | Midfielder | Joel Gerezgiher | 18 | Yes | Eintracht Frankfurt U19 | Academy | Summer | 30 June 2015 | Free | |

==== Transferred out ====
| No. | Pos. | Name | Age | EU | Moving to | Type | Transfer Window | Transfer fee | Sources |
|---|---|---|---|---|---|---|---|---|---|
| 7 | Midfielder | Jan Rosenthal | 28 | Yes | Darmstadt 98 | Loan | Winter | Undisclosed | |
| 9 | Striker | Joselu | 24 | Yes | Hannover 96 | Loan end | Summer | Was previously loaned from 1899 Hoffenheim | |
| 10 | Striker | Václav Kadlec | 22 | Yes | Sparta Prague | Loan | Winter | Undisclosed | |
| 13 | Midfielder | Martin Lanig | 30 | Yes | APOEL | Transfer | Winter | €75,000 | |
| 17 | Defender | Stephan Schröck | 26 | Yes | Greuther Fürth | Transfer | Summer | €200,000 | |
| 19 | Midfielder | Marvin Bakalorz | 24 | Yes | SC Paderborn | Transfer | Summer | €150,000 | |
| 20 | Midfielder | Sebastian Rode | 23 | Yes | Bayern Munich | End of contract | Summer | Free | |
| 22 | Defender | Stefano Celozzi | 25 | Yes | VfL Bochum | End of contract | Summer | Free | |
| 24 | Defender | Sebastian Jung | 24 | Yes | VfL Wolfsburg | Transfer | Summer | €2,500,000 | |
| 25 | Midfielder | Tranquillo Barnetta | 29 | No | Schalke 04 | Loan return | Summer | Free | |
| 26 | Midfielder | Tobias Weis | 28 | Yes | 1899 Hoffenheim | Loan return | Summer | Free | |
| 26 | Goalkeeper | Timo Hildebrand | 35 | Yes | Free Agent | Released | Winter | Free | |
| 27 | Midfielder | Pirmin Schwegler | 27 | No | 1899 Hoffenheim | Transfer | Summer | €1,900,000 | |
| 32 | Goalkeeper | Aykut Özer | 21 | Yes | Kardemir Karabükspor | End of contract | Summer | Free | |
| 33 | Defender | Alexander Hien | 21 | Yes | Wormatia Worms | End of contract | Summer | Free | |
| 34 | Midfielder | Erik Wille | 21 | Yes | MSV Duisburg | Transfer | Summer | €50,000 | |
| 36 | Defender | Marc-Oliver Kempf | 19 | Yes | SC Freiburg | Transfer | Summer | €800,000 | |
| | Striker | Olivier Occéan | 33 | No | Odds BK; Was previously on loan to 1. FC Kaiserslautern | Loan | Winter | Undisclosed | |
