= 2012–13 Eintracht Frankfurt season =

Eintracht Frankfurt
2012–13 season
- Chairman: Heribert Bruchhagen
- Manager: Armin Veh
- Bundesliga: 6th
- DFB-Pokal: 1st round
- Top goalscorer: League: Alexander Meier (16); All: Alexander Meier (16)
- Highest home attendance: 51,500 (sold out) on eight occasions (league)
- Lowest home attendance: 27,950 25 August 2012 v Bayer Leverkusen (league) (limited capacity due to a league judgement)
- Average home league attendance: 48,044
Home colours	Away colours	Third colours

The 2012–13 Eintracht Frankfurt season was the 113th season in the club's football history. In 2012–13 the club played in the Bundesliga, the top tier of German football. It was the club's first season back in this league and 44th overall, having been promoted from the 2. Bundesliga in 2012. Finishing the domestic season in sixth position, Eintracht qualified for the UEFA Europa League 2013–14.

The club also took part in the 2012–13 edition of the DFB-Pokal, the German Cup, where it was knocked out by 2. Bundesliga side Erzgebirge Aue.

== Matches ==
=== Legend ===
Win Draw Loss Postponed

=== Friendlies ===
10 July 2012	Blau-Weiß Linz	2–3	Eintracht Frankfurt	Linz, Austria
19:00 CEST	Lindner 1'; Huspek 21'	(report)	Aigner 13'; Aigner 19'; Occéan 45'	Stadium: Donauparkstadion; Attendance: 1,300; Referee: Manuel Schüttengruber

13 July 2012	FSV Hollenbach	1–4	Eintracht Frankfurt	Mulfingen, Germany
17:00 CEST	Nunuzi 46'	(report)	Inui 20'; Meier 33'; Lanig 65'; Occéan 75'	Stadium: Jako-Arena; Attendance: 2,000; Referee: Arno Blos

18 July 2012	SG Anspach	0–10	Eintracht Frankfurt	Wehrheim, Germany
18:30		(report)	Occéan 3', 30'; Köhler 8', 13', 26', 35', 44'; Friend 54'; Idrissou 66'; Celozzi 70'	Stadium: Oberloh; Attendance: 3,000; Referee: Aaron Krämer

20 July 2012	VfR Aalen	0–2	Eintracht Frankfurt	Crailsheim, Germany
19:00 CEST		(report)	Meier 16', 57'	Stadium: Schönebürgstadion; Attendance: 1,650; Referee: Brand

21 July 2012	FK Pirmasens	0–2	Eintracht Frankfurt	Pirmasens, Germany
16:00 CEST		(report)	Kittel 17'; Idrissou 59'	Stadium: Sportpark Husterhöhe; Attendance: 3,200; Referee: Dominik Beringer

25 July 2012	SV Waldhof Mannheim	0–2	Eintracht Frankfurt	Mannheim, Germany
19:00 CEST		(report)	Köhler 56' (pen.); Matmour 74'	Stadium: Carl-Benz-Stadion; Attendance: 3,500; Referee: Tobias Fritsch

4 August 2012	Eintracht Frankfurt	2–2	Zagłębie Lubin	Steyr, Austria
18:00 CEST	Hoffer 62'; Köhler 89'	(report)	Jež 65', 82'	Stadium: Vorwärts-Stadion

7 August 2012	Red Bull Salzburg	1–4	Eintracht Frankfurt	Linz, Austria
19:30 CEST	Maierhofer 60'	(report)	Meier 30', 35', 42'; Matmour 58'	Stadium: Linzer Stadion; Attendance: 1,500

11 August 2012	Eintracht Frankfurt	4–2	Valencia	Frankfurt, Germany
15:30 CEST	Aigner 20'; Occéan 23', 63'; Hoffer 81'	(report)	Piatti 27'; Hernández 52'	Stadium: Commerzbank-Arena; Attendance: 20,100; Referee: Tobias Welz

5 September 2012	SG Steinau 08	1–20	Eintracht Frankfurt	Petersberg, Germany
18:00 CEST	Diegelmann 35'	(report)	Hoffer 5', 33', 77', 90'; Djakpa 8'; Köhler 18', 36', 67', 68', 88'; Kittel 30', 44' (pen.), 85', 86'; Friend 38'; Butscher 45'; Anderson 50', 70'; Kempf 82'; Schnellbacher 84'	Stadium: Sportplatz Steinau; Attendance: 2,600; Referee: Jan Lübberstedt

7 September 2012	FSV Frankfurt	0–0	Eintracht Frankfurt	Frankfurt, Germany
18:30 CEST				Stadium: Frankfurter Volksbank Stadion; Attendance: 4,235

9 October 2012	TuS Dietkirchen	2–3	Eintracht Frankfurt	Dietkirchen, Germany
17:30 CEST	Schmitz 35'; Granja 40'	(Report)	Hoffer 20'; Friend 33', 39'	Stadium: Reckenforst; Attendance: 2,000

12 October 2012	TV Fränkisch-Crumbach	1–23	Eintracht Frankfurt	Fränkisch-Crumbach, Germany
17:30 CEST	Toch 29'	(Report)	Köhler 5', 12', 32'; Matmour 8', 11', 22', 33'; Hoffer 9', 40'; Kittel 15', 30', 37'; Lanig 17', 20', 45'; Wille 41'; Aigner 55', 82'; Friend 68', 72', 86'; Matei 80', 89'	Stadium: Sportzentrum an der Saroltastraße; Attendance: 2,500

6 January 2013	Al Jazira	5–4	Eintracht Frankfurt	Abu Dhabi, United Arab Emirates
16:15 CEST	Oliveira 17', 23', 85'; Fernandinho 60'; Jumaa 71', (red card) 90'		Meier 9', 16', 37'; Occéan 50'	Stadium: Mohammed Bin Zayed Stadium; Attendance: 250

11 January 2013	Eintracht Frankfurt	2–3	Borussia Mönchengladbach	Dubai, United Arab Emirates
16:00 CEST	Meier 13'; Inui 81'		De Jong 36'; Nordtveit 44'; Marx 62' (pen.)	Stadium: 7he Sevens; Attendance: 300; Referee: Fahad Alksar

23 March 2013	SpVgg 05 Oberrad	1–5	Eintracht Frankfurt	Frankfurt, Germany
16:00 CEST	Moscelli 47'; Inui 81'		Lakić 13', 28' (pen.), 77'; Matmour 17'; Kittel 82'	Stadium: Sportanlage Beckerwiese; Attendance: 1,200; Referee: Fahad Alksar

19 May 2013	SV Erzhausen	2–9	Eintracht Frankfurt	Erzhausen, Germany
15:00 CEST	Saur 74', 90'		Matmour 8', 11', 16', 45', 62'; Oczipka 14'; Lanig 25', 42'; Occéan 84'	Stadium: Sportplatz in der Heinrichstraße; Attendance: 1,700; Referee: David Wegmann

20 May 2013	TSV 1920 Rothemann	1–13	Eintracht Frankfurt	Eichenzell, Germany
15:00 CEST	Straub 44'		Lanig 10', 40', 60', 76'; Oczipka 17', 84'; Amedick 19' (pen.), 37' (pen.), 90', 90'; Aigner 58'; Occéan 61'; Bartel 87'	Stadium: Sportanlage Rothemann; Attendance: 2,500; Referee: Dennis Meinhardt

21 May 2013	SV Nieder-Weisel	1–9	Eintracht Frankfurt	Butzbach, Germany
18:30 CEST	Ruppel 13'		Matmour 17', 29', 39'; Djakpa 20', 48', 84'; Lakić 33'; Gerezgiher 73'; Occéan 76'	Stadium: Sportanlage Am Wiesengrund; Attendance: 2,000; Referee: René Schmidt

22 May 2013	SKG Wallerstädten	2–17	Eintracht Frankfurt	Groß-Gerau, Germany
18:30 CEST	Duschl 52' 87'		Matmour 12', 25', 34', 38', 69', 76', 89'; Gerezgiher 16'; Occéan 18', 21'; Lanig 29', 32', 67', 80'; Djakpa 45', 64' (pen.); Russ 87'	Stadium: Sportanlage auf dem Deich; Attendance: 1,300; Referee: Christoph Schröder

=== Bundesliga ===
==== League table ====
Pos	Team	Pld	W	D	L	GF	GA	GD	Pts	Qualification or relegation
4	Schalke 04	34	16	7	11	58	50	+8	55	Qualification for the Champions League play-off round
5	SC Freiburg	34	14	9	11	45	40	+5	51	Qualification for the Europa League group stage
6	Eintracht Frankfurt	34	14	9	11	49	46	+3	51	Qualification for the Europa League play-off round
7	Hamburger SV	34	14	6	14	42	53	−11	48	
8	Borussia Mönchengladbach	34	12	11	11	45	49	−4	47	

Source: Bundesliga.de, kicker.de
Rules for classification: 1) points; 2) goal difference; 3) number of goals scored.

==== Results by round ====
Round	1	2	3	4	5	6	7	8	9	10	11	12	13	14	15	16	17	18	19	20	21	22	23	24	25	26	27	28	29	30	31	32	33	34
Ground	H	A	H	A	H	H	A	H	A	H	A	H	A	H	A	H	A	A	H	A	H	A	A	H	A	H	A	H	A	H	A	H	A	H
Result	W	W	W	W	D	W	L	W	L	D	L	W	D	L	L	W	W	L	W	W	D	L	D	L	D	L	W	L	L	W	D	W	D	D
Position	3	2	2	2	2	2	2	2	3	3	3	3	4	5	5	4	4	4	4	4	4	4	4	4	5	4	5	6	6	6	5	5	6	6

Source: kicker.de
A = Away; H = Home; W = Win; D = Draw; L = Loss

==== Positions by round ====
The table lists the positions of teams after each week of matches. In order to preserve chronological evolvements, any postponed matches are not included to the round at which they were originally scheduled, but added to the full round they were played immediately afterwards. For example, if a match is scheduled for matchday 13, but then postponed and played between days 16 and 17, it will be added to the standings for day 16.

Team ╲ Round	1	2	3	4	5	6	7	8	9	10	11	12	13	14	15	16	17	18	19	20	21	22	23	24	25	26	27	28	29	30	31	32	33	34
Bayern Munich	1	1	1	1	1	1	1	1	1	1	1	1	1	1	1	1	1	1	1	1	1	1	1	1	1	1	1	1	1	1	1	1	1	1
Borussia Dortmund	3	6	5	4	6	3	4	4	4	5	4	4	2	3	3	3	3	3	3	2	2	2	2	2	2	2	2	2	2	2	2	2	2	2
Bayer Leverkusen	13	9	12	13	8	7	6	5	5	4	5	5	5	2	2	2	2	2	2	3	3	3	3	3	3	3	3	3	3	3	3	3	3	3
Schalke 04	8	4	4	5	4	4	3	3	2	2	2	2	3	4	4	5	7	5	6	6	10	9	9	6	4	5	4	4	4	4	4	4	4	4
SC Freiburg	11	14	8	8	12	14	11	7	12	12	11	10	6	10	12	9	5	6	8	8	5	5	5	5	8	9	7	5	5	5	6	6	5	5
Eintracht Frankfurt	5	2	2	2	2	2	2	2	3	3	3	3	4	5	5	4	4	4	4	4	4	4	4	4	5	4	5	6	6	6	5	5	6	6
Hamburger SV	15	15	17	15	14	10	8	10	7	9	10	9	10	8	9	7	10	9	9	9	7	6	6	7	6	8	9	11	8	8	8	7	7	7
Borussia Mönchengladbach	4	8	9	9	10	13	10	13	9	11	8	11	11	9	10	8	8	8	7	7	8	10	10	9	9	7	8	7	7	7	7	8	8	8
Hannover 96	9	3	3	3	3	5	5	6	10	6	6	6	8	6	11	10	11	11	10	10	9	8	7	10	10	10	10	9	10	11	9	9	9	9
1. FC Nürnberg	6	7	6	6	9	12	14	15	15	14	15	15	15	13	14	13	14	15	15	14	13	14	14	13	11	11	11	10	11	12	13	13	13	10
VfL Wolfsburg	7	12	10	10	13	16	17	18	16	16	16	13	13	15	15	14	15	13	13	15	12	15	15	15	12	13	12	12	12	13	11	11	10	11
VfB Stuttgart	16	18	16	17	17	15	15	12	8	10	12	12	12	11	7	6	9	10	11	12	14	12	11	11	14	12	13	13	13	10	12	12	11	12
Mainz 05	10	13	14	12	15	11	9	8	6	8	7	8	9	7	6	11	6	7	5	5	6	7	8	8	7	6	6	8	9	9	10	10	12	13
Werder Bremen	14	10	11	11	7	8	13	9	11	7	9	7	7	12	8	12	12	12	12	11	11	11	12	14	13	14	14	14	14	14	14	14	14	14
FC Augsburg	17	16	15	18	18	18	16	16	17	18	18	18	18	18	17	17	17	17	16	17	17	17	16	16	16	16	16	16	16	16	16	16	16	15
1899 Hoffenheim	12	17	18	16	11	9	12	14	14	13	13	14	16	16	16	16	16	16	17	16	16	16	17	17	17	17	17	17	17	17	17	17	17	16
Fortuna Düsseldorf	2	5	7	7	5	6	7	11	13	15	14	16	14	14	13	15	13	14	14	13	15	13	13	12	15	15	15	15	15	15	15	15	15	17
SpVgg Greuther Fürth	18	11	13	14	16	17	18	17	18	17	17	17	17	17	18	18	18	18	18	18	18	18	18	18	18	18	18	18	18	18	18	18	18	18

Leader
2013–14 UEFA Champions League Group stage
2013–14 UEFA Champions League Play-off round
2013–14 UEFA Europa League Play-off round
2013–14 UEFA Europa League Third qualifying round
Qualification to relegation playoffs
Relegation to 2014–15 2. Bundesliga

Source: kicker.de

==== Matches ====
25 August 2012 1	Eintracht Frankfurt	2–1	Bayer Leverkusen	Frankfurt
18:30 CEST	Anderson Bamba (yellow card) 34'; Aigner 57'; Lanig 82'	(Report)	Kießling 30', (yellow card) 88'; Schwaab (yellow card) 42'	Stadium: Commerzbank-Arena; Attendance: 27,950 (limited capacity due to a league judgement); Referee: Thorsten Kinhöfer

1 September 2012 2	TSG Hoffenheim	0–4	Eintracht Frankfurt	Sinsheim
15:30 CEST	Schröck (yellow card) 29' (yellow-red card) 74'; Weis (yellow card) 56'; Salihović (yellow card) 68' (yellow-red card) 70'	(Report)	Oczipka (yellow card) 4'; Meier 39', 83' (pen.); Schwegler 43'; Inui (yellow card) 73'; Lanig 90'	Stadium: Rhein-Neckar Arena; Attendance: 29,650; Referee: Michael Weiner

16 September 2012 3	Eintracht Frankfurt	3–2	Hamburger SV	Frankfurt
17:30 CEST	Inui 13'; Occéan 18'; Aigner 52'	(Report)	Westermann 45'; Jiráček (red card) 45+2'; Son 63'; Iličević (yellow card) 90+2'	Stadium: Commerzbank-Arena; Attendance: 51,500; Referee: Wolfgang Stark

21 September 2012 4	1. FC Nürnberg	1–2	Eintracht Frankfurt	Nuremberg
20:30 CEST	Polter 76', (yellow card) 85'	(report)	Zambrano (yellow card) 10'; Hoffer 25'; Inui 60'; Meier (yellow card) 75'; Jung (yellow card) 89'	Stadium: Frankenstadion; Attendance: 45,033; Referee: Felix Zwayer

25 September 2012 5	Eintracht Frankfurt	3–3	Borussia Dortmund	Frankfurt
20:00 CEST	Piszczek 25'; Reus 28'; Götze 54'; Lewandowski (yellow card) 80'	(Report)	Aigner 49'; Inui 51'; Zambrano (yellow card) 58'; Anderson Bamba 73'; Schwegler (yellow card) 88'	Stadium: Commerzbank-Arena; Attendance: 51,500; Referee: Florian Meyer

30 September 2012 6	Eintracht Frankfurt	2–1	SC Freiburg	Frankfurt
15:30 CEST	Meier 67', 73'; Schwegler (yellow card) 75'	(Report)	Makiadi (yellow card) 15'; Schuster (yellow card) 40'; Kruse 50'; Caligiuri (yellow card) 88'; Guédé (red card) 90+1'	Stadium: Commerzbank-Arena; Attendance: 49,300; Referee: Felix Brych

7 October 2012 7	Borussia Mönchengladbach	2–0	Eintracht Frankfurt	Mönchengladbach
15:30 CEST	Arango 8'; De Jong 24', (yellow card) 78'; Domínguez (yellow card) 61'; Marx (yellow card) 89'; Rupp (yellow card) 90+1'	(Report)		Stadium: Borussia-Park; Attendance: 51,193; Referee: Marco Fritz

20 October 2012 8	Eintracht Frankfurt	3–1	Hannover 96	Frankfurt
15:30 CEST	Matmour 5'; Jung 18'; Meier 82'	(Report)	Abdellaoue 43'	Stadium: Commerzbank-Arena; Attendance: 50,500; Referee: Christian Dingert

28 October 2012 9	VfB Stuttgart	2–1	Eintracht Frankfurt	Stuttgart
15:30 CEST	Gentner 6'; Ibišević 84'	(Report)	Meier 67'	Stadium: Mercedes-Benz Arena; Attendance: 54,840; Referee: Peter Gagelmann

2 November 2012 10	Eintracht Frankfurt	1–1	Greuther Fürth	Frankfurt
20:30 CEST	Meier 1'	(Report)	Stieber 53'	Stadium: Commerzbank-Arena; Attendance: 47,400; Referee: Markus Schmidt

10 November 2012 11	Bayern Munich	2–0	Eintracht Frankfurt	Munich
15:30 CEST	Ribéry 44'; Alaba 77' (pen.)	(Report)		Stadium: Allianz Arena; Attendance: 71,000; Referee: Marco Fritz

17 November 2012 12	Eintracht Frankfurt	4–2	FC Augsburg	Frankfurt
15:30 CEST	Mölders 7' (o.g.); Aigner 32'; Meier 52' 75' (pen.)	(Report)	Koo 42'; Mölders 64'	Stadium: Commerzbank-Arena; Attendance: 47,700; Referee: Florian Meyer

24 November 2012 13	Schalke 04	1–1	Eintracht Frankfurt	Gelsenkirchen
15:30 CEST	Huntelaar 11'	(Report)	Aigner 13'; Matmour (red card) 90'	Stadium: Veltins-Arena; Attendance: 61,673; Referee: Günter Perl

27 November 2012 14	Eintracht Frankfurt	1–3	Mainz 05	Frankfurt
20:00 CEST	Szalai 55' (o.g.)	(Report)	Ivanschitz 18'; Parker 42'; Noveski 52'; Baumgartlinger (red card) 88'	Stadium: Commerzbank-Arena; Attendance: 47,800; Referee: Wolfgang Stark

30 November 2012 15	Fortuna Düsseldorf	4–0	Eintracht Frankfurt	Düsseldorf
20:30 CEST	Reisinger 38'; Fink 42'; Rafael 58'; Bellinghausen 85'	(Report)	Matmour (red card) 34'	Stadium: Esprit Arena; Attendance: 51,345; Referee: Michael Weiner

8 December 2012 16	Eintracht Frankfurt	4–1	Werder Bremen	Frankfurt
15:30 CEST	Meier 47'; Schwegler 62'; Aigner 63'; Inui 90'	(Report)	Petersen 54'	Stadium: Commerzbank-Arena; Attendance: 51,500; Referee: Deniz Aytekin

15 December 2012 17	VfL Wolfsburg	0–2	Eintracht Frankfurt	Wolfsburg
15:30 CEST	Josué (red card) 15'	(Report)	Meier 12'; Inui 18'	Stadium: Volkswagen Arena; Attendance: 26,452; Referee: Peter Gagelmann

19 January 2013 18	Bayer Leverkusen	3–1	Eintracht Frankfurt	Leverkusen
15:30 CEST	Boenisch 31'; Kießling 33'; Schürrle 58'	(Report)	Meier 78'	Stadium: BayArena; Attendance: 28,767; Referee: Wolfgang Stark

26 January 2013 19	Eintracht Frankfurt	2–1	1899 Hoffenheim	Frankfurt
15:30 CEST	Lanig 35'; Aigner 67'	(Report)	Volland 65'	Stadium: Commerzbank-Arena; Attendance: 38,100; Referee: Jochen Drees

2 February 2013 20	Hamburger SV	0–2	Eintracht Frankfurt	Hamburg
18:30 CEST		(Report)	Lakić 22', 36'	Stadium: Volksparkstadion; Attendance: 52,523; Referee: Felix Zwayer

9 February 2013 21	Eintracht Frankfurt	0–0	1. FC Nürnberg	Frankfurt
15:30 CEST		(Report)		Stadium: Commerzbank-Arena; Attendance: 45,400; Referee: Christian Dingert

16 February 2013 22	Borussia Dortmund	3–0	Eintracht Frankfurt	Dortmund
18:30 CEST	Reus 8', 10', 65'; Schieber (red card) 31'	(Report)	Inui (red card) 74'	Stadium: Westfalenstadion; Attendance: 80,500; Referee: Felix Brych

22 February 2013 23	SC Freiburg	0–0	Eintracht Frankfurt	Freiburg im Breisgau
20:30 CEST		(Report)		Stadium: Mage Solar Stadion; Attendance: 23,400; Referee: Peter Gagelmann

1 March 2013 24	Eintracht Frankfurt	0–1	Borussia Mönchengladbach	Frankfurt
20:30 CEST		(Report)	De Jong 22'	Stadium: Commerzbank-Arena; Attendance: 51,500; Referee: Deniz Aytekin

10 March 2013 25	Hannover 96	0–0	Eintracht Frankfurt	Hanover
15:30 CEST		(Report)		Stadium: AWD-Arena; Attendance: 44,800; Referee: Bastian Dankert

17 March 2013 26	Eintracht Frankfurt	1–2	VfB Stuttgart	Frankfurt
15:30 CEST	Aigner 17'	(Report)	Ibišević 49' (pen.); Niedermeier 71'	Stadium: Commerzbank-Arena; Attendance: 50,600; Referee: Peter Sippel

31 March 2013 27	Greuther Fürth	2–3	Eintracht Frankfurt	Fürth
17:30 CEST	Đurđić 2'; Sararer 72'	(Report)	Inui 12'; Aigner 58'; Meier 68'	Stadium: Trolli Arena; Attendance: 18,000; Referee: Jochen Drees

6 April 2013 28	Eintracht Frankfurt	0–1	Bayern Munich	Frankfurt
15:30 CEST		(Report)	Schweinsteiger 52'	Stadium: Commerzbank-Arena; Attendance: 51,500; Referee: Florian Meyer

14 April 2013 29	FC Augsburg	2–0	Eintracht Frankfurt	Augsburg
17:30 CEST	Ji 27', 55'	(Report)		Stadium: SGL Arena; Attendance: 30,660; Referee: Guido Winkmann

20 April 2013 30	Eintracht Frankfurt	1–0	Schalke 04	Frankfurt
15:30 CEST	Russ 41'	(Report)		Stadium: Commerzbank-Arena; Attendance: 51,500; Referee: Günter Perl

28 April 2013 31	Mainz 05	0–0	Eintracht Frankfurt	Mainz
15:30 CEST		(Report)		Stadium: Coface Arena; Attendance: 34,034; Referee: Knut Kircher

4 May 2013 32	Eintracht Frankfurt	3–1	Fortuna Düsseldorf	Frankfurt
15:30 CEST	Meier 30', 87'; Lakić 50'	(Report)	Schahin 78'	Stadium: Commerzbank-Arena; Attendance: 51,500; Referee: Peter Sippel

11 May 2013 33	Werder Bremen	1–1	Eintracht Frankfurt	Bremen
15:30 CEST	De Bruyne 22'	(Report)	Lakić 51'	Stadium: Weserstadion; Attendance: 42,100; Referee: Manuel Gräfe

18 May 2013 34	Eintracht Frankfurt	2–2	VfL Wolfsburg	Frankfurt
15:30 CEST	Meier 36' (pen.); Rodríguez 90' (o.g.)	(Report)	Polák 8'; Diego 19'	Stadium: Commerzbank-Arena; Attendance: 51,500; Referee: Felix Zwayer

=== DFB-Pokal ===
19 August 2012 1st Round	Erzgebirge Aue	3–0	Eintracht Frankfurt	Aue, Germany
16:00 CEST	Paulus 21' (pen.); Sylvestr 61', 90'	(report)	Trapp (red card) 19'	Stadium: Erzgebirgsstadion; Attendance: 9,575; Referee: Daniel Siebert

=== Indoor soccer tournament (Frankfurt Cup) ===
4 January 2013 1st Match	Eintracht Frankfurt	5–3	FC St. Pauli	Frankfurt, Germany
18:39 CEST	Djakpa 11'; Kouemaha 16'; Kittel 16'; Matmour 18'; Gyau 20' (o.g.)			Stadium: Fraport Arena; Attendance: 4,500

4 January 2013 2nd Match	Eintracht Frankfurt	2–2	Kickers Offenbach	Frankfurt, Germany
19:33 CEST	Djakpa 1'; Hoffer 4'			Stadium: Fraport Arena; Attendance: 4,500

4 January 2013 Semifinal	Eintracht Frankfurt	3–3 (3–5 p)	Greuther Fürth	Frankfurt, Germany
16:00 CEST	Stendera 3', 20'; Hoffer 14'	(report)		Stadium: Fraport Arena; Attendance: 4,500

4 January 2013 3rd place play-off	Eintracht Frankfurt	5–3	FSV Frankfurt	Frankfurt, Germany
21:43 CEST	Hoffer 4', 20'; Stendera 9'; Kittel 14', 16'			Stadium: Fraport Arena

== Squad ==
=== Squad and statistics ===
As of 5 June 2013

No.	Pos	Nat	Player	Total		Bundesliga		DFB-Pokal	
No.	Pos	Nat	Player	Apps	Goals	Apps	Goals	Apps	Goals
1	GK	(North Macedonia) MKD	Oka Nikolov	9	0	8	0	1	0
2	DF	(Peru) PER	Carlos Zambrano	30	0	30	0	0	0
3	DF	(Germany) GER	Heiko Butscher	4	0	3	0	1	0
4	DF	(Germany) GER	Marco Russ	10	1	10	1	0	0
4	DF	(Norway) NOR	Vadim Demidov	6	0	5	0	1	0
5	DF	(Germany) GER	Martin Amedick	0	0	0	0	0	0
6	DF	(Germany) GER	Bastian Oczipka	34	0	33	0	1	0
7	MF	(Germany) GER	Benjamin Köhler	7	0	6	0	1	0
8	MF	(Japan) JPN	Takashi Inui	34	6	33	6	1	0
9	FW	(Canada) CAN	Olivier Occéan	19	1	18	1	1	0
10	FW	(Austria) AUT	Erwin Hoffer	6	1	6	1	0	0
11	FW	(Croatia) CRO	Srđan Lakić	14	4	14	4	0	0
13	MF	(Germany) GER	Martin Lanig	19	3	19	3	0	0
14	MF	(Germany) GER	Alexander Meier	32	16	31	16	1	0
15	DF	(Ivory Coast) CIV	Constant Djapka	5	0	5	0	0	0
16	MF	(Germany) GER	Stefan Aigner	35	9	34	9	1	0
19	FW	(Cameroon) CMR	Dorge Kouemaha	2	0	2	0	0	0
20	MF	(Germany) GER	Sebastian Rode	34	0	33	0	1	0
21	MF	(Algeria) ALG	Karim Matmour	24	1	24	1	0	0
22	DF	(Germany) GER	Stefano Celozzi	28	0	27	0	1	0
23	DF	(Brazil) BRA	Anderson Bamba	28	1	28	1	0	0
24	DF	(Germany) GER	Sebastian Jung	33	1	32	1	1	0
27	MF	(Switzerland) SUI	Pirmin Schwegler	28	2	27	2	1	0
28	MF	(Germany) GER	Sonny Kittel	6	0	6	0	0	0
29	FW	(Canada) CAN	Rob Friend	0	0	0	0	0	0
31	GK	(Germany) GER	Kevin Trapp	27	0	26	0	1	0
32	GK	(Turkey) TUR	Aykut Özer	1	0	1	0	0	0
33	DF	(Germany) GER	Alexander Hien	0	0	0	0	0	0
34	DF	(Germany) GER	Erik Wille	0	0	0	0	0	0
36	DF	(Germany) GER	Marc-Oliver Kempf	2	0	2	0	0	0
37	MF	(Germany) GER	Marc Stendera	5	0	5	0	0	0
39	DF	(Germany) GER	Julian Dudda	0	0	0	0	0	0

=== Transfers ===
==== Summer transfers in ====
- Stefan Aigner from 1860 Munich
- Anderson Bamba from Borussia Mönchengladbach, was previously loaned
- Stefano Celozzi from VfB Stuttgart
- Ricardo Clark loan return from Stabæk
- Vadim Demidov from Real Sociedad
- Julian Dudda from Eintracht Frankfurt U19
- Alexander Hien from Eintracht Frankfurt U19
- Erwin Hoffer loaned from Napoli
- Takashi Inui from VfL Bochum
- Marc-Oliver Kempf from Eintracht Frankfurt U19
- Dorge Kouemaha loaned from Club Brugge
- Martin Lanig from 1. FC Köln
- Olivier Occéan from Greuther Fürth
- Bastian Oczipka from Bayer Leverkusen
- Marc Stendera from Eintracht Frankfurt U17
- Kevin Trapp from 1. FC Kaiserslautern
- Erik Wille from Eintracht Frankfurt U19
- Carlos Zambrano from FC St. Pauli

==== Summer transfers out ====
- Marcos Álvarez to Stuttgarter Kickers
- Habib Bellaïd to Sedan
- Caio to EC Bahia
- Ricardo Clark to Houston Dynamo
- Thomas Kessler loan return to 1. FC Köln
- Ümit Korkmaz to FC Ingolstadt
- Matthias Lehmann to 1. FC Köln
- Gordon Schildenfeld to Dynamo Moscow
- Dominik Schmidt to Preußen Münster
- Marcel Titsch-Rivero to 1. FC Heidenheim
- Georgios Tzavelas to Monaco

==== Winter transfers in ====
- Srđan Lakić loaned from VfL Wolfsburg
- Marco Russ loaned from VfL Wolfsburg

==== Winter transfers out ====
- Vadim Demidov loaned to Celta Vigo
- Rob Friend loaned to 1860 Munich
- Erwin Hoffer to 1. FC Kaiserslautern, was on loan from Napoli
- Benjamin Köhler to 1. FC Kaiserslautern
- Dorge Kouemaha to Gaziantepspor, was on loan from Club Brugge
