= Yaffa =

Yaffa may refer to:

- Élie Yaffa (born 1976), French rapper known as Booba
- Sami Yaffa (born 1963), Finnish bass guitarist
- Yusupha Yaffa (born 1996), Gambian footballer
- Yaffa Ben-Ari (fl. 2017–2021), Israeli diplomat
- Yaffa Eliach (1935–2016), American historian and writer
- Yaffa Yarkoni (1925–2012), Israeli singer

== See also ==
- Jaffa (disambiguation)
