= Lucas Piazon =

Brazilian footballer (born 1994)

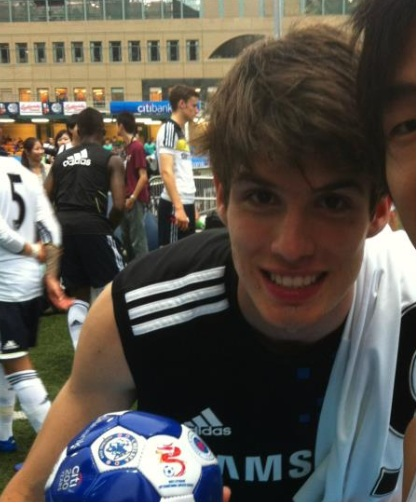
- Piazon with Chelsea in 2012

Personal information
- Full name: Lucas Domingues Piazon
- Date of birth: 20 January 1994 (age 32)
- Place of birth: São Paulo, Brazil
- Height: 1.84 m (6 ft 0 in)
- Positions: Winger; attacking midfielder; second striker

Team information
- Current team: Wieczysta Kraków
- Number: 12

Youth career
- 2001–2006: Coritiba
- 2007–2008: Atlético Paranaense
- 2008–2011: São Paulo
- 2011–2012: Chelsea

Senior career*
Years	Team	Apps	(Gls)
2012–2021	Chelsea	1	(0)
2012–2013	→ Málaga (loan)	11	(0)
2013–2014	→ Vitesse (loan)	29	(11)
2014–2015	→ Eintracht Frankfurt (loan)	22	(2)
2015–2016	→ Reading (loan)	23	(3)
2016–2018	→ Fulham (loan)	51	(10)
2019	→ Chievo (loan)	4	(0)
2019–2021	→ Rio Ave (loan)	27	(4)
2021–2024	Braga	30	(4)
2022–2023	→ Botafogo (loan)	29	(1)
2024–2025	AVS	30	(0)
2025–	Wieczysta Kraków	41	(6)
2025	Wieczysta Kraków II	1	(1)

International career
2009–2010	Brazil U15	7	(10)
2011	Brazil U17	15	(4)
2014	Brazil U20	3	(1)
2015	Brazil U23	5	(1)
Medal record
Representing Brazil
Men's Football
Pan American Games
Bronze medal – third place	2015 Toronto	Team competition
- * Club domestic league appearances and goals as of 13:16, 8 November 2026 (UTC)

Lucas Domingues Piazon (born 20 January 1994) is a Brazilian professional footballer who plays for Ekstraklasa club Wieczysta Kraków. A versatile player, he can be deployed as a winger, attacking midfielder, and as a second striker.

Piazon joined Chelsea from São Paulo in 2011 and was named Chelsea's Young Player of the Year in 2012, helping the club win the FA Youth Cup. He made his senior debut for Chelsea in June 2012, at the age of 18. His subsequent career included loan spells in England, Spain, the Netherlands, Germany, Italy, Portugal and Brazil. He helped English side Fulham earn promotion to the Premier League in 2018 and Portuguese club Rio Ave qualify for the UEFA Europa League qualifying rounds in 2020. After leaving Chelsea to join Braga permanently in January 2021, he won the Portuguese Cup that same year, scoring in the semi-final second leg against Porto and the final against Benfica. In 2026, he helped Wieczysta Kraków achieve their first promotion to the Ekstraklasa.

== Early life ==
Piazon was born on 20 January 1994 in São Paulo, Brazil, to António Carlos Piazon and Marizabel Domingues. He grew up with his younger sister, Juliana. He was a Chelsea supporter from an early age and aspired to play for the club.

Piazon began playing futsal for Coritiba at the age of eight before switching to outdoor football at eleven, eventually beginning his professional career in Brazil.

== Club career ==
=== Youth career ===
Piazon began his youth career with Coritiba. He made an impression with them becoming top scorer in every youth tournament he appeared in. In 2007, he moved to neighbouring club, Atlético Paranaense. He again turned out, as Atlético reached the finals of the U15 Copa do Brasil in 2008, which they eventually lost to São Paulo. São Paulo became very impressed with his performance and made an offer. At the age of 14, Piazon left his family behind in Curitiba and joined São Paulo. In May, he began to attract the attention of international scouts when he helped guide São Paulo through the Brazilian qualifiers for the Premier Cup (Nike Cup). It was around this time that he was also called up by Brazil's U-15s. In August, São Paulo travelled to Manchester for the Premier Cup finals. In the Group stage, Piazon scored in the 3–0 win versus Manchester United. São Paulo then went on to beat Werder Bremen in the final match.

=== Chelsea ===
Piazon joined Chelsea from São Paulo in August 2011. In his first season, he helped the club win the 2011–12 FA Youth Cup and was named Chelsea's Young Player of the Year.

He made his competitive first-team debut on 25 September 2012 in a 6–0 League Cup victory over Wolverhampton Wanderers, providing an assist for Ryan Bertrand. He made three competitive appearances for Chelsea during the 2012–13 season, featuring in victories over Wolves, Manchester United and Aston Villa.

==== Loan to Málaga ====
During the 2013 January transfer window, Piazon was loaned to Spanish La Liga side Málaga until the end of the season. He made his debut for Málaga on 24 January 2013, coming on as a substitute in the 4–2 home defeat in the Copa del Rey quarter-final against Barcelona. On 16 February, he assisted Javier Saviola's winner in a 1–0 home win against Athletic Bilbao. On 9 March 2013, Piazon made his second assist for Málaga with a ball from a free-kick that found Martín Demichelis, who headed to score in a 1–1 draw against Real Valladolid.

==== Loan to Vitesse ====
On 9 August 2013, Piazon was loaned to Eredivisie club Vitesse until the end of the 2013–14 season. On 17 August 2013, he made his debut for Vitesse in a 1–1 draw at Roda JC. On 22 September, Piazon scored his first goals in his professional career and for Vitesse, scoring a brace in the 3–0 win at home to PEC Zwolle. In the following Eredivisie fixture, against NEC, Piazon scored the winner for Vitesse in the 92nd minute, from outside the box, which ended 3–2 on 29 September. On 19 October 2013, he scored a brace and assisted Patrick van Aanholt's winner, as Vitesse came from 2–0 down to win 3–2 at Heerenveen. On 24 November, Piazon scored two penalties at Go Ahead Eagles in a 3–0 win. In Vitesse's fixture away to PSV on 7 December, Piazon scored another goal as Vitesse convincingly won 6–2 to stay at the top of the Eredivisie table. Piazon finished the 2013–14 season with 11 goals in 29 Eredivisie appearances for Vitesse.

==== Loan to Frankfurt ====
On 24 July 2014, Piazon moved to Germany, joining top-tier Bundesliga side Eintracht Frankfurt on loan from Chelsea for the remainder of the 2014–15 season. On 2 August, he scored his first goal in a 4–2 friendly win against Sampdoria. On 23 August, Piazon made his debut in the Bundesliga against SC Freiburg, a 1–0 victory. His first Bundesliga goal came on 28 September against Hamburger SV; having came off the bench in the 86th minute for Stefan Aigner, in the 90th minute he struck a free-kick from nearly 30 yards out to seal a 2–1 victory.

==== Loan to Reading ====
On 31 August 2015, Piazon joined Reading on a season-long loan deal. On 11 September, he made his debut and provided an assist to teammate Oliver Norwood in a 5–1 victory over Ipswich Town coming on as a 77th-minute substitute for Matěj Vydra. Fifteen days later, he scored his first goal for Reading in a 2–1 win against Burnley. Piazon returned to Chelsea on 28 April 2016, a week before his loan deal was due to expire.

==== Loan to Fulham ====
On 31 August 2016, Piazon joined Fulham on a season-long loan, joining Chelsea teammate Tomáš Kalas. He made his Fulham debut and scored his first goal for the club in a 2–1 EFL Cup defeat against Bristol City on 21 September. On 17 January 2017, Piazon's loan at Fulham was extended until the end of the season. On 14 July 2017, Piazon's loan was once again extended for a further season. On 15 August 2017, Piazon suffered a fracture-dislocation of his right ankle following a tackle from Leeds United player Conor Shaughnessy in Fulham’s 0–0 draw away at Elland Road. It was later reported that he underwent a successful surgery and rehabilitation. Across his two seasons at Fulham, Piazon scored ten goals in 51 regular-season Championship appearances. He helped the club win promotion to the Premier League through the play-offs in 2018.

==== Loan to Chievo ====
In January 2019, Piazon once again departed Chelsea, joining Italian side Chievo Verona on loan. He played four times for the club before returning to Chelsea at the expiration of his loan spell.

==== Loan to Rio Ave ====
On 2 September 2019, Piazon joined Portuguese side Rio Ave on a two-season loan deal, running until the end of the 2020–21 season. In the 2019–20 season, Piazon helped Rio Ave finish fifth in the Primeira Liga and qualify for the following season's UEFA Europa League qualifying rounds.

=== Braga ===
On 14 January 2021, Piazon left Chelsea after nine years, having been the longest serving player at the time, and signed for fellow Portuguese team Braga on a permanent deal. He agreed to a four-year contract with the club. On 3 March, Piazon scored in Braga’s 3–2 victory over Porto in the second leg of the Taça de Portugal semi-final, helping the club reach the final. On 23 May, he scored the opening goal in Braga’s 2–0 victory over Benfica in the final, helping the club win the trophy.

==== Loan to Botafogo ====
On 10 March 2022, Piazon joined Brazilian club Botafogo on loan from Braga until June 2023, returning to Brazil after eleven years in European football. On 20 April, Piazon scored his first goal for Botafogo in a 3–0 away victory over Ceilândia in the third round of the Copa do Brasil.

On 27 March 2023, Piazon started in Botafogo's 3–1 victory over Portuguesa in the second leg of the Taça Rio semi-finals, which secured the club's place in the final. Botafogo subsequently won the competition, defeating Audax Rio 7–3 on aggregate.

=== AVS ===
On 25 July 2024, Piazon returned to Portugal, subsequently leaving his home country, joining newly-promoted Primeira Liga club AVS. At the end of the 2024–25 season, AVS retained their place in the Primeira Liga after defeating Vizela 5–2 on aggregate in the relegation play-off.

=== Wieczysta Kraków ===
On 20 August 2025, Piazon departed Portugal, moving abroad to Poland, joining I liga side Wieczysta Kraków, and signed a two-year contract with the team. He was part of the squad that secured the club’s first promotion to the Ekstraklasa at the end of the 2025–26 season.

== International career ==
Piazon formerly represented Brazil at under-15, under-17, under-20 and under-23 levels.

Piazon finished as the leading goalscorer at the 2009 South American U15 Championship in Bolivia with ten goals, helping Brazil finish runners-up.

He was part of Brazil's squad that won the 2011 South American U17 Championship. At the 2011 FIFA U17 World Cup, Piazon scored and provided an assist in Brazil's 3–3 group-stage draw against Ivory Coast.

In 2014, Piazon was part of the Brazil squad that won the Toulon Tournament, scoring in a 7–0 group-stage victory over Qatar.

At the 2015 Pan American Games, he helped Brazil win the bronze medal, scoring the goal that put the team ahead in extra time during their 3–1 victory over Panama in the bronze-medal match.

== Style of play ==
Piazon has described his playing style as direct and focused on quick passing rather than prolonged dribbling, likening his approach to that of a midfielder playing further forward. A 2012 profile in the International Business Times highlighted his reading of the game and ability to create chances through incisive passing.

Early in his career, Piazon drew comparisons with compatriot and former attacking midfielder, Kaká. In an interview in 2026, he said that he regarded these comparisons as a compliment rather than a source of pressure, identifying Kaká and Ronaldinho as childhood inspirations.

== Personal life ==
Piazon is married to Elżbieta Kawalec, also known as Ela Kawalec, who is originally from Wrocław, Poland. The couple have two sons. In a 2025 interview, he said that his wife’s Polish roots and desire to return to her home country influenced his decision to play in Poland.

== Career statistics ==
As of match played 9 October 2026

Appearances and goals by club, season and competition
Club	Season	League			State league (Note: Includes Campeonato Carioca)		National cup (Note: Includes Copa del Rey, KNVB Cup, DFB-Pokal, FA Cup, Taça de Portugal, Copa do Brasil)		League cup (Note: Includes Football League Cup, Taça da Liga)		Continental		Other		Total	
Club	Season	Division	Apps	Goals	Apps	Goals	Apps	Goals	Apps	Goals	Apps	Goals	Apps	Goals	Apps	Goals
Chelsea	2012–13	Premier League	1	0	—		0	0	2	0	0	0	0	0	3	0
Chelsea	2018–19	Premier League	0	0	—		0	0	0	0	0	0	—		0	0
Chelsea	Total		1	0	—		0	0	2	0	0	0	0	0	3	0
Málaga (loan)	2012–13	La Liga	11	0	—		1	0	—		2 (Note: Appearances in UEFA Champions League)	0	—		14	0
Vitesse (loan)	2013–14	Eredivisie	29	11	—		2	0	—		—		—		31	11
Eintracht Frankfurt (loan)	2014–15	Bundesliga	22	2	—		1	0	—		—		—		23	2
Reading (loan)	2015–16	Championship	23	3	—		3	2	1	0	—		—		27	5
Fulham (loan)	2016–17	Championship	29	5	—		2	0	1	1	—		1	0	33	6
Fulham (loan)	2017–18	Championship	22	5	—		1	0	1	1	—		1	0	25	6
Fulham (loan)	Total		51	10	—		3	0	2	2	—		2	0	58	12
Chievo (loan)	2018–19	Serie A	4	0	—		0	0	—		—		—		4	0
Rio Ave (loan)	2019–20	Primeira Liga	19	2	—		3	1	2	1	—		—		24	4
Rio Ave (loan)	2020–21	Primeira Liga	8	2	—		1	0	0	0	3 (Note: Appearances in UEFA Europa League)	0	—		12	2
Rio Ave (loan)	Total		27	4	—		4	1	2	1	3	0	—		36	6
Braga	2020–21	Primeira Liga	20	4	—		4	2	1	0	2	0	—		27	6
Braga	2021–22	Primeira Liga	10	0	—		1	0	0	0	4	0	—		15	0
Braga	Total		30	4	—		5	2	1	0	6	0	—		42	6
Botafogo (loan)	2022	Série A	17	0	—		2	1	—		—		—		19	1
Botafogo (loan)	2023	Série A	1	0	11	1	2	0	—		0	0	—		14	1
Botafogo (loan)	Total		18	0	11	1	4	1	—		0	0	—		33	2
AVS	2024–25	Primeira Liga	30	0	—		0	0	0	0	—		2 (Note: Appearances in Primeira Liga promotion/relegation play-offs)	0	32	0
Wieczysta Kraków	2025–26	I liga	27	2	—		0	0	—		—		2 (Note: Appearances in I liga promotion play-offs)	0	29	2
Wieczysta Kraków	2026–27	Ekstraklasa	9	3	—		1	0	—		—		0	0	10	3
Wieczysta Kraków	Total		36	5	—		1	0	—		—		2	0	39	5
Career total			282	39	11	1	24	6	8	3	11	0	6	0	342	49

== Honours ==
Chelsea U18

- FA Youth Cup: 2011–12

Fulham

- EFL Championship play-offs: 2018

Braga

- Taça de Portugal: 2020–21

Botafogo

- Taça Rio: 2023

Wieczysta Kraków II

- IV liga Lesser Poland: 2025–26

Brazil U17

- South American U-17 Championship: 2011

Brazil U20

- Toulon Tournament: 2014

Brazil U23

- Pan American Games bronze medal: 2015

Individual

- Chelsea Young Player of the Year: 2011–12
