= Carlos Zambrano (footballer) =

Peruvian footballer (born 1989)

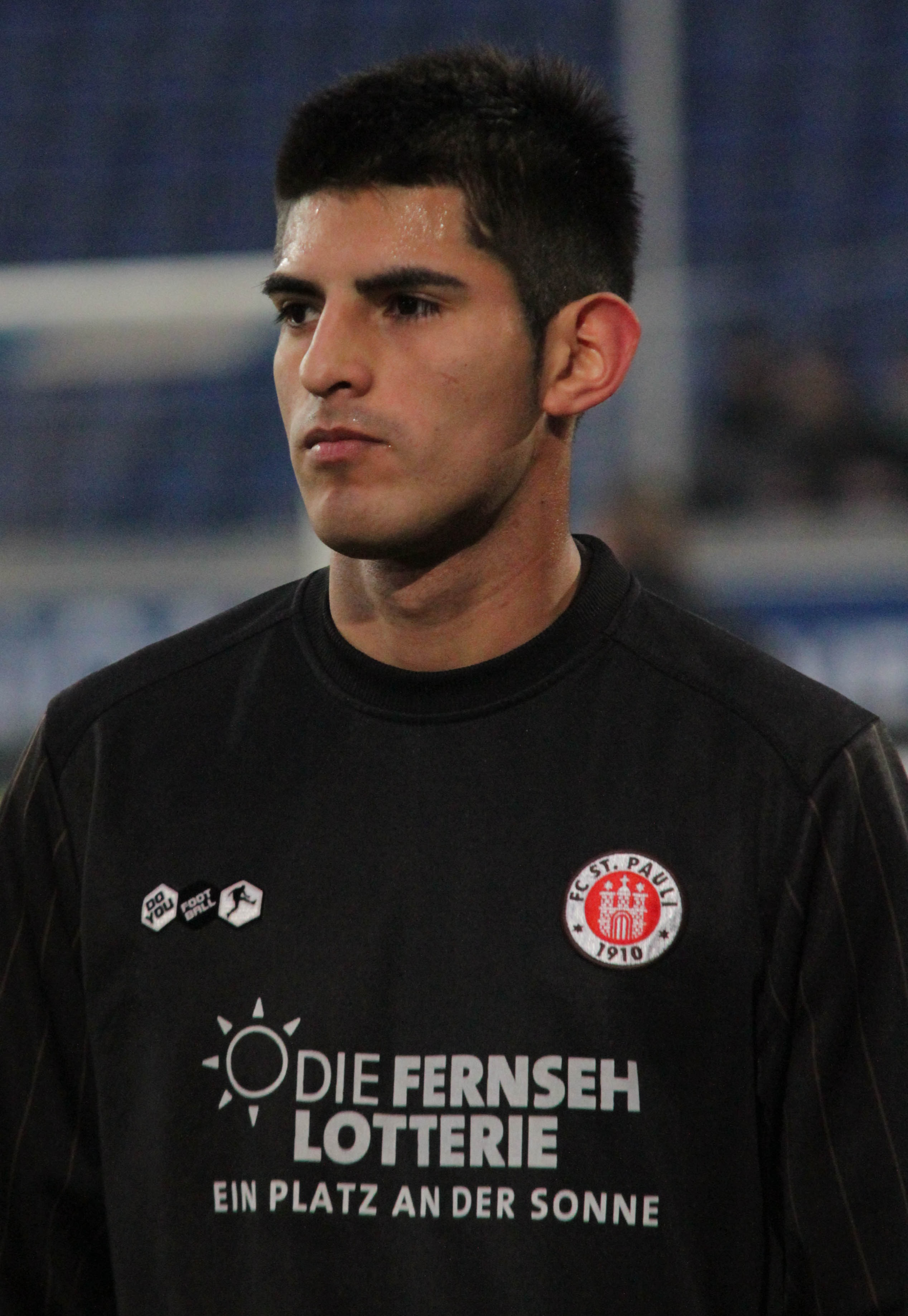
- Zambrano with FC St. Pauli in 2012

Personal information
- Full name: Carlos Augusto Zambrano Ochandarte
- Date of birth: 10 July 1989 (age 37)
- Place of birth: Callao, Peru
- Height: 1.85 m (6 ft 1 in)
- Position: Centre-back

Team information
- Current team: Sport Boys
- Number: 3

Youth career
- 2000–2006: AD Cantolao
- 2006–2008: Schalke 04

Senior career*
Years	Team	Apps	(Gls)
2008	Schalke 04 II	1	(0)
2008–2010	Schalke 04	16	(0)
2010–2012	FC St. Pauli	30	(1)
2012–2016	Eintracht Frankfurt	101	(0)
2016–2018	Rubin Kazan	21	(0)
2017	→ PAOK (loan)	6	(0)
2018–2019	Dynamo Kyiv	0	(0)
2018–2019	→ Basel (loan)	7	(1)
2020–2022	Boca Juniors	49	(2)
2023–2026	Alianza Lima	65	(5)
2026–	Sport Boys	7	(0)

International career^{‡}
2007–2008	Peru U20	2	(0)
2008–	Peru	83	(4)
Medal record
Men's football
Representing Peru
Copa América
Runner-up	2019 Brazil
Third place	2015 Chile
- * Club domestic league appearances and goals as of 21 June 2026 ‡ National team caps and goals as of 23:34, 9 September 2025 (UTC)

Carlos Augusto Zambrano Ochandarte (born 10 July 1989) is a Peruvian professional footballer who plays as a defender for Peruvian Primera División club Sport Boys and the Peru national football team. He is known for his strong tackling and defensive capabilities.

Zambrano's played for Alianza Lima between January 2023 and January 2026, being removed from the team due to allegations of sexual assault.

== Club career ==
=== Schalke 04 ===
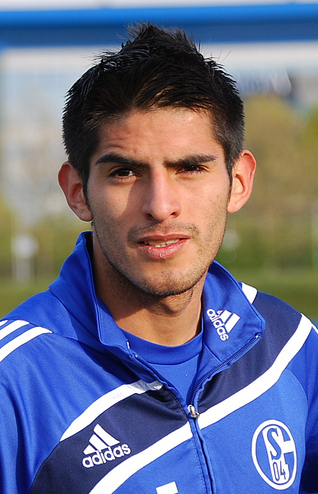
Zambrano pictured during his time at Schalke 04

Born in Callao, Peru, Zambrano started his football career at AD Cantolao since he was eleven. Zambrano joined Bundesliga club Schalke 04 at the age of 16 after playing in the U-17 World Cup in 2005, with Peru as hosts. He previously went on a trial with the club and made an impression that Schalke 04 signed him. He later reflected on leaving Peru for Germany, saying: "It was very difficult for me at the start because I had to leave my family behind. I wanted to make them proud by moving to Germany and becoming a pro. It gave me drive and made me stronger." Zambrano has been compared with Brazilian defender Lúcio for his style of play and great defense, offense, and speed. Zambrano immediately became a cornerstone in defence and an undisputed starter for the U-19 team and scored a large number of goals. He also became a captain for the U-19 team.

In November 2007, he was promoted to the Schalke 04 first team and appeared as an unused substitute against Hamburger SV on 10 November 2007. Following his good performance at the U19 side, Zambrano signed a four–year contract with the club at the end of the 2007–08 season. However, he spent the whole 2008–09 season on the substitute bench.

In the 2009–10 season, Zambrano finally got a big breakthrough when he made his Schalke 04’s first team debut, starting the whole game and scored his first goal, in a 4–0 win against Germania Windeck in the first round of the DFB Pokal. Zambrano made his league debut for the club, starting the whole game, in a 2–1 win against 1. FC Nürnberg in the opening game of the season. Since making his debut for the club, he received a handful of first team football for the side. Zambrano helped the side keep three consecutive clean sheets between 6 December 2009 and 18 December 2009. However, Zambrano soon found his playing time reduced, due to being suspended and facing his own injury concern. But he did made three more appearances, playing in the right–back position, later in the 2009–10 season. Zambrano went on to make twenty appearances and scoring once in all competitions.

=== FC St. Pauli ===
It was announced on 10 July 2010 that FC St. Pauli signed Zambrano on a two–year loan, with a purchase option included. Upon joining the club, where he was given a number five shirt, Zambrano said: "I am pleased that it is now perfect. It is a great team. They have just promoted, but have enough development potential. If you can continue working calmly, then maybe there is more in it than the fight against relegation I look forward to the great fans."

Zambrano made his FC St. Pauli debut, starting the whole game in a 1–0 loss against Chemnitzer FC in the first round of the DFB Pokal. He made his league debut for the club in the opening game of the season against SC Freiburg, starting the whole game and helped the side win 3–1. Since making his debut, he became a first team regular for the side, playing in the centre–back position. Zambrano played a role when he set up a goal for Gerald Asamoah to score the equaliser, as FC St. Pauli won 2–1 against Borussia Mönchengladbach on 21 September 2010. Zambrano then scored his first goal for the club, in a 3–1 loss against Eintracht Frankfurt on 30 October 2010. However, he suffered an injury that kept him out for a month. Zambrano made his return to the starting line–up against SC Freiburg on 15 January 2011 and helped the side draw 2–2. Later in the 2010–11 season, he continued to be sidelined, being suspended and then suffered a tendon ligament tear in his right thigh during a match against 1. FC Nürnberg, result in him sidelined for the rest of the season. Although the club was eventually relegated since being sidelined, Zambrano finished his first season, making twenty–one appearances and scoring once in all competitions.

Ahead of the 2011–12 season, Zambrano was linked with a move to TSG 1899 Hoffenheim, leading a disagreement between his parent club, Schalke 04, and TSG 1899 Hoffenheim. Eventually, the move came to nothing, as FC St. Pauli stated that he would remain at the club. However, Zambrano continued to be sidelined, as he was still recovering from his tendon ligament tear in his right thigh for the rest of the year. In December 2011, his parent club, Schalke 04, wanted to bring back Zambrano but this eventually came to nothing. It was not until on 4 February 2012 when he made his return to the first team, starting a match and played 45 minutes before being substituted at half time, in a 2–1 loss against Alemannia Aachen. Following his return, Zambrano regained his first team place for the next two months. It was announced on 1 April 2012 that FC St. Pauli signed him on a permanent basis. The next day on 2 April 2012, however, Zambrano was sent–off for a second bookable offence, in a 0–0 draw against Fortuna Düsseldorf. It also emerged that he spat at Sascha Rösler during the match, resulting in a three match suspension. After serving a four match suspension, Zambrano made his return to the starting line–up against Dynamo Dresden on 29 April 2012, starting the whole game in a 1–0 loss. At the end of the 2011–12 season, he went on to make ten appearances in all competitions.

=== Eintracht Frankfurt ===
It was announced on 17 August 2012 that Zambrano signed with Eintracht Frankfurt of the Bundesliga for an estimated fee of €1.2 million. Upon joining the club, he said: "Eintracht has a great tradition and is a good club in Germany, which is why I came to Frankfurt. I also really wanted to play first division."

Zambrano made his Eintracht Frankfurt debut, starting the whole game, in a 2–1 win against Bayer Leverkusen in the opening game of the season. He made a good start to the team by helping the side reach at the top of the table after winning the first four league matches of the season. Since making his debut for the club, Zambrano quickly became a first team regular for the side, playing in the centre–back position. Zambrano also started every match until he fractured his toe during a match against VfB Stuttgart on 29 October 2012 and was out for two weeks. It was not until 17 November 2012 when Zambrano returned to the starting line–up against FC Augsburg and started the whole game, in a 4–2 win. As the season progressed, the club soon lost their place in first place and eventually finished the season in sixth place, resulting in qualifying for the UEFA Europa League. During a 3–1 win against Fortuna Düsseldorf on 4 May 2013, Zambrano was caught on camera when he is suspected of having deliberately kicked his opponent Stelios Malezas against his right leg in the 57th minute. But no action was taken further against Zambrano after it was revealed that the incident did not clearly demonstrate “grossly anti-sports behaviour”. He also faced setback that saw him being suspended on two occasions and injuries but continued to regain his first team place in the starting line–up. In his first appearance at Eintracht Frankfurt, Zambrano made thirty appearances in all competitions.

Ahead of the 2013–14 season, Zambrano was linked to La Liga side Sevilla but the club responded that they do not wish to sell him. At the start of the 2013–14 season, he continued to be a first team regular for Eintracht Frankfurt, playing in the centre–back position. Zambrano played in both legs of the UEFA Europa League Play–Offs against Qarabağ, helping the side win 4–1 to qualify the Group Stage. He captained the side for the first time in his Eintracht Frankfurt's career, in a 2–1 loss against Borussia Dortmund on 1 September 2013. A month later on 3 October 2013, Zambrano set up the club's third goal of the game, in a 3–0 win against APOEL in a UEFA Europa League Group Stage match. Zambrano started in every match until he was suspended a match against Mainz 05 on 10 November 2013 for picking up five yellow cards this season. After serving a one match suspension, Zambrano returned to the starting line–up on 23 November 2013, in a 3–3 draw against Schalke 04. During a 1–0 loss against Borussia Dortmund in the quarter–finals of the DFB Pokal on 11 February 2014, he found himself in clashing with Robert Lewandowski throughout the match. As a result, Zambrano was dropped from the squad when Eintracht Frankfurt faced Borussia Dortmund three days, which resulted the opposition team won 4–0. As the 2013–14 season progressed, he continued to regain his first team place despite being the sidelined along the way. In his second season at Eintracht Frankfurt, Zambrano made forty–three appearances in all competitions.

At the start of the 2014–15 season, Zambrano was featured for the first five league matches of the season before suffering from a tonsillitis. He made his 100th Bundesliga appearance on 20 September 2014, in a 2–2 draw against Schalke 04. After recovering from tonsillitis, Zambrano made his return to the starting line–up, playing the whole game, in a 3–2 win against 1. FC Köln on 4 October 2014. However, he severely injured his knee which kept him out of action for the first half of the season. It was not until on 3 February 2015 when Zambrano returned to the starting line–up, playing the whole game, in a 1–1 draw against VfL Wolfsburg. In a follow–up match against FC Augsburg, he set up the club's second goal of the season, in a 2–2 draw. After serving a one match suspension, Zambrano's return was short–lived when he was sent–off for a second bookable offence, in a 3–1 loss against Mainz 05 on 21 February 2015. Despite suffering another injury later in the 2014–15 season, Zambrano continued to feature in the first team for the side. In his third season at Eintracht Frankfurt, Zambrano made seventeen appearances in all competitions.

Ahead of the 2015–16 season, Zambrano signed a one–year contract extension with the club, keeping him until 2016. At the start of the 2015–16 season, he continued to regain his first team place for the side. However, Zambrano found himself out of the starting line–up, due to international commitment and demotion to the substitute bench.< But he soon regained his first team place in the centre–back position for the next three months. Zambrano captained the side for the first time this, starting the whole game, in a 1–0 loss against Darmstadt on 6 December 2015. However, he missed the whole December, due to suspension and then injury. In January 2016, Zambrano was linked with a return to Schalke 04. Amid the transfer speculation, he made his return to the starting line–up, playing 90 minutes, in a 3–2 win against VfL Wolfsburg on 24 January 2016. Two weeks later, on 6 February 2016, however, Zambrano was sent–off for a second bookable offence, in a 4–2 loss against VfB Stuttgart. He later captained the side on two occasions between 2 April 2016 and 9 April 2016 against Bayern Munich and TSG Hoffenheim. Despite being sidelined on three separate occasions later in the season, Zambrano captained the side in the second leg of the Bundesliga play–offs against 1.FC Nuremberg, helping the side win 1–0 to avoid relegation. In his fourth season at Eintracht Frankfurt, he made twenty–seven appearances in all competitions.

=== Rubin Kazan ===
On 3 July 2016, Zambrano moved to Russia, signing with FC Rubin Kazan, for an estimated fee of €3 million.

Zambrano made his Rubin Kazan debut, starting the whole game, in a 1–1 draw against Orenburg on 27 August 2016. Since making his debut for the club, he became a first team regular for the next six matches for the side. However, he was sent–off for a second bookable offence, in a 3–1 loss against Terek Grozny on 22 October 2016. After serving a one match suspension, Zambrano made his return, starting the whole game, in a 3–2 win against FC Ufa on 5 November 2016. He then helped the side keep three consecutive clean sheets between 18 November 2016 and 30 November 2016. Zambrano continued to regain his first team place in the centre–back position. However by April, Zambrano found himself sidelined on two more occasions, although he started three matches. In his first season at Rubin Kazan, he went on to make twenty–four appearances in all competitions.

==== PAOK (loan) ====
On 1 September 2017, PAOK completed the signing of Zambrano from Rubin Kazan on loan until the end of 2017–18 season. It came after when Rubin Kazan wanted to sell him following their financial problems, regarding financial fair play.

Zambrano made his PAOK debut on 20 September 2017, starting the whole game, in a 2–1 win against Levadiakos in the Kypello Elladas. Four days later on 24 September 2017, he made his league debut for the club, starting the whole game once again, in a 1–0 win against PAS Giannina. Zambrano featured in the next four matches for the side. However, he was sent–off for a second bookable offence, in a 1–0 loss against AEK Athens on 5 November 2017 and never played for the club again. In December, it was reported PAOK were longer planning with Zambrano.

=== Dynamo Kyiv and loan to Basel ===
On 30 January 2018, Zambrano signed a four-year contract with Ukrainian club Dynamo Kyiv. Zambrano did not play a single game for his new club, therefore he was instead loaned out to FC Basel for the rest of the 2018–19 season. Due to an injury, Zambrano was not able to make his debut for Basel until 15 December in the match against Sion.

Under trainer Marcel Koller, Basel won the Swiss Cup in the 2018–19 season. In the first round Basel beat FC Montlingen 3–0, in the second round Echallens Région 7–2 and in the round of 16 Winterthur 1–0. In the quarter-finals Sion were defeated 4–2 after extra time and in the semi-finals Zürich were defeated 3–1. All these games were played away from home. The final was held on 19 May 2019 in the Stade de Suisse Wankdorf Bern against Thun. Striker Albian Ajeti scored the first goal, Fabian Frei the second for Basel, then Dejan Sorgić netted a goal for Thun, but the result was 2–1 for Basel. Zambrano played in two cup games, the semi-final and the final.

Between December 2018 and the end of May 2019 Zambrano played a total of just 12 games for Basel scoring one goal. Seven of these games were in the Swiss Super League, two in the Swiss Cup and three were friendly games. He scored his sole goal in the domestic league. Because of his lack of prominence in Switzerland and negligence from the Ukrainian giant, it was announced on 31 January 2020 that he agreed to leave the club. After leaving Dynamo Kyiv, Zambrano revealed that he did not see eye to eye with the club's management.

=== Boca Juniors ===
On the same he had his Dynamo Kyiv's contract terminated, Zambrano moved to Argentina to play for Boca Juniors. The transfer fee reported to have cost €1.8 million. He was presented at the club's the official photo team ahead of the 2020 season.

Zambrano made his Boca Juniors debut on 4 March 2020, where he started and played 66 minutes before being substituted, in a 1–1 draw against Caracas. Four days later on 8 March 2020, Zambrano made his league debut for the club, again starting and played 68 minutes before being substituted, in a 1–0 win against Gimnasia LP, resulting Boca Juniors becoming champions. However, he suffered a fracture rib that kept him sidelined for month, but recovered by April. Zambrano rescinded his contract with Boca Juniors in December 2022, after arguing with coach Hugo Ibarra, who had previously separated him from the senior squad due to acts of indiscipline.

=== Alianza Lima ===
After terminating his contract with Boca Juniors, Zambrano joined Club Alianza Lima on 8 January 2023. Prior to his appointment at Alianza Lima, he stated in an interview that he had been previously offered from clubs in Uruguay, Brazil and the United States but declined them due to wanting Alianza Lima to win their third championship title in a row at the Peruvian Primera División as well as the club's participation in the 2023 Copa Libertadores.

On 23 January 2026, Zambrano was accused of sexually assaulting a young Argentinian woman along with two other club teammates (Miguel Trauco and Sergio Peña) following a team event in Montevideo, Uruguay. He was subsequently removed from the team.

== International career ==
=== Youth career ===
In September 2005, Zambrano was called up to the Peru U17 squad for the FIFA U-17 World Championship. He made three appearances, as the U17 side were eliminated in the Group Stage. He later made three appearances for the Peru U20 side.

=== Senior career ===
On 26 March 2008, Zambrano made his senior international debut for the Peru national team in a friendly match against Costa Rica. Zambrano started the match and scored a goal in the 45th minute. He later started three more World Cup Qualifying matches for the national side by the end of the year.

Zambrano was chosen to participate in the 2011 Copa América, but an injury suffered against Senegal in a friendly game, days before the tournament began, kept him out. A year later on 11 September 2012, Zambrano scored his first goal in the 2014 World Cup Qualifiers against Argentina on the 22nd minute, making it a one-goal lead over Argentina. The game would later end as a tie. After the match, Spanish speaking media around the world praised his performance. However, this was overshadowed over claims from Peruvian media that Zambrano made a slur to Lionel Messi during the match, a claim he denied. In a 2–0 loss against Colombia on 11 June 2013, Zambrano was sent–off for a second bookable offence. Three months later on 11 September 2013, he scored the national side's second goal of the game, in a 3–2 loss against Venezuela. It was announced on 4 November 2013 that Zambrano would be away from playing for the national side.

It was not until on 15 August 2014 when Zambrano would be called up to the national side once again. His first national appearance in ten months came on 4 September 2014, starting the whole game, in a 2–0 win against Iraq. Seven months later on 1 April 2015, Zambrano captained the national side for the first time in his career, as Peru lost 1–0 against Venezuela. Two months later, he was selected to be in Copa América held in Chile. Zambrano became the national side's first choice centre–back throughout the tournament. He then helped Peru keep two clean sheets in the Group Stage, resulting Peru progressing through to the knockout stage. However in the semi–finals of the Copa América against Chile, Zambrano was sent–off in the 20th minute for an unprofessional foul on Charles Aránguiz, as they lost 1–0. While serving his suspension, Peru went on to finish third place in the tournament after beating Paraguay 2–0. Zambrano later made seven appearances for the side between September 2015 and March 2016. Following this, he went on a three year absence from the international team. Zambrano reflected on his absence, saying: "When Gareca did not call me it was because he had no continuity and had lost the desire to play soccer. When you go to the national team you have to go with joy and contribute to your country. Always discuss it with him (Ricardo Gareca ), we tell each other things in confidence. It was important to return to the team after a long time and I did it in a great way, I trusted myself a lot. When I wasn't there I was aware that I didn't deserve it. I came back in a great moment."

In May 2019, Zambrano was named in Peru's final 23-man squad for the 2019 Copa América by manager Ricardo Gareca, earning his first call–up in three years. He made his first national appearance in three years, starting the whole game, in a 0–0 draw against Venezuela on 15 June 2019. Despite suffering from an injury, Zambrano became the national side first choice centre–back position and helped Peru reach the final of the Copa América. He appeared in the 2019 Copa América Final against hosts Brazil on 7 July, at the Maracanã Stadium; the match eventually ended in a 3–1 victory to Brazil.

== Personal life ==
Growing up in Callao, Peru, Zambrano revealed his childhood, saying: "As a child, I was always on the street, playing with friends with a glass ball. Usually we played right on the ground. When I come to Peru, I visit my friends — we no longer live in that dangerous area, but in a more peaceful place — we often play this game. We feel like children." He also supported Alianza Lima growing up and hoped to play for the club one day.

In addition to speaking Spanish, Zambrano speaks German, having learnt the language during his time in Germany. He also began learning Russian since moving to Rubin Kazan. In December 2017, Zambrano announced on social media his marriage to Marcia Succar. Together, they have three children.

Zambrano is good friends with Jefferson Farfán, having become teammates at Schalke 04 and the national side. In November 2017, during his time at PAOK, he escaped unhurt following collision with a truck.

== Career statistics ==
=== Club ===
As of match played 25 August 2025

Appearances and goals by club, season, and competition
Club	Season	League			National cup		Continental		Other		Total	
Club	Season	Division	Apps	Goals	Apps	Goals	Apps	Goals	Apps	Goals	Apps	Goals
Schalke 04 II	2008–09	Regionalliga West	1	0	—		—		—		1	0
Schalke 04	2009–10	Bundesliga	16	0	4	1	0	0	—		20	1
St. Pauli	2010–11	Bundesliga	20	1	1	0	—		—		21	1
St. Pauli	2011–12	2. Bundesliga	10	0	0	0	—		—		10	0
St. Pauli	Total		30	1	1	0	—		—		31	1
Eintracht Frankfurt	2012–13	Bundesliga	30	0	0	0	—		—		30	0
Eintracht Frankfurt	2013–14	Bundesliga	30	0	4	0	9 (Note: Appearances in UEFA Europa League)	0	—		43	0
Eintracht Frankfurt	2014–15	Bundesliga	17	0	0	0	—		—		17	0
Eintracht Frankfurt	2015–16	Bundesliga	24	0	2	0	—		1 (Note: Appearance in relegation play-offs)	0	27	0
Eintracht Frankfurt	Total		101	0	6	0	9	0	1	0	117	0
Rubin Kazan	2016–17	Russian Premier League	21	0	3	0	—		—		24	0
Rubin Kazan	2017–18	Russian Premier League	0	0	0	0	—		—		0	0
Rubin Kazan	Total		21	0	3	0	0	0	0	0	24	0
PAOK (loan)	2017–18	Super League Greece	6	0	2	0	—		—		8	0
Dynamo Kyiv	2017–18	Ukrainian Premier League	0	0	0	0	—		—		0	0
Basel (loan)	2018–19	Swiss Super League	7	1	2	0	—		—		9	1
Boca Juniors	2019–20	Argentine Primera División	1	0	0	0	1 (Note: Appearances in Copa Libertadores)	0	—		2	0
Boca Juniors	2020–21	Argentine Primera División	10	1	4	0	—		10 (Note: Appearances in Maradona Cup)	0	23	1
Boca Juniors	2021	Argentine Primera División	14	1	0	0	1	0	—		15	1
Boca Juniors	2022	Argentine Primera División	24	0	0	0	4	0	1 (Note: Appearances in Trofeo de Campeones de la Liga Profesional)	0	29	0
Boca Juniors	Total		49	2	4	0	6	0	1	0	70	2
Alianza Lima	2023	Peruvian Primera División	20	2	0	0	5	0	—		25	2
Alianza Lima	2024	Peruvian Primera División	24	3	0	0	6	0	—		30	3
Alianza Lima	2025	Peruvian Primera División	13	0	0	0	12 (Note: Nine appearances in Copa Libertadores, three appearance in Copa Sudamericana)	0	—		26	0
Alianza Lima	Total		57	5	0	0	24	0	—		81	5
Career total			288	9	22	1	39	0	12	0	361	10

=== International ===
As of match played on 9 September 2025

Appearances and goals by national team and year
National team	Year	Apps	Goals
Peru	2008	4	1
Peru	2009	7	0
Peru	2010	4	0
Peru	2012	5	1
Peru	2013	6	1
Peru	2014	2	1
Peru	2015	13	0
Peru	2016	1	0
Peru	2019	10	0
Peru	2020	2	0
Peru	2021	2	0
Peru	2022	8	0
Peru	2023	5	0
Peru	2024	10	0
Peru	2025	4	0
Total		83	4

#	Date	Venue	Opponent	Score	Result	Competition
1.	26 March 2008	Estadio Max Augustín, Iquitos, Peru	Costa Rica	2–1	3–1	Friendly
2.	11 September 2012	Estadio Nacional, Lima, Peru	Argentina	1–0	1–1	WCQ 2014
3.	10 September 2013	Estadio Anzoátegui, Puerto la Cruz, Venezuela	Venezuela	3–2	3–2	WCQ 2014
4.	4 September 2014	Dubai Club Stadium, Dubai, United Arab Emirates	Iraq	0–2	0–2	Friendly

== Honours ==
PAOK

- Greek Cup: 2017–18

Boca Juniors

- Primera División: 2019–20, 2022
- Copa Argentina: 2019–20
- Copa de la Liga Profesional: 2020, 2022

Peru

- Copa América: Second place 2019, Third place 2015
