= Enis Bunjaki =

German footballer (born 1997)

Personal information
- Full name: Enis Ibush Bunjaki
- Date of birth: 17 October 1997 (age 29)
- Place of birth: Offenbach am Main, Germany
- Height: 1.78 m (5 ft 10 in)
- Position: Forward

Youth career
- –2011: Kickers Offenbach
- 2011–2015: Eintracht Frankfurt

Senior career*
Years	Team	Apps	(Gls)
2015–2016	Eintracht Frankfurt	0	(0)
2017	Twente II	4	(0)
2017	Twente	2	(0)
2018–2019	TSV Eintracht Stadtallendorf	5	(0)
2019–2022	Hessen Dreieich	30	(6)

International career
2014	Kosovo	2	(0)
2014–2015	Germany U18	7	(4)
2015–2016	Germany U19	8	(5)
2016	Germany U20	3	(0)
- * Club domestic league appearances and goals as of 03:21, 4 July 2024 (UTC)

Enis Ibush Bunjaki (born 17 October 1997) is a professional footballer who plays as a forward. Born in Germany, he made two appearances for the Kosovo national team in 2014 before representing Germany at youth levels U18, U19 and U20.

== Club career ==
=== Early career ===
Bunjaki was born in Offenbach am Main, Germany from Kosovar-Albanian parents. He started his youth career at hometown club Kickers Offenbach. Then he moved to Eintracht Frankfurt academies in 2011 and two years later he was promoted to U17 side where he stood for two years. In 2014 without completing the age of 17, Bunjaki was promoted to the U19 team. With Eintracht Frankfurt U19 in the 2014–15 season Bunjaki scored 15 goals in 25 appearances. His performances caught the eye of the coach of the Eintracht Frankfurt first team Thomas Schaaf, which often brought him for training with the first team, while also enabled through friendly matches, while then the new appointed Eintracht Frankfurt's coach Armin Veh, has estimated extremely young striker, advising the club to offer a contract professional. Bunjaki played for the Eintracht Frankfurt first team under the coach Thomas Schaaf on 10 July 2014 on day four of SGE's first training camp this summer on Norderney island. Eintracht Frankfurt beat local team TuS Norderney 10–0 and Bunjaki also scored two goals after coming on as a substitute at half-time in place of Takashi Inui.

=== Eintracht Frankfurt ===
On 22 June 2015, Bunjaki signed his first professional contract of career with Eintracht Frankfurt for 2+1 years. The contract took effect on 17 October 2015 on Bunjaki's 18th birthday but he would have entry to the first team on 1 July 2015 when the new season officially starts.

=== Twente ===
Bunjaki signed with Dutch side FC Twente on 31 January 2017. He made his debut on 5 February 2017 against Feyenoord.

== International career ==
=== Kosovo ===
Bunjaki was called up to Kosovo national team for friendly matches against Turkey and Senegal in May 2014. He made it his debut for Kosovo on 25 May 2014 against Senegal in a 3–1 loss coming on as a substitute in place of the goalscorer Albert Bunjaku. Bunjaki was called up for another Kosovo's friendly match against Oman on 7 September 2014. Against Oman, he came in as a substitute in the 83rd minute for Bersant Celina and the match finished as a historical 1–0 victory since being first from where FIFA permitted their matches.

=== Germany youth teams ===
Bunjaki participated in seven friendly matches with Germany U18, where he scored four goals between 2014 and 2015. He advanced at Germany U19 and the next year at Germany U20 after another year.

== Career statistics ==
=== Club ===
As of 18:28, 5 February 2017 (UTC)

Appearances and goals by club, season and competition
Season	Club	League			Cup		Europe		Total	
Season	Club	Division	Apps	Goals	Apps	Goals	Apps	Goals	Apps	Goals
Eintracht Frankfurt	2016–17	Bundesliga	0	0	0	0	—	—	0	0
Twente	2016–17	Eredivisie	3	0	0	0	—	—	1	0
Career total			3	0	0	0	—	—	3	0

=== International ===
As of 7 September 2014

Appearances and goals by national team and year
National team	Year	Apps	Goals
Kosovo	2014	2	0
Total		2	0
