= Marc Stendera =

German footballer (born 1995)

Personal information
- Date of birth: 10 December 1995 (age 30)
- Place of birth: Kassel, Germany
- Height: 1.73 m (5 ft 8 in)
- Position: Midfielder

Team information
- Current team: SKN St. Pölten
- Number: 10

Youth career
- 1999–2007: TSV Heiligenrode
- 2007–2010: OSC Vellmar
- 2010–2012: Eintracht Frankfurt

Senior career*
Years	Team	Apps	(Gls)
2012–2019	Eintracht Frankfurt	78	(5)
2014	Eintracht Frankfurt II	1	(0)
2019–2020	Hannover 96	14	(0)
2020–2022	FC Ingolstadt 04	46	(2)
2023	VfB Oldenburg	13	(1)
2023–	SKN St. Pölten	80	(12)

International career
2011–2012	Germany U17	5	(3)
2012–2013	Germany U18	2	(2)
2013–2014	Germany U19	15	(4)
2014–2015	Germany U20	8	(5)
2015	Germany U21	2	(0)
Medal record
Winner	European U19 Championship	2014
- * Club domestic league appearances and goals as of 17 May 2026

Marc Stendera (born 10 December 1995) is a German professional footballer who plays as a midfielder for Austrian club SKN St. Pölten.

== Club career ==
During the 2012–13 season he had his first Bundesliga appearance when Eintracht played Bayern Munich at home when he was substituted for Marco Russ in the 71st minute. Stendera had the assist in Frankfurt's 1–0 (Russ) win against Schalke 04 on 21 April 2013, his first start in the Bundesliga.

Stendera amassed 56 appearances and scored 5 goals for Eintracht throughout the 2014–15 and 2015–16 seasons, but a series of injuries limited his first-team action during his three last years at the club. He was released from his contract on 2 September 2019 and joined Hannover 96 on the following day.

On 28 December 2022, Stendera agreed to join 3. Liga club VfB Oldenburg on a contract from 2 January 2023.

In June 2023, Stendera signed a two-year contract with SKN St. Pölten in Austria.

== International career ==
Stendera represented the Germany national youth football team at U17, U18 and U19 level. He was with the Germany U17 side in 2012 which made it to the final of the UEFA European U17 Championship but lost to the Netherlands on penalties. Stendera also represented Germany U19 in Hungary 2014. He made four assists, one of which came in the final against Portugal. Germany won that match 1–0 with Hany Mukhtar's goal in 39th minute and secured their second U19 title after their 2008 triumph.

== Honours ==
Individual

- UEFA European Under-19 Championship: Team of the Tournament
- FIFA U-20 World Championship Bronze Boot: 2015
