= Ümit Ergirdi =

Turkish footballer (born 1981)

Personal information
- Date of birth: 5 November 1981 (age 44)
- Place of birth: Berlin, Germany
- Height: 1.72 m (5 ft 8 in)
- Position: Midfielder

Youth career
- MSV Normannia 08

Senior career*
Years	Team	Apps	(Gls)
–2005	BSV Hürriyet		
2005–2007	BFC Preussen	47	(12)
2007–2008	Tennis Borussia Berlin	22	(5)
2008–2010	SV Babelsberg 03	69	(9)
2011–2013	BFC Viktoria 1889	58	(18)
2013–2018	Viktoria Berlin	148	(41)
Total		344	(85)

Managerial career
- 2020–: Reinickendorfer Füchse
- * Club domestic league appearances and goals

Ümit Ergirdi (born 5 November 1981) is a Turkish former professional footballer.

Ergirdi was born in Berlin, Germany. He made five appearances in the 3. Liga for SV Babelsberg 03 before deciding to end his professional career and to finish his law studies at the Free University of Berlin.
