= Anderson Bamba =

Brazilian footballer (born 1988)

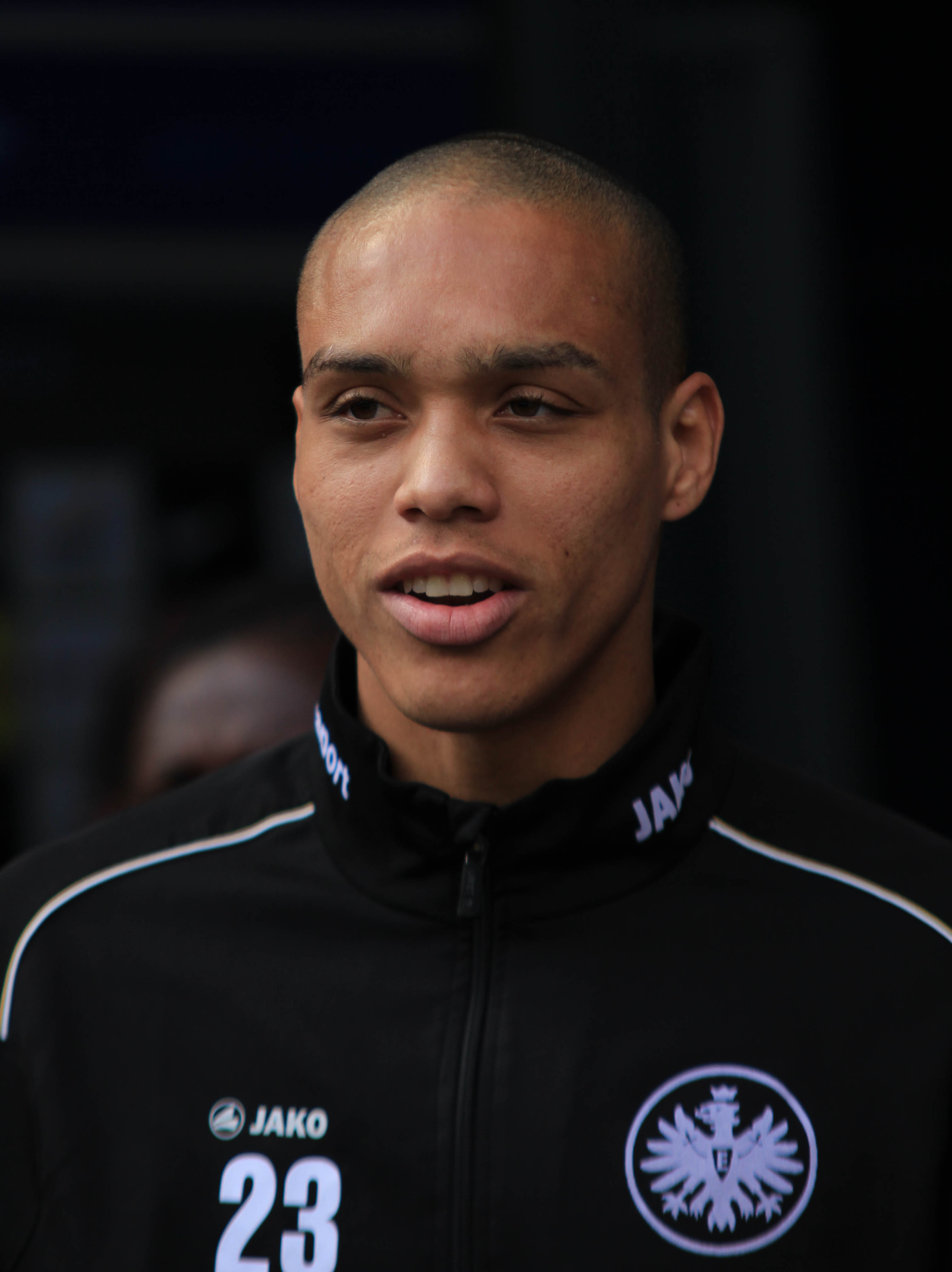
- Anderson in 2012

Personal information
- Full name: Anderson Soares de Oliveira
- Date of birth: 10 January 1988 (age 38)
- Place of birth: São Gonçalo, Brazil
- Height: 1.88 m (6 ft 2 in)
- Position: Centre back

Youth career
- –2008: Flamengo

Senior career*
Years	Team	Apps	(Gls)
2006–2008	Flamengo	0	(0)
2008	Tombense	0	(2)
2008–2010	Bayer Leverkusen	0	(0)
2008–2009	→ VfL Osnabrück (loan)	12	(0)
2009–2010	→ Fortuna Düsseldorf (loan)	32	(3)
2010–2011	Borussia Mönchengladbach	13	(0)
2011–2017	Eintracht Frankfurt	95	(1)
Total		152	(6)
- * Club domestic league appearances and goals

Anderson Soares de Oliveira or simply Anderson Bamba (born 10 January 1988) is a Brazilian former professional football central defender.

== Career ==
=== Flamengo ===
Anderson Oliveira started his career with Clube de Regatas do Flamengo. He excelled in winning the third championship of the junior state championship and the Junior Cup OPG.

Anderson began his career professional in 2006, with Flamengo and was sold to Tombense in January 2008.

=== Germany ===
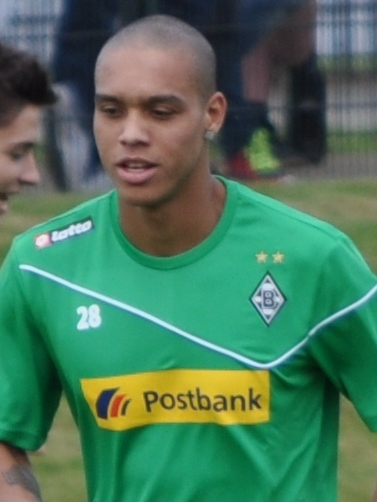
Anderson Bamba at Gladbach

In the summer 2008, German club Bayer Leverkusen secured the transfer rights to Anderson. He played the 2008–09 season for VfL Osnabrück, "on loan" from Bayer Leverkusen despite the fact that he did not have a contract with the Bundesliga club. On 1 July 2009, he agreed to be loaned to Fortuna Düsseldorf for the 2009–10 season.

On 1 April 2010, he signed with Borussia Mönchengladbach and joined his new team on 1 July. After one season in Gladbach, Anderson was loaned to the newly relegated Eintracht Frankfurt.

In April 2017 he agreed the termination of his contract with Eintracht Frankfurt which was due to run out in June 2018

== Honours ==
Flamengo

- Brazilian Cup: 2006
- Campeonato Carioca de Juniores: 2006, 2007
- Taça Otávio Pinto Guimarães: 2006, 2007
