= Joel Gerezgiher =

German footballer

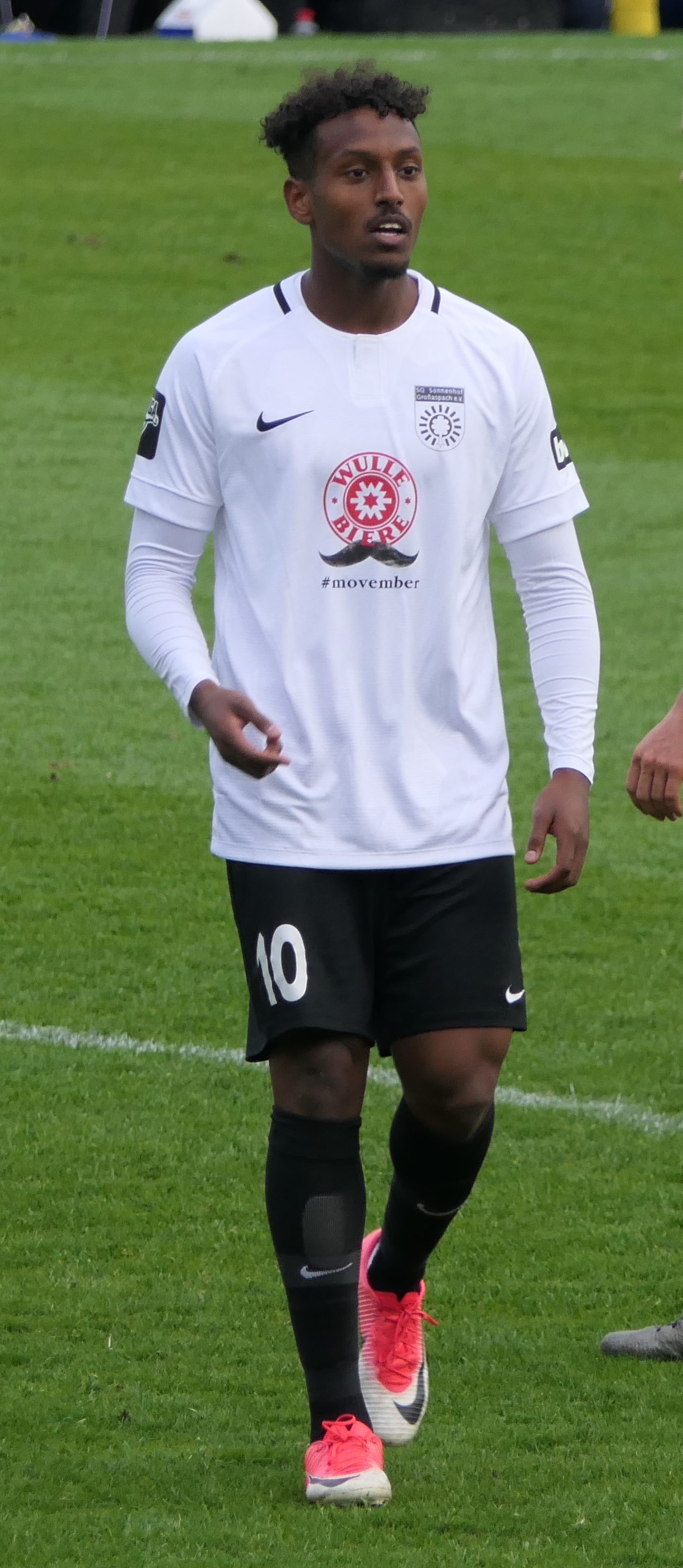

Personal information
- Date of birth: 9 October 1995 (age 31)
- Place of birth: Frankfurt, Germany
- Height: 1.77 m (5 ft 10 in)
- Position: Attacking midfielder

Team information
- Current team: SGV Freiberg
- Number: 32

Youth career
- 2001–2008: SV Niederursel
- 2008–2012: FSV Frankfurt
- 2012–2014: Eintracht Frankfurt

Senior career*
Years	Team	Apps	(Gls)
2014–2017	Eintracht Frankfurt	3	(0)
2016	→ FSV Frankfurt (loan)	2	(0)
2017–2018	Holstein Kiel	7	(2)
2018–2022	SG Sonnenhof Großaspach	65	(6)
2022–2023	FC 08 Homburg	27	(6)
2023–	SGV Freiberg	23	(2)
- * Club domestic league appearances and goals as of 29 April 2024

Joel Gerezgiher (born 9 October 1995) is an Eritrean footballer who plays as an attacking midfielder for SGV Freiberg. He was born in Frankfurt, Germany to Eritrean parents.

== Career ==
Gerezgiher started his career in 2001 at the local club SV Niederursel and moved to the FSV Frankfurt academy in 2008. After four years in Bornheim he signed for the Eintracht Frankfurt U-19. For the 2014–15 season he signed a professional contract but did not play due to several injuries. In March 2015 Gerezgiher extended his Vertrag until 2018. On 8 August 2015, he made his first professional appearance during the 3–0 victory at Bremer SV in the first round of the DFB-Pokal. One week later he played his first Bundesliga match on 16 August 2015 when he was substituted for Marco Russ as Eintracht lost 1–2 at VfL Wolfsburg. He was loaned to FSV Frankfurt on 21 January 2016.
