= Yusupha Yaffa =

Gambian footballer (born 1996)

Personal information
- Date of birth: 31 December 1996 (age 29)
- Place of birth: Serekunda, Gambia
- Height: 1.83 m (6 ft 0 in)
- Position: Forward

Youth career
- –2014: Milan
- 2014: → Bologna (loan)
- 2015: Eintracht Frankfurt

Senior career*
Years	Team	Apps	(Gls)
2015–2016	MSV Duisburg II	11	(1)
2021	Triestina	0	(0)
2022	Tsarsko Selo	4	(0)
- * Club domestic league appearances and goals as of 20:06, 21 May 2022 (UTC)

Yusupha Yaffa (born 31 December 1996) is a Gambian professional footballer who plays as a forward.

== Career ==
As a youth player, Yaffa joined the youth academy of Serie A side Milan, and, before 2015, joined the youth academy of Bundesliga club Eintracht Frankfurt on a six-month deal. In 2015, he signed for German fifth tier club MSV Duisburg II.

Before the second half of 2021–22, Yaffa signed for Tsarsko Selo in the Bulgarian top flight after trialing for Polish team Korona Kielce. On 25 February 2022, he debuted for Tsarsko Selo during a 1–0 loss to Lokomotiv Plovdiv. On 21 May 2022, in the last match of the season, Tsarsko Selo got a penalty that could bring them the win and save the team from relegation. Yaffa decided to take the penalty despite Martin Kavdanski being the regular penalty taker. Yaffa was ready to take the penalty when the owner of the team, Stoyne Manolov, entered the pitch and fought with him. He left the pitch and Kavdanski took the penalty, but missed and the team was relegated.
