= Stefan Aigner =

German footballer (born 1987)

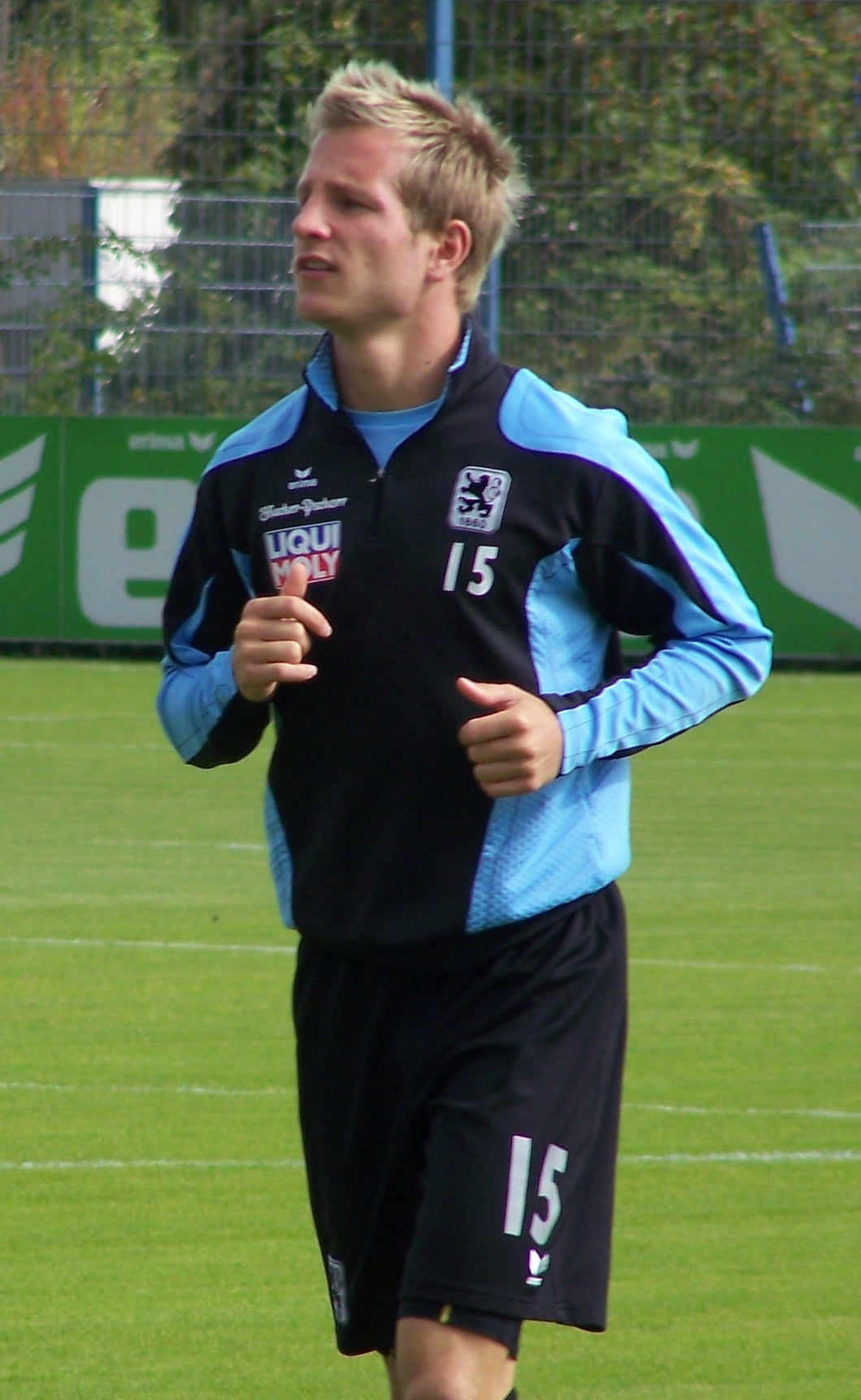
- Aigner with 1860 Munich

Personal information
- Date of birth: 20 August 1987 (age 39)
- Place of birth: Munich, West Germany
- Height: 1.85 m (6 ft 1 in)
- Position: Midfielder

Youth career
- 1992–2006: 1860 Munich

Senior career*
Years	Team	Apps	(Gls)
2006–2007	SV Wacker Burghausen	28	(5)
2007–2008	Arminia Bielefeld II	24	(2)
2008	Arminia Bielefeld	5	(0)
2009	1860 Munich II	2	(1)
2009–2012	1860 Munich	121	(25)
2012–2016	Eintracht Frankfurt	95	(22)
2016–2017	1860 Munich	24	(3)
2017–2018	Colorado Rapids	10	(2)
2018–2019	KFC Uerdingen 05	33	(6)
2019–2021	Wehen Wiesbaden	24	(5)
Total		366	(71)
- * Club domestic league appearances and goals

Stefan Aigner (born 20 August 1987) is a German former professional footballer who played as a midfielder.

Aigner spent most of his career in Germany, apart from a brief spell in USA with Colorado Rapids. He has played in 274 matches in Germany's top two divisions and has played in the Europa League.

== Career ==
In 2012, Aigner was announced at Eintracht Frankfurt on a three year contract. On 17 September 2014, he signed a four year contract extension until 30 June 2018.

In July 2016, Aigner was announced at 1860 Munich on a four year contract.

On 27 July 2017, Aigner was announced at Colorado Rapids on a three year contract. He won the 2017 September Player of the Month award for assisting Dominique Badji, and for scoring his first MLS goal against Montréal Impact on 30 September 2017. Aigner won the 2017 October Player of the Month award for scoring his second goal in MLS. On 4 January 2018, he began a two week training stint with Hoffenheim to gain fitness before Colorado's pre season. On 8 June 2018, Aigner mutually terminated his contract with Colorado Rapids.

In 2019, Aigner was announced at Wehen Wiesbaden on a one year contract. On 12 July 2020, he signed a new one year contract with the club.

In June 2021, Aigner announced his retirement from professional football.

== Coaching career ==
After his retirement, in October 2021, Aigner rejoined SVWW as a scout.

He worked as an intern with FC Augsberg, before being appointed as assistant coach of the U19 team in July 2023.

In July 2024, Aigner was announced as assistant coach of the FC Augsberg U23 team.
