= List of football clubs in Germany =

The following article lists various football clubs in Germany.

== List of clubs ==
Club	Division	League/ Level	City	State	German champion	Cup wins	Inter- national trophies
VfV 06 Hildesheim	Oberliga Niedersachsen	5	Hildesheim	Lower Saxony	0	0	0
VfL 07 Bremen	Bremen-Liga	6	Bremen	Bremen	0	0	0
FSV 08 Bissingen	Oberliga Baden-Württemberg	5	Bietigheim-Bissingen	Baden-Württemberg	0	0	0
TSV 1860 Munich	3. Liga	3	Munich	Bavaria	1	2	0
TSV 1860 Rosenheim	Regionalliga Bayern	4	Rosenheim	Bavaria	0	0	0
TSV 1865 Dachau	Bayernliga Süd	5	Dachau	Bavaria	0	0	0
Blau-Weiß 1890 Berlin	—	—	Berlin	Berlin	1	0	0
FSV 63 Luckenwalde	Oberliga Nordost-Süd	5	Luckenwalde	Brandenburg	0	0	0
VfR Aalen	Regionalliga Südwest	4	Aalen	Baden-Württemberg	0	0	0
Alemannia Aachen	Regionalliga West	4	Aachen	NRW	0	0	0
Alemannia Haibach	Landesliga Bayern-Nordwest	6	Haibach	Bavaria	0	0	0
BFC Alemannia 90 Wacker	Landesliga Berlin Staffel 2	7	Berlin	Berlin	0	0	0
TSV Altenholz	Landesliga Schleswig-Holstein	6	Altenholz	Schleswig-Holstein	0	0	0
VSG Altglienicke	Regionalliga Nordost	4	Berlin	Berlin	0	0	0
SV Altlüdersdorf	NOFV-Oberliga Nord	5	Gransee	Brandenburg	0	0	0
FC Altona 93	Regionalliga Nord	4	Hamburg	Hamburg	0	0	0
FC Amberg	Bezirksliga Oberpfalz Nord	7	Amberg	Bavaria	0	0	0
DJK Ammerthal	Bayernliga Nord	5	Ammerthal	Bavaria	0	0	0
FC Anker Wismar	Verbandsliga Mecklenburg-Vorp.	6	Wismar	Mecklenburg-Vorp.	0	0	0
SpVgg Ansbach	Bayernliga Nord	5	Ansbach	Bavaria	0	0	0
Arminia Bielefeld	3. Liga	3	Bielefeld	NRW	0	0	0
Arminia Hannover	Oberliga Niedersachsen	5	Hannover	Lower Saxony	0	0	0
Arminia Ludwigshafen	Verbandsliga Südwest	6	Ludwigshafen	Rhineland-Palat.	0	0	0
FC Astoria Walldorf	Regionalliga Südwest	4	Walldorf	Baden-Württemberg	0	0	0
TSV Aubstadt	Regionalliga Bayern	4	Aubstadt	Bavaria	0	0	0
VfB Auerbach	Regionalliga Nordost	4	Auerbach	Saxony	0	0	0
FC Augsburg	Bundesliga	1	Augsburg	Bavaria	0	0	0
SG Aumund-Vegesack	Bremen-Liga	5	Bremen	Bremen	0	0	0
SV Babelsberg 03	Regionalliga Nordost	4	Potsdam	Brandenburg	0	0	0
Bahlinger SC	Regionalliga Südwest	4	Bahlingen	Baden-Württemberg	0	0	0
TSG Balingen	Regionalliga Südwest	4	Bahlingen	Baden-Württemberg	0	0	0
FC Basara Mainz	Verbandsliga Südwest	6	Mainz	Rhineland-Palat.	0	0	0
KSV Baunatal	Hessenliga	5	Baunatal	Hesse	0	0	0
Bayer 04 Leverkusen	Bundesliga	1	Leverkusen	NRW	1	1	1
FC Bayern Alzenau	Regionalliga Südwest	4	Alzenau	Bavaria	0	0	0
SpVgg Bayern Hof	Bayernliga Nord	5	Hof	Bavaria	0	0	0
FC Bayern Munich	Bundesliga	1	Munich	Bavaria	33	20	14
SpVgg Bayreuth	Regionalliga Bayern	4	Bayreuth	Bavaria	0	0	0
SV Bergisch Gladbach 09	Regionalliga West	4	Bergisch Gladbach	NRW	0	0	0
Berliner AK 07	Regionalliga Nordost	4	Berlin	Berlin	0	0	0
Berliner SV	Bezirksliga Berlin	8	Berlin	Berlin	0	0	0
Bischofswerdaer FV 08	Regionalliga Nordost	4	Bischofswerda	Saxony	0	0	0
Blumenthaler SV	Bremen-Liga	5	Bremen	Bremen	0	0	0
1. FC Bocholt	Oberliga Niederrhein	5	Bocholt	NRW	0	0	0
VfL Bochum	Bundesliga	1	Bochum	NRW	0	0	0
TSV Bogen	Landesliga Bayern-Mitte	6	Bogen	Bavaria	0	0	0
Bonner SC	Regionalliga West	4	Bonn	NRW	0	0	0
Borussia Dortmund	Bundesliga	1	Dortmund	NRW	8	5	3
Borussia Fulda	Kreisliga A Fulda	9	Fulda	Hesse	0	0	0
Borussia Mönchengladbach	Bundesliga	1	Mönchengladbach	NRW	5	3	2
Borussia Neunkirchen	Saarlandliga	6	Neunkirchen	Saarland	0	0	0
Brandenburger SC Süd 05	NOFV-Oberliga Nord	5	Brandenburg	Brandenburg	0	0	0
FT Braunschweig	Oberliga Niedersachsen	5	Braunschweig	Lower Saxony	0	0	0
Bremer SV	Bremen-Liga	5	Bremen	Bremen	0	0	0
OSC Bremerhaven	Landesliga Bremen	6	Bremerhaven	Bremen	0	0	0
Brinkumer SV	Bremen-Liga	5	Stuhr	Lower Saxony	0	0	0
TSV Buchbach	Regionalliga Bayern	4	Buchbach	Bavaria	0	0	0
TSV Buchholz 08	Oberliga Hamburg	5	Buchholz	Lower Saxony	0	0	0
FSV Budissa Bautzen	Sachsenliga	6	Bautzen	Saxony	0	0	0
SpVgg Burgbrohl	Kreisliga B Mayen	9	Burgbrohl	Rhineland-Palat.	0	0	0
SV Wacker Burghausen	Regionalliga Bayern	4	Burghausen	Bavaria	0	0	0
VfR Bürstadt	Kreisoberliga Bergstraße	8	Bürstadt	Hesse	0	0	0
Buxtehuder SV	Landesliga Hamburg-Hansa	6	Buxtehude	Lower Saxony	0	0	0
Carl Zeiss Jena	Regionalliga Nordost	4	Jena	Thuringia	0	0	0
SCC Berlin	Landesliga Berlin	7	Berlin	Berlin	0	0	0
Chemie Böhlen	Bezirksklasse Leipzig	8	Böhlen	Saxony	0	0	0
Chemnitzer FC	Regionalliga Nordost	4	Chemnitz	Saxony	0	0	0
BV Cloppenburg	Niedersachsenliga	5	Cloppenburg	Lower Saxony	0	0	0
SC Condor Hamburg	Oberliga Hamburg	5	Hamburg	Hamburg	0	0	0
SV Darmstadt 98	Bundesliga	1	Darmstadt	Hesse	0	0	0
TuS Dassendorf	Oberliga Hamburg	5	Dassendorf	Schleswig-Holstein	0	0	0
SV Dessau 05	Verbandsliga Sachsen-Anhalt	6	Dessau	Saxony-Anhalt	0	0	0
FV Diefflen	Oberliga Rheinland-Pfalz/Saar	5	Dillingen	Saarland	0	0	0
DJK Don Bosco Bamberg	Bayernliga Nord	5	Bamberg	Bavaria	0	0	0
Dresdner SC	Landesklasse Ost	7	Dresden	Saxony	2	2	0
SV Drochtersen/Assel	Regionalliga Nord	4	Drochtersen	Lower Saxony	0	0	0
MSV Duisburg	3. Liga	3	Duisburg	NRW	0	0	0
TuRU Düsseldorf	Oberliga Niederrhein	5	Düsseldorf	NRW	0	0	0
Berliner FC Dynamo	Regionalliga Nordost	4	Berlin	Berlin	0	0	0
Dynamo Dresden	3. Liga	3	Dresden	Saxony	0	0	0
FC Ederbergland	Hessenliga	5	Battenberg (Eder)	Hesse	0	0	0
SV Eichede	Schleswig-Holstein-Liga	5	Steinburg	Schleswig-Holstein	0	0	0
VfB Eichstätt	Regionalliga Bayern	4	Eichstätt	Bavaria	0	0	0
FC Einheit Rudolstadt	NOFV-Oberliga Süd	5	Rudolstadt	Thuringia	0	0	0
VfB Einheit zu Pankow	Bezirksliga Berlin	8	Berlin	Berlin	0	0	0
Eintracht Bad Kreuznach	Verbandsliga Südwest	6	Bad Kreuznach	Rhineland-Palat.	0	0	0
FC Eintracht Bamberg	Landesliga Bayern-Nordwest	6	Bamberg	Bavaria	0	0	0
Eintracht Braunschweig	2. Bundesliga	2	Braunschweig	Lower Saxony	1	0	0
FC Eintracht Norderstedt 03	Regionalliga Nord	4	Norderstedt	Schleswig-Holstein	0	0	0
Eintracht Frankfurt	Bundesliga	1	Frankfurt	Hesse	1	5	3
FC Eintracht Rheine	Oberliga Westfalen	5	Rheine	NRW	0	0	0
TSV Eintracht Stadtallendorf	Regionalliga Südwest	4	Stadtallendorf	Hesse	0	0	0
FC Mecklenburg Schwerin	NOFV-Oberliga Nord	5	Schwerin	Mecklenburg-Vorp.	0	0	0
Eintracht Trier	Oberliga Rheinland-Pfalz/Saar	5	Trier	Rhineland-Palat.	0	0	0
SV Elversberg	Regionalliga Südwest	4	Spiesen-Elversberg	Saarland	0	0	0
SC Eltersdorf	Bayernliga Nord	5	Erlangen	Bavaria	0	0	0
Energie Cottbus	Regionalliga Nordost	4	Cottbus	Brandenburg	0	0	0
VfB Eppingen	Verbandsliga Baden	6	Eppingen	Baden-Württemberg	0	0	0
SpVgg Erkenschwick	Westfalenliga 2	6	Oer-Erkenschwick	NRW	0	0	0
SV Erlenbach	Bayernliga Nord	5	Erlenbach am Main	Bavaria	0	0	0
TuS Erndtebrück	Regionalliga West	4	Erndtebrück	NRW	0	0	0
Erzgebirge Aue	3. Liga	3	Aue	Saxony	0	0	0
1. SC Feucht	Landesliga Bayern-Nordost	6	Feucht	Bavaria	0	0	0
Fortuna Babelsberg	Landesliga Brandenburg/Nord	7	Potsdam	Brandenburg	0	0	0
Fortuna Köln	Regionalliga West	4	Cologne	NRW	0	0	0
Fortuna Düsseldorf	2. Bundesliga	2	Düsseldorf	NRW	1	2	0
FSV Frankfurt	Regionalliga Südwest	4	Frankfurt	Hesse	0	0	0
1. FC Frankfurt	Verbandsliga	6	Frankfurt (Oder)	Brandenburg	0	0	0
Freiburger FC	Verbandsliga Südbaden	6	Freiburg	Baden-Württemberg	1	0	0
SC Freiburg	Bundesliga	1	Freiburg	Baden-Württemberg	0	0	0
VfL Frohnlach	Landesliga Bayern-Nordost	6	Frohnlach	Bavaria	0	0	0
FSV Union Fürstenwalde	Regionalliga Nordost	4	Fürstenwalde	Brandenburg	0	0	0
VfR Garching	Regionalliga Bayern	4	Garching	Bavaria	0	0	0
BSG Wismut Gera	NOFV-Oberliga Süd	5	Gera	Thuringia	0	0	0
1. FC Germania Egestorf/Langreder	Regionalliga Nord	4	Barsinghausen	Lower Saxony	0	0	0
VfB Germania Halberstadt	Regionalliga Nordost	4	Halberstadt	Saxony-Anhalt	0	0	0
SV Germania Schöneiche	Landesliga	7	Schöneiche	Brandenburg	0	0	0
TSV Germania Windeck	Landesliga Mittelrhein Staffel 1	6	Windeck	NRW	0	0	0
FSV Glückauf Brieske-Senftenberg	Landesliga Brandenburg-Süd	7	Senftenberg	Brandenburg	0	0	0
SV Gonsenheim	Oberliga Rheinland-Pfalz/Saar	5	Gonsenheim	Rhineland-Palat.	0	0	0
SV Göppingen	Oberliga Baden-Württemberg	5	Göppingen	Baden-Württemberg	0	0	0
Goslarer SC 08	Landesliga Braunschweig	6	Goslar	Lower Saxony	0	0	0
Göttingen 05	Bezirksoberliga Braunschweig	7	Göttingen	Lower Saxony	0	0	0
SpVgg Greuther Fürth	2. Bundesliga	2	Fürth	Bavaria	3	0	0
SG Sonnenhof Großaspach	Oberliga Baden-Württemberg	5	Aspach	Baden-Württemberg	0	0	0
TSV Großbardorf	Bayernliga Nord	5	Großbardorf	Bavaria	0	0	0
FC Gundelfingen	Landesliga Bayern-Südwest	6	Gundelfingen	Bavaria	0	0	0
FC Gütersloh 2000	Oberliga Westfalen	5	Gütersloh	NRW	0	0	0
VfL Halle 1896	NOFV-Oberliga Süd	5	Halle	Saxony-Anhalt	0	0	0
Hallescher FC	3. Liga	3	Halle	Saxony-Anhalt	0	0	0
Hamburger SV	Bundesliga	1	Hamburg	Hamburg	6	3	2
Hammer SpVg	Oberliga Westfalen	5	Hamm	NRW	0	0	0
FC Hanau 93	Gruppenliga Frankfurt Ost	7	Hanau	Hesse	0	0	0
SpVgg Hankofen-Hailing	Bayernliga Süd	5	Leiblfing	Bavaria	0	0	0
Hannover 96	2. Bundesliga	2	Hannover	Lower Saxony	2	1	0
F.C. Hansa Rostock	2. Bundesliga	2	Rostock	Mecklenburg-Vorp.	0	0	0
SC Hauenstein	Verbandsliga Südwest	6	Hauenstein	Rhineland-Palat.	0	0	0
TSV Havelse	Regionalliga Nord	4	Garbsen	Lower Saxony	0	0	0
Heeslinger SC	Niedersachsenliga	5	Heeslingen	Lower Saxony	0	0	0
1. FC Heidenheim	2. Bundesliga	2	Heidenheim	Baden-Württemberg	0	0	0
Heider SV	Schleswig-Holstein-Liga	5	Heide	Schleswig-Holstein	0	0	0
FC Heilbronn	Landesliga Württemberg	7	Heilbronn	Baden-Württemberg	0	0	0
VfL Nagold	Landesliga Württemberg	7	Nagold	Baden-Württemberg	0	0	0
SV Heimstetten	Bayernliga Süd	5	Munich	Bavaria	0	0	0
FC Hennef 05	Mittelrheinliga	5	Hennef (Sieg)	NRW	0	0	0
SC Herford	Westfalenliga	6	Herford	NRW	0	0	0
CFC Hertha 06	NOFV-Oberliga Nord	5	Berlin	Berlin	0	0	0
Hertha Zehlendorf	NOFV-Oberliga Nord	5	Berlin	Berlin	0	0	0
SC Hessen Dreieich	Hessenliga	5	Dreieich	Hesse	0	0	0
KSV Hessen Kassel	Regionalliga Südwest	4	Kassel	Hesse	0	0	0
Hertha BSC	2. Bundesliga	2	Berlin	Berlin	2	0	0
FC Hertha Wiesbach	Oberliga Rheinland-Pfalz/Saar	5	Eppelborn	Saarland	0	0	0
TSG 1899 Hoffenheim	Bundesliga	1	Sinsheim	Baden-Württemberg	0	0	0
FSV Hollenbach	Verbandsliga Württemberg	6	Mulfingen	Baden-Württemberg	0	0	0
Holstein Kiel	2. Bundesliga	2	Kiel	Schleswig-Holstein	1	0	0
FC 08 Homburg	Oberliga Rheinland-Pfalz/Saar	5	Homburg	Saarland	0	0	0
VfB Homberg	Oberliga Niederrhein	5	Duisburg	NRW	0	0	0
HSV Barmbek-Uhlenhorst	Oberliga Hamburg	5	Hamburg	Hamburg	0	0	0
FV Illertissen	Regionalliga Bayern	4	Illertissen	Bavaria	0	0	0
FC Ingolstadt 04	3. Liga	3	Ingolstadt	Bavaria	0	0	0
Inter Leipzig	NOFV-Oberliga Süd	5	Leipzig	Saxony	0	0	0
FC Ismaning	Bayernliga Süd	5	Ismaning	Bavaria	0	0	0
FSV Jägersburg	Oberliga Rheinland-Pfalz/Saar	5	Homburg (Saar)	Saarland	0	0	0
TV Jahn Hiesfeld	Oberliga Niederrhein	5	Dinslaken	NRW	0	0	0
SSV Jahn Regensburg	3. Liga	3	Regensburg	Bavaria	0	0	0
1. FC Kaiserslautern	2. Bundesliga	2	Kaiserslautern	Rhineland-Palat.	4	2	0
FC Karbach	Oberliga Rheinland-Pfalz/Saar	5	Karbach	Rhineland-Palat.	0	0	0
Karlsruher FV	Kreisklasse Karlsruhe	9	Karlsruhe	Baden-Württemberg	1	0	0
Karlsruher SC	2. Bundesliga	2	Karlsruhe	Baden-Württemberg	1	2	0
Kickers Emden	Landesliga Weser-Ems	6	Emden	Lower Saxony	0	0	0
Kickers Offenbach	Regionalliga Südwest	4	Offenbach	Hesse	0	1	0
FC Kilia Kiel	Landesliga Schleswig-Holstein	6	Kiel	Schleswig-Holstein	0	0	0
SV Kirchanschöring	Bayernliga Süd	5	Kirchanschöring	Bavaria	0	0	0
KFC Uerdingen 05	Regionalliga West	4	Krefeld	NRW	0	1	0
1. FC Kleve	Landesliga Niederrhein	6	Kleve	NRW	0	0	0
TuS Koblenz	Regionalliga Südwest	4	Koblenz	Rhineland-Palat.	0	0	0
1. FC Köln	Bundesliga	1	Cologne	NRW	3	4	0
TSV Kottern	Bayernliga Süd	5	Kempten	Bavaria	0	0	0
FC Kray	Landesliga Niederrhein 2	6	Essen	NRW	0	0	0
FC Lampedusa			Hamburg	Hamburg	0	0	0
TSV Landsberg	Bayernliga Süd	5	Landsberg am Lech	Bavaria	0	0	0
TSV Lehnerz	Hessenliga	5	Fulda	Hesse	0	0	0
RB Leipzig	Bundesliga	1	Leipzig	Saxony	0	2	0
SV Lichtenberg 47	NOFV-Oberliga Nord	5	Berlin	Berlin	0	0	0
SV Lippstadt 08	Oberliga Westfalen	5	Lippstadt	NRW	0	0	0
FSC Lohfelden	Hessenliga	5	Lohfelden	Hesse	0	0	0
Sportfreunde Lotte	Oberliga Westfalen	5	Lotte	NRW	0	0	0
1. FC Lokomotive Leipzig	Regionalliga Nordost	4	Leipzig	Saxony	3	1	0
1. FC Lok Stendal	Verbandsliga Sachsen-Anhalt	6	Stendal	Saxony-Anhalt	0	0	0
VfB Lübeck	Regionalliga Nord	4	Lübeck	Schleswig-Holstein	0	0	0
Lüneburger SK Hansa	Regionalliga Nord	4	Lüneburg	Lower Saxony	0	0	0
Lupo Martini Wolfsburg	Oberliga Niedersachsen	5	Wolfsburg	Lower Saxony	0	0	0
1. FC Magdeburg	2. Bundesliga	2	Magdeburg	Saxony-Anhalt	0	0	1
Malchower SV	NOFV-Oberliga Nord	5	Malchow	Mecklenburg-Vorp.	0	0	0
VfR Mannheim	Verbandsliga Baden	6	Mannheim	Baden-Württemberg	1	0	0
FSV Mainz 05	Bundesliga	1	Mainz	Rhineland-Palat.	0	0	0
SSV Markranstädt	Sachsenliga	6	Markranstädt	Saxony	0	0	0
TSV Marl-Hüls	Oberliga Westfalen	5	Marl	NRW	0	0	0
TuS Mechtersheim	Oberliga Rheinland-Pfalz/Saar	5	Römerberg	Rhineland-Palat.	0	0	0
TSV Meerbusch	Landesliga Niederrhein 1	6	Meerbusch	NRW	0	0	0
FC Memmingen	Regionalliga Bayern	4	Memmingen	Bavaria	0	0	0
SV Meppen	Regionalliga Nord	4	Meppen	Lower Saxony	0	0	0
ZFC Meuselwitz	Regionalliga Nordost	4	Meuselwitz	Thuringia	0	0	0
SV Morlautern	Oberliga Rheinland-Pfalz/Saar	5	Kaiserslautern	Rhineland-Palat.	0	0	0
SV Motor Altenburg	Thüringenliga	6	Altenburg	Thuringia	0	0	0
1. FC Mülheim	Bezirksliga Niederrhein	8	Mülheim	NRW	0	0	0
SpVgg Neckarelz	Verbandsliga Baden	6	Neckarelz	Baden-Württemberg	0	0	0
Neckarsulmer SU	Oberliga Baden-Württemberg	5	Neckarsulm	Baden-Württemberg	0	0	0
1. FC Neubrandenburg 04	Verbandsliga Mecklenburg-Vorp.	6	Neubrandenburg	Mecklenburg-Vorp.	0	0	0
ASV Neumarkt	Bayernliga Nord	5	Neumarkt	Bavaria	0	0	0
VfR Neumünster	Schleswig-Holstein-Liga	5	Neumünster	Schleswig-Holstein	0	0	0
TSG Neustrelitz	Regionalliga Nordost	4	Neustrelitz	Mecklenburg-Vorp.	0	0	0
FC Nöttingen	Oberliga Baden-Württemberg	5	Remchingen	Baden-Württemberg	0	0	0
1. FC Nürnberg	2. Bundesliga	2	Nuremberg	Bavaria	9	4	0
SV Oberachern	Oberliga Baden-Württemberg	5	Achern	Baden-Württemberg	0	0	0
FC Oberlausitz Neugersdorf	Regionalliga Nordost	4	Neugersdorf	Saxony	0	0	0
FC Oberneuland	Bremen-Liga	5	Bremen	Bremen	0	0	0
Offenburger FV	Verbandsliga Südbaden	6	Offenburg	Baden-Württemberg	0	0	0
FSV Oggersheim	1. Kreisklasse Rheinpfalz Süd	11	Ludwigshafen	Rhineland-Palat.	0	0	0
VfB Oldenburg	Regionalliga Nord	4	Oldenburg	Lower Saxony	0	0	0
VfL Oldenburg	Niedersachsenliga	5	Oldenburg	Lower Saxony	0	0	0
FSV Optik Rathenow	NOFV-Oberliga Nord	5	Rathenow	Brandenburg	0	0	0
VfL Osnabrück	2. Bundesliga	2	Osnabrück	NRW	0	0	0
OSV Hannover	Landesliga Hannover	6	Hannover	Lower Saxony	0	0	0
SC Paderborn 07	Bundesliga	1	Paderborn	NRW	0	0	0
TSG Pfeddersheim	Oberliga Rheinland-Pfalz/Saar	5	Worms	Rhineland-Palat.	0	0	0
1. CfR Pforzheim	Oberliga Baden-Württemberg	5	Pforzheim	Baden-Württemberg	0	0	0
SC Pfullendorf	Verbandsliga Südbaden	6	Pfullendorf	Baden-Württemberg	0	0	0
VfL Pinneberg	Oberliga Hamburg	5	Pinneberg	Schleswig-Holstein	0	0	0
FC Pipinsried	Regionalliga Bayern	4	Altomünster	Bavaria	0	0	0
FK Pirmasens	Oberliga Rheinland-Pfalz/Saar	5	Pirmasens	Rhineland-Palat.	0	0	0
VFC Plauen	NOFV-Oberliga Süd	5	Plauen	Saxony	0	0	0
FC Pommern Stralsund	Verbandsliga Mecklenburg-Vorp.	6	Stralsund	Mecklenburg-Vorp.	0	0	0
Preußen Münster	3. Liga	3	Münster	NRW	0	0	0
SV Pullach	Bayernliga Süd	5	Pullach	Bavaria	0	0	0
FV Ravensburg	Oberliga Baden-Württemberg	5	Ravensburg	Baden-Württemberg	0	0	0
FC Remscheid	Landesliga Niederrhein	6	Remscheid	NRW	0	0	0
SSV Reutlingen	Oberliga Baden-Württemberg	5	Reutlingen	Baden-Württemberg	0	0	0
SV Röchling Völklingen	Regionalliga Südwest	4	Völklingen	Saarland	0	0	0
SV Rödinghausen	Regionalliga West	4	Rödinghausen	NRW	0	0	0
Rot-Weiss Ahlen	Oberliga Westfalen	5	Ahlen	NRW	0	0	0
Rot-Weiß Darmstadt	Verbandsliga Hessen-Süd	6	Darmstadt	Hesse	0	0	0
Rotenburger SV	Oberliga Niedersachsen	5	Rotenburg (Wümme)	Lower Saxony	0	0	0
Rot-Weiss Essen	3. Liga	3	Essen	NRW	1	1	0
FC Rot-Weiß Erfurt	Regionalliga Nordost	4	Erfurt	Thuringia	0	0	0
Rot-Weiss Frankfurt	Hessenliga	5	Frankfurt	Hesse	0	0	0
SV Rot-Weiß Hadamar	Hessenliga	5	Hadamar	Hesse	0	0	0
TuS Rot-Weiss Koblenz	Oberliga Rheinland-Pfalz/Saar	5	Koblenz	Rhineland-Palat.	0	0	0
Rot-Weiß Oberhausen	Regionalliga West	4	Oberhausen	NRW	0	0	0
SV Saar 05 Saarbrücken	Oberliga Rheinland-Pfalz/Saar	5	Saarbrücken	Saarland	0	0	0
1. FC Saarbrücken	Regionalliga Südwest	4	Saarbrücken	Saarland	0	0	0
BSG Chemie Leipzig	Regionalliga Nordost	4	Leipzig	Saxony	0	0	0
FSV Salmrohr	Oberliga Rheinland-Pfalz/Saar	5	Salmrohr	Rhineland-Palat.	0	0	0
1. FC Sand	Bayernliga Nord	5	Sand am Main	Bavaria	0	0	0
SV Sandhausen	3. Liga	3	Sandhausen	Baden-Württemberg	0	0	0
SV Schalding-Heining	Regionalliga Bayern	4	Passau	Bavaria	0	0	0
FC Schalke 04	2. Bundesliga	2	Gelsenkirchen	NRW	7	5	1
TSV Schilksee	Schleswig-Holstein-Liga	5	Kiel	Schleswig-Holstein	0	0	0
Schwarz-Weiß Essen	Oberliga Niederrhein	5	Essen	NRW	0	1	0
SV Schott Jena	NOFV-Oberliga Süd	5	Jena	Thuringia	0	0	0
TSV Schwabmünchen	Bayernliga Süd	5	Schwabmünchen	Bavaria	0	0	0
BSV Schwarz-Weiß Rehden	Regionalliga Nord	4	Rehden	Lower Saxony	0	0	0
FC Schweinfurt 05	Regionalliga Bayern	4	Schweinfurt	Bavaria	0	0	0
BSV 07 Schwenningen	Bezirksliga Schwarzwald	8	Schwenningen	Baden-Württemberg	0	0	0
FC Schönberg 95	Verbandsliga or Landesliga	6	Schönberg	Mecklenburg-Vorp.	0	0	0
TSV Schott Mainz	Regionalliga Südwest	4	Mainz	Rhineland-Palat.	0	0	0
SV Seligenporten	Regionalliga Bayern	4	Pyrbaum	Bavaria	0	0	0
1. FC Sonthofen	Bayernliga Süd	5	Sonthofen	Bavaria	0	0	0
Sportfreunde Baumberg	Oberliga Niederrhein	5	Baumberg	NRW	0	0	0
Sportfreunde Seligenstadt	Gruppenliga Ost	7	Seligenstadt	Hesse	0	0	0
Sportfreunde Siegen	Oberliga Westfalen	5	Siegen	NRW	0	0	0
SV Spielberg	Oberliga Baden-Württemberg	5	Karlsbad (Baden)	Baden-Württemberg	0	0	0
TSG Sprockhövel	TSG Sprockhövel	5	Sprockhövel	NRW	0	0	0
FC St. Pauli	2. Bundesliga	2	Hamburg	Hamburg	0	0	0
SuS Stadtlohn	Westfalenliga 1	6	Stadtlohn	NRW	0	0	0
FC Stahl Brandenburg	Brandenburg-Liga	6	Brandenburg	Brandenburg	0	0	0
TSV Stahl Riesa	Sachsenliga	6	Riesa	Saxony	0	0	0
TSV Steinbach	Regionalliga Südwest	4	Steinbach	Hesse	0	0	0
FC Strausberg	NOFV-Oberliga Nord	5	Strausberg	Brandenburg	0	0	0
Stuttgarter Kickers	Regionalliga Südwest	4	Stuttgart	Baden-Württemberg	0	0	0
VfB Stuttgart	Bundesliga	1	Stuttgart	Baden-Württemberg	5	3	0
Tennis Borussia Berlin	NOFV-Oberliga Nord	5	Berlin	Berlin	0	0	0
Teutonia Watzenborn-Steinberg	Hessenliga	5	Pohlheim	Hesse	0	0	0
Türkiyemspor Berlin	Landesliga Berlin Staffel 2	7	Berlin	Berlin	0	0	0
SSV Ulm 1846	Regionalliga Südwest	4	Ulm	Baden-Württemberg	0	0	0
1. FC Union Berlin	Bundesliga	1	Berlin	Berlin	0	0	0
FC Unterföhring	Regionalliga Bayern	4	Unterföhring	Bavaria	0	0	0
SpVgg Unterhaching	Regionalliga Bayern	4	Munich	Bavaria	0	0	0
SSVg Velbert	Oberliga Niederrhein	5	Velbert	NRW	0	0	0
OSC Vellmar	Hessenliga	5	Vellmar	Hesse	0	0	0
SC Verl	Regionalliga West	4	Verl	NRW	0	0	0
SC Victoria Hamburg	Oberliga Hamburg	5	Hamburg	Hamburg	0	0	0
SC Viktoria 06 Griesheim	Hessenliga	5	Griesheim	Hesse	0	0	0
1. FC Viktoria 07 Kelsterbach	Verbandsliga Hessen-Mitte	6	Kelsterbach	Hesse	0	0	0
FC Viktoria 09 Urberach	Verbandsliga Hessen-Süd	6	Rödermark	Hesse	0	0	0
Viktoria Aschaffenburg	Bayernliga Nord	5	Aschaffenburg	Bavaria	0	0	0
BFC Viktoria 1889	—	—	Berlin	Berlin	2	0	0
FC Viktoria 1889 Berlin	Regionalliga Nordost	4	Berlin	Berlin	0	0	0
FC Viktoria Köln 1904	Regionalliga West	4	Cologne	NRW	0	0	0
DJK Vilzing	Bayernliga Süd	5	Vilzing	Bavaria	0	0	0
FSV Wacker 90 Nordhausen	Regionalliga Nordost	4	Nordhausen	Thuringia	0	0	0
SG Wattenscheid 09	Regionalliga West	4	Bochum	NRW	0	0	0
SV Waldhof Mannheim	Regionalliga Südwest	4	Mannheim	Baden-Württemberg	0	0	0
Wandsbeker TSV Concordia	Oberliga Hamburg	5	Hamburg	Hamburg	0	0	0
DSC Wanne-Eickel	Westfalenliga	6	Wanne-Eickel	NRW	0	0	0
FC Wegberg-Beeck	Regionalliga West	4	Wegberg	NRW	0	0	0
SV Wehen Wiesbaden	2. Bundesliga	2	Taunusstein (Wiesbaden)	Hesse	0	0	0
ETSV Weiche	Regionalliga Nord	4	Flensburg	Schleswig-Holstein	0	0	0
SpVgg Weiden	Bayernliga Nord	5	Weiden	Bavaria	0	0	0
SV Werder Bremen	Bundesliga	1	Bremen	Bremen	4	6	1
SC Westfalia Herne	Westfalenliga	6	Herne	NRW	0	0	0
Westfalia Rhynern	Regionalliga West	4	Rhynern	NRW	0	0	0
SC Wiedenbrück 2000	Regionalliga West	4	Rheda-Wiedenbrück	NRW	0	0	0
SV Wilhelmshaven	Bremen Bezirksliga	7	Wilhelmshaven	Lower Saxony	0	0	0
VfL Wolfsburg	2. Bundesliga	2	Wolfsburg	Lower Saxony	1	1	0
BCF Wolfratshausen	Bayernliga Süd	5	Wolfratshausen	Bavaria	0	0	0
Wormatia Worms	Regionalliga Südwest	4	Worms	Rhineland-Palat.	0	0	0
Wuppertaler SV	Regionalliga West	4	Wuppertal	NRW	0	0	0
Würzburger FV	Bayernliga Nord	5	Würzburg	Bavaria	0	0	0
Würzburger Kickers	3. Liga	3	Würzburg	Bavaria	0	0	0
FSV Zwickau	Regionalliga Nordost	4	Zwickau	Saxony	0	0	0

== See also ==
- List of football clubs in Germany by major honours won
- Founding Clubs of the DFB
- German football champions
- List of football clubs in East Germany
