= Michael Thurk =

German footballer

Personal information
- Date of birth: 28 May 1976 (age 50)
- Place of birth: Frankfurt, West Germany
- Height: 1.77 m (5 ft 10 in)
- Position: Forward

Youth career
- –1995: Sportfreunde Frankfurt

Senior career*
Years	Team	Apps	(Gls)
1995–1997	SpVgg Oberrad		
1997–1999	TGM SV Jügesheim		
1999–2004	Mainz 05	139	(42)
2004	Energie Cottbus	8	(3)
2005–2006	Mainz 05	45	(18)
2006–2007	Eintracht Frankfurt	36	(4)
2008–2011	FC Augsburg	104	(51)
2012–2014	1. FC Heidenheim	68	(13)
2018	FC Stätzling	3	(1)

Managerial career
- 2018–2019: FC Stätzling
- 2019: Mainz 05 (assistant)
- 2020–: Mainz 05 (supervisor)
- * Club domestic league appearances and goals

Michael Thurk (born 28 May 1976) is a German former professional footballer who played as a forward.

== Career ==
Born in Frankfurt, Thurk joined 1. FSV Mainz 05 from Hessian Oberliga club SV Jügesheim in 1999 on advice of Django Mann who already connected a transfer of Abderrahim Ouakili.

In 2005–06, Thurk marked 12 goals, being the third best player who would be eligible to play for Germany. Before the 2006–07 season, he moved to Eintracht Frankfurt, a transfer that is much disputed among Eintracht supporters because Thurk was a long term player for local rivals Mainz and a cult figure at the 05ers. In January 2008, he moved to FC Augsburg. In the 2009–10 season, Augsburg finished just short of promotion to the Bundesliga with Thurk being the league's top goalscorer. The following season Augsburg won promotion, with Thurk being suspended from the club shortly before the beginning of the 2011–12 season. He signed for 1. FC Heidenheim in January 2012. He left Heidenheim at the end of the 2013–14 season as his contract was not renewed.

After departing Heidenheim, Thurk was close to agreeing moves to India and the United States, namely Columbus Crew, but no transfer went through due to his injury problems. A move to Gibraltarian club Europa also fell through in early 2015.
