= Youssef Mokhtari =

Moroccan footballer

Personal information
- Date of birth: 5 March 1979 (age 47)
- Place of birth: Beni Sidel, Morocco
- Height: 1.85 m (6 ft 1 in)
- Position: Midfielder

Youth career
- 1996–2000: SV Raunheim

Senior career*
Years	Team	Apps	(Gls)
2000–2001	FSV Frankfurt	64	(11)
2001–2002	Jahn Regensburg	46	(10)
2002–2004	Wacker Burghausen	58	(10)
2004–2005	Energie Cottbus	27	(8)
2005–2006	1. FC Köln	13	(0)
2006–2007	MSV Duisburg	39	(13)
2007–2008	Al-Rayyan	11	(4)
2008–2009	FSV Frankfurt	23	(3)
2009–2010	Greuther Fürth	11	(2)
2010–2011	Metz	12	(1)
2011–2014	Wacker Burghausen	64	(14)
2014–2015	Dudelange	3	(0)
2015–2016	Viktoria Aschaffenburg	5	(1)
2016–2017	Hessen Dreieich	34	(8)
2017-2018	FC Viktoria 09 Urberach	8	(1)
2018–2019	SV 07 Raunheim		
Total		418	(86)

International career
2003–2008	Morocco	23	(7)

Managerial career
- 2016–2017: Hessen Dreieich (youth)
- 2017–2019: FC Viktoria 09 Urberach (youth)
Medal record
Men's football
Representing Morocco
Africa Cup of Nations
Runner-up	2004 Tunisia
- * Club domestic league appearances and goals

Youssef Mokhtari (Arabic: يوسف المختاري; born 5 March 1979) is a Moroccan former professional footballer who played as a midfielder.

== Career ==
Mokhtari had previous spells at Jahn Regensburg, Wacker Burghausen, Energie Cottbus, 1. FC Köln, MSV Duisburg, Al-Rayyan and Metz. On 14 October 2008, he moved to 2. Bundesliga team FSV Frankfurt and left after just one year later to sign with Greuther Fürth. On 27 January 2010, Mokhtari left Fürth, dissolving his contract by mutual consent. After being released by Greuther Fürth, Mokhtari signed later on the same day a contract running half a year with Metz. On 20 June 2014, he agreed to a two-year deal with Luxembourg champion F91 Dudelange after spending three years playing for 3. Liga side Wacker Burghausen.

== International career ==
Mokhtari played for Morocco internationally.

Mokhtari played a crucial role in Morocco's 2004 African Cup of Nations campaign, becoming the tournament's top scorer and helping Morocco reach the final for the second time in their history, after a 28-year absence. In that tournament, Mokhtari became the first Moroccan to score four goals in a single Africa Cup of Nations edition a record later matched by Brahim Díaz at the 2025 tournament hosted in Morocco.

== Personal life ==
Mokhtari is of Moroccan-Riffian origin and holds both Moroccan and German nationality. He is the older brother of Oualid Mokhtari who played for FSV Frankfurt among other clubs. On 6 October 2024, Mokhtari announced in an interview with the Moroccan sports outlet Hesport that he had obtained the CAF A Licence and was pursuing a career as a football manager, aiming to lead a professional team in the near future.

== Career statistics ==
=== International ===
Scores and results list Morocco's goal tally first, score column indicates score after each Mokhtari goal.

List of international goals scored by Youssef Mokhtari
No.	Date	Venue	Opponent	Score	Result	Competition
1	31 January 2004	Stade Taïeb El Mhiri, Sfax, Tunisia	Benin	2–0	4–0	2004 African Cup of Nations
2	11 February 2004	Stade Olympique de Sousse, Sousse, Tunisia	Mali	1–0	4–0	2004 African Cup of Nations
3	11 February 2004	Stade Olympique de Sousse, Sousse, Tunisia	Mali	2–0	4–0	2004 African Cup of Nations
4	14 February 2004	National Stadium of Rades, Tunis, Tunisia	Tunisia	1–1	2–1	2004 African Cup of Nations
5	3 July 2004	Botswana National Stadium, Gaborone, Botswana	Botswana	1–0	1–0	2006 FIFA World Cup qualification
6	16 November 2007	Stade de France, Paris, France	France	2–2	2–2	Friendly
7	21 November 2007	Stade Dominique Duvauchelle, Créteil, France	Senegal	2–0	3–0	Friendly

== Honours ==
Jahn Regensburg

- Bavarian Cup: 2001

Hessen Dreieich

- Hessenliga: 2016–17

Morocco

- Africa Cup of Nations runner-up: 2004

Individual

- Africa Cup of Nations Top scorer: 2004 (joint)

Orders

- Officer of the Order of National Merit (Morocco): 2004
