= Lothar Buchmann =

German football player and coach (1936–2023)

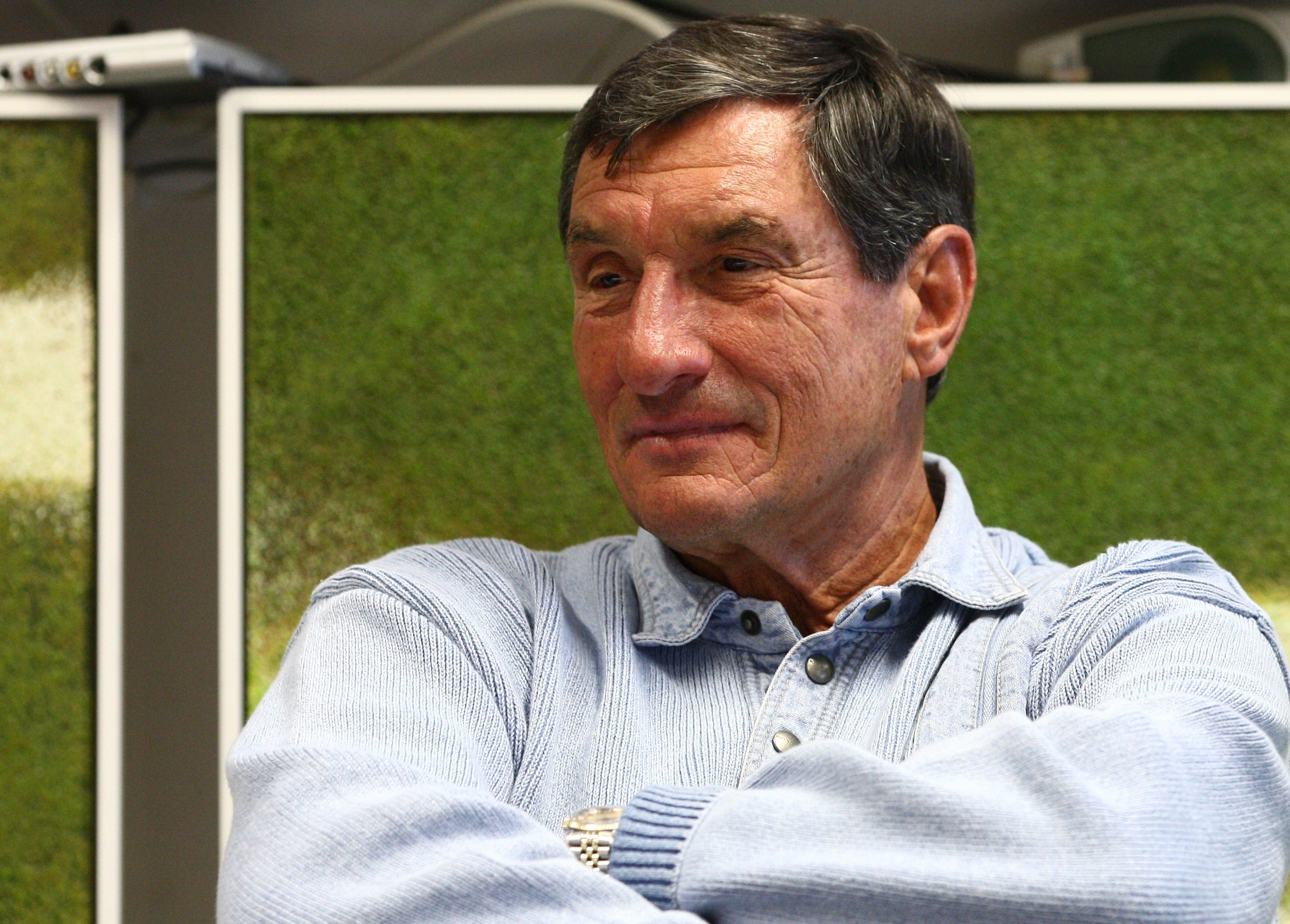
- Buchmann in 2011

Personal information
- Date of birth: 15 August 1936
- Place of birth: Breslau, Germany
- Date of death: 21 November 2023 (aged 87)
- Place of death: Reichelsheim, Hesse, Germany
- Position: Forward

Senior career*
Years	Team	Apps	(Gls)
1955–1960	Mainz 05		
1960–1963	Eintracht Bad Kreuznach		
1963–1966	Wormatia Worms		
1966–1974	VfR Bürstadt		

Managerial career
- 1974–1976: VfR Bürstadt
- 1976–1979: Darmstadt 98
- 1979–1980: VfB Stuttgart
- 1980–1982: Eintracht Frankfurt
- 1982–1984: Kickers Offenbach
- 1984–1985: VfR Bürstadt
- 1985–1986: Karlsruher SC
- 1986–1987: Viktoria Aschaffenburg
- 1988: Rot-Weiss Essen
- 1989: LASK
- 1989–1992: SG Egelsbach
- 1992–1994: Kickers Offenbach
- 1994–1995: Eintracht Bad Kreuznach
- 1996–1998: Darmstadt 98
- 1999: DJK Waldberg
- 2001–2005: FC Ober-Ramstadt
- 2005–2006: Germania Ober-Roden
- 2006–2008: SV 1910 Weiterstadt
- 2009–2010: SV Winterkasten
- 2010: FC Bursa Darmstadt
- 2011–2012: FC 07 Bensheim
- 2012: TSV Nieder-Ramstadt
- 2012–2013: SKG Ober-Beerbach
- 2013: FSV Schneppenhausen
- 2013–2014: FC 07 Bensheim
- * Club domestic league appearances and goals

Lothar Buchmann (15 August 1936 – 21 November 2023) was a German football player and coach.

== Career ==
As a player, he played for Mainz 05 and Eintracht Bad Kreuznach in the first-tiered Oberliga Südwest, where he appeared in 191 matches, scoring 49 goals between 1955 and 1963. After the introduction of the Bundesliga in the 1963–64 season, he joined the second division Regionalliga Südwest and Süd clubs Wormatia Worms and VfR Bürstadt. In 131 league matches he marked 26 goals.

In the Bundesliga, he managed Darmstadt 98, VfB Stuttgart, Eintracht Frankfurt, Kickers Offenbach, and Karlsruher SC between 1978 and 1985. At the helm of Eintracht Frankfurt, Buchmann won the DFB-Pokal in 1981.

== Death ==
Buchmann died on 21 November 2023, at the age of 87.

== Honours ==
=== Manager ===
==== VfR Bürstadt ====
- Hessian Cup: 1974-75

==== SV Darmstadt 98 ====
- 2. Bundesliga Süd: 1977-78

==== Eintracht Frankfurt ====
- DFB-Pokal: 1980-81

==== Kickers Offenbach ====
- Hessian Cup: 1992-93

Awards and achievements
Preceded by Otto Rehhagel	DFB-Pokal Winning Coach; 1980–81	Succeeded by Pál Csernai
