= Dirk Vollmar =

German footballer and manager

Personal information
- Date of birth: 4 April 1972 (age 54)
- Place of birth: East Germany
- Height: 1.74 m (5 ft 9 in)
- Position: Forward

Youth career
- Stahl Lugau
- Wismut Aue

Senior career*
Years	Team	Apps	(Gls)
1991–1993	Chemnitzer FC	24	(2)
1993–1996	TuS Paderborn-Neuhaus	86	(74)
1996–1997	Juve Stabia	11	(0)
1997–2000	Kickers Offenbach	47	(12)
2000	SV Wehen	9	(4)
2000–2005	BFC Dynamo		
2005	SV Bernbach		
2005–2008	TGM SV Jügesheim		

Managerial career
- 2002–2003: Berliner FC Dynamo
- 2008–2009: TGM SV Jügesheim
- * Club domestic league appearances and goals

Dirk Vollmar (born 4 April 1972) is a German former footballer who played as a forward.
