= FV Bad Vilbel =

German football club

- Full name: Fußball-Verein Bad Vilbel 1919 e.V.
- Nickname: The FV
- Founded: 30 March 1919; 106 years ago
- Ground: Nidda-Sportfeld
- Capacity: 6,000
- Chairman: Willi Eckhardt
- Manager: Amir Mustafic
- League: Hessenliga (V)
- 2018–19: 10th
- Website: http://www.fv-bad-vilbel.de/index.php
Home colours	Away colours

FV Bad Vilbel is a German football club from Bad Vilbel, near Frankfurt, Hesse. Founded on 30 March 1919 as SV 1919 Bad Vilbel, they merged with FG Phönix Bad Vilbel in 1933 to become FC Phönix Bad Vilbel and were re-established under their current name after World War II. The club today has a membership of about 450 and was playing in the Oberliga Hessen (IV) as a mid-table side from 1992 to 2007. Bad Vilbel's best result there was a third-place finish in 2000. In 2007, the club was relegated to the Verbandsliga Hessen-Süd. They currently play in the fifth-tier of German football, the Hessenliga.

The team plays its home matches in the Nidda-Sportfeld which has a capacity of 6,000.

== Honours ==
The club's honours:

League

- Verbandsliga Hessen-Süd
  - Champions: 2017–18
- Landesliga Hessen-Süd
  - Champions: 1991–92
  - Runners-up: 1987–88, 1988–89
- Bezirksklasse
  - Champions: 1929, 1938–39, 1986–87
- A-Klasse
  - Champions: 1973–74
- B-Klasse Frankfurt/Ost
  - Champions: 1970–71
- B-Klasse Obertaunus/Usingen
  - Champions: 1966–67

Cup

- Hesse Cup
  - Runners-up: 1994–95

== Recent seasons ==
The recent season-by-season performance of the club:

Season	Division	Tier	Position
1986–87	Bezirksklasse	VI	1st ↑
1987–88	Landesliga Hessen-Süd	V	2nd
1988–89	Landesliga Hessen-Süd	V	2nd
1989–90	Landesliga Hessen-Süd	V	10th
1990–91	Landesliga Hessen-Süd	V	3rd
1991–92	Landesliga Hessen-Süd	V	1st ↑
1992–93	Oberliga Hessen	IV	13th
1993–94	Oberliga Hessen	IV	7th
1994–95	Oberliga Hessen	IV	6th
1995–96	Oberliga Hessen	IV	6th
1996–97	Oberliga Hessen	IV	9th
1997–98	Oberliga Hessen	IV	4th
1998–99	Oberliga Hessen	IV	10th
1999–2000	Oberliga Hessen	IV	3rd
2000–01	Oberliga Hessen	IV	7th
2001–02	Oberliga Hessen	IV	4th
2002–03	Oberliga Hessen	IV	12th
2003–04	Oberliga Hessen	IV	10th
2004–05	Oberliga Hessen	IV	5th
2005–06	Oberliga Hessen	IV	6th
2006–07	Oberliga Hessen	IV	15th ↓
2007–08	Landesliga Hessen-Süd	V	4th
2008–09	Verbandsliga Hessen-Süd	VI	16th
2009–10	Verbandsliga Hessen-Süd	VI	7th
2010–11	Verbandsliga Hessen-Süd	VI	15th
2011–12	Verbandsliga Hessen-Süd	VI	9th
2012–13	Verbandsliga Hessen-Süd	VI	7th
2013–14	Verbandsliga Hessen-Süd	VI	5th
2014–15	Verbandsliga Hessen-Süd	VI	12th
2015–16	Verbandsliga Hessen-Süd	VI	3rd
2016–17	Verbandsliga Hessen-Süd	VI	3rd
2017–18	Verbandsliga Hessen-Süd	VI	1st ↑
2018–19	Hessenliga	V	10th
2019–20	Hessenliga	V	

- With the introduction of the Regionalliga's in 1994 and the 3. Liga in 2008 as the new third tier, below the 2. Bundesliga, all leagues below dropped one tier. Also in 2008, a large number of football leagues in Hesse were renamed, with the Oberliga Hessen becoming the Hessenliga, the Landesliga becoming the Verbandsliga, the Bezirksoberliga becoming the Gruppenliga and the Bezirksliga becoming the Kreisoberliga.

↑ Promoted	↓ Relegated
