= Lothar Kleim =

German footballer

Personal information
- Date of birth: 27 October 1936 (age 90)
- Position: Midfielder

Senior career*
Years	Team	Apps	(Gls)
1957–1969	Schalke 04		
1959–1963	Hessen Kassel		
1963–1966	Eintracht Trier		
1970–1973	Union Luxembourg		

Managerial career
- 1978–1979: Eintracht Trier
- 1980–1981: VfR Bürstadt
- 1981–1982: SpVgg Fürth
- 1982–1983: SG Union Solingen
- 1984: Darmstadt 98
- 1986–1987: SpVgg Fürth
- * Club domestic league appearances and goals

Lothar Kleim (born 27 October 1936) is a German former football player and manager who played as a midfielder.
