= Fabian Bäcker =

German footballer

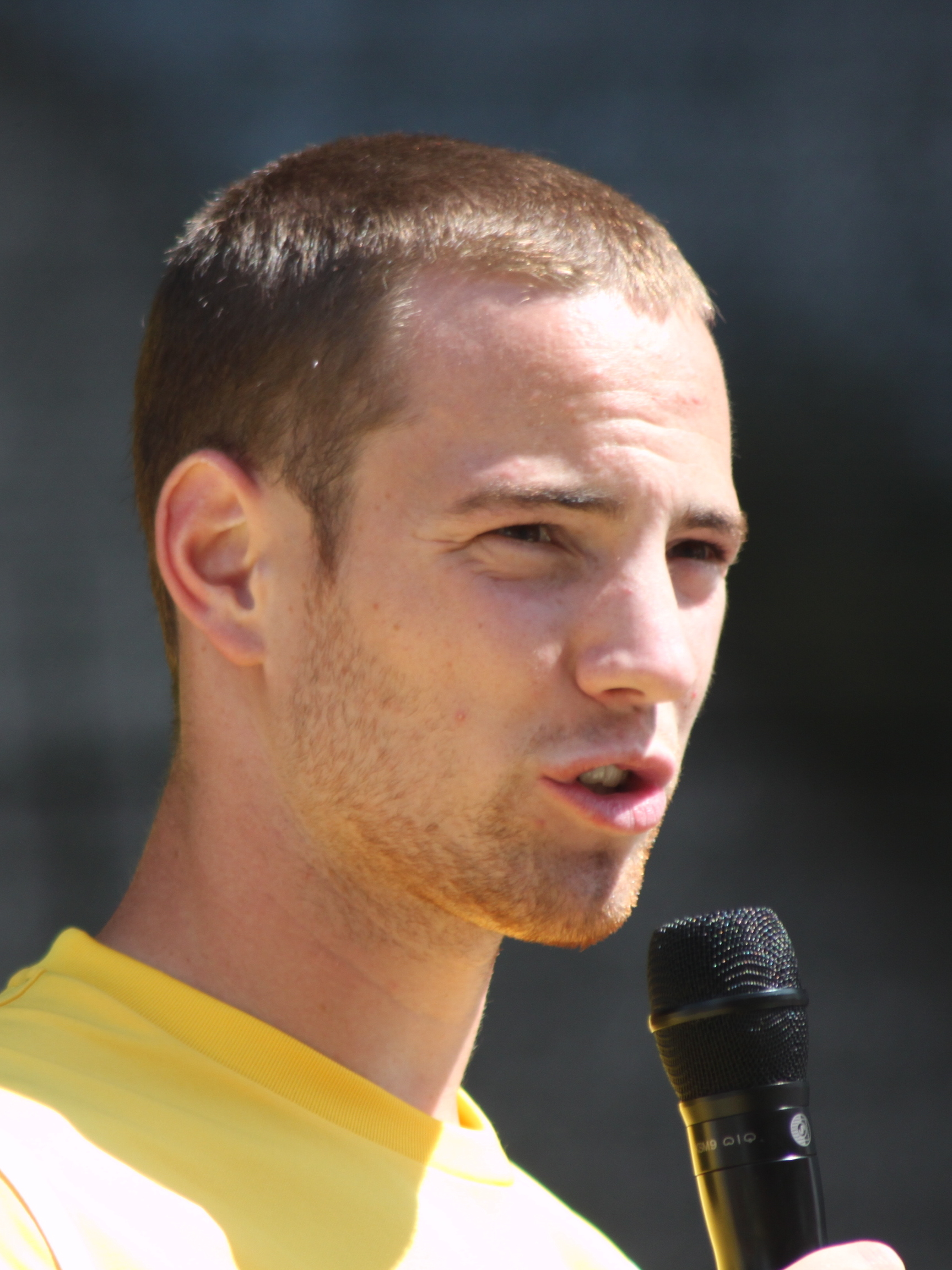
- Bäcker in 2011

Personal information
- Full name: Fabian Bäcker
- Date of birth: 28 May 1990 (age 36)
- Place of birth: Rotenburg an der Fulda, West Germany
- Height: 1.82 m (6 ft 0 in)
- Position: Forward

Team information
- Current team: Germania Ober-Roden II
- Number: 19

Youth career
- 1994–1999: VfB Heringen
- 1999–2003: SV Eimelrod
- 2003–2004: TSV Rattlar
- 2004–2008: Borussia Mönchengladbach

Senior career*
Years	Team	Apps	(Gls)
2008–2011	Borussia M'gladbach II	60	(18)
2009–2011	Borussia Mönchengladbach	2	(1)
2011–2012	Alemannia Aachen	1	(0)
2012	→ Borussia M'gladbach II (loan)	14	(7)
2012–2016	Kickers Offenbach	93	(17)
2016–2017	FC Bayern Alzenau	13	(6)
2017–2020	Germania Ober-Roden	51	(20)
2020–	Germania Ober-Roden II	3	(2)

International career
	Germany U18	6	(0)
	Germany U20	5	(2)

Managerial career
- 2019–: Germania Ober-Roden
- * Club domestic league appearances and goals as of 19 January 2021

Fabian Bäcker (born 28 May 1990) is a German professional footballer who plays as a forward for Germania Ober-Roden II. He is also a football coach of Germania Ober-Roden

== Career ==
=== Club ===
Bäcker was born in Rotenburg an der Fulda, Hesse. He passed through numerous youth teams in Borussia Mönchengladbach and brought himself to notice when he scored 42 goals in 48 games in the Under-19-Bundesliga. In parallel, he played in Borussia's under-23 team in the Regionalliga, where he achieved two goals in 13 games. In the 2009–10 season, he signed a professional contract with Borussia Mönchengladbach.

Already in his second friendly game against SV Wacker Gotha, he succeeded in scoring a hat-trick only eight minutes into the game. On 16 January 2010, Bäcker scored his first Bundesliga goal against VfL Bochum. In April 2011, Bäcker signed a two-year contract with Alemannia Aachen.

=== National team ===
Bäcker played for various German youth teams
