= Norbert Wagner (football manager) =

German football manager

Personal information
- Date of birth: 15 January 1939 (age 87)

Managerial career
- Years: Team
- 1976: SG Union Solingen
- 1978–1979: Freiburger FC
- 1979: KSV Baunatal
- 1980–1981: SC Freiburg
- 1981: SpVgg Bayreuth
- 1983: TuS Schloß Neuhaus
- 1985: VfR Bürstadt
- 1990–1991: Alemannia Aachen

Norbert Wagner (born 15 January 1939) is a retired German football manager.
