= SV Buchonia Flieden =

German football club

- Full name: Sportverein Buchonia Flieden 1912 e.V.
- Founded: 1912
- Ground: Stadion am Weiher
- Capacity: 2,000
- Chairman: Winfried Happ
- Manager: Martin Hohmann
- League: Hessenliga (V)
- 2021–22: Hessenliga (V), 8th
Home colours	Away colours

SV Buchonia Flieden is a German association football club in Flieden, Hesse.

== History ==
The association was created in January 1912 in the hotel "Zum Hasenfuß". From its founding until the end of the 1970s the club played as a lower division side with its first notable success coming in 1978 with the team's promotion to the Landesliga Hessen-Nord (V) and their advance to the final of the Hessenpokal in 1980. Despite a 0–2 loss there to RSV Würges the club was entitled to participation in its first DFB-Pokal tournament. Flieden was knocked out in the opening round by 2. Bundesliga side FC Ingolstadt 04 by a score of 1–4 with a crowd of 2,000.

The capture of a Landesliga title in 1996 led to their first-time ascent to the Oberliga Hessen (IV) where they played a single season. Flieden have established themselves as regulars in Hesse's highest amateur league since their return to the Oberliga in 2001, briefly dropping down to the Verbandsliga in 2009–10 before making an immediate return. Finishing last in the league in 2015–16 Buchonia Flieden was relegated from the Hessenliga once more.

== Honours ==
The club's honours:

- Landesliga Hessen-Nord
  - Champions: 1996, 2001
- Hessenpokal
  - Runners-up: 1980

== Recent managers ==
Recent managers of the club:

Manager	Start	Finish
Martin Hohmann	?	present

== Recent seasons ==
The recent season-by-season performance of the club:

Season	Division	Tier	Position
1999–2000	Landesliga Hessen-Nord	V	2nd
2000–01	Landesliga Hessen-Nord	V	1st ↑
2001–02	Oberliga Hessen	IV	15th
2002–03	Oberliga Hessen	IV	13th
2003–04	Oberliga Hessen	IV	7th
2004–05	Oberliga Hessen	IV	9th
2005–06	Oberliga Hessen	IV	4th
2006–07	Oberliga Hessen	IV	9th
2007–08	Oberliga Hessen	IV	16th
2008–09	Hessenliga	V	16th ↓
2009–10	Verbandsliga Hessen-Nord	VI	2nd ↑
2010–11	Hessenliga	V	13th
2011–12	Hessenliga	V	11th
2012–13	Hessenliga	V	3rd
2013–14	Hessenliga	V	15th
2014–15	Hessenliga	V	8th
2015–16	Hessenliga	V	17th ↓
2016–17	Verbandsliga Hessen-Nord	VI	

- With the introduction of the Regionalligas in 1994 and the 3. Liga in 2008 as the new third tier, below the 2. Bundesliga, all leagues below dropped one tier. Also in 2008, a large number of football leagues in Hesse were renamed, with the Oberliga Hessen becoming the Hessenliga, the Landesliga becoming the Verbandsliga, the Bezirksoberliga becoming the Gruppenliga and the Bezirksliga becoming the Kreisoberliga.

↑ Promoted	↓ Relegated
