= Barış Odabaş =

German-Turkish footballer

Personal information
- Date of birth: 21 February 1991 (age 35)
- Place of birth: Frankfurt, Germany
- Height: 1.75 m (5 ft 9 in)
- Position: Midfielder

Youth career
- Viktoria Preußen
- Eintracht Frankfurt
- Darmstadt 98
- –2010: Kickers Offenbach

Senior career*
Years	Team	Apps	(Gls)
2009–2012	Kickers Offenbach II	52	(9)
2010–2012	Kickers Offenbach	2	(0)
2012–2013	Bayern Alzenau	15	(0)
2013–2014	FSV Fernwald	20	(1)
2014–2015	Boluspor	1	(0)
2015–2016	Spvgg 05 Oberrad	8	(3)
2016	Optik Rathenow	12	(0)
- * Club domestic league appearances and goals

Barış Odabaş (born 21 February 1991) is a German-Turkish footballer who plays as a midfielder.
