= Eintracht Wetzlar =

German football club

- Full name: Eintracht Wetzlar 1905 e.V.
- Founded: 30 July 1905
- Ground: Stadion Wetzlar
- Capacity: 8,000
- Chairman: Hans-Jürgen Irmer
- Manager: Oliver Dönges
- League: Gruppenliga Gießen/Marburg (VII)
- 2015–16: 11th
Home colours

Eintracht Wetzlar is a German association football club based in Wetzlar, Hesse.

== History ==
Formed on 30 July 1905 as Wetzlarer Fußball Club, they merged with Wetzlarer Ballspielclub 1910 in 1927 to become Sportverein Wetzlar 05. From the early 30s until the early 40s, the team played second division football until a title win advanced them to the Gauliga Hessen-Nassau (I) for a single season.

Following World War II a number of local sides including SV were combined to create Sportgemeinde Eintracht Wetzlar which, for all but five seasons, played third division football as a lower table side until the formation of the Bundesliga – Germany's first top-flight professional league – in 1963. SG carried on as a third-tier club in the Oberliga Hessen until an 18th-place result in 1971 saw the side relegated. After thirty-six years in lower-tier competition, Eintracht returned to the Oberliga Hessen (IV) in 2007 after capturing the second place in the Landesliga Hessen-Mitte (V), but this lasted only for one season, the club being relegated again.

The club made another return to the Hessenliga in 2010 but lasted for only two seasons before suffering another relegation.

== Honours ==
The club's honours:

=== League ===
- Verbandsliga Hessen-Mitte
  - Champions: 2010
  - Runners-up: 2003, 2007

=== Cup ===
- Hesse Cup
  - Winners: 1947, 1957

== Recent managers ==
Recent managers of the club:

Manager	Start	Finish
Fabio Eidelwein	1 July 2011	

== Recent seasons ==
The recent season-by-season performance of the club:

Season	Division	Tier	Position
2000–01	Landesliga Hessen-Mitte	V	11th
2001–02	Landesliga Hessen-Mitte	V	6th
2002–03	Landesliga Hessen-Mitte	V	2nd
2003–04	Landesliga Hessen-Mitte	V	11th
2004–05	Landesliga Hessen-Mitte	V	5th
2005–06	Landesliga Hessen-Mitte	V	4th
2006–07	Landesliga Hessen-Mitte	V	2nd ↑
2007–08	Oberliga Hessen	IV	17th ↓
2008–09	Verbandsliga Hessen-Mitte	VI	3rd
2009–10	Verbandsliga Hessen-Mitte	VI	1st ↑
2010–11	Hessenliga	V	10th
2011–12	Hessenliga	V	18th ↓
2012–13	Verbandsliga Hessen-Mitte	VI	11th
2013–14	Verbandsliga Hessen-Mitte	VI	12th
2014–15	Verbandsliga Hessen-Mitte	VI	14th ↓
2015–16	Gruppenliga Gießen/Marburg	VII	11th
2016–17	Gruppenliga Gießen/Marburg	VII	

- With the introduction of the Regionalligas in 1994 and the 3. Liga in 2008 as the new third tier, below the 2. Bundesliga, all leagues below dropped one tier. Also in 2008, a large number of football leagues in Hesse were renamed, with the Oberliga Hessen becoming the Hessenliga, the Landesliga becoming the Verbandsliga, the Bezirksoberliga becoming the Gruppenliga and the Bezirksliga becoming the Kreisoberliga.

↑ Promoted	↓ Relegated
