= SVA Bad Hersfeld =

German football club

- Full name: Spielverein Asbach-Bad Hersfeld 1928 e.V.
- Founded: 5 August 1928; 96 years ago
- Ground: Vereinsgelände Asbach
- Capacity: 4,000
- Chairman: Frank Ullrich
- Trainer: Marco Hilpert
- League: Gruppenliga (VII)
- 2015–16: Verbandsliga Hessen-Nord (VI), 14th (relegated)
Home colours

Spielverein Asbach-Bad Hersfeld is a German association football club based in Asbach, formerly a separate village, but now part of the town of Bad Hersfeld, Hesse.

== History ==
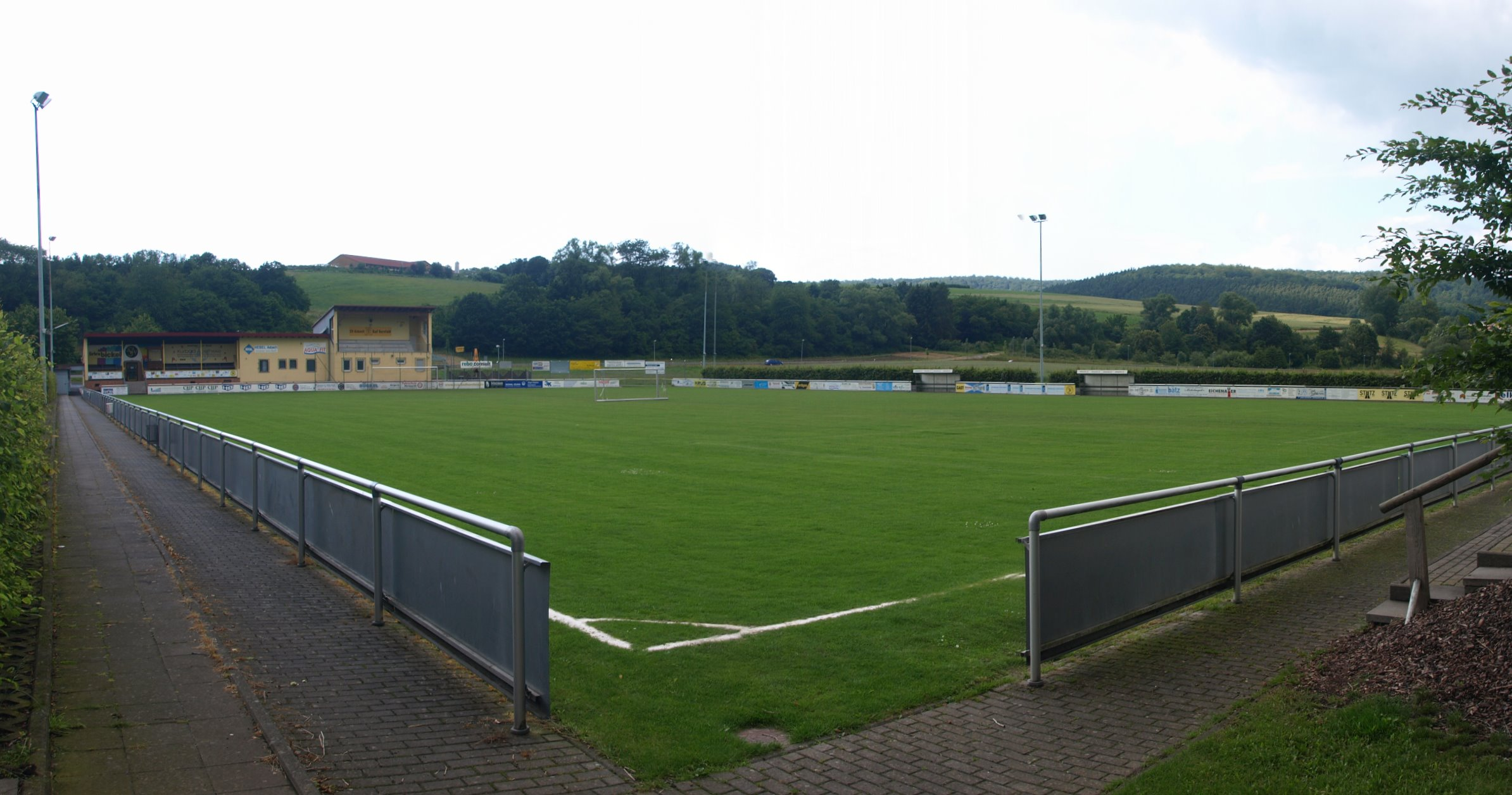
SVA Bad Hersfeld's home ground

The earliest football played in Asbach was in 1911 and prior to World War I two clubs emerged. Spielvereinigung Asbach and Sportverein Germania Asbach were youth clubs that disappeared as a consequence of the war. A number of short-lived sports and gymnastics clubs came and went between 1922 and the formation on 5 August 1928 of Sportverein Asbach. This club also struggled early on, but managed to persevere. By 1936 SV had a number of local honours to its credit and was finally able to establish its own ground.

SVA long played in the shadow of Hessen Hersfeld, but after a 1993 title in the Bezirksoberliga Fulda (V) has become a fixture in the Landesliga Hesse-Nord (V). Following a second-place finish in the Verbandsliga Hessen-Nord (VI) in 2008–09, SVA was promoted to the Hessenliga but lasted for only one season before going down again. Another relegation followed in 2015–16, now to the Gruppenliga.

== Honours ==
The club's honours:

- Verbandsliga Hessen-Nord
  - Champions: 1998
  - Runners-up: 2001, 2003, 2009

== Recent seasons ==
- 1990–91 Bezirksoberliga Fulda (V) 6th
- 1991–92 Bezirksoberliga Fulda (V) 6th
- 1992–93 Bezirksoberliga Fulda (V) 1st ↑
- 1993–94 Landesliga Hesse-Nord (V) 3rd
- 1994–95 Landesliga Hesse-Nord (V) 7rd
- 1995–96 Landesliga Hesse-Nord (V) 6th
- 1996–97 Landesliga Hesse-Nord (V) 3rd
- 1997–98 Landesliga Hesse-Nord (V) 1st ↑
- 1998–99 Oberliga Hesse (IV) 11th
- 1999–00 Oberliga Hesse (IV) 16th ↓
- 2000–01 Landesliga Hesse-Nord (V) 2nd
- 2001–02 Landesliga Hesse-Nord (V) 6nd
- 2002–03 Landesliga Hesse-Nord (V) 2nd
- 2003–04 Landesliga Hesse-Nord (V) 5th
- 2004–05 Landesliga Hesse-Nord (V) 5th
- 2005–06 Landesliga Hesse-Nord (V) 7th
- 2006–07 Landesliga Hesse-Nord (V) 5th
- 2007–08 Landesliga Hesse-Nord (V) 4th
- 2008–09 Landesliga Hesse-Nord (V) 2nd ↑
- 2009–10 Oberliga Hesse (V) 19th ↓
- 2010–11 Verbandsliga Hessen-Nord (VI) 7th
- 2011–12 Verbandsliga Hessen-Nord (VI) 5th
