= 1. FC Viktoria 07 Kelsterbach =

German football club

- Full name: 1. FC Viktoria 07 Kelsterbach e.V.
- Founded: 1907
- Ground: Sportpark Kelsterbach
- Chairman: Udo Würz
- League: Hessenliga (V)
- 2015–16: Verbandsliga Hessen-Mitte (VI), 1st (promoted)
Home colours	Away colours

1. FC Viktoria 07 Kelsterbach is a German association football club based in Kelsterbach, Hesse.

== History ==
The club was founded 1907, and after briefly suspending play during World War I, re-established itself in 1918. The club played as an amateur local side during the inter-war period. After World War II Viktoria merged with TSG Kelsterbach to become KSG Kelsterbach and in May 1947 again took on the name 1. FC Viktoria.

The club was able to advance as high as the fourth division in the Landesliga Hessen-Süd from 1968 to 1974, with a single season spent in the Landesliga Hessen-Mitte (IV) in 1971–72, but were relegated the following season.

Viktoria has enjoyed some success in the local amateur ranks capturing sixth and seventh division titles in 1993, 1995, and 2004. A vice-championship in the Bezirksoberliga Wiesbaden (VI) in 2006 led to promotion to the Landesliga Hessen-Mitte (V), now the Verbandsliga (VI). Kelsterbach finished runners-up in the league in 2014–15, thereby qualifying for the promotion round to the Hessenliga were the club was however unsuccessful. In the following season Kelsterbach won the league and was promoted to the Hessenliga.

== Honours ==
The club's honours:

- Verbandsliga Hessen-Mitte
  - Champions: 2016
  - Runners-up: 2015
- Bezirksoberliga Wiesbaden (VI)
  - Champions: 1995, 2004
- Bezirksliga Wiesbaden (VII)
  - Champions: 1967, 1993
