= SC Neukirchen =

German football club

- Full name: Sportclub Neukirchen 1899 e. V.
- Founded: 1899
- Ground: Steinwaldstadion
- Capacity: 4,000
- Chairman: Bernd Knauff
- Manager: Ingo Mangold
- League: Kreisoberliga Schwalm-Eder (VIII)
- 2015–16: 2nd
Home colours	Away colours

The SC Neukirchen is a German association football club from the city of Neukirchen, Hesse.

== History ==
The actual foundation date of the club is shrouded in mystery but the club decided in 1945 that 1899 seemed the most likely year. The local gymnastics club, a predecessor of the SCN dates back to 1864 but the current club does not claim this as its foundation year.

The club did not rise above local amateur level until 1984, when it won promotion to the Landesliga Hessen-Nord, one of the three fourth-tier leagues in Hesse at the time. The SCN became an instant success in this league, finishing in the top-five for the next five seasons. In the 1989–90 seasons, it had to struggle, finishing only 12th but still well clear of the relegation places. After this laps, it returned to its old ways in 1990–91, coming third and won its league the season after.

Promoted to the Oberliga Hessen for the first time in 1992, it had two seasons in mid-table before winning the championship in Hesse's highest amateur league. Promotion to the Regionalliga Süd (III) was the reward for this.

The club held out for four seasons in the third division, earning a ninth-place finish in 1996–97 as its best result. After this, it declined and, coming last in 1999, was relegated back down again.

A second place in its first year back in the Oberliga was followed by a gradual decline. After the 2002–03 season, where an eleventh place would have meant survival, the club was forced to withdraw from the league for financial reasons. The SCN stepped down from tier-four straight to tier seven, entering the Bezirksliga Kassel for the 2003–04 seasons.

It struggled to find its footing in lower amateur football, suffering another relegation but soon recovered to climb the ranks again. In 2007, it won promotion to the tier six Bezirksoberliga, which became the Gruppenliga the following year. SCN lasted for four seasons at this level before suffering relegation in 2011.

== Honours ==
The club's honours:

=== League ===
- Oberliga Hessen (IV)
  - Champions: 1995
  - Runners-up: 2000
- Landesliga Hessen-Nord (IV)
  - Champions: 1992

=== Cup ===
- Hesse Cup
  - Winners: 1985, 1995, 1997
  - Runners-up: 1991, 1996, 1998, 2002

== Recent seasons ==
The recent season-by-season performance of the club:

Season	Division	Tier	Position
1999–2000	Oberliga Hessen	IV	2nd
2000–01	Oberliga Hessen	IV	3rd
2001–02	Oberliga Hessen	IV	8th
2002–03	Oberliga Hessen	IV	11th ↓
2003–04	Bezirksliga Kassel 3	VII	14th ↓
2004–05	Kreisliga A Schwalm-Eder 2	VIII	1st ↑
2005–06	Bezirksliga Kassel 3	VII	10th
2006–07	Bezirksliga Kassel 3	VII	2nd ↑
2007–08	Bezirksoberliga Kassel 1	VI	6th
2008–09	Gruppenliga Kassel 1	VII	6th
2009–10	Gruppenliga Kassel 1	VII	13th
2010–11	Gruppenliga Kassel 1	VII	15th ↓
2011–12	Kreisoberliga Schwalm-Eder	VIII	10th
2012–13	Kreisoberliga Schwalm-Eder	VIII	9th
2013–14	Kreisoberliga Schwalm-Eder	VIII	3rd
2014–15	Kreisoberliga Schwalm-Eder	VIII	2nd
2015–16	Kreisoberliga Schwalm-Eder	VIII	2nd
2016–17	Kreisoberliga Schwalm-Eder	VIII	

- With the introduction of the Regionalligas in 1994 and the 3. Liga in 2008 as the new third tier, below the 2. Bundesliga, all leagues below dropped one tier. Also in 2008, a large number of football leagues in Hesse were renamed, with the Oberliga Hessen becoming the Hessenliga, the Landesliga becoming the Verbandsliga, the Bezirksoberliga becoming the Gruppenliga and the Bezirksliga becoming the Kreisoberliga.

↑ Promoted	↓ Relegated

== Cup success ==
The club has taken out the Hesse Cup three times in its history, qualifying thereby for the German Cup, where it never went past the first round yet despite having home games each time:

- DFB Cup 1985–86: lost to Borussia Dortmund 2–9
- DFB Cup 1991–92: lost to Hallescher FC 0–3
- DFB Cup 1995–96: lost to 1. FSV Mainz 05 2–2 / 5–6 after penalties
- DFB Cup 1997–98: lost to KFC Uerdingen 05 0–2
