= KSV Klein-Karben =

German football club

- Full name: Kultur- und Sportverein Klein-Karben von 1890 e.V.
- Founded: 1890
- Ground: Günter-Reutzel-Stadion
- Capacity: 3,000
- Chairman: Jörg K. Wulf
- Manager: Thomas Biehrer
- League: Inactive
- Website: https://www.ksv-jugend.de
Home colours	Away colours

KSV Klein-Karben is a German association football club from Karben, Hesse, and is part of a larger sports club founded in 1890. The association also has departments for dance, gymnastics, model airplanes, skat, tennis, table tennis, volleyball, and youth.

== History ==
Not an outstanding side, the club achieved promotion to the tier-four Landesliga Hessen-Süd in 1981 but lasted for only one season before going down again. It made a return to their level in 1984 and, this time, would play for 13 consecutive seasons there. For the most part, the side finished in the upper half of the table and, in 1997, a league championship earned its promotion to the Oberliga Hessen.

KSV played in the Oberliga for the next 13 seasons, until 2010. In this era, a league championship in 2000 came as an absolute highlight, but the side was not promoted to the Regionalliga Süd. For the most part, the club remained a solid performer in the league until 2010, when a 16th-place finish meant relegation to the Verbandsliga Hessen-Süd (VI), where it played until 2014. A last place in the league in 2014 meant another relegation for the club, now to the Gruppenliga. Following another relegation in 2014–15 the club did not field a senior team in the 2015–16 season.

The club plays its home matches in the Günter-Reutzel-Stadion (capacity 3,000, ~120 seats).

== Honours ==
The club's honours:

=== League ===
- Oberliga Hessen (IV)
  - Champions: 2000
- Landesliga Hessen-Süd (V)
  - Champions: 1997
  - Runners-up: 1992, 1995, 1996

=== Cup ===
- Hesse Cup
  - Runners-up: 2007

== Recent managers ==
Recent managers of the club:

Manager	Start	Finish
Thomas Biehrer	1 July 2010	present

== Recent seasons ==
The recent season-by-season performance of the club:

Season	Division	Tier	Position
1999–2000	Oberliga Hessen	IV	1st
2000–01	Oberliga Hessen	IV	8th
2001–02	Oberliga Hessen	IV	5th
2002–03	Oberliga Hessen	IV	10th
2003–04	Oberliga Hessen	IV	12th
2004–05	Oberliga Hessen	IV	6th
2005–06	Oberliga Hessen	IV	9th
2006–07	Oberliga Hessen	IV	4th
2007–08	Oberliga Hessen	IV	12th
2008–09	Hessenliga	V	7th
2009–10	Hessenliga	V	16th ↓
2010–11	Verbandsliga Hessen-Süd	VI	9th
2011–12	Verbandsliga Hessen-Süd	VI	3rd
2012–13	Verbandsliga Hessen-Süd	VI	11th
2013–14	Verbandsliga Hessen-Süd	VI	18th ↓
2014–15	Gruppenliga Frankfurt-West	VII	15th ↓
2015–present	Inactive		

- With the introduction of the Regionalligas in 1994 and the 3. Liga in 2008 as the new third tier, below the 2. Bundesliga, all leagues below dropped one tier. Also in 2008, a large number of football leagues in Hesse were renamed, with the Oberliga Hessen becoming the Hessenliga, the Landesliga becoming the Verbandsliga, the Bezirksoberliga becoming the Gruppenliga and the Bezirksliga becoming the Kreisoberliga.

↑ Promoted	↓ Relegated
