= SV 1919 Bernbach =

German football club

- Full name: Sportverein 1919 Bernbach e.V.
- Founded: 1 September 1919
- Ground: Stadion an der Birkenhainer Straße
- Chairman: Thomas Börner, Jörg Franz, Freddy Giera, Hans Schilling
- Manager: Marco Roth
- League: Kreisoberliga Gelnhausen (VIII)
- 2015–16: 8th
Home colours	Away colours

SV 1919 Bernbach is a German association football club in Bernbach, a village in Freigericht, Hesse.

== History ==
The club was founded in the autumn of 1919 as Fußballclub Germania Bernbach. The club suspended its activities with the onset of World War II, and after the conflict, it was re-established as Sportgemeinde Bernbach, from which the current name, Sportverein 1919 Bernbach, emerged in 1954.

After many years in lower-tier football, the team first ascended to the Landesliga Hessen-Süd (V) in 1990 on the strength of a Bezirksliga Frankfurt/Ost championship. They finished in second place in their debut Landesliga season, and the capture of a division title in 1995 advanced the club to the Oberliga Hessen (IV). Bernbach earned a vice-championship there in 1998 and took part in a promotion playoff for the Regionalliga Süd (III), but missed advancing when they finished second to SC Pfullendorf.

The club soon ran into financial difficulty and by 2001 was facing bankruptcy. They were initially refused a license for Oberliga play and faced relegation, but after long negotiations and the adoption of a tight budget, they were able to stay in the league. Bernbach was eventually relegated after a poor result in 2005 and has since become an elevator club, moving frequently between fourth and fifth-tier competition. After reclaiming a place in the Oberliga in 2006–07, SV finished in 14th place and were again relegated to play in the Landesliga Hessen (V). In the following years, the club suffered a decline, which led to its relegation to the Kreisoberliga (VIII) for 2011–12.

SV Bernbach is notable as having been one of the ten smallest clubs in the country, playing at the Oberliga level.

== Honours ==
The club's honours:

=== League ===
- Landesliga Hessen-Süd
  - Champions: 1995, 2006
  - Runners-up: 1991
- Bezirksoberliga Frankfurt/Ost
  - Champions: 1990

=== Cup ===
- Hesse Cup
  - Runners-up: 2004

== Recent seasons ==
The recent season-by-season performance of the club:

Season	Division	Tier	Position
1999–2000	Oberliga Hessen	IV	8th
2000–01	Oberliga Hessen	IV	15th
2001–02	Oberliga Hessen	IV	11th
2002–03	Oberliga Hessen	IV	8th
2003–04	Oberliga Hessen	IV	14th
2004–05	Oberliga Hessen	IV	16th ↓
2005–06	Landesliga Hessen-Süd	V	1st ↑
2006–07	Oberliga Hessen	IV	14th ↓
2007–08	Landesliga Hessen-Süd	V	17th ↓
2008–09	Gruppenliga Frankfurt-Ost	VII	10th
2009–10	Gruppenliga Frankfurt-Ost	VII	10th
2010–11	Gruppenliga Frankfurt-Ost	VII	15th ↓
2011–12	Kreisoberliga Gelnhausen	VIII	7th
2012–13	Kreisoberliga Gelnhausen	VIII	6th
2013–14	Kreisoberliga Gelnhausen	VIII	2nd
2014–15	Kreisoberliga Gelnhausen	VIII	3rd
2015–16	Kreisoberliga Gelnhausen	VIII	8th
2016–17	Kreisoberliga Gelnhausen	VIII	

- With the introduction of the Regionalligas in 1994 and the 3. Liga in 2008 as the new third tier, below the 2. Bundesliga, all leagues below dropped one tier. Also in 2008, a large number of football leagues in Hesse were renamed, with the Oberliga Hessen becoming the Hessenliga, the Landesliga becoming the Verbandsliga, the Bezirksoberliga becoming the Gruppenliga and the Bezirksliga becoming the Kreisoberliga.

↑ Promoted	↓ Relegated
