= FC Lampedusa =

Part of FC St. Pauli, Hamburg

Fußballclub Lampedusa Hamburg is a football club based in Hamburg, Germany.

== History ==
FC Lampedusa was founded in 2014, and was originally formed for refugees who had come to Hamburg via the Italian island of Lampedusa. As of March 2015, it was open to any migrant or refugee 16 years of age and older, regardless of where they come from or whether they have legal documentation. Beginning in 2016, it became part of the FC St. Pauli and is coached on a volunteer basis by five women from the women and girls' division of the club.
