= RSV Würges =

German football club

- Full name: Rasensportverein Würges 1920 e.V.
- Founded: 1920
- Ground: RSV-Stadion Goldener Grund
- Capacity: 2,500
- Chairman: Karl Bermbach
- Manager: Thorsten Wörsdörfer
- League: Kreisoberliga Limburg-Weilburg (VIII)
- 2015–16: 5th
Home colours	Away colours

RSV Würges is a German football club from the district of Würges in Bad Camberg, Hesse.

== History ==
The club was founded on 1 August 1920 as Fußball Verein Teutonia Würges. By 1922 the club was known as FV Borussia Würges and in 1924 adopted its current name. The team made its first showing in the Amateur Oberliga Hessen (III) in 1983–84 and was sent down the following season after losing a relegation playoff to Tuspo Ziegenhain (0–1). They returned to third-tier football for a single season in 1991.

A second-place finish in the Landesliga Hessen-Mitte (V) and victory in the subsequent promotion playoff elevated the side to the Oberliga Hessen (IV) in 1996 for a two season long turn. After a decade in the Landesliga, RSV Würges returned to the Oberliga on the strength of a 2006 title win. The club also has two Hessenpokal wins to its credit that led to DFB-Pokal appearances in 1981 and 1988. They advanced to the third round in their first appearance before being put out by 2. Bundesliga side VfL Osnabrück (0–1). In 2012 the club decided to withdraw from the tier six Verbandsliga, despite finishing sixth, to the Kreisoberliga.

RSV Würges plays its home matches in the RSV-Stadion Goldener Grund which has a capacity of 2,500 (250 seats).

== Honours ==
The club's honours:

=== League ===
- Landesliga Hessen-Mitte
  - Champions: 1983, 1991, 2006
  - Runners-up: 1996, 2005

=== Cup ===
- Hesse Cup
  - Winners: 1980, 1987
