= SC Viktoria 06 Griesheim =

German football club

SC Viktoria Griesheim
- Full name: Sportclub Viktoria 06 Griesheim
- Founded: 1906; 120 years ago
- Ground: Stadion am Hegelsberg
- Capacity: 5,000
- Chairman: Karl-Heinz Schecker
- Manager: Holger Kurth
- League: Hessenliga (V)
- 2015–16: 8th
- Website: https://www.scv-griesheim.de/
Home colours	Away colours

SC Viktoria 06 Griesheim is a German football club based in Griesheim, Hesse.

== History ==
Founded in 1906 the club enjoyed some of its best seasons through the 70s and 80s. In 1973 they advanced to the Landesliga Hessen-Süd (IV) and in their fourth season of play there emerged as champions to earn promotion to the Oberliga Hessen (III). Three seasons later in 1980–81, Viktoria Griesheim claimed the championship in that division, in a year when no promotion places were available to the Oberliga champions. That was the pinnacle as the club's achievement as they began a slide that led to an 18th-place finish and relegation in 1988. Griesheim returned to the Oberliga for a single season appearances in 1991 and 2004, but both campaigns also ended in a last place finish and relegation.

The clubplayed in the Verbandsliga Hessen-Süd (VI) as an upper table side until 2012 when a league title meant another promotion.

== Honours ==
The club's honours:

- Oberliga Hessen
  - Champions: 1981
- Landesliga Hessen-Süd
  - Champions: 1977, 1990, 2003
- Verbandsliga Hessen-Süd
  - Champions: 2012

== Recent seasons ==
The recent season-by-season performance of the club:

Season	Division	Tier	Position
2000–01	Bezirksoberliga Darmstadt	VI	↑
2001–02	Landesliga Hessen-Süd	V	3rd
2002–03	Landesliga Hessen-Süd	V	1st ↑
2003–04	Oberliga Hessen	IV	18th ↓
2004–05	Landesliga Hessen-Süd	V	4th
2005–06	Landesliga Hessen-Süd	V	5th
2006–07	Landesliga Hessen-Süd	V	10th
2007–08	Landesliga Hessen-Süd	V	7th
2008–09	Verbandsliga Hessen-Süd	VI	13th
2009–10	Verbandsliga Hessen-Süd	VI	4th
2010–11	Verbandsliga Hessen-Süd	VI	7th
2011–12	Verbandsliga Hessen-Süd	VI	1st ↑
2012–13	Hessenliga	V	10th
2013–14	Hessenliga	V	16th
2014–15	Hessenliga	V	14th
2015–16	Hessenliga	V	8th
2016–17	Hessenliga	V	

- With the introduction of the Regionalligas in 1994 and the 3. Liga in 2008 as the new third tier, below the 2. Bundesliga, all leagues below dropped one tier. Also in 2008, a large number of football leagues in Hesse were renamed, with the Oberliga Hessen becoming the Hessenliga, the Landesliga becoming the Verbandsliga, the Bezirksoberliga becoming the Gruppenliga and the Bezirksliga becoming the Kreisoberliga.

↑ Promoted	↓ Relegated
