= Hessian Cup =

Hesse Cup
- Founded: 1945
- Region: Hesse, Germany
- Qualifier for: DFB-Pokal
- Current champions: Wehen Wiesbaden (2025–26)
- Most championships: Kickers Offenbach (13 titles)

The Hesse Cup (German: Hessenpokal) is one of the 21 regional cup competitions of German football. The winner of the competition gains entry to the first round of the German Cup.

== History ==
The Cup was established in 1945, after the end of the Second World War, in the state of Hessen, which then was part of the US occupation zone in Germany.

The Hessen Cup is played annually.

From 1974 onwards, the winner of the Hessen Cup qualified for the first round of the German Cup.

== Modus ==
Professional clubs are not permitted to enter the competition, meaning, no teams from the Bundesliga and the 2. Bundesliga can compete.

In 2008–09, the best 15 teams of the regional cups in Hesse qualified for the first round of the Hesse Cup. All clubs from Hesse playing in the Regionalliga and below take part in these competitions. Additionally, Kickers Offenbach and SV Wehen Wiesbaden are the two clubs from Hesse in the 3. Liga, so they qualify directly for the Hesse Cup.

The final is played at a neutral location but the two finalists can agree to play the game at one of the two clubs home ground.

== Cup finals ==
Held annually at the end of season, these are the cup finals since 1945:

Season	Location	Winner	Finalist	Result	Attendance
1945–46		Eintracht Frankfurt	Rot-Weiss Frankfurt	3–2	
1946–47		Eintracht Wetzlar	FC Hassia Dieburg	3–0^{1}	
1947–48		Olympia Lampertheim	KSV Hessen Kassel	3–2	
1948–49		Kickers Offenbach	Eintracht Frankfurt	4–1	
1949–50		FC Hanau 93	Kickers Offenbach	4–0	
1950–51		SpVgg Bad Homburg	SV Jügesheim	5–0	
1951–52		FC 04 Oberursel	SG Gelnhausen	3–1 aet	
1952–53		SV 07 Nauheim	SpVgg Neu-Isenburg	2–1^{2}	
1953–54	not held				
1954–55		CSC 03 Kassel	FC Union Niederrad	2–1	
1955–56	not held				
1956–57		Eintracht Wetzlar	SV Kilianstädten	1–0^{3}	
1957–58		Viktoria Urberach	VfL Marburg	1–0	
1958–59		Germania Okriftel	Germania Marburg	4–2	
1959–60		SG Kelkheim	Hermannia Kassel	2–1	
1960–61		KSV Hessen Kassel II	FC Arheilgen	3–2	
1961–62		FVgg. Kastel 06	FV 09 Breidenbach	3–1^{4}	
1962–63		Hünfelder SV	Eintracht Stadtallendorf	2–1	
1963–64		VfB Gießen	FC Homberg	2–1	
1964–65		Germania Wiesbaden	1. FC Langen	5–3	
1965–66		SV Darmstadt 98 II	SV Niederselters	5–2	
1966–67		FV 09 Breidenbach	SV Somborn	4–1	
1967–68		SG Westend Frankfurt	KSV Hessen Kassel II	3–1	
1968–69		Eintracht Frankfurt II	SV Hermanstein	3–2 aet	
1969–70		SG Westend Frankfurt	FV 09 Breidenbach	4–2	
1970–71		Rot-Weiß Frankfurt	SV Darmstadt 98	3–2 aet	
1971–72		VfB Gießen	TSV Wabern	4–1 aet	
1972–73		FC Nieder-Florstadt	SSV Auf der Heide Bottenhorn	2–1	
1973–74		Rot-Weiß Frankfurt	TSV Klein-Linden	2–1	
1974–75		VfR Oli Bürstadt	KSV Hessen Kassel	3–0	
1975–76		SSV Dillenburg	SV Wiesbaden	4–0	
1976–77		VfR Oli Bürstadt	Gladenbacher SC	9–0	
1977–78		FC Hanau 93	Viktoria Sindlingen	4–0	
1978–79		VfB Gießen	Viktoria Sindlingen	5–2	
1979–80		RSV Würges	SV Buchonia Flieden	2–0	
1980–81		TuSpo Ziegenhain	Viktoria Griesheim	3–0	
1981–82		KSV Baunatal	FSV Frankfurt	7–0	
1982–83		KSV Baunatal	SpVgg Neu-Isenburg	3–2	
1983–84		Eintracht Haiger	CSC 03 Kassel	6–5 pen	
1984–85		SC Neukirchen	FC Ebach	2–0	
1985–86		SKV Mörfelden	FSV Frankfurt	2–1	
1986–87		RSV Würges	KSV Baunatal	6–1	
1987–88		SV Wehen	FC Germania Dörnigheim	3–2	
1988–89		Rot-Weiß Frankfurt	SV Wiesbaden	2–0	
1989–90		FSV Frankfurt	Eintracht Haiger	5–1	
1990–91		Viktoria Aschaffenburg	SC Neukirchen	2–1	
1991–92		Rot-Weiß Frankfurt	SV Wehen	2–0	
1992–93		Kickers Offenbach	Borussia Fulda	3–2	
1993–94		SG Egelsbach	Rot-Weiss Frankfurt	3–1	
1994–95		SC Neukirchen	FV Bad Vilbel	2–1	
1995–96	Marburg, 9 June 1996	SV Wehen	SC Neukirchen	3–2 aet	650
1996–97	10 June 1997	SC Neukirchen	FC Herborn	2–1	
1997–98	Grünberg, 31 May 1998	SG Hoechst	SC Neukirchen	4–1 pen	800
1998–99	Aschaffenburg	SV Darmstadt 98	Borussia Fulda	4–0	
1999–2000	Alsfeld, 4 June 2000	SV Wehen	TuSpo Guxhagen	5–1	
2000–01	Hanau, 30 May 2001	SV Darmstadt 98	SV Wehen	2–1	1,000
2001–02	Offenbach, 29 May 2002	Kickers Offenbach	SC Neukirchen	1–0 aet	4,500
2002–03	Rüsselsheim, 4 June 2003	Kickers Offenbach	SV Wehen	3–2	2,000
2003–04	Offenbach, 6 June 2004	Kickers Offenbach	SV Bernbach	4–3 aet	3,065
2004–05	Eschborn, 10 August 2005	Kickers Offenbach	1. FC Eschborn	2–1 aet	
2005–06	Wiesbaden, 3 June 2006	SV Darmstadt 98	FSV Frankfurt	2–1	2,500
2006–07	Hanau, 6 June 2007	SV Darmstadt 98	KSV Klein-Karben	3–0	1,246
2007–08	Darmstadt, 28 May 2008	SV Darmstadt 98	Viktoria Aschaffenburg	2–0	3,300
2008–09	Offenbach, 27 May 2009	Kickers Offenbach	SV Darmstadt 98	1–0	
2009–10	Fulda, 11 May 2010	Kickers Offenbach	KSV Hessen Kassel	2–1	5,000
2010–11	10 May 2011	SV Wehen	KSV Hessen Kassel	3–0	
2011–12	Offenbach, 11 May 2012	Kickers Offenbach	FC Ederbergland	6–0	
2012–13	Offenbach, 21 May 2013	SV Darmstadt 98	SV Wehen Wiesbaden	4–0	
2013–14	Offenbach, 19 June 2014	Kickers Offenbach	SV Darmstadt 98	4–2 pen	4,590
2014–15	Kassel, 13 May 2015	KSV Hessen Kassel	VfB Gießen	2–1	6,100
2015–16	Haiger, 4 May 2016	Kickers Offenbach	SV Wehen Wiesbaden	2–1	
2016–17	Wiesbaden, 25 May 2017	SV Wehen Wiesbaden	SV Rot-Weiß Hadamar	1–1 (4–3 pen.)	
2017–18	Stadtallendorf, 21 May 2018	TSV Steinbach	Hessen Kassel	2–0	
2018–19	Baunatal, 25 June 2019	Wehen Wiesbaden	KSV Baunatal	8–1	
2019–20	Frankfurt, 22 August 2020	TSV Steinbach	FSV Frankfurt	1–0	0
2020–21	Haiger, 29 May 2021	SV Wehen Wiesbaden	TSV Steinbach Haiger	1–0	3
2021–22	Haiger, 29 May 2021	Kickers Offenbach	TSV Steinbach Haiger	1–0	
2022–23	Frankfurt, 3 June 2023	FSV Frankfurt	TSV Steinbach Haiger	2–2 (5–3 pen.)	
2023–24	Frankfurt, 25 May 2024	Kickers Offenbach	Türk Gücü Friedberg	3–2	
2024–25	Frankfurt, 24 May 2025	Wehen Wiesbaden	Hessen Kassel	1–1 (a.e.t.); 5–4 (p)	
2025–26	Offenbach, 23 May 2026	Wehen Wiesbaden	Barockstadt Fulda-Lehnerz	4–1	

- Source: "Ehrentafel der Hessenpokalsieger" (PDF) (in German). DSFS.
- Winners in **bold**

== Winners & finalists ==
Listed in order of wins, the Cup winners are:

Club	Wins	Finals	Years
Kickers Offenbach	13	14	**1949**, 1950, **1993**, **2002**, **2003**, **2004**, **2005**, **2009**, **2010**, **2012**, **2014**, **2016**, **2022**, **2024**
SV Darmstadt 98	7	10	**1966**^{†}, 1971, **1999**, **2001**, **2006**, **2007**, **2008**, 2009, **2013**, 2014
SV Wehen Wiesbaden	9	13	**1988**, 1992, **1996**, **2000**, 2001, 2003, **2011**, 2013, 2016, **2017**, **2019**, **2021**, **2025**, **2026**
Rot-Weiß Frankfurt	4	6	1946, **1971**, **1974**, **1989**, **1992**, 1994
SC Neukirchen	3	7	**1985**, 1991, **1995**, 1996, **1997**, 1998, 2002
VfB Gießen	3	4	**1964**, **1972**, **1979**, 2015
KSV Hessen Kassel	2	9	1948, **1961**^{†}, 1968^{†}, 1975, 2010, 2011, **2015**, 2018, 2025
RSV Würges	2	2	**1980**, **1987**
KSV Baunatal	2	4	**1982**, **1983**, 1987, 2019
FC Hanau 93	2	2	**1950**, **1978**
VfR Oli Bürstadt	2	2	**1975**, **1977**
SG Westend Frankfurt	2	2	**1968**, **1970**
Eintracht Frankfurt	2	3	**1946**, 1949, **1969**^{†}
Eintracht Wetzlar	2	2	**1947**, **1957**
TSV TSV Steinbach Haiger	2	5	**2018**, **2020**
FSV Frankfurt	2	5	1982, 1986, **1990**, 2006, **2023**
SG Hoechst	1	1	**1998**
SG Egelsbach	1	1	**1994**
Viktoria Aschaffenburg	1	2	**1991**, 2008
SKV Mörfelden	1	1	**1986**
Eintracht Haiger	1	2	**1984**, 1990
TuSpo Ziegenhain	1	1	**1981**
SSV Dillenburg	1	1	**1976**
FC Nieder-Florstadt	1	1	**1973**
FV 09 Breidenbach	1	3	1962, **1967**, 1970
Germania Wiesbaden	1	1	**1965**
Hünfelder SV	1	1	**1963**
FVgg. Kastel 06	1	1	**1962**
SG Kelkheim	1	1	**1960**
Germania Okriftel	1	1	**1959**
Viktoria Urberach	1	1	**1958**
CSC 03 Kassel	1	2	**1955**, 1984
SV 07 Nauheim	1	1	**1953**
FC 04 Oberursel	1	1	**1952**
SpVgg Bad Homburg	1	1	**1951**
Olympia Lampertheim	1	1	**1948**
Borussia Fulda	0	2	1993, 1999
SpVgg Neu-Isenburg	0	2	1953, 1983
Viktoria Sindlingen	0	2	1978, 1979
Barockstadt Fulda-Lehnerz	0	1	2026
Türk Gücü Friedberg	0	1	2024
SV Rot-Weiß Hadamar	0	1	2017
FC Ederbergland	0	1	2012
KSV Klein-Karben	0	1	2007
1. FC Eschborn	0	1	2005
SV Bernbach	0	1	2004
TuSpo Guxhagen	0	1	20001
FC Herborn	0	1	1997
FV Bad Vilbel	0	1	1995
FC Germania Dörnigheim	0	1	1988
FC Ebach	0	1	1985
Viktoria Griesheim	0	1	1981
SV Buchonia Flieden	0	1	1980
Gladenbacher SC	0	1	1977
SV Wiesbaden	0	1	1976
TSV Klein-Linden	0	1	1974
SSV Auf der Heide Bottenhorn	0	1	1973
TSV Wabern	0	1	1972
SV Hermanstein	0	1	1969
SV Somborn	0	1	1967
SV Niederselters	0	1	1966
1. FC Langen	0	1	1965
FC Homberg	0	1	1964
Eintracht Stadtallendorf	0	1	1963
FC Arheilgen	0	1	1961
Hermannia Kassel	0	1	1960
Germania Marburg	0	1	1959
VfL Marburg	0	1	1958
SV Kilianstädten	0	1	1957
FC Union Niederrad	0	1	1955
SG Gelnhausen	0	1	1952
SV Jügesheim	0	1	1951
FC Hassia Dieburg	0	1	1947

- Winning finals in **bold**.
- ^{†} Achieved by reserve team.
- ^{1} The 1947 cup final was replayed twice, with the first two games having ended drawn 3–3 and 2–2.
- ^{2} The 1953 final had to be replayed because the first game ended in a 1–1 draw.
- ^{3} The 1957 final was called off after 65 minutes because of crowd trouble and the SV Kilianstädten walking off the field. The game was awarded with the score at the time it was called off.
- ^{4} The 1962 final had to be replayed because the first game ended in a 1–1 draw after extra time.
