= Verbandsliga Hessen-Süd =

Football league in Germany

- Founded: 1965
- Country: Germany
- State: Hesse
- Number of clubs: 17
- Level on pyramid: Level 6
- Promotion to: Hessenliga
- Relegation to: Gruppenliga Darmstadt; Gruppenliga Frankfurt West; Gruppenliga Frankfurt Ost
- Domestic cup: Hessenpokal
- Current champions: Hanauer SC 1960 (2022–23)

The Verbandsliga Hessen-Süd, until 2008 named Landesliga Hessen-Süd, is currently the sixth tier of the German football league system. Before the introduction of the Regionalligas in 1994, the "Verbandsliga Hessen-S" served as the fourth tier of the German league system in the southern part of the state of Hesse. The league also served as the fifth tier of the league system before the introduction of the 3. Liga in 2008

== Overview ==
The Verbandsliga Hessen-Süd was formed in 1965 as the Landesliga Hessen-Süd, a tier four feeder league to the then Amateurliga Hessen.

The winners of the Verbandsliga Süd are automatically promoted to the Hessenliga, the runners-up need to compete with the runners-up of the Verbandsliga Hessen-Nord and the Verbandsliga Hessen-Mitte and the 15th placed team of the Hessenliga for another promotion spot.

The Verbandsliga Hessen-Süd is fed by the Gruppenliga Hessen-Darmstadt, Hessen-Frankfurt West and Hessen-Frankfurt Ost. The winners of those are automatically promoted to the Verbandsliga, the runners-up play-off for another promotion spot.

One Bavarian club plays within the area of the Verbandsliga Süd. FC Bayern Alzenau and, formerly, Viktoria Aschaffenburg have played in this league in the past. In 1992, FC Bayern Alzenau switched leagues, coming from the Landesliga Bayern-Nord straight across to the Verbandsliga Hessen-Süd and now, having been promoted, play in the Hessenliga. Viktoria Aschaffenburg have previously been promoted too, but in the 2010–11 season played in the Verbandsliga again. In 2012, Viktoria re-joined the Bavarian leagues.

Up until 1973 it was common for teams to move between Landesligen, resulting in the fact that some teams have won titles in two different Landesligen. This practice has since stopped.

Along with the renaming of the Oberliga Hessen to Hessenliga in 2008, the Landesliga was renamed Verbandsliga Hessen-Süd.

== League champions ==
The league champions:

=== Verbandsliga ===
The league champions since the renaming of the league in 2008:

Season	Club
2008–09	FSV Frankfurt II
2009–10	Rot-Weiß Darmstadt
2010–11	TGM SV Jügesheim
2011–12	SC Viktoria 06 Griesheim
2012–13	Sportfreunde Seligenstadt
2013–14	VfR Bürstadt
2014–15	SC Hessen Dreieich
2015–16	FC Viktoria 09 Urberach
2016–17	VfB Ginsheim
2017–18	FV Bad Vilbel
2018–19	Rot-Weiß Walldorf
2019–20	1. FC Erlensee
2020–21	Season curtailed and annulled
2021–22	SV Unter-Flockenbach
2022–23	1960 Hanau

- VfR Bürstadt declined promotion in 2014, runners-up SpVgg Oberrad promoted instead.

=== Landesliga ===
The league champions until the renaming of the league in 2008:

Season	Club
1965–66	Rot-Weiss Frankfurt
1966–67	FC Arheilgen
1967–68	VfR Bürstadt
1968–69	Eintracht Frankfurt II
1969–70	SG Germania Wiesbaden
1970–71	SV Wiesbaden
1971–72	VfR Groß-Gerau
1972–73	Hanau 93
1973–74	FV Sprendlingen
1974–75	SpVgg 03 Neu-Isenburg
1975–76	Hanau 93
1976–77	SC Viktoria 06 Griesheim
1977–78	Starkenburgia Heppenheim
1978–79	SG Egelsbach
1979–80	SpVgg Bad Homburg

Season	Club
1980–81	SpVgg Dietesheim
1981–82	FC Erbach
1982–83	Rot-Weiss Frankfurt
1983–84	Kickers Offenbach II
1984–85	Starkenburgia Heppenheim
1985–86	Rot-Weiss Frankfurt
1986–87	SpVgg Bad Homburg
1987–88	Rot-Weiss Walldorf
1988–89	SG Egelsbach
1989–90	SC Viktoria 06 Griesheim
1990–91	SG Egelsbach
1991–92	FV Bad Vilbel
1992–93	SV Mörlenbach 1896
1993–94	FV Progres Frankfurt

Season	Club
1994–95	SV 1919 Bernbach
1995–96	SV 07 Raunheim
1996–97	KSV Klein-Karben
1997–98	SpVgg Bad Homburg
1998–99	Kickers Offenbach II
1999–00	FC Croatia Frankfurt
2000–01	VfR Bürstadt
2001–02	Eintracht Wald-Michelbach
2002–03	SC Viktoria 06 Griesheim
2003–04	Viktoria Aschaffenburg
2004–05	SG Bruchköbel
2005–06	SV 1919 Bernbach
2006–07	1. FC Germania 08 Ober-Roden
2007–08	Kickers Offenbach II

- Four clubs have won the league three times each, Rot-Weiss Frankfurt, SpVgg 05 Bad Homburg, SC Viktoria 06 Griesheim and SG Egelsbach. However, SpVgg 05 Bad Homburg has also won the Landesliga Mitte in 1972, making it four Landesliga titles.
- Like SpVgg 05 Bad Homburg, Hanau 93, SV Wiesbaden and Kickers Offenbach II have also won titles in the Landesliga Süd and Mitte.

=== Additionally promoted teams ===
These clubs were promoted to the Oberliga after finishing second in the league:

Season	Club
1968–69	SV 09 Hofheim
1983–84	Hanau 93
1993–94	Viktoria Aschaffenburg
1996–97	VfR Bürstadt
1997–98	TGM SV Jügesheim
1998–99	SV Germania Horbach 1911
1999–00	SV Erzhausen
2000–01	TGM SV Jügesheim
2002–03	1. FC Germania 08 Ober-Roden
2004–05	FC Bayern Alzenau
2005–06	Rot-Weiss Frankfurt
2007–08	FC Viktoria 09 Urberach
2009–10	1. FCA Darmstadt
2010–11	Viktoria Aschaffenburg
2013–14	SpVgg 05 Oberrad
2014–15	Rot-Weiss Frankfurt
2015–16	Rot-Weiß Darmstadt
2017–18	Türk Gücü Friedberg
2018–19	Hanau 93

- Rot-Weiss Frankfurt holds the record for promotion to the Oberliga Hessen from Landesliga Süd, having achieved it four times.
