= FC Ederbergland =

German football club

- Full name: Fußballclub Ederbergland e.V.
- Founded: 1997
- Chairman: Dietmar Bienhaus
- Trainer: Frank Frede
- League: Hessenliga (V)
- 2015–16: Verbandsliga Hessen-Mitte (VI), 2nd (promoted)

FC Ederbergland is a German association football club from the city of Battenberg, Hesse. The club was formed through the merger of predecessor sides TSV Battenberg and SV Allendorf/Eder.

== History ==
Parent club Turn- und Sportverein Battenberg was formed in 1912 and was known briefly in 1949 as Fußball Sportverein Blau-Weiß Battenberg. TSV played in the third tier Amateuroberliga Hessen through much of the late 1980s before slipping into lower-level competition. The team made its only appearance in DFB-Pokal (German Cup) play in 1980, going out in the third round to VfL Osnabrück (4:0). TSV reemerged in the Oberliga Hessen (IV) in 1996–97, but had a poor season, and after a 16th-place finish was relegated to the Landesliga Hessen-Mitte (V).

On 10 March 1997 the club merged with Sportverein 1924 Allendorf/Eder to form FC Ederbergland Battenberg/Allendorf and carried on play as FC Ederbergland. The newly combined side captured the Landesliga title and returned to the Oberliga Hessen for a four-season turn that ended when they finished at the bottom of the table in 2001. Since then, the club has played in the Landesliga, renamed the Verbandsliga in 2008, except from 2005 to 2007, when it was briefly relegated. In 2013 the club came second in the Verbandsliga and, after winning the promotion round, moved up to the Hessenliga. After two seasons at this level, coming seventeenth in 2014 and fifteenth in 2015 the club was relegated from the Hessenliga again. It finished runners-up in the Verbandsliga in 2015–16 and, through the promotion round, returned to the Hessenliga.

== Honours ==
The club's honours:

- Landesliga Hessen-Mitte
  - Champions: 1998
- Hesse Cup
  - Runners-up: 2012
