= Sportfreunde Seligenstadt =

German football club

- Full name: Sportfreunde Seligenstadt e.V.
- Founded: 2 October 1946
- Manager: Lars Schmidt
- League: Hessenliga (V)
- 2015–16: 9th
Home colours	Away colours

Sportfreunde Seligenstadt is a German association football club based in Seligenstadt, Hesse.

== History ==
The club was founded 2 October 1946 and, in addition to a football department, included sections for athletics, chess, and table tennis. The following year a gymnastics department was added, and the club has since grown to include archery, fitness, Ju Jitsu, tennis, volleyball, and a seniors section.

The footballers played for a number of seasons in the Verbandsliga Hessen-Süd until winning the league in 2013 and earning promotion to the Hessenliga.

== Honours ==
The club's honours:

- Verbandsliga Hessen-Süd
  - Champions: 2013
  - Runners-up: 2009
