= Rot-Weiß Darmstadt =

German football club

- Full name: Sport- und Kulturverein; Rot-Weiß Darmstadt 1954 e. V.
- Founded: 1954; 71 years ago
- Chairman: Harry Distelmann
- Trainer: Stephan Adam
- League: Hessenliga (V)
- 2015–16: Verbandsliga Hessen-Süd (VI), 2nd (promoted)
- Website: https://www.rot-weiss-darmstadt.de/
Home colours

Rot-Weiß Darmstadt is a German association football club based in Darmstadt, Hesse.

The club's greatest success has been promotion to the Hessenliga, which it achieved for the first time in 2010.

== History ==
Rot-Weiß was formed in 1954, shortly after the Miracle of Bern, which was one of the motivations to establish the football club. For the most part of its history, the club existed in the lower amateur leagues. In 2007 a title in the tier six Bezirksoberliga Darmstadt took the club up to the Landesliga Hessen-Süd. The team became a top side in the league and took only three seasons to win the league championship, earning promotion to the Hessenliga in 2010, alongside local rival 1. FCA Darmstadt, who finished runners-up. After five seasons in the league with an eighth place in 2012 as its best result the club came second-last in 2014–15 and was relegated. In the following season the club made a return to the Hessenliga after a runners-up finish in the Verbandsliga and the promotion round.

== Honours ==
The club's honours:

=== League ===
- Verbandsliga Hessen-Süd
  - Champions: 2010
- Bezirksoberliga Darmstadt
  - Champions: 2007

== Recent managers ==
Recent managers of the club:

| Manager | Start | Finish |
|---|---|---|
| Stephan Adam | 1 July 2010 | Present |

== Recent seasons ==
The recent season-by-season performance of the club:

| Season | Division | Tier | Position |
|---|---|---|---|
| 2004–05 | Bezirksoberliga Darmstadt | VI | 2nd |
| 2005–06 | Bezirksoberliga Darmstadt | VI | 3rd |
| 2006–07 | Bezirksoberliga Darmstadt | VI | 1st ↑ |
| 2007–08 | Landesliga Hessen-Süd | V | 5th |
| 2008–09 | Verbandsliga Hessen-Süd | VI | 3rd |
| 2009–10 | Verbandsliga Hessen-Süd | VI | 1st ↑ |
| 2010–11 | Hessenliga | V | 11th |
| 2011–12 | Hessenliga | V | 8th |
| 2012–13 | Hessenliga | V | 12th |
| 2013–14 | Hessenliga | V | 13th |
| 2014–15 | Hessenliga | V | 16th ↓ |
| 2015–16 | Verbandsliga Hessen-Süd | VI | 2nd ↑ |
| 2016–17 | Hessenliga | V | |

- With the introduction of the Regionalligas in 1994 and the 3. Liga in 2008 as the new third tier, below the 2. Bundesliga, all leagues below dropped one tier. Also in 2008, a large number of football leagues in Hesse were renamed, with the Oberliga Hessen becoming the Hessenliga, the Landesliga becoming the Verbandsliga, the Bezirksoberliga becoming the Gruppenliga and the Bezirksliga becoming the Kreisoberliga.

| ↑ Promoted | ↓ Relegated |
