= Spvgg 05 Oberrad =

German football club

Spvgg Oberrad
- Full name: Spielvereinigung 05 Frankfurt-Oberrad
- Founded: 1905
- Manager: Marcus Spahn
- League: Verbandsliga Hessen-Süd (VI)
- 2015–16: Hessenliga (V), 16th (relegated)
| Home colours | Away colours |

Spvgg 05 Oberrad is a German association football club based in the Oberrad district of Frankfurt, Hesse.

== History ==
Predecessor side, Sportverein Oberrad, was formed in 1905 out of the union of the clubs Viktoria Oberrad, Kickers Oberrad and Sportclub Hellas. In 1933 this club merged with Ballspielclub Oberrad to form Spielvereinigung 05 Frankfurt-Oberrad

By the end of the 1930s the club had advanced to play in the second division Bezirksliga. The destruction during World War II of the city quarter where the team was based led to the collapse of the club in 1943. It was re-established after the war in 1945 as SG Oberrad before re-claiming its original name a year later.

The football team is an elevator club moving frequently between fourth and fifth division play. The club made its first appearance in the Landesliga Süd in the 1978–79 season but was immediately relegated. They returned in 1983 and stayed up for a half dozen seasons before being sent down again in 1989. Obberrad then had a pair of three season long turns in the Landesliga in 1993–96 and 1999–2002.

The club has played as a mid-to-lower table side in Landesliga competition with their best result being a 6th-place finish in 1993–94. Oberrad again earned promotion to the Landesliga Hessen-Süd (IV) after a successful 2005 campaign in the Bezirksoberliga Frankfurt (V) that saw the club finish in second place. After nine consecutive seasons in the Verbandsliga, Oberrad was promoted to the Hessenliga after a runners-up finish in 2014 but relegated from this league again in 2016.

The club places emphasis on its youth sides and has the largest youth program in the Main-Rhein area.

== Honours ==
- Verbandsliga Hessen-Süd (VI)
  - Runners-up: 2014
