= SC Hessen Dreieich =

German football club

- Full name: Sportclub Hessen Dreieich e.V.
- Founded: 20 June 2013
- Dissolved: 1 July 2024
- Ground: Sportpark Dreieich
Home colours

SC Hessen Dreieich was a German association football club from the town of Dreieich, Hesse. The club's greatest success was promotion to the fourth tier in 2018.

== History ==
SC Hessen Dreieich was formed on 20 June 2013 to consolidate the local football clubs in the region after cuts in the community budged reduced the support for these by 20 percent. The new club had the support of Hans Nolte, owner of Hahn Air, who invested €2.5 million in a new stadium for the club. The new club took up the league place of the SKG Sprendlingen which had won promotion from the tier seven Gruppenliga to the Verbandsliga Hessen-Süd at the end of the 2012–13 season. A number of local clubs initially complained about the new club, coached by former Bundesliga player Thomas Epp, claiming it was poaching youth and senior players from them.

The new club finished ninth in the Verbandsliga in its first season and won the league the year after. Through this the club won promotion to the tier five Hessenliga for 2015–16. With Zubayr Amiri and Khaibar Amani the club had two players from the Afghanistan national football team in their squad in 2015–16.

On 15 March 2020, the club announced that it would initially withdraw its first team from competition with the end of the 2019–20 Hessenliga season. This decision was motivated by a desire to focus the club's activities and financial resources more towards its youth teams. Hessen Dreieich's spot in the league was to be filled by the newly founded International Soccer Club Rhein-Main (ISCRM). However, because of the coronavirus disease pandemic in Germany, the Hessian Football Association froze ISCRM's application to join the Hessenliga on 27 April and Dreieich had to continue participating in the league for 2020–21.

The men's team withdrew from the Hessenliga at the end of the 2021–22 season and was not represented in the senior division in the next one. Some players from the Hessenliga squad were transferred to Eintracht Frankfurt's U21 team, which competed in the Hessenliga for the 2022–23 season. Dreieich had several youth teams also in 2022–23, ranging in ages from 11 to 17, or E- to B-juniors. In March 2024, the remaining youth teams were also spun off and from 1 July, Dreiech's football department was absorbed into FV 1906 Sprendlingen.

== Honours ==
The club's honours:

- Hessenliga
  - Champions: 2016–17, 2017–18
- Verbandsliga Hessen-Süd
  - Champions: 2013–14

== Seasons ==
The season-by-season performance of the club:

Season	Division	Tier	Position
2013–14	Verbandsliga Hessen-Süd	VI	9th
2014–15	Verbandsliga Hessen-Süd	VI	1st ↑
2015–16	Hessenliga	V	13th
2016–17	Hessenliga	V	1st
2017–18	Hessenliga	V	1st ↑
2018–19	Regionalliga Südwest	IV	18th ↓
2019–20	Hessenliga	V	7th
2020–21	Hessenliga	V	2nd
2021–22	Hessenliga	V	3rd

↑ Promoted	↓ Relegated
