= Hessenliga =

Hesse's highest football league and football league system

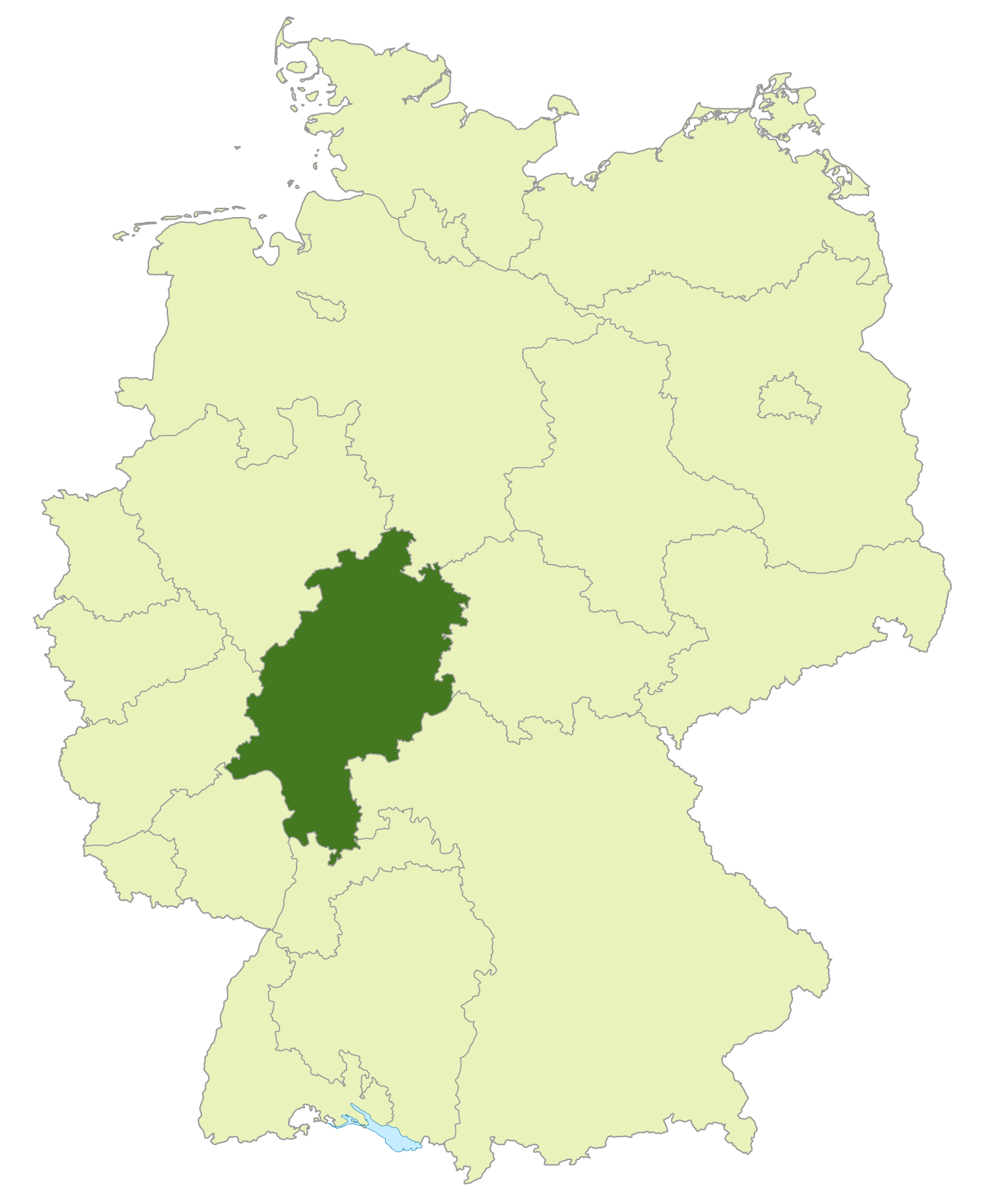
- Organising body: Hessian Football Association
- Founded: 1945
- Country: Germany
- State: Hesse
- Other club from: Bavaria
- Number of clubs: 20
- Level on pyramid: Level 5
- Promotion to: Regionalliga Südwest
- Relegation to: Verbandsliga Hessen-Nord; Verbandsliga Hessen-Mitte; Verbandsliga Hessen-Süd
- Domestic cup: Hessenpokal
- Current champions: FSV Fernwald (2024–25)
- Current: 2026–27 Oberliga Hessen

The Hessenliga (until 2008 Oberliga Hessen) is the highest football league in the state of Hesse and the Hessian football league system. It is one of fourteen Oberligas in German football, the fifth tier of the German football league system. Until the introduction of the 3. Liga in 2008 it was the fourth tier of the league system, until the introduction of the Regionalligas in 1994 the third tier.

== Overview ==
The league was formed in 1945, and except for its first two seasons, it has always played as one single division. The league was called Landesliga-Hessen until 1950 and actually formed the second tier of southern German football. With the introduction of the 2nd Oberliga Süd in 1950, the Landesliga-Hessen was renamed Amateurliga Hessen. In 1978, it was called Amateur Oberliga Hessen, and finally, in 1994 it was renamed Oberliga Hessen.

Since the introduction of the Regionalliga Süd in 1994, the winner of the Oberliga Hessen is automatically promoted to this league. Until 1994 the winners of the Oberligas had to play-off for the four promotion spots to the 2. Bundesliga with the other Oberliga winners.

In 1994, with the introduction of the Regionalliga, six clubs from Hesse were qualified for the new league, based on their performance over the last three seasons, these clubs being:

- Kickers Offenbach
- SV Wehen Wiesbaden
- SG Egelsbach
- Rot-Weiss Frankfurt
- KSV Hessen Kassel
- SV Darmstadt 98

Originally, FSV Frankfurt, champions of 1994, would have also been qualified but gained promotion to the 2. Bundesliga instead.

The Oberliga Hessen still remained below the Regionalliga Süd after the reduction of the number of Regionalligas from four to two in 2000 but this reduction meant that the Oberliga champions in that year were not promoted.

With the changes in the league system in 2008, four clubs from the Hessenliga were promoted to Regionalliga Süd after the 2007–08 season, nominally the top four teams, however, there were also financial requirements to receive a Regionalliga licence. The four clubs were:

- SV Darmstadt 98
- SV Wehen II
- Viktoria Aschaffenburg
- Eintracht Frankfurt II

The Hessenliga is fed by the three Verbandsligen. The winners of those are directly promoted to the Hessenliga, the three runners-up play-off for one more promotion spot.

- Feeder leagues to the Hessenliga:
  - Verbandsliga Hessen-Nord
  - Verbandsliga Hessen-Mitte
  - Verbandsliga Hessen-Süd

The Hessenliga also, at times, accommodated teams from Bavaria, Viktoria Aschaffenburg and FC Bayern Alzenau. In the 2011–12 season, Viktoria played in the league while Alzenau played one level above in the Regionalliga.

From 2012 onwards, the league became a feeder league to the new Regionalliga Südwest, together with the Oberliga Baden-Württemberg and the Oberliga Rheinland-Pfalz/Saar. The previous league the Hessenliga was set below at, the Regionalliga Süd, was disbanded after the 2011–12 season.

== Champions ==
The league champions since 1945:

Season	Club
1945–46	SV Wiesbaden
1945–46	Viktoria Aschaffenburg
1946–47	1. Rödelheimer FC 02
1946–47	Rot-Weiss Frankfurt
1947–48	1. Rödelheimer FC 02
1948–49	KSV Hessen Kassel
1949–50	SV Darmstadt 98
1950–51	Olympia Lampertheim
1951–52	Olympia Lampertheim
1952–53	FC Hanau 93
1953–54	Borussia Fulda
1954–55	SpVgg Bad Homburg
1955–56	SpVgg Neu-Isenburg
1956–57	Borussia Fulda
1957–58	VfB Friedberg
1958–59	VfL Marburg
1959–60	Borussia Fulda
1960–61	FC Hanau 93
1961–62	SV Darmstadt 98
1962–63	VfB Gießen
1963–64	SV Darmstadt 98
1964–65	Opel Rüsselsheim
1965–66	Germania Wiesbaden
1966–67	SV Wiesbaden
1967–68	Rot-Weiss Frankfurt
1968–69	FSV Frankfurt
1969–70	Eintracht Frankfurt II
1970–71	SV Darmstadt 98

Season	Club
1971–72	VfR Bürstadt
1972–73	FSV Frankfurt
1973–74	Viktoria Aschaffenburg
1974–75	FSV Frankfurt
1975–76	KSV Baunatal
1976–77	VfR Bürstadt
1977–78	FC Hanau 93
1978–79	VfR Bürstadt
1979–80	KSV Hessen Kassel
1980–81	Viktoria Griesheim
1981–82	FSV Frankfurt
1982–83	VfR Bürstadt
1983–84	VfR Bürstadt
1984–85	Viktoria Aschaffenburg
1985–86	Kickers Offenbach
1986–87	Kickers Offenbach
1987–88	Viktoria Aschaffenburg
1988–89	KSV Hessen Kassel
1989–90	Rot-Weiss Frankfurt
1990–91	KSV Hessen Kassel
1991–92	Viktoria Aschaffenburg
1992–93	Kickers Offenbach
1993–94	FSV Frankfurt
1994–95	SC Neukirchen
1995–96	Borussia Fulda
1996–97	SV Wehen
1997–98	FSV Frankfurt

Season	Club
1998–99	SV Darmstadt 98
1999–00	KSV Klein-Karben
2000–01	Borussia Fulda
2001–02	Eintracht Frankfurt II
2002–03	1. FC Eschborn
2003–04	SV Darmstadt 98
2004–05	1. FC Eschborn
2005–06	KSV Hessen Kassel
2006–07	FSV Frankfurt
2007–08	SV Darmstadt 98
2008–09	SC Waldgirmes
2009–10	FSV Frankfurt II
2010–11	FC Bayern Alzenau
2011–12	1. FC Eschborn
2012–13	KSV Baunatal
2013–14	TGM SV Jügesheim
2014–15	TSV Steinbach
2015–16	Teutonia Watzenborn-Steinberg
2016–17	SC Hessen Dreieich
2017–18	SC Hessen Dreieich
2018–19	FC Gießen
2019–20	TSV Eintracht Stadtallendorf
2020–21	None
2021–22	SG Barockstadt Fulda-Lehnerz
2022–23	Eintracht Frankfurt II
2023–24	FC Gießen
2024–25	FSV Fernwald

- The record number of league championships is held by FSV Frankfurt, with eight titles (including one won by their reserve team, FSV Frankfurt II).
- In 2014, the champions TGM SV Jügesheim declined promotion and no other team that applied for a Regionalliga licence finished high enough in the league to qualify.
- In 2017, the champions Hessen Dreieich declined promotion. The runners-up, TSV Eintracht Stadtallendorf, were promoted instead.
- In 2021 there was no champion or promotion because of the decision to curtail the season during the COVID-19 pandemic in Germany.
- In 2017, the champions FSV Fernwald declined promotion. The runners-up, Bayern Alzenau, were promoted instead.

== League placings ==
The complete list of clubs and placings in the league since being renamed to Hessenliga in 2008:

Club	09	10	11	12	13	14	15	16	17	18	19	20	21	22	23	24	25
TSV Steinbach Haiger							1	R	R	R	R	R	R	R	R	R	R
Viktoria Aschaffenburg	R	10		R	R	R	1	R	2	1	R	R	R	R	R	R	R
KSV Hessen Kassel	R	R	R	R	R	R	R	R	R	R	3	2	R	R	R	R	R
SG Barockstadt Fulda-Lehnerz^{1}						4	2	3	7	3	5	4	1	1	R	R	R
Eintracht Frankfurt II	R	R	R	R	R	R									1	R	R
FC Gießen^{2}								1	R	4	1	R	R	R	2	1	R
FSV Fernwald	12	13	9	3	7	10						18	10	7	4	8	1
FC Bayern Alzenau	2	R	1	R	R	14	4	15	4	2	2	R	R	11	12	4	2
Türk Gücü Friedberg											13	11	5	14	3	2	3
Rot-Weiß Walldorf												9	3	12	7	10	4
Eintracht Stadtallendorf	8	4	8	15	9	11	9	5	2	R	R	1	R	2	5	12	5
SV Darmstadt 98 II																	6
KSV Baunatal	5	3	3	2	1	R	R	12	9	10	7	12	13	16	6	3	7
FC Eddersheim					17						8	3	19	4	11	6	8
Hünfelder SV	10	9	16		8	19					15		18	19		7	9
SC Waldgirmes	1	2	2	14	14					5	9	10	7	8	13	11	10
SV Adler Weidenhausen															14	9	11
Hanauer SC 1960																5	12
FC Hanau 93												14	4	15	8	13	13
VfB Marburg		12	18													14	14
SV Unter-Flockenbach															17		15
FSV Rot-Weiß Wolfhagen																	16
SV Steinbach									14	17		16	11	17	9	15	17
TuS Hornau																	18
TSV Steinbach Haiger II															20		19
Viktoria Griesheim					10	16	14	8	13	14	11	8	17	13	15	16	
1. FC Erlensee													20	5	10	17	
TuS Dietkirchen												15	15	10	16	18	
SV Neuhof												17	14	9	18		
SpVgg Hadamar				13	4	6	3	10	6	6	4	6	6	6	19		
SC Hessen Dreieich								13	1	1	R	7	2	3			
FV Bad Vilbel											10	13	12	18			
VfB Ginsheim										8	6	5	16	20			
SV Zeilsheim													9	21			
SV Buchonia Flieden	16		13	11	3	15	8	17		12	14		8	22			
FSC Lohfelden	19			9	6	12	12	4	11	9	12						
FC Ederbergland						17	15		12	13	16						
SpVgg 03 Neu-Isenburg										11	17						
Borussia Fulda	17							11	5	7							
Rot-Weiss Frankfurt	11	7	14	17				2	3	15							
OSC Vellmar	9	15	6	7	11	2	11	14	10	16							
Sportfreunde Seligenstadt						8	7	9	8								
Rot-Weiß Darmstadt			11	8	12	13	16		15								
Viktoria Kelsterbach									16								
Viktoria Urberach	3	11	7	5	15				17								
1. FC Eschborn	6	8	4	1	R	3	10	6									
SV Wiesbaden						9	5	7									
SpVgg Oberrad							13	16									
SV Wehen II	R	R	R	6	5	7	6										
1. FC Schwalmstadt		14	17				17										
TGM SV Jügesheim				10	2	1											
FSV Frankfurt II		1	R	R	R	5											
Kickers Offenbach II	4	5	5	12	13	18											
FSV Braunfels					16												
1. FCA Darmstadt			12	16	18												
Eintracht Wetzlar			10	18													
RSV Würges	14	6	15														
KSV Klein-Karben	7	16															
Germania Ober-Roden	15	17															
TSG Wörsdorf	13	18															
SVA Bad Hersfeld		19															
KSV Hessen Kassel II	18																

^{1} Formerly TSV Lehnerz
^{2} Formerly Teutonia Watzenborn-Steinberg

=== Key ===
Symbol	Key
OL B	Oberliga Süd (1945–63) Bundesliga (1963–present)
2O RL 2B	2nd Oberliga Süd (1950–63) Regionalliga Süd (1963–74): 2. Bundesliga (1974–present)
3L	3. Liga (2008–present)
R	Regionalliga Süd (1994–2012) Regionalliga Südwest (2012–present)
1	League champions
Place	Played in the a different Oberliga division
Place	League
Blank	Played at a league level below this league
