= TGM SV Jügesheim =

German football club

- Full name: Turngemeinde 1888 Sportverein 1915 Jügesheim e.V.
- Nickname(s): Giesemer
- Founded: 1888
- Dissolved: 2014
- Ground: Am Weichsee
- Capacity: 2,000
Home colours	Away colours

TGM SV Jügesheim is a former German football club based in Rodgau, Hesse.

== History ==
The club was formed in 2004 out of the merger of the gymnastics club Turngemeinde Jügesheim established on 22 July 1888 and Sportverein Jügesheim formed in September 1915 after the collapse of the local football side Teutonia Jügesheim. TGM and SV eventually merged to form the later-day association where the footballers became part of a sports club that characterized itself as a "family team" and included departments for basketball, bowling, gymnastics, hiking, judo and Jiu-Jitsu, cross country running, athletics, dance, table tennis, and volleyball.

Jügesheim played the 2001–02 season in the Oberliga Hessen (IV), but over the next two years slipped to the Bezirksoberliga Frankfurt Ost (VI), before returning to Landesliga level play in 2006. In 2011 they were promoted to the Hessenliga and in 2014 they won the league but financial and other constraints forced themselves to drop down two levels to the Gruppenliga (VII). The club was merged later that year into Turngesellschaft Jügesheim and became Jügesheimer Sport- und Kulturverein Rodgau.

The Jügesheimer women's team captured the Oberliga Hessen title in each of the last three seasons, as well as the Hessenpokal (Hesse Cup) in 2006 season. The cup win earned the team a place in the Women's DFB-Pokal where they were put out in the second round by second division side FF USV Jena. The next season they took part in the promotion round for the women's 2. Bundesliga-Süd. They were unsuccessful in the attempt, but qualified for the new Regionalliga Süd (III).

== Honours ==
The club's honours:

=== Men ===
- Hessenliga (V)
  - Champions: 2014
  - Runners-up: 2013
- Verbandsliga Hessen-Süd
  - Champions: 2011
  - Runners-up: 1998, 2001
- Bezirksoberliga Frankfurt-Ost
  - Runners-up: 2005
- Hesse Cup
  - Runners-up: 1951

=== Women's team ===
- Frauen-Oberliga Hessen (III)
  - Champions: 2005, 2006, 2007
- Frauen-Hessenpokal
  - Winners: 2006

== Recent managers ==
Recent managers of the club:

Manager	Start	Finish
Lars Schmidt	1 July 2010	30 June 2012
Andreas Humbert	1 July 2012	30 June 2014

== Recent seasons ==
The recent season-by-season performance of the club:

Season	Division	Tier	Position
1999–2000	Oberliga Hessen	IV	14th ↓
2000–01	Landesliga Hessen-Süd	V	2nd ↑
2001–02	Oberliga Hessen	IV	17th ↓
2002–03	Landesliga Hessen-Süd	V	6th
2003–04	Landesliga Hessen-Süd	V	14th ↓
2004–05	Bezirksoberliga Frankfurt-Ost	VI	2nd ↑
2005–06	Landesliga Hessen-Süd	V	13th
2006–07	Landesliga Hessen-Süd	V	6th
2007–08	Landesliga Hessen-Süd	V	14th
2008–09	Verbandsliga Hessen-Süd	VI	6th
2009–10	Verbandsliga Hessen-Süd	VI	8th
2010–11	Verbandsliga Hessen-Süd	VI	1st ↑
2011–12	Hessenliga	V	10th
2012–13	Hessenliga	V	2nd
2013–14	Hessenliga	V	1st

- With the introduction of the Regionalligas in 1994 and the 3. Liga in 2008 as the new third tier, below the 2. Bundesliga, all leagues below dropped one tier. Also in 2008, a large number of football leagues in Hesse were renamed, with the Oberliga Hessen becoming the Hessenliga, the Landesliga becoming the Verbandsliga, the Bezirksoberliga becoming the Gruppenliga and the Bezirksliga becoming the Kreisoberliga.

↑ Promoted	↓ Relegated
