= 1. FC Germania 08 Ober-Roden =

- Full name: 1. FC Germania 08 e.V. Ober-Roden
- Founded: 10 April 1908
- Ground: Sportanlage Frankfurter Straße
- Capacity: 1,000
- Chairman: Norbert Rink
- Manager: Günther Späth
- League: Gruppenliga Darmstadt (VII)
- 2015–16: 7th
- Website: https://germania-ober-roden.de
Home colours

1. FC Germania 08 Ober-Roden is a German association football club from Ober-Roden one of five former villages that today make up the town of Rödermark, Hesse.

== History ==
The club was established on 10 April 1908 by a group of two dozen young men at the Zum Schützenhof restaurant. Germania enjoyed some success in local play, but did not advance to regional level competition. The club was forced to suspend its activities during both world wars as many of its members were called away to serve in the armed forces. Following World War II the team played in the Amateurliga Hessen from 1952 to 1963, at that time the country's highest amateur league. Their best result was a third-place finish in 1960 behind SpVgg Bad Homburg, who then defeated them 2–1 in the promotion round for the 2nd Oberliga Süd (II).

After their descent in 1963, it would be nearly thirty years before the club returned to upper level regional play with an advance to the Landesliga Hessen-Süd (V) in 1992. A vice-championship in 2003 led to the Oberliga Hessen (IV) for a three season long stint. They returned to Oberliga play in 2007 on the strength of a Landesliga title. but once more were relegated after three seasons. In the Verbandsliga, in the following season, the club finished last and consequently dropped down to the tier seven Gruppenliga for 2011–12.

== Stadium ==
1. FC Germania 08 Ober-Roden play their home matches at Sportanlage Frankfurter Straße which has a capacity of 1,000.

== Honours ==
- Landesliga Hessen-Süd
  - Champions: 2007
  - Runners-up: 2003
