= VfL Marburg =

German sports club

Verein für Leibesübungen 1860 Marburg
Club details
Established	28 July 1860
Address	VfL 1860 Marburg Leopold-Lucas-Str. 46a 35037 Marburg
Club colours	blue + white
No. of members	2200 approx.
Internet
Official website	www.vfl1860marburg.de

VfL Marburg is the oldest sports club of the Universitätsstadt Marburg, Germany, having been established in 1860 as a gymnastics club.

== Sporting spectrum ==
VfL Marburg has 12 different sporting departments, in gymnastics, hockey, volleyball, lacrosse, handball, table tennis, badminton, fencing, swimming, athletics, fitness and music.

=== Football ===
From 1937, VfB Marburg belonged to the sports club, until separating in 1992 and reclaiming its historical identity as the Verein für Bewegungsspiele 1905 Marburg e.V.
