= FC Viktoria 09 Urberach =

German football club

- Full name: FC Viktoria 09 Urberach e.V.
- Founded: 1909
- Ground: Viktoria-Sportplatz
- Capacity: 2,000
- Chairman: Dietmar Schrod
- Manager: Max Martin
- League: Hessenliga (V)
- 2015–16: Verbandsliga Hessen-Süd (VI), 1st (promoted)
Home colours	Away colours

FC Viktoria 09 Urberach is a German association football club from the city of Rödermark, Hesse.

== History ==
The club was formed on 24 December 1909 but only entered competitive football in 1914.

In the years after the First World War, the club gradually improved, opening its new playing field in 1921 and winning the local cup competition in 1924. In 1926, a first league championship was archived and in 1930, the club won promotion to the Bezirksliga Main-Hessen, then the highest football league in the region, where it competed with clubs like FSV Mainz 05 and Wormatia Worms. Viktoria spent the next three seasons in this league but in 1933, when the new Gauliga system was introduced, it failed to make the cut for the Gauliga Südwest/Mainhessen.

After the Second World War, the club quickly returned to its status as a strong local amateur side, earning promotion to the Bezirksklasse Darmstadt in 1948. The club then proceeded to the 2nd Amateurliga Hessen, from where it gained promotion to the Hessenliga (III) in 1957, the highest league in the state.

In 1958, the club won the Hesse Cup and finished third in the Hessenliga, a strong achievement for the newly promoted side. Viktoria however could not maintain this quality of play and quickly slipped to the bottom half of the table in the coming seasons, resulting in relegation in 1961, when it was even placed behind local rival KSV Urberach.

The club was not part of the new Landesliga Hessen-Süd in 1965, when it was formed as the tier below the Amateurliga Hessen. Instead, a long spell in the lower amateur leagues followed which was only broken in 2002, when the club achieved promotion to the Bezirksoberliga Darmstadt (VI). From there, it moved up to the Landesliga Hessen-Süd in 2005. After two seasons of mid-table finishes in this league, the club earned promotion to the Hessenliga in 2008 on the strength of a second place, returning to the highest amateur league in Hesse for the first time in 47 years.

The club achieved an impressive start to the 2008–09 season and was leading the Hessenliga after 15 rounds despite having played two games less than most of the other teams. Its performance weakened somewhat after that but it nevertheless finished in a very respectable third place.

On 11 October 2008, Viktoria's goalkeeper Jürgen Hoffelner collided with a player from the opposition team, 1. FC Eschborn, and had to be saved by the team doctor from suffocating due to having swallowed his own tongue and was taken to the hospital in Frankfurt, where he was put into an artificial coma. The game was cancelled by the referee after this incident.

At the end of the 2012–13 season the club was relegated in unfortunate circumstances, having had to deregister its reserve team during the season and being consequently deducted six-point for this breach of rules, which pushed the club onto a relegation rank. A Verbandsliga championship in 2015–16 took the club back up to the Hessenliga.

== Honours ==
The club's honours:

=== League ===
- Verbandsliga Hessen-Süd
  - Champions: 2016
- Landesliga Hessen-Süd
  - Runners-up: 2008
- Bezirksoberliga Darmstadt
  - Champions: 2005

=== Cup ===
- Hesse Cup
  - Winners: 1958

== Recent managers ==
Recent managers of the club:

Manager	Start	Finish
Thomas Epp	1 July 2008	present

== Recent seasons ==
The recent season-by-season performance of the club:

Season	Division	Tier	Position
2003–04	Bezirksoberliga Darmstadt	VI	6th
2004–05	Bezirksoberliga Darmstadt	VI	1st ↑
2005–06	Landesliga Hessen-Süd	V	10th
2006–07	Landesliga Hessen-Süd	V	11th
2007–08	Landesliga Hessen-Süd	V	2nd ↑
2008–09	Hessenliga	V	3rd
2009–10	Hessenliga	V	11th
2010–11	Hessenliga	V	7th
2011–12	Hessenliga	V	5th
2012–13	Hessenliga	V	15th ↓
2013–14	Verbandsliga Hessen-Süd	VI	14th
2014–15	Verbandsliga Hessen-Süd	VI	9th
2015–16	Verbandsliga Hessen-Süd	VI	1st ↑
2016–17	Hessenliga	V	

- With the introduction of the Regionalligas in 1994 and the 3. Liga in 2008 as the new third tier, below the 2. Bundesliga, all leagues below dropped one tier. Also in 2008, a large number of football leagues in Hesse were renamed, with the Oberliga Hessen becoming the Hessenliga, the Landesliga becoming the Verbandsliga, the Bezirksoberliga becoming the Gruppenliga and the Bezirksliga becoming the Kreisoberliga.

↑ Promoted	↓ Relegated
