= VfR Bürstadt =

German football club

- Full name: Verein für Rasensport Bürstadt 1910 e. V.
- Founded: 1910
- Ground: Robert-Kölsch-Stadion
- Capacity: 12,000
- League: Kreisoberliga Bergstraße (VIII)
- 2019–20: 12th
Home colours	Away colours

VfR Bürstadt is a German association football club playing out of Bürstadt, Hesse. The team was founded 1 February 1910 as SC 1910 Bürstadt and took on the name VfR on 23 August 1919. Between 1973 and 1983 they played as VfR Oli Bürstadt in recognition of sponsoring firm Otto Limburg Bürstadt-Bobstadt.

== History ==
The club briefly rose to the highest level when playing in the Kreisliga Odenwald in 1921–22 and the Bezirksliga Main-Hessen for one season in 1932–33, but quickly disappeared back into lower-tier competition again. The club made two failed attempts (1933 and 1942) to qualify for the Gauliga Hessen (I), one of 16 regional top-flight divisions established in the 1933 reorganization of German football under the Third Reich. Following World War II, the club was reestablished and played briefly as SG Bürstadt.

Kickers enjoyed their greatest success during its sponsorship by OLI and stirred some excitement through the 1970s and 1980s as an overachieving side playing in Hesse's tier III leagues with occasional brave forays into the Regionalliga Süd (II) and 2. Bundesliga where they were the smallest club playing at that level. In 1973, they won the national amateur championship with a 3–0 victory over SC Victoria Hamburg. They made two more failed final appearances in 1976 and 1986, losing in turn to HSV Holzwickede (0–1) and BVL Remscheid (1–2 aet). VfR is one of the relatively few German clubs that have sold their naming rights to an outside sponsor, an arrangement that ended with the bankruptcy of OLI in 1982.

Their run of success ended in the 1990s with a series of poor finishes in the Amateur Oberliga Hessen (III) early in the decade. Beginning with the 1993–94 season, they bounced between the Oberliga Hessen (IV) and Landesliga Hessen-Süd (V) for nearly a decade before finally collapsing in 2002 and voluntarily accepting relegation all the way down to Bezirksliga (VII).

After a drop to the ninth tier in 2008–09 the club has recovered again and moved back up to the Gruppenliga (VII) in 2011–12, followed by promotion to the Verbandsliga in 2013. The team won the league title in the Verbandsliga in 2014 as well but, instead of accepting promotion to the Hessenliga the club withdrew to the tier eight Kreisoberliga Bergstraße instead for financial reasons.

== Honours ==
The club's honours:

=== League ===
- German amateur championship
  - Champions: 1975
- Oberliga Hessen
  - Champions: 1972, 1977, 1979, 1983, 1984
  - Runners-up: 1982, 1986
- Landesliga Hessen-Süd
  - Champions: 2001
  - Runners-up: 1997
- Verbandsliga Hessen-Süd
  - Champions: 2014
- Gruppenliga Darmstadt
  - Champions: 2013

=== Cup ===
- Hesse Cup
  - Winners: 1975, 1977

== Recent seasons ==
The recent season-by-season performance of the club:

Season	Division	Tier	Position
1999–2000	Landesliga Hessen-Süd	V	3rd
2000–01	Landesliga Hessen-Süd	V	1st ↑
2001–02	Oberliga Hessen	IV	18th ↓
2002–03	Bezirksliga Darmstadt-Süd	VII	↓
2003–04	Kreisliga A Bergstraße	VIII	1st ↑
2004–05	Bezirksliga Darmstadt-Süd	VII	2nd
2005–06	Bezirksliga Darmstadt-Süd	VII	6th
2006–07	Bezirksliga Darmstadt-Süd	VII	5th
2007–08	Bezirksliga Darmstadt-Süd	VII	15th ↓
2008–09	Kreisliga A Bergstraße	IX	2nd ↑
2009–10	Kreisoberliga Bergstrasse	VIII	6th
2010–11	Kreisoberliga Bergstrasse	VIII	1st ↑
2011–12	Gruppenliga Darmstadt	VII	8th
2012–13	Gruppenliga Darmstadt	VII	1st ↑
2013–14	Verbandsliga Hessen-Süd	VI	1st (withdrawn)
2014–15	Kreisoberliga Bergstraße	VIII	15th
2015–16	Kreisoberliga Bergstraße	VIII	10th
2016–17	Kreisoberliga Bergstraße	VIII	

- With the introduction of the Regionalligas in 1994 and the 3. Liga in 2008 as the new third tier, below the 2. Bundesliga, all leagues below dropped one tier. Also in 2008, a large number of football leagues in Hesse were renamed, with the Oberliga Hessen becoming the Hessenliga, the Landesliga becoming the Verbandsliga, the Bezirksoberliga becoming the Gruppenliga and the Bezirksliga becoming the Kreisoberliga.

↑ Promoted	↓ Relegated
