= List of clubs in the Hessenliga =

This is a list of clubs in the Hessenliga football league, including their final placings from 1945–46 to the current season. The league is the highest football league in the state of Hesse (German: Hessen) and is one of fourteen Oberligas in German football, the fifth tier of the German football league system. Until the introduction of the 3. Liga in 2008, it was the fourth tier of the league system, until the introduction of the Regionalligas in 1994 the third tier.

== Overview ==
The league was formed in 1945, at the end of the Second World War, as Landesliga Hessen, a tier-two league with in two regional divisions. From 1947 on, it has always played in a single division format. In 1950, it changed its name to Amateurliga Hessen and became a tier-three league following the formation of the 2. Oberliga Süd above it. In 1978, the league changed its name to Amateur-Oberliga Hessen. In 1994, when the Regionalliga Süd was formed, the league changed its official name once more, now to Oberliga Hessen, and became a tier four league. In 2008 the league as renamed to Hessenliga and became a tier five league when the 3. Liga was formed. In 2012 the league above it, the Regionalliga Süd, was disbanded and replaced by the Regionalliga Südwest.

=== League timeline ===
The league went through the following timeline of name changes, format and position in the league system:

Years	Name		Tier	Promotion to
1945–47	Landesliga Hessen-West	Landesliga Hessen-Ost	II	Oberliga Süd
1947–50	Landesliga Hessen		II	Oberliga Süd
1950–63	Amateurliga Hessen		III	2. Oberliga Süd
1963–74	Amateurliga Hessen		III	Regionalliga Süd
1974–78	Amateurliga Hessen		III	2. Bundesliga Süd
1978–81	Amateur-Oberliga Hessen		III	2. Bundesliga Süd
1981–94	Amateur-Oberliga Hessen		III	2. Bundesliga
1994–2008	Oberliga Hessen		IV	Regionalliga Süd
2008–12	Hessenliga		V	Regionalliga Süd
2012–	Hessenliga		V	Regionalliga Südwest

== List of clubs ==
This is a complete list of clubs, as of the 2022–23 season, sorted by the last season a club played in the league:

Club	No	First	Last	Best	Titles	Seasons
FC Hanau 93	21	1945–46	Present	1st	3	1952–53, 1960–61, 1977–78
Rot-Weiß Walldorf	14	1951–52	Present	3rd	—	—
SV Neuhof	4	1959–60	Present	9th	—	—
Eintracht Frankfurt II^{1}	37	1969–70	Present	1st	2	1969–70, 2001–02
KSV Baunatal	39	1970–71	Present	1st	2	1975–76, 2012–13
Viktoria Griesheim	23	1977–78	Present	1st	1	1980–81
SC Waldgirmes	15	2002–03	Present	1st	1	2008–09
FSV 1926 Fernwald^{3}	12	2005–06	Present	3rd	—	—
FC Bayern Alzenau^{13}	12	2005–06	Present	1st	1	2010–11
Eintracht Stadtallendorf	11	2008–09	Present	1st	1	2019–20
SpVgg Hadamar	11	2011–12	Present	3rd	—	—
FC Eddersheim	5	2012–13	Present	3rd	—	—
SV Steinbach	5	2016–17	Present	11th	—	—
Türk Gücü Friedberg	4	2018–19	Present	5th	—	—
FC Gießen	1	2018–19	Present	1st	1	2018–19
TuS Dietkirchen	3	2019–20	Present	10th	—	—
1. FC Erlensee	2	2020–21	Present	5th	—	—
TSV Steinbach II	0+	2022–23	Present	—	—	—
SV Unter-Flockenbach	0+	2022–23	Present	—	—	—
SV Adler Weidenhausen	0+	2022–23	Present	—	—	—
Hünfelder SV	16	1962–63	2021–22	5th	—	—
FV Bad Vilbel	19	1992–93	2021–22	3rd	—	—
SV Buchonia Flieden	19	1996–97	2021–22	3rd	—	—
SC Hessen Dreieich^{24}	6	2015–16	2021–22	1st	2	2016–17, 2017–18
VfB Ginsheim	5	2017–18	2021–22	5th	—	—
SG Barockstadt Fulda-Lehnerz	4	2018–19	2021–22	1st	1	2021–22
SV Zeilsheim	2	2020–21	2021–22	9th	—	—
KSV Hessen Kassel^{16}	22	1945–46	2019–20	1st	5	1948–49, 1979–80, 1988–89, 1990–91, 2005–06
SpVgg Neu-Isenburg	18	1945–46	2018–19	1st	1	1955–56
FSC Lohfelden^{26}	19	1993–94	2018–19	4th	—	—
FC Ederbergland^{14}	8	1998–99	2018–19	6th	—	—
Rot-Weiß Frankfurt	40	1945–46	2017–18	1st	3	1946–47, 1967–68, 1989–90
Borussia Fulda^{5}	39	1945–46	2017–18	1st	5	1953–54, 1956–57, 1959–60, 1995–96, 2000–01
OSC Vellmar	16	2000–01	2017–18	2nd	—	—
TSV Lehnerz^{23}	6	2013–14	2017–18	2nd	—	—
Teutonia Watzenborn-Steinberg^{25}	2	2015–16	2017–18	1st	1	2015–16
Viktoria Urberach	10	1957–58	2016–17	3rd	—	—
Rot-Weiß Darmstadt	5	2010–11	2016–17	8th	—	—
Sportfreunde Seligenstadt^{22}	4	2013–14	2016–17	7th	—	—
Viktoria Kelsterbach	1	2016–17	2016–17	—	—	
SV Wiesbaden^{11}	32	1945–46	2015–16	1st	2	1945–46, 1966–67
1. FC Eschborn^{21}	11	2001–02	2015–16	1st	3	2002–03, 2004–05, 2011–12
SpVgg Oberrad	2	2014–15	2015–16	13th	—	—
1. FC Schwalmstadt^{15}	7	2004–05	2014–15	12th	—	—
SV Wehen II^{20}	5	2007–08	2014–15	2nd	—	—
TSV Steinbach Haiger	1	2014–15	2014–15	1st	1	2014–15
Kickers Offenbach II^{12}	11	1971–72	2013–14	4th	—	—
TGM SV Jügesheim^{3}	6	1998–99	2013–14	1st	1	2013–14
FSV Frankfurt II^{1}	2	2009–10	2013–14	1st	1	2009–10
1. FCA Darmstadt^{17}	17	1967–68	2012–13	3rd	—	—
FSV Braunfels	4	1999–2000	2012–13	16th	—	—
Viktoria Aschaffenburg^{2}	43	1945–46	2011–12	1st	5	1945–46, 1973–74, 1984–85, 1987–88, 1991–92
Eintracht Wetzlar	23	1947–48	2011–12	3rd	—	—
RSV Würges	10	1983–84	2010–11	6th	—	—
VfB Marburg^{18}	14	1985–86	2010–11	7th	—	—
Germania Ober-Roden	17	1952–53	2009–10	3rd	—	—
KSV Klein-Karben	13	1997–98	2009–10	1st	1	1999–2000
TSG Wörsdorf	9	2001–02	2009–10	6th	—	—
SVA Bad Hersfeld	3	1998–99	2009–10	11th	—	—
KSV Hessen Kassel II	11	1967–68	2008–09	2nd	—	—
SV Darmstadt 98	12	1945–46	2007–08	1st	7	1949–50, 1961–62, 1963–64, 1970–71, 1998–99, 2003–04, 2007–08
FSV Frankfurt	26	1968–69	2006–07	1st	7	1968–69, 1972–73, 1974–75, 1981–82, 1993–94, 1997–98, 2006–07
SV 1919 Bernbach	11	1995–96	2006–07	2nd	—	—
SV Erzhausen^{4}	6	2000–01	2005–06	4th	—	—
SG Bruchköbel	1	2005–06	2005–06	16th	—	—
TSG Wattenbach	1	2005–06	2005–06	18th	—	—
Eintracht Wald-Michelbach	3	2002–03	2004–05	5th	—	—
SC Neukirchen^{6}	7	1992–93	2002–03	1st	1	1994–95
SG Hoechst^{7}	23	1945–46	2001–02	2nd	—	—
VfR Bürstadt	35	1946–47	2001–02	1st	5	1971–72, 1976–77, 1978–79, 1982–83, 1983–84
SG Walluf	2	2000–01	2001–02	13th	—	—
VfB Gießen^{8}	37	1951–52	2000–01	1st	1	1962–63
SG Croatia Frankfurt	1	2000–01	2000–01	17th	—	—
SGV Germania Horbach^{9}	1	1999–2000	1999–2000	10th	—	—
VfB Unterliederbach	3	1997–98	1999–2000	10th	—	—
SpVgg Bad Homburg^{19}	33	1946–47	1998–99	1st	1	1954–55
FV Steinau	2	1997–98	1998–99	8th	—	—
SG Egelsbach^{10}	7	1979–80	1997–98	4th	—	—
FC Herborn	4	1994–95	1997–98	10th	—	—
SV Raunheim	2	1996–97	1997–98	13th	—	—
VfR Limburg	4	1964–65	1996–97	10th	—	—
Eintracht Haiger	17	1980–81	1996–97	2nd	—	—
SG Bad Soden	6	1980–81	1996–97	7th	—	—
TSV Battenberg^{14}	6	1984–85	1996–97	6th	—	—
Kickers Offenbach	9	1985–86	1996–97	1st	3	1985–86, 1986–87, 1992–93
SV Wehen	7	1989–90	1996–97	1st	1	1996–97
SC Willingen	2	1991–92	1995–96	16th	—	—
SV Mörlenbach	3	1993–94	1995–96	12th	—	—
FV Progres Frankfurt	2	1994–95	1995–96	3rd	—	—
RSV Petersberg	2	1965–66	1994–95	14th	—	—
Viktoria Sindlingen	13	1976–77	1990–91	5th	—	—
Hermannia Kassel	17	1947–48	1988–89	4th	—	—
FC Erbach	7	1982–83	1988–89	4th	—	—
CSC 03 Kassel	28	1947–48	1987–88	2nd	—	—
TuSpo Ziegenhain^{15}	9	1979–80	1987–88	4th	—	—
SpVgg Dietesheim	7	1981–82	1987–88	4th	—	—
Eintracht Baunatal	1	1986–87	1986–87	17th	—	—
Starkburgia Heppenheim	7	1978–79	1985–86	8th	—	—
Hessen Hersfeld	5	1981–82	1985–86	10th	—	—
VfR Schrecksbach	1	1983–84	1983–84	17th	—	—
Fvgg Kastel	13	1956–57	1982–83	4th	—	—
FSV Bergshausen	4	1978–79	1981–82	4th	—	—
FC Hochstadt	12	1969–70	1980–81	4th	—	—
SSV Dillenburg	8	1973–74	1980–81	2nd	—	—
Olympia Kassel	6	1952–53	1979–80	12th	—	—
VfR Groß-Gerau	7	1972–73	1978–79	6th	—	—
TSV Klein-Linden	3	1975–76	1977–78	11th	—	—
VfB Schrecksbach	1	1977–78	1977–78	18th	—	—
BC Sport Kassel	3	1974–75	1975–76	12th	—	—
FV Sprendlingen	2	1974–75	1975–76	16th	—	—
Opel Rüsselsheim	10	1945–46	1974–75	1st	1	1964–65
Eintracht Großenritte	2	1971–72	1973–74	17th	—	—
Germania Wiesbaden	13	1953–54	1972–73	1st	1	1965–66
SV Hofheim	4	1969–70	1972–73	10th	—	—
VfB Aßlar	2	1962–63	1971–72	10th	—	—
FSV Bischofsheim	2	1970–71	1971–72	14th	—	—
SG Westend Frankfurt	7	1964–65	1970–71	2nd	—	—
Kickers/Viktoria Mühlheim	4	1967–68	1970–71	5th	—	—
Kickers Obertshausen	8	1960–61	1968–69	6th	—	—
TuS Naunheim	1	1968–69	1968–69	15th	—	—
FV Biebrich	13	1945–46	1967–68	4th	—	—
FV Breidenbach	1	1967–68	1967–68	15th	—	—
VfL Marburg^{18}	13	1950–51	1965–66	1st	1	1958–59
Viktoria Preußen	3	1963–64	1965–66	3rd	—	—
TSV Heusenstamm	7	1958–59	1964–65	2nd	—	—
FC Langen	6	1958–59	1963–64	5th	—	—
SG Nieder-Roden	3	1961–62	1963–64	9t	—	—
VfB Friedberg	16	1945–46	1962–63	1st	1	1957–58
FC Burgsolms	1	1962–63	1962–63	14th	—	—
TSV Kirchhain	2	1960–61	1961–62	12th	—	—
SpVgg Griesheim	13	1945–46	1960–61	2nd	—	—
SV Herborn	3	1955–56	1960–61	11th	—	—
KSV Urberach	1	1960–61	1960–61	16th	—	—
FV Horas Fulda	5	1947–48	1959–60	5th	—	—
Olympia Lorsch	5	1955–56	1959–60	4th	—	—
Union Niederrad	11	1945–46	1958–59	4th	—	—
SV Asbach	1	1958–59	1958–59	16th	—	—
Germania Marburg	1	1956–57	1956–57	15th	—	—
Olympia Lampertheim	6	1950–51	1955–56	1st	2	1950–51, 1951–52
Sportfreunde Frankfurt	3	1955–56	1955–56	4th	—	—
SpVgg Nassau Wiesbaden	1	1954–55	1954–55	15th	—	—
SG Arheilgen	7	1946–47	1953–54	2nd	—	—
Germania Bieber	8	1945–46	1952–53	2nd	—	—
Germania Fulda	1	1951–52	1951–52	16th	—	—
Rödelheimer FC	5	1945–46	1950–51	1st	2	1946–47, 1947–48
VfL Kassel	3	1947–48	1950–51	6th	—	—
SV Kassel-Rothenditmold	2	1949–50	1950–51	15th	—	—
VfL Biedenkopf	1	1950–51	1950–51	18th	—	—
Hessen Lichtenau	1	1950–51	1950–51	20th	—	—
VfB Großauheim	4	1945–46	1948–49	2nd	—	—
FV Bebra	1	1948–49	1948–49	13th	—	—
TuS Löhneberg	1	1947–48	1947–48	14th	—	—
VfB Offenbach	2	1945–46	1946–47	4th	—	—
TSV 1860 Hanau	2	1945–46	1946–47	10th	—	—
SpVgg Klein-Karben	1	1946–47	1946–47	5th	—	—
VfL Germania	1	1946–47	1946–47	9th	—	—
SV Mörfelden	1	1946–47	1946–47	11th	—	—
Kewa Wachenbuchen	1	1946–47	1946–47	12th	—	—
SG Sachsenhausen	1	1945–46	1945–46	9th	—	—

=== Key ===
Denotes club plays in a league above the Hessenliga in 2022–23.	Denotes club plays in the Hessenliga in 2022–23.	Denotes club plays in a league below the Hessenliga in 2022–23.

Club	Name of club
No	Number of seasons in league
First	First season in league
Last	Last season in league
Best	Best result in league
Titles	Number of league titles won
Seasons	Seasons league titles were won in (Division titles in italics)

=== Notes ===
- ^{1} Eintracht Frankfurt II and FSV Frankfurt II withdrew from competitive football after the 2013–14 season.
- ^{2} Viktoria Aschaffenburg was relegated from the league after the 2009–10 season because it declared insolvency. The club moved from the Hessian league system to the Bavarian one at the end of the 2011–12 season.
- ^{3} TGM SV Jügesheim and FSV 1926 Fernwald withdrew from the league at the end of the 2013–14 season.
- ^{4} SV Erzhausen did not receive a licence for the 2006–07 season and was relegated.
- ^{5} Borussia Fulda did not receive a licence for the 2004–05 season and was relegated. The club withdrew its men's team from the league at the end of the 2017–18 season and integrated it into TSV Lehnerz to form SG Barockstadt Fulda-Lehnerz.
- ^{6} SC Neukirchen withdrew its team from the league at the end of the 2002–03 season.
- ^{7} SG Hoechst withdrew its team from the league at the end of the 2001–02 season.
- ^{8} VfB Gießen withdrew its team from the league at the end of the 2000–01 season. The club ceded its football section to Teutonia Watzenborn-Steinberg after the 2017–18 season, forming FC Gießen.
- ^{9} SGV Germania Horbach withdrew its team from the league at the end of the 1999–2000 season.
- ^{10} SG Egelsbach withdrew its team from the league at the end of the 1997–98 season.
- ^{11} SV Wiesbaden withdrew its team from the league at the end of the 1993–94 season and, again, after the 2015–16 season.
- ^{12} Kickers Offenbach II was relegated from the league at the end of the 1984–85 season because the senior team, Kickers Offenbach, was relegated from the 2. Bundesliga to the Oberliga.
- ^{13} FC Bayern Alzenau moved from the Bavarian league system to the Hessian one at the end of the 1991–92 season.
- ^{14} TSV Battenberg merged with SV Allendorf to form FC Ederbergland in 1997.
- ^{15} TuSpo Ziegenhain merged with Jahn Treysa to form 1. FC Schwalmstadt in 2004.
- ^{16} KSV Hessen Kassel went bankrupt in 1993 and re-formed as FC Hessen Kassel, taking the former's league place. FC Hessen Kassel went bankrupt in 1998 and re-formed as KSV Hessen Kassel, restarting in the lower amateur leagues.
- ^{17} 1. FCA Darmstadt played as 1. FC Arheilgen until 1970.
- ^{18} VfB Marburg was part of VfL Marburg from 1937 to 1992.
- ^{19} SpVgg Bad Homburg withdrew during the 1998–99 season after 16 games, declaring insolvency, and folded soon after.
- ^{20} SV Wehen Wiesbaden II withdrew from competition at the end of the 2014–15 season.
- ^{21} 1. FC Eschborn withdrew its team from the league to join the Gruppenliga at the end of the 2015–16 season.
- ^{22} Sportfreunde Seligenstadt withdrew its team at the end of the 2016–17 season.
- ^{23} TSV Lehnerz acquired the men's team of Borussia Fulda to become SG Barockstadt Fulda-Lehnerz in 2018.
- ^{24} SC Hessen Dreieich declined promotion for the 2017–18 season. Second-placed Eintracht Stadtallendorf was promoted instead. Dreieich withdrew its team from the league at the end of the 2021–22 season.
- ^{25} Teutonia Watzenborn-Steinberg merged with the football team of VfB Gießen to form FC Gießen in 2018.
- ^{26} FSC Lohfelden withdrew its team at the end of the 2018–19 season.

== Clubs and their placings ==
The clubs and their league placings:

=== Landesliga Hessen 1945–50 ===
The complete list of clubs and placings in the league while operating as the tier two Landesliga Hessen from 1945 to 1950. From 1945 to 1947 the league operated in two regional divisions:

Club	46	47	48	49	50
SV Darmstadt 98	9	3	5	3	1
Viktoria Aschaffenburg	1	OL	OL	4	2
KSV Hessen Kassel	8		2	1	3
SV Wiesbaden	1	12		5	4
SG Arheilgen		2	3	10	5
CSC 03 Kassel			8	2	6
Rot-Weiß Frankfurt	5	1	OL	8	7
Borussia Fulda	7		4	7	8
Union Niederrad	10	6		6	9
Rödelheimer FC	2	1	1	OL	10
Germania Bieber	2	4	10	9	11
VfB Friedberg	3	3	11		12
Hermannia Kassel			9	11	13
Eintracht Wetzlar			13		14
SV Kassel-Rothenditmold					15
VfL Kassel			6	12	
FV Bebra				13	
VfB Großauheim	5	2	7	14	
FV Horas Fulda			12		
TuS Löhneberg			14		
VfR Bürstadt		4			
SpVgg Neu-Isenburg	6	5			
SpVgg Klein-Karben		5			
SG Hoechst	10	6			
FV Biebrich	3	7			
VfB Offenbach	4	7			
Sportfreunde Frankfurt	4	8			
SpVgg Bad Homburg		8			
SpVgg Griesheim	8	9			
VfL Germania		9			
Opel Rüsselsheim	7	10			
TSV 1860 Hanau	11	10			
FC Hanau 93	6	11			
SV Mörfelden		11			
Kewa Wachenbuchen		12			
SG Sachsenhausen	9				

=== Amateurliga Hessen 1950–63 ===
The complete list of clubs and placings in the league while operating under the official name of Amateurliga Hessen as a tier-three league from 1950 to the introduction of the Bundesliga in 1963:

Club	51	52	53	54	55	56	57	58	59	60	61	62	63
SpVgg Neu-Isenburg				2	4	1	2O	2O	2O	2O	2O	2O	2O
Borussia Fulda	2	2	2	1	2	3	1	2O	2O	1	2O	2O	2O
FC Hanau 93	3	11	1	2O	2O	2O	2O	2O	2O	2O	1	2O	2O
SV Darmstadt 98	OL	2O	2O	2O	2O	2O	2O	2O	2O	2O	2O	1	2O
VfB Gießen		14	5	10	3	13	9	6	12	10	6	12	1
SV Wiesbaden	2O	2O	2O	2O	2O	2O	2O	2O	2O	2O	2O	2O	2
TSV Heusenstamm									10	6	2	2	3
FV Biebrich								12	15	14	4	10	4
Hünfelder SV													5
VfL Marburg	15				7	7	3	7	1	4	3	3	6
FC Langen									11	9	9	5	7
CSC 03 Kassel	4	18		4	5	11	7	10	4	16		4	8
Hermannia Kassel	8	4	16									6	9
VfB Aßlar													10
SG Nieder-Roden												9	11
VfR Bürstadt							13			7	10	7	12
Fvgg Kastel							11	4	6	5	8	8	13
FC Burgsolms													14
Germania Ober-Roden			6	8	9	12	5	8	7	3	13	13	15
VfB Friedberg	11	6	13	11	6	6	2	1	2O	8	5	11	16
Kickers Obertshausen											7	14	
Eintracht Wetzlar	7	3	9	12	12	8	8	14			11	15	
TSV Kirchhain											12	16	
SpVgg Bad Homburg	14		8	3	1	5	12	2	3	2	14		
SpVgg Griesheim	6	7	11	9	13	10	10	5	2	12	15		
KSV Urberach											16		
Viktoria Urberach								3	8	13	17		
SV Herborn						16				11	18		
Olympia Lorsch						9	4	11	9	15			
FV Horas Fulda		15						9	5	17			
SV Neuhof										18			
Union Niederrad	9	17			11	4	6	13	13				
Germania Wiesbaden				6	8	2	14		14				
SV Asbach									16				
BC Sport Kassel								15					
Germania Marburg							15						
Sportfreunde Frankfurt						14							
Olympia Lampertheim	1	1	7	5	10	15							
Rot-Weiß Walldorf		13	4	7	14								
SpVgg Nassau Wiesbaden					15								
Rot-Weiß Frankfurt	5	12	3	13	16								
Olympia Kassel			14	14									
SG Arheilgen	2O	8	10	15									
Opel Rüsselsheim	12	5	12	16									
Germania Bieber	10	9	15										
Hessen Hersfeld	13	10	17										
Germania Fulda		16											
Rödelheimer FC	16												
VfL Kassel	17												
VfL Biedenkopf	18												
SV Kassel-Rothenditmold	19												
Hessen Lichtenau	20												

=== Amateurliga Hessen 1963–78 ===
The complete list of clubs and placings in the league while operating as the tier three Amateurliga Hessen from 1963 to 1978:

Club	64	65	66	67	68	69	70	71	72	73	74	75	76	77	78
SV Darmstadt 98	1	RL	RL	RL	RL	RL	RL	1	RL	RL	RL	2B	2B	2B	2B
FSV Frankfurt	RL	RL	RL	RL	RL	1	RL	2	2	1	RL	1	2B	2B	2B
KSV Baunatal								16		12	3	4	1	2B	2B
VfR Bürstadt	5	7	13	14		6	4	7	1	RL	RL	2	2	1	2B
FC Hanau 93	16			10	17						14	18		4	1
Eintracht Frankfurt II							1	5	3	5	8	13	5	5	2
1. FCA Darmstadt					6	3	3	6	9	15	9	9	15	7	3
Viktoria Griesheim															4
SG Hoechst															5
KSV Hessen Kassel	RL	RL	RL	RL	RL	RL	RL	RL	RL	RL	RL	3	3	3	6
SSV Dillenburg											12	10	9	2	7
Hermannia Kassel	12	16		15			17						6	8	8
Viktoria Aschaffenburg	15		3	4	7	8	2	RL	11	13	1	8	12	6	9
FC Hochstadt							12	11	6	4	10	7	16	14	10
VfR Groß-Gerau										16	6	11	7	10	11
VfB Gießen	7	9	9	3	10	10	14	13	10	10	5	14	10	13	12
Olympia Kassel														16	13
SpVgg Bad Homburg			8	13	9	11	15			2	2	6	8	9	14
Rot-Weiß Frankfurt				6	1	RL	6	8	7	6	7	15	11	15	15
SV Wiesbaden	2	3	4	1	RL	2	18		4	11	4	5	4	12	16
TSV Klein-Linden													13	11	17
VfB Schrecksbach															18
Viktoria Sindlingen														17	
SpVgg Neu-Isenburg	RL	10	5	2	8	14	5	9	8	7	18		14	18	
FV Sprendlingen												16	17		
BC Sport Kassel												12	18		
Fvgg Kastel	18											17			
Borussia Fulda	RL	4	6	7	4	12	8	3	12	9	11	19			
Kickers Offenbach II									5	8	13				
KSV Hessen Kassel II					2	17			13	14	15				
Opel Rüsselsheim		1	RL	RL	RL	RL	RL	RL	RL	3	16				
Eintracht Großenritte									18		17				
SV Hofheim							10	10	14	17					
Germania Wiesbaden	13	5	1	RL	13	18		4	15	18					
VfB Aßlar									16						
FSV Bischofsheim								14	17						
CSC 03 Kassel	9	13	10	11	11	4	11	12	19						
SG Westend Frankfurt		2	2	5	3	5	9	15							
Kickers/Viktoria Mühlheim					5	7	7	17							
Eintracht Wetzlar	8	11	11	12	14	9	13	18							
Hünfelder SV	11	6	14	16		13	16								
TuS Naunheim						15									
Kickers Obertshausen	6	12	7	9	12	16									
FV Breidenbach					15										
FV Biebrich	4	8	12	8	16										
VfL Marburg	14	15	15												
Viktoria Preußen	3	14	16												
RSV Petersberg			17												
VfR Limburg		17													
TSV Heusenstamm	10	18													
FC Langen	17														
SG Niederroden	19														

=== Amateur-Oberliga Hessen 1978–94 ===
The complete list of clubs and placings in the league while operating as the tier three Amateur-Oberliga Hessen from 1978 to 1994 and feeding the 2. Bundesliga:

Club	79	80	81	82	83	84	85	86	87	88	89	90	91	92	93	94
FSV Frankfurt	2B	2B	2B	1	2B	3	10	5	3	5	4	8	6	5	2	1
Kickers Offenbach	2B	2B	2B	2B	2B	B	2B	1	1	2B	2B	3	3	7	1	2
SV Wehen												4	5	11	9	3
SG Egelsbach		8	14									17		4	4	4
Rot-Weiß Frankfurt	18					15	19		4	4	3	1	2	6	6	5
KSV Hessen Kassel	2	1	2B	2B	2B	2B	2B	2B	2B	2	1	2B	1	3	5	6
FV Bad Vilbel															13	7
Borussia Fulda							17						10	12	3	8
SV Darmstadt 98	B	2B	2B	B	2B	2B	2B	2B	2B	2B	2B	2B	2B	2B	2B	9
Eintracht Frankfurt II	5	5	5	3	2	5	3	7	11	11	8	10	8	9	12	10
SC Neukirchen															10	11
SV Wiesbaden					5	13	18		6	10	10	14	14	10	7	12
Eintracht Haiger			6	10	12	7	5	13	2	6	7	11	12	14	11	13
SV Mörlenbach																14
VfR Bürstadt	1	2B	2B	2	1	1	2B	2	5	9	6	5	13	13	14	15
FSC Lohfelden																16
Rot-Weiß Walldorf											9	12	11	8	8	17
SG Hoechst	7	14	9	8	7	16				8	5	6	7	15		18
Viktoria Aschaffenburg	11	3	2	9	3	2	1	2B	2B	1	2B	7	4	1	15	
SpVgg Bad Homburg	16		8	14	15					3	2	2	9	2	16	
VfB Marburg								12	10	14	15		17		17	
SC Willingen														16		
RSV Würges						14	15							17		
Viktoria Sindlingen	10	17		5	9	11	6	14	12	12	13	13	15			
KSV Baunatal	2B	2	10	4	6	6	7	3	7	7	12	9	16			
Viktoria Griesheim	3	11	1	6	8	4	12	10	13	18			18			
KSV Hessen Kassel II							11	8	16			15				
TSV Battenberg							9	6	15		11	16				
SG Bad Soden			13	7	16							18				
FC Erbach					4	9	14	9	9	13	14					
Hermannia Kassel	17										16					
SpVgg Dietesheim				11	13	8	13	4	8	15						
CSC 03 Kassel					11	12	2	15		16						
TuSpo Ziegenhain		9	4	12	10	10	16	11	14	17						
Eintracht Baunatal									17							
Starkburgia Heppenheim	8	13	15	13	14	18		16								
Hessen Hersfeld				17				17								
FC Hanau 93	2B	10	3	18			4	18								
Kickers Offenbach II							8									
VfR Schrecksbach						17										
Fvgg Kastel		7	12	15	17											
VfB Gießen	13	15	7	16												
FSV Bergshausen	4	4	11	19												
SSV Dillenburg	6	6	16													
1. FCA Darmstadt	9	12	17													
FC Hochstadt	14	16	18													
Olympia Kassel	12	18														
VfR Groß-Gerau	15															

=== Oberliga Hessen 1994–2008 ===
The complete list of clubs and placings in the league while operating as the tier four Oberliga Hessen and feeding the Regionalliga Süd:

Club	95	96	97	98	99	00	01	02	03	04	05	06	07	08
Kickers Offenbach	R	3	2	R	R	2B	R	R	R	R	R	2B	2B	2B
SV Wehen	R	7	1	R	R	R	R	R	R	R	R	R	R	2B
KSV Hessen Kassel	R	R	R	R					2	2	13	1	R	R
FSV Frankfurt	2B	R	7	1	R	R	4	2	3	6	2	2	1	R
SV Darmstadt 98	R	R	R	R	1	R	R	R	R	1	R	R	R	1
SV Wehen II														2
Viktoria Aschaffenburg	4	2	3	3	5	6	10	10	16		10	10	2	3
Eintracht Frankfurt II	2	R	8	6	4	4	5	1	R	9	12	11	5	4
SC Waldgirmes									18		3	3	3	5
TSG Wörsdorf								9	14	8	7	8	10	6
FC Bayern Alzenau												5	6	7
KSV Baunatal	15					12	2	14	6	11	4	14	13	8
Borussia Fulda	7	1	R	R	R	R	1	R	4	3			8	9
Germania Ober-Roden										5	11	17		10
FSV 1926 Fernwald												15	7	11
KSV Klein-Karben				11	3	1	8	5	10	12	6	9	4	12
FSC Lohfelden	9	9	11	12	9	5	16		17					13
RSV Würges			10	14									11	14
Rot-Weiß Frankfurt	R	15												15
SV Buchonia Flieden			17					15	13	7	9	4	9	16
Eintracht Wetzlar														17
1. FC Schwalmstadt											14	13	12	18
SV 1919 Bernbach		4	5	2	7	8	15	11	8	14	16		14	
FV Bad Vilbel	6	6	9	4	10	3	7	4	12	10	5	6	15	
1. FC Eschborn								12	1	R	1	R	16	
OSC Vellmar							9	13	15		15	7	17	
FSV Braunfels						17				16			18	
SV Erzhausen							12	6	9	4	8	12		
SG Bruchköbel												16		
TSG Wattenbach												18		
Eintracht Wald-Michelbach									5	13	17			
VfB Marburg						13	14	7	7	15	18			
Hünfelder SV										17				
Viktoria Griesheim										18				
SC Neukirchen	1	R	R	R	R	2	3	8	11					
SG Hoechst	8	8	4	5	2	7	11	3						
SG Walluf							13	16						
TGM SV Jügesheim					8	14		17						
VfR Bürstadt	5	14		13	14			18						
VfB Gießen		5	6	9	12	9	6							
SG Croatia Frankfurt							17							
FC Ederbergland					6	11	18							
SGV Germania Horbach						10								
Kickers Offenbach II						15								
SVA Bad Hersfeld					11	16								
VfB Unterliederbach				10	13	18								
FV Steinau				8	15									
SpVgg Bad Homburg					16									
SG Egelsbach	R	R	R	7										
SV Raunheim			13	15										
FC Herborn	10	12	12	16										
TSV Battenberg			14											
SG Bad Soden		11	15											
Eintracht Haiger	13	13	16											
VfR Limburg	11	10	18											
SC Willingen		16												
SV Mörlenbach	12	17												
KSV Hessen Kassel II		18												
FV Progres Frankfurt	3	19												
RSV Petersberg	14													
Rot-Weiß Walldorf	16													

=== Hessenliga 2008–present ===
The complete list of clubs and placings in the league while operating as the tier five Hessenliga and feeding the Regionalliga Süd (2008–2012) and Regionalliga Südwest (2012–present):

Club	09	10	11	12	13	14	15	16	17	18	19	20	21	22	23
Eintracht Frankfurt II	R	R	R	R	R	R									x
TSV Steinbach Haiger							1	R	R	R	R	R	R	R	R
Viktoria Aschaffenburg	R	10		R	R	R	1	R	2	1	R	R	R	R	R
FC Gießen											1	R	R	R	x
KSV Hessen Kassel	R	R	R	R	R	R	R	R	R	R	3	2	R	R	R
SG Barockstadt Fulda-Lehnerz											5	4	1	1	R
Eintracht Stadtallendorf	8	4	8	15	9	11	9	5	2	R	R	1	R	2	x
SC Hessen Dreieich								13	1	1	R	7	2	3	
FC Eddersheim					17						8	3	19	4	x
1. FC Erlensee													20	5	x
SpVgg Hadamar				13	4	6	3	10	6	6	4	6	6	6	x
FSV 1926 Fernwald	12	13	9	3	7	10						18	10	7	x
SC Waldgirmes	1	2	2	14	14					5	9	10	7	8	x
SV Neuhof												17	14	9	x
TuS Dietkirchen												15	15	10	x
FC Bayern Alzenau	2	R	1	R	R	14	4	15	4	2	2	R	R	11	x
Rot-Weiß Walldorf												9	3	12	x
Viktoria Griesheim					10	16	14	8	13	14	11	8	17	13	x
Türk Gücü Friedberg											13	11	5	14	x
FC Hanau 93												14	4	15	x
KSV Baunatal	5	3	3	2	1	R	R	12	9	10	7	12	13	16	x
SV Steinbach									14	17		16	11	17	x
FV Bad Vilbel											10	13	12	18	
Hünfelder SV	10	9	16		8	19					15		18	19	
VfB Ginsheim										8	6	5	16	20	
SV Zeilsheim													9	21	
SV Buchonia Flieden	16		13	11	3	15	8	17		12	14		8	22	
FSC Lohfelden	19			9	6	12	12	4	11	9	12				
FC Ederbergland						17	15		12	13	16				
SpVgg 03 Neu-Isenburg										11	17				
TSV Lehnerz						4	2	3	7	3					
Teutonia Watzenborn-Steinberg								1	R	4					
Borussia Fulda	17							11	5	7					
Rot-Weiß Frankfurt	11	7	14	17				2	3	15					
OSC Vellmar	9	15	6	7	11	2	11	14	10	16					
Sportfreunde Seligenstadt						8	7	9	8						
Rot-Weiß Darmstadt			11	8	12	13	16		15						
Viktoria Kelsterbach									16						
Viktoria Urberach	3	11	7	5	15				17						
1. FC Eschborn	6	8	4	1	R	3	10	6							
SV Wiesbaden						9	5	7							
SpVgg Oberrad							13	16							
SV Wehen II	R	R	R	6	5	7	6								
1. FC Schwalmstadt		14	17				17								
TGM SV Jügesheim				10	2	1									
FSV Frankfurt II		1	R	R	R	5									
Kickers Offenbach II	4	5	5	12	13	18									
FSV Braunfels					16										
1. FCA Darmstadt			12	16	18										
Eintracht Wetzlar			10	18											
RSV Würges	14	6	15												
VfB Marburg		12	18												
KSV Klein-Karben	7	16													
Germania Ober-Roden	15	17													
TSG Wörsdorf	13	18													
SVA Bad Hersfeld		19													
KSV Hessen Kassel II	18														
TSV Steinbach II															x
SV Unter-Flockenbach															x
SV Adler Weidenhausen															x

=== Key ===
Symbol	Key
OL B	Oberliga Süd (1945–63) Bundesliga (1963–present)
2O RL 2B	2nd Oberliga Süd (1950–63) Regionalliga Süd (1963–74): 2. Bundesliga (1974–present)
3L	3. Liga (2008–present)
R	Regionalliga Süd (1994–2012) Regionalliga Südwest (2012–present)
1	League champions
Place	Played in the a different Oberliga division
Place	League
Blank	Played at a league level below this league
