= 2014–15 Hessenliga =

- Season: 2014–15
- Champions: TSV Steinbach
- Promoted: TSV Steinbach
- Relegated: SV Wehen II; FC Ederbergland; Rot-Weiß Darmstadt; 1. FC Schwalmstadt
- Matches: 272
- Top goalscorer: Peter Sprung (27 goals)
- Total attendance: 73,823
- Average attendance: 271
- All statistics correct as of 17 December 2015.

The 2014–15 season of the Hessenliga, the highest association football league in the German state of Hesse, was the seventh season of the league at tier five (V) of the German football league system and the 37th season overall since establishment of the league in 1978, then as the Oberliga Hessen.

The season started on 1 August 2014 and finished on 6 April 2015.

== Final standings ==
The 2014–15 season saw three new clubs in the league, 1. FC Schwalmstadt, TSV Steinbach and SpVgg Oberrad, all promoted from the Verbandsligas while no club had been relegated from the Regionalliga Südwest to the league.

Pos	Team	Pld	W	D	L	GF	GA	GD	Pts	Promotion, qualification or relegation
1	TSV Steinbach (C, P)	32	20	6	6	66	31	+35	66	Promotion to Regionalliga Südwest
2	TSV Lehnerz	32	18	7	7	63	28	+35	61	Qualification to promotion playoffs
3	Rot-Weiß Hadamar	32	17	9	6	60	30	+30	60	
4	FC Bayern Alzenau (Note: FC Bayern Alzenau deducted two points for non-compliance with league requirements.)	32	19	5	8	55	29	+26	60	
5	SV Wiesbaden	32	18	3	11	65	40	+25	57	
6	SV Wehen Wiesbaden II (Note: SV Wehen Wiesbaden II withdrawn from competition at the end of the 2014–15 season.) (R)	32	16	6	10	51	37	+14	54	Withdrawn
7	Sportfreunde Seligenstadt	32	14	7	11	67	55	+12	49	
8	Buchonia Flieden	32	13	8	11	59	63	−4	47	
9	Eintracht Stadtallendorf	32	11	7	14	61	58	+3	40	
10	1. FC Eschborn	32	11	7	14	50	52	−2	40	
11	OSC Vellmar	32	11	6	15	50	60	−10	39	
12	FSC Lohfelden	32	11	5	16	52	59	−7	38	
13	SpVgg Oberrad	32	9	11	12	47	70	−23	38	
14	Viktoria Griesheim	32	9	10	13	34	51	−17	37	
15	FC Ederbergland (R)	32	9	6	17	41	57	−16	33	Relegation to Verbandsliga
16	Rot-Weiß Darmstadt (R)	32	8	8	16	47	69	−22	32	Relegation to Verbandsliga
17	1. FC Schwalmstadt (R)	32	1	3	28	17	96	−79	6	Relegation to Verbandsliga

Source: soccerway.com
Rules for classification: 1) Points; 2) Goal difference; 3) Goals scored; 4) head-to-head results; 5) goals scored away from home against opponent; 6) goals scored away from home; 7) drawing of lots
(C) Champions; (P) Promoted; (R) Relegated

=== Top goalscorers ===
The top goal scorers for the season:

Rank	Player	Club	Goals
1	(Germany) Peter Sprung	Sportfreunde Seligenstadt	27
2	(Morocco) Younes Bahssou	SV Wiesbaden	24
3	(Germany) Dominik Rummel	TSV Lehnerz	20

== Promotion play-offs ==
Promotion play-offs were held at the end of the season for both the Regionalliga above and the Hessenliga.

=== To the Regionalliga ===
The runners-up of the Hessenliga, Oberliga Rheinland-Pfalz/Saar and the Oberliga Baden-Württemberg, TSV Lehnerz, SC Hauenstein and Bahlinger SC, competed for one more spot in the Regionalliga. While the first game had been scheduled the second and third depended on the outcome of the first. Bahlinger SC won promotion to the Regionalliga courtesy to a win and a draw.

27 May 2015	TSV Lehnerz	1–1	SC Hauenstein	Stadion Richard-Müller-Straße, Fulda-Lehnerz
19:00	Mistretta 46'	Report	Zimmermann 68'	Attendance: 4,000; Referee: Tobias Fritsch

31 May 2015	Bahlinger SC	0–0	TSV Lehnerz	Kaiserstuhlstadion, Bahlingen
14:00		Report		Attendance: 4,250; Referee: Timo Klein

4 June 2015	SC Hauenstein	0–3	Bahlinger SC	Am Neding, Hauenstein
14:00		Report	Sautner 2', 40' (pen.); Fellanxa 90'	Attendance: 2,500; Referee: Moritz Kühlmeyer

=== To the Hessenliga ===
The runners-up of the Verbandsliga Nord (Hünfelder SV), Verbandsliga Süd (Rot-Weiss Frankfurt) and Verbandsliga Mitte (Viktoria Kelsterbach) competed for one more spot in the Hessenliga with Rot-Weiss Frankfurt winning promotion.

4 June 2015	Viktoria Kelsterbach	2–1	Hünfelder SV
16:00		Report

7 June 2015	Hünfelder SV	1–5	Rot-Weiss Frankfurt
15:00		Report

11 June 2015	Rot-Weiss Frankfurt	0–0	Viktoria Kelsterbach
19:30		Report
