= 2013–14 Hessenliga =

- Season: 2013–14
- Champions: TGM SV Jügesheim
- Promoted: none
- Relegated: TGM SV Jügesheim; FSV Frankfurt II; FSV Fernwald; Kickers Offenbach II; Hünfelder SV
- Matches: 342
- Top goalscorer: Steffen Moritz (32 goals)
- Total attendance: 75,352
- Average attendance: 220
- All statistics correct as of 17 December 2015.

The 2013–14 season of the Hessenliga, the highest association football league in the German state of Hesse, was the sixth season of the league at tier five (V) of the German football league system and the 36th season overall since establishment of the league in 1978, then as the Oberliga Hessen.

The season started on 26 July 2013 and finished on 24 May 2014.

No team was promoted from the Hessenliga to the Regionalliga Südwest above as 2013–14 champions TGM SV Jügesheim decided to withdraw from the league while 1. FC Eschborn, the only team to have applied for a Regionalliga licence, later withdrew this application.

== Final standings ==
The 2013–14 season saw seven new clubs in the league, FC Ederbergland, SV Wiesbaden, TSV Lehnerz and Sportfreunde Seligenstadt, all promoted from the Verbandsligas while FC Bayern Alzenau, 1. FC Eschborn and FSV Frankfurt II had been relegated from the Regionalliga Südwest.

Pos	Team	Pld	W	D	L	GF	GA	GD	Pts	Promotion, qualification or relegation
1	TGM SV Jügesheim (Note: TGM SV Jügesheim withdrawn to the tier seven Gruppenliga Frankfurt-Ost at the end of the 2013–14 season.) (C, R)	36	21	8	7	70	38	+32	71	Withdrawn
2	OSC Vellmar	36	19	7	10	79	57	+22	64	
3	1. FC Eschborn	36	17	9	10	68	51	+17	60	
4	TSV Lehnerz	36	15	12	9	62	47	+15	57	
5	FSV Frankfurt II (Note: FSV Frankfurt II withdrawn from competition at the end of the 2013–14 season.) (R)	36	15	11	10	86	61	+25	56	Withdrawn
6	Rot-Weiß Hadamar	36	15	10	11	64	47	+17	55	
7	SV Wehen Wiesbaden II	36	15	9	12	62	60	+2	54	
8	Sportfreunde Seligenstadt	36	14	11	11	60	55	+5	53	
9	SV Wiesbaden	36	13	11	12	68	62	+6	50	
10	FSV Fernwald (Note: FSV Fernwald withdrawn to the tier eight Kreisoberliga Gießen at the end of the 2013–14 season.) (R)	36	13	9	14	53	58	−5	48	Withdrawn
11	Eintracht Stadtallendorf	36	12	11	13	52	66	−14	47	
12	FSC Lohfelden	36	12	10	14	58	72	−14	46	
13	Rot-Weiß Darmstadt	36	13	6	17	56	64	−8	45	
14	FC Bayern Alzenau	36	11	12	13	47	54	−7	44 (Note: FC Bayern Alzenau deducted one point for non-compliance with league requirements.)	
15	Buchonia Flieden	36	11	9	16	74	81	−7	42	
16	Viktoria Griesheim	36	10	12	14	52	65	−13	42	
17	FC Ederbergland	36	12	4	20	57	81	−24	40	
18	Kickers Offenbach II (R)	36	9	8	19	52	70	−18	35	Relegation to Verbandsliga
19	Hünfelder SV (R)	36	7	7	22	51	82	−31	28	Relegation to Verbandsliga

Source: soccerway.com
Rules for classification: 1) Points; 2) Goal difference; 3) Goals scored; 4) head-to-head results; 5) goals scored away from home against opponent; 6) goals scored away from home; 7) drawing of lots
(C) Champions; (R) Relegated

=== Top goalscorers ===
The top goal scorers for the season:

Rank	Player	Club	Goals
1	(Germany) Steffen Moritz	Rot-Weiß Hadamar	32
2	(Germany) Fabian Schaub	Buchonia Flieden	30
3	(Germany) Rene Huneck	FSC Lohfelden	22

== Promotion play-offs ==
Promotion play-offs were held at the end of the season for the Regionalliga.

=== To the Regionalliga ===
The runners-up of the Hessenliga, Oberliga Rheinland-Pfalz/Saar and the Oberliga Baden-Württemberg were scheduled to play each other for one more spot in the Regionalliga. The Hessenliga runners-up declined this opportunity leaving just two teams to play off, with FC Nöttingen winning promotion to the Regionalliga:

29 May 2014	FC Nöttingen	0−0	FSV Salmrohr	Panoramastadion, Nöttingen
18:00		Report		Attendance: 1,400; Referee: Christof Günsch

1 June 2014	FSV Salmrohr	0−1	FC Nöttingen	Salmtalstadion, Salmrohr
16:00		Report	Schürg 78'	Attendance: 2,800; Referee: Kai Vonderschmidt
