= 2015–16 Hessenliga =

- Season: 2015–16
- Champions: Teutonia Watzenborn
- Promoted: Teutonia Watzenborn
- Relegated: 1. FC Eschborn; SV Wiesbaden; Spvgg 05 Oberrad; SV Buchonia Flieden
- Matches: 272
- Top goalscorer: Raffael Szymanski (26 goals)
- Highest attendance: 7,200
- Lowest attendance: 50
- Total attendance: 93,131
- Average attendance: 342

The 2015–16 season of the Hessenliga, the highest football league in the German state of Hesse, marked its eighth season at tier five (V) of the German football league system and the 38th season overall since establishment of the league in 1978, then as the Oberliga Hessen.

The season began on 24 July 2015 and finished on 21 May 2016, with a winter break between 12 December and 20 February.

== Standings ==
The 2015–16 season saw five new clubs in the league, Borussia Fulda, Teutonia Watzenborn-Steinberg, SC Hessen Dreieich and Rot-Weiss Frankfurt, all four promoted from the Verbandsligas, while KSV Baunatal was relegated from the Regionalliga Südwest.

Pos	Team	Pld	W	D	L	GF	GA	GD	Pts	Promotion, qualification or relegation
1	Teutonia Watzenborn (C, P)	32	20	8	4	81	40	+41	68	Promotion to Regionalliga Südwest
2	Rot-Weiss Frankfurt (Q)	32	20	4	8	81	45	+36	64	Qualification to promotion playoffs
3	TSV Lehnerz (Note: TSV Eintracht Stadtallendorf 0–3 loss to TSV Lehnerz was awarded 3–0 to Stadtallendorf but later changed back to a win for Lehnerz.)	32	16	9	7	59	38	+21	57	
4	FSC Lohfelden	32	17	6	9	62	49	+13	57	
5	TSV Eintracht Stadtallendorf	32	17	3	12	63	55	+8	54	
6	1. FC Eschborn (Note: 1. FC Eschborn withdrawn to the Gruppenliga for the following season for financial reasons.) (X)	32	14	7	11	55	54	+1	49	Withdrawn to Gruppenliga
7	SV Wiesbaden (Note: SV Wiesbaden withdrawn to the Gruppenliga for the following season for financial reasons.) (X)	32	14	6	12	57	46	+11	48	Withdrawn to Gruppenliga
8	SC Viktoria Griesheim	32	12	6	14	49	55	−6	42	
9	Sportfreunde Seligenstadt	32	12	6	14	50	57	−7	42	
10	SV Rot-Weiß Hadamar	32	11	8	13	50	62	−12	41	
11	Borussia Fulda	32	11	6	15	36	51	−15	39	
12	KSV Baunatal	32	12	3	17	63	64	−1	39	
13	SC Hessen Dreieich	32	10	8	14	54	60	−6	38	
14	OSC Vellmar	32	10	5	17	54	69	−15	35	
15	FC Bayern Alzenau	32	10	4	18	43	60	−17	34	
16	Spvgg 05 Oberrad (R)	32	7	10	15	36	58	−22	31	Relegation to Verbandsliga
17	SV Buchonia Flieden (R)	32	8	3	21	42	72	−30	27	Relegation to Verbandsliga

Source: kicker.de soccerway.com
Rules for classification: 1) Points; 2) Goal difference; 3) Goals scored; 4) head-to-head results; 5) goals scored away from home against opponent; 6) goals scored away from home; 7) drawing of lots
(C) Champions; (P) Promoted; (Q) Qualified for the phase indicated; (R) Relegated; (X) Team withdrew

=== Top goalscorers ===
The top goal scorers for the season:<

Rank	Player	Club	Goals
1	(Germany) Raffael Szymanski	Teutonia Watzenborn	26
2	(Germany) Varol Akgöz	Rot-Weiss Frankfurt	24
3	(Morocco) Younes Bahssou	SV Wiesbaden	21
3	(Germany) Denis Weinecker	Teutonia Watzenborn	21
5	(Turkey) Serdar Bayrak	FSC Lohfelden	19
5	(Turkey) Cem Kara	Rot-Weiss Frankfurt	19

== Promotion play-off ==
Promotion play-off will be held at the end of the season for both the Regionalliga above and the Oberliga.

=== To the Regionalliga ===
The runners-up of the Hessenliga, Oberliga Baden-Württemberg and Oberliga Rheinland-Pfalz/Saar competed for one more spot in the Regionalliga Südwest, with each team playing the other just once:

Pos	Team	Pld	W	D	L	GF	GA	GD	Pts	Promotion	FCN	RWF	SCH
1	FC Nöttingen (P)	2	1	1	0	7	6	+1	4	Promotion to Regionalliga Südwest	—	3–2	—
2	Rot-Weiss Frankfurt	2	1	0	1	5	5	0	3		—	—	3–2
3	SC Hauenstein	2	0	1	1	6	7	−1	1		4–4	—	—

Source: Weltfussball.de
Rules for classification: 1) Points; 2) Head-to-head; 3) Decider;
(P) Promoted

=== To the Oberliga ===
The runners-up of the Verbandsliga Hessen-Nord, Verbandsliga Hessen-Süd and Verbandsliga Hessen-Mitte compete for two more spots in the Oberliga which FC Ederbergland and Rot-Weiß Darmstadt won.

Team 1	Score	Team 2
Rot-Weiß Darmstadt	3–0	1. FC Schwalmstadt
FC Ederbergland	2–0	Rot-Weiß Darmstadt
1. FC Schwalmstadt	1–1	FC Ederbergland
