= 2008–09 Hessenliga =

Hessenliga
- Season: 2008–09
- Champions: SC Waldgirmes
- Promoted: FC Bayern Alzenau
- Relegated: SV Buchonia Flieden, Borussia Fulda, KSV Hessen Kassel II, FSC Lohfelden
- Matches played: 342
- Goals scored: 1,086 (3.18 per match)
- Biggest home win: FC Viktoria 09 Urberach 7–1 SV Buchonia Flieden
- Biggest away win: KSV Hessen Kassel II 0–7 SC Waldgirmes
- Highest scoring: FC Viktoria 09 Urberach 7–3 KSV Baunatal

The 2008–09 season of the Hessenliga was the first season of the league at tier five (V) of the German football league system after the introduction of the 3. Fußball-Liga.

SC Waldgirmes, champions of the Hessenliga, did not meet the licensing criteria for the Fußball-Regionalliga. In their place, the Bavarian team FC Bayern Alzenau were promoted to the 2009–10 Regionalliga Süd. SV Buchonia Flieden, Borussia Fulda, KSV Hessen Kassel II and FSC Lohfelden were relegated to their respective Verbandsligen.

1. FC Schwalmstadt and SVA Bad Hersfeld from the Verbandsliga Hessen-Nord, VfB Marburg from the Verbandsliga Hessen-Mitte and FSV Frankfurt II from the Verbandsliga Hessen-Süd were promoted to the 2009–10 Hessenliga. Joining them in the Hessenliga next season are Viktoria Aschaffenburg, having been relegated from the Regionalliga.

Location of teams in the 2008–09 Hessenliga

== League table ==
Pos	Team	Pld	W	D	L	GF	GA	GD	Pts	Promotion or relegation
1	SC Waldgirmes (C)	36	23	6	7	85	45	+40	75	Ineligible for promotion (Note: SC Waldgirmes did not meet the licensing criteria for the Regionalliga. FC Bayern Alzenau were promoted in their place.)
2	FC Bayern Alzenau (Note: FC Bayern Alzenau, Rot-Weiss Frankfurt, RSV Würges and FSC Lohfelden were docked 1 point for not fulfilling league requirements.) (P)	36	21	6	9	75	46	+29	68	Promotion to Regionalliga Süd
3	FC Viktoria 09 Urberach	36	19	6	11	76	50	+26	63	
4	Kickers Offenbach II	36	15	12	9	68	52	+16	57	
5	KSV Baunatal	36	16	6	14	77	62	+15	54	
6	1. FC Eschborn	36	15	9	12	58	45	+13	54	
7	KSV Klein-Karben	36	13	12	11	66	60	+6	51	
8	TSV Eintracht Stadtallendorf	36	13	12	11	56	52	+4	51	
9	OSC Vellmar	36	14	9	13	53	58	−5	51	
10	Hünfelder SV	36	13	10	13	66	61	+5	49	
11	Rot-Weiss Frankfurt	36	12	13	11	57	58	−1	48	
12	FSV 1926 Fernwald	36	11	13	12	53	49	+4	46	
13	TSG Wörsdorf	36	11	13	12	37	36	+1	46	
14	RSV Würges	36	11	13	12	49	45	+4	45	
15	1. FC Germania 08 Ober-Roden	36	11	10	15	47	51	−4	43	
16	SV Buchonia Flieden (R)	36	10	9	17	54	80	−26	39	Relegation to Verbandsliga
17	Borussia Fulda (R)	36	8	11	17	39	60	−21	35	Relegation to Verbandsliga
18	KSV Hessen Kassel II (R)	36	8	9	19	39	85	−46	33	Relegation to Verbandsliga
19	FSC Lohfelden (R)	36	7	3	26	31	91	−60	23	Relegation to Verbandsliga

Source: fussballdaten.de
Rules for classification: 1) points; 2) goal difference; 3) number of goals scored.
(C) Champions; (P) Promoted; (R) Relegated
