= Reasat Islam Khaton =

Bangladeshi association football player

Reasat Khaton
Personal information
- Full name: Reasat Islam Khaton
- Date of birth: 1 August 1989 (age 37)
- Place of birth: Dhaka, Bangladesh
- Height: 1.80 m (5 ft 11 in)
- Position: Midfielder

Youth career
- 1996–2004: Freiburger
- 2004–2008: SC Freiburg

Senior career*
Years	Team	Apps	(Gls)
2008–2009	KSV Hessen Kassel II		
2009	FSC Lohfelden	20	(8)
2009–2010	1. Schwalmstadt	14	(3)
2010	SC Wiedenbrück 2000		
2010–2011	VfB Marburg		
2011–2012	FSC Lohfelden		
2012	Chemnitzer		
2012–2013	BV Cloppenburg		
2014	SV Seligenporten		
2014–2015	Pachanga Diliman	8	(0)
2015–2016	SV Kaufungen 07		
2016–2017	Carrick Rangers		
2017–2018	Carmarthen Town		
2018–2019	Llanelli Town	10	(0)
2021–2022	KF Shkumbini	3	(0)
2022–2023	Deportivo Rayo Zuliano	1	(0)
2024	SSV Sand		
- * Club domestic league appearances and goals as of 7 August 2022

Reasat Islam Khaton (Bengali: রিয়াসাত ইসলাম খাতন) is a Bangladeshi footballer who plays as a midfielder.
He is the first Bangladeshi to play a competitive match for the first team of a top-division European club. He is also the first Bangladeshi footballer to play professional football in South America.

== Club career ==
Reasat's family moved to Germany when he was five and he started playing football the following year with Freiburger FC.
When he was 14, he joined the youth team of Bundesliga side SC Freiburg. Reasat featured for SC Freiburg's U-19 side before playing for KSV Hessen Kassel II's U-23 team where he played around 23 games for them.

During 2008–2014, he played for several clubs from fourth & fifth tier of German football respectively. Notably, he spent his best times with FSC Lohfelden scoring 8 goals in 20 matches. After that he scored 3 goals in 14 matches for 1. FC Schwalmstadt during league games & 4 goals in 3 matches in cup games.

After playing in the German pyramid at various clubs, Reasat was signed by Filipino top-tier side Pachanga Diliman F.C. On 20 June 2015, finally, Reasat made his top tier debut of his career against Green Archers United F.C.

In January 2017, he was signed by Northern Irish second-tier side Carrick Rangers F.C. but could not play because of injury. He was also released by Welsh side Carmarthen Town A.F.C. before playing due to injury.

On 9 July 2018, Reasat was signed by newly promoted Welsh Premier League side Llanelli Town A.F.C.
Reasat made his European top-tier debut on 18 August 2018, in a 3–2 win against Cefn Druids A.F.C. in the league game of Welsh Premier League, coming on as a 90th-minute substitute for Jordan Follows. By playing this match, he also became the first Bangladesh-born to feature in a top-division European club.

In 2022, Reasat was signed by Albanian First Division side KF Shkumbini. On 9 April 2022, Reasat made his Kategoria e Parë debut against KF Turbina in matchweek 26, coming on as a substitute for Mishel Hasbajrami. The same year, he signed for Venezuelan club Deportivo Rayo Zuliano and made his Liga FUTVE 2 debut for the club in a 4 – 4 draw against Titanes F.C.

== International career ==
In July 2013, Reasat Khaton first arrived in Bangladesh for a trial for a place in the Bangladesh national football team as Dutch coach Lodewijk de Kruif was looking for Bangladeshi expatriate booters to boost his squad for the 2013 SAFF Championship. However, he was not selected for the main squad of the national team for that edition of SAFF Championship.

In May 2015, Reasat was called up again for national duties against both Singapore & Afghanistan by head coach Lodewijk de Kruif. Although he remained in bench for both matches and yet to make his international debut.
