= 2009–10 Hessenliga =

Hessenliga
- Season: 2009–10
- Champions: FSV Frankfurt II
- Promoted: FSV Frankfurt II
- Relegated: KSV Klein-Karben, 1. FC Germania 08 Ober-Roden, TSG Wörsdorf, SVA Bad Hersfeld, Viktoria Aschaffenburg^{1}
- Matches played: 342
- Goals scored: 1,217 (3.56 per match)
- Top goalscorer: Steffen Moritz – 25 (RSV Würges)
- Biggest home win: FSV Frankfurt II 8–1 SVA Bad Hersfeld; Rot-Weiss Frankfurt 7–0 SVA Bad Hersfeld
- Biggest away win: SVA Bad Hersfeld 0–7 FSV Frankfurt II
- Highest scoring: 1. FC Eschborn 8–4 SVA Bad Hersfeld
- Average attendance: 207

The 2009–10 season of the Hessenliga was the second season of the league at tier five (V) of the German football league system.

FSV Frankfurt II, champions of the Hessenliga, were promoted to the 2010–11 Regionalliga Süd. KSV Klein-Karben, 1. FC Germania 08 Ober-Roden, TSG Wörsdorf and SVA Bad Hersfeld were relegated to their respective Verbandsligen, whilst Viktoria Aschaffenburg had to withdraw from the Hessenliga after the end of the season as a result of going into administration. Due to their withdrawal, OSC Vellmar were allowed to stay in the league despite having lost in the relegation playoff round in which 1. FCA Darmstadt earned their Hessenliga place for the 2010–11 season. The winners of the 2009–10 Verbandsliga Hessen-Nord, VfB Süsterfeld, also went into administration, thus SV Buchonia Flieden will take their place in the 2010–11 Hessenliga. Eintracht Wetzlar won the 2009–10 Verbandsliga Hessen-Mitte and are promoted, as are the champions of the 2009–10 Verbandsliga Hessen-Süd, Rot-Weiß Darmstadt. Joining them in the Hessenliga are FC Bayern Alzenau, having been relegated from the Regionalliga.

Location of teams in the 2009–10 Hessenliga

== League table ==
Pos	Team	Pld	W	D	L	GF	GA	GD	Pts	Promotion, qualification or relegation
1	FSV Frankfurt II (C, P)	36	24	8	4	95	34	+61	80	Promotion to Regionalliga Süd
2	SC Waldgirmes	36	18	13	5	81	56	+25	67	
3	KSV Baunatal	36	20	6	10	76	50	+26	66	
4	TSV Eintracht Stadtallendorf	36	16	10	10	58	44	+14	58	
5	Rot-Weiss Frankfurt	36	15	12	9	67	53	+14	57	
6	1. FC Eschborn	36	16	8	12	78	65	+13	56	
7	Hünfelder SV	36	16	8	12	58	47	+11	56	
8	Viktoria Aschaffenburg (R)	36	15	10	11	55	49	+6	55 (Note: Viktoria Aschaffenburg went into administration at the end of the season and thus had to withdraw from the Hessenliga.)	Relegation to Verbandsliga
9	Kickers Offenbach II	36	17	4	15	69	64	+5	55	
10	RSV Würges	36	14	12	10	63	49	+14	53 (Note: RSV Würges were docked 1 point for not fulfilling league requirements.)	
11	FC Viktoria 09 Urberach	36	14	10	12	67	63	+4	52	
12	VfB Marburg	36	14	7	15	65	68	−3	49	
13	FSV 1926 Fernwald	36	13	7	16	61	65	−4	46	
14	1. FC Schwalmstadt	36	11	8	17	58	70	−12	41	
15	OSC Vellmar	36	11	7	18	55	76	−21	40	Qualification to relegation playoffs
16	KSV Klein-Karben (R)	36	11	6	19	67	81	−14	39	Relegation to Verbandsliga
17	1. FC Germania 08 Ober-Roden (R)	36	10	6	20	50	72	−22	36	Relegation to Verbandsliga
18	TSG Wörsdorf (R)	36	7	6	23	47	84	−37	27	Relegation to Verbandsliga
19	SVA Bad Hersfeld (R)	36	4	4	28	47	127	−80	16	Relegation to Verbandsliga

Source: fussballdaten.de
Rules for classification: 1) points; 2) goal difference; 3) number of goals scored.
(C) Champions; (P) Promoted; (R) Relegated
