= Serdar Bayrak =

Turkish footballer

Personal information
- Date of birth: 27 August 1985 (age 41)
- Place of birth: Kassel, Germany
- Height: 1.79 m (5 ft 10 in)
- Position: Midfielder

Team information
- Current team: TSV Rothwesten II

Youth career
- KSV Baunatal
- TSV Wolfsanger

Senior career*
Years	Team	Apps	(Gls)
–2005	VfB Süsterfeld		
2005–2006	TSG Wattenbach	10	(3)
2006–2007	SC Paderborn 07	2	(0)
2007–2008	KSV Hessen Kassel	22	(2)
2008–2009	FC Erzgebirge Aue	1	(0)
2009	Çorumspor		
2009–2010	Fethiyespor		
2010	Çorumspor		
2010–2011	VfB Süsterfeld		
2011	İnegölspor		
2012–2015	SSV Sand	73	(22)
2015–2018	FSC Lohfelden	79	(30)
2020–2021	Lichtenauer FV	2	(0)
2022–	TSV Rothwesten II		
- * Club domestic league appearances and goals as of 25 October 2020

Serdar Bayrak (born 27 August 1985) is a Turkish footballer who plays for German amateur side TSV Rothwesten II.
