= 2010–11 Hessenliga =

Hessenliga
- Season: 2010–11
- Champions: FC Bayern Alzenau
- Promoted: FC Bayern Alzenau
- Relegated: Hünfelder SV, 1. FC Schwalmstadt, VfB Marburg, RSV Würges

The 2010–11 season of the Hessenliga was the third season of the league at tier five (V) of the German football league system.

Although the teams from the German state of Hesse made up the bulk of the clubs in the Hessenliga, the Bavarian side FC Bayern Alzenau played the 2010–11 season in the division as they are members of the Hessischer Fußball-Verband (HFV; Hessian Football Association). As league champions, they were directly promoted to the 2011–12 Regionalliga Süd. The three worst placed teams, Hünfelder SV, 1. FC Schwalmstadt and VfB Marburg, were relegated to their respective Verbandsligen and the 15th placed team, RSV Würges, lost in the playoffs to the runners-up of the three Verbandsligen and thus were also relegated.

Location of teams in the 2010–11 Hessenliga

== League table ==
Pos	Team	Pld	W	D	L	GF	GA	GD	Pts	Promotion, qualification or relegation
1	FC Bayern Alzenau (C, P)	34	19	9	6	77	35	+42	66	Promotion to Regionalliga Süd
2	SC Waldgirmes	34	17	7	10	76	56	+20	58	
3	KSV Baunatal	34	17	7	10	75	56	+19	58	
4	1. FC Eschborn	34	17	6	11	78	58	+20	57	
5	Kickers Offenbach II	34	17	3	14	71	60	+11	54	
6	OSC Vellmar (Note: OSC Vellmar and 1. FCA Darmstadt were docked 2 points for not fulfilling league requirements.)	34	17	4	13	76	65	+11	53	
7	FC Viktoria 09 Urberach	34	16	5	13	60	51	+9	53	
8	TSV Eintracht Stadtallendorf	34	16	5	13	65	65	0	53	
9	FSV 1926 Fernwald	34	13	11	10	53	49	+4	50	
10	Eintracht Wetzlar	34	12	11	11	55	58	−3	47	
11	1. FCA Darmstadt	34	13	8	13	51	49	+2	45	
12	Rot-Weiß Darmstadt	34	12	9	13	50	48	+2	45	
13	SV Buchonia Flieden	34	13	6	15	70	71	−1	45	
14	Rot-Weiss Frankfurt	34	12	6	16	56	62	−6	42	
15	RSV Würges (R)	34	12	6	16	44	58	−14	42	Qualification to relegation playoffs
16	Hünfelder SV (R)	34	8	8	18	44	61	−17	32	Relegation to Verbandsliga
17	1. FC Schwalmstadt (R)	34	8	7	19	36	76	−40	31	Relegation to Verbandsliga
18	VfB Marburg (R)	34	5	6	23	31	90	−59	21	Relegation to Verbandsliga

Source: fussballdaten.de
Rules for classification: 1) points; 2) goal difference; 3) number of goals scored.
(C) Champions; (P) Promoted; (R) Relegated

== Play-offs ==
The table of the promotion round, which was contested between the three Verbandsliga runners-up and the 15th placed Hessenliga team to determine one further spot in the Hessenliga for the following season:

Pos	Team	Pld	W	D	L	GF	GA	GD	Pts	Promotion or relegation
1	Viktoria Aschaffenburg (P)	3	2	0	1	11	5	+6	6	Promotion to Hessenliga
2	RSV Würges (R)	3	2	0	1	10	6	+4	6	Relegation to Verbandsliga
3	KSV Hessen Kassel II (R)	3	2	0	1	7	6	+1	6	Relegation to Verbandsliga
4	VfB Gießen (R)	3	0	0	3	3	14	−11	0	Relegation to Verbandsliga

Source: fussball.de
Rules for classification: 1) points; 2) goal difference; 3) number of goals scored.
(P) Promoted; (R) Relegated
