= Thomas Freudenstein =

German footballer

Personal information
- Date of birth: 28 April 1962
- Place of birth: Gudensberg, Germany
- Height: 1.78 m (5 ft 10 in)
- Position: Midfielder

Senior career*
| Years | Team | Apps | (Gls) |
| 1980–1983 | KSV Hessen Kassel II | | |
| 1983–1987 | KSV Hessen Kassel | | |
| 1987–1989 | Hertha BSC | | |
| 1989–2001 | KSV Hessen Kassel | | |

Managerial career
- 2003–2004: KSV Hessen Kassel
- * Club domestic league appearances and goals

Thomas Freudenstein (born 28 April 1962) is a German former footballer who played as a midfielder.
