= 2011–12 Hessenliga =

Hessenliga
- Season: 2011–12
- Champions: 1. FC Eschborn
- Promoted: 1. FC Eschborn, Viktoria Aschaffenburg
- Relegated: Rot-Weiss Frankfurt, Eintracht Wetzlar
- Top goalscorer: René Huneck – 27 (FSC Lohfelden)

The 2011–12 season of the Hessenliga was the fourth season of the league at tier five (V) of the German football league system.

The champions, 1. FC Eschborn, were promoted to the 2012–13 Regionalliga Südwest. Viktoria Aschaffenburg exchanged their membership of the Hessischer Fußball-Verband (HFV; Hessian Football Association) for the Bavarian Football Association and were promoted one tier to the newly established Fußball-Regionalliga Bayern. Rot-Weiss Frankfurt and Eintracht Wetzlar were relegated to their respective Verbandsligen. 1. FCA Darmstadt took on the runners-up of the Verbandsligen Nord (TSV Lehnerz), Mitte (FC 1931 Eddersheim) and Süd (Kickers Obertshausen), finished first in the group, and thus secured their place in the 2012–13 Hessenliga along with second-placed FC 1931 Eddersheim.

== League table ==
Pos	Team	Pld	W	D	L	GF	GA	GD	Pts	Promotion, qualification or relegation
1	1. FC Eschborn (C, P)	34	24	5	5	77	35	+42	77	Promotion to Regionalliga Südwest
2	KSV Baunatal	34	21	7	6	82	48	+34	70	
3	FSV 1926 Fernwald	34	18	10	6	58	30	+28	64	
4	Viktoria Aschaffenburg (P)	34	16	8	10	67	55	+12	56	Promotion to Regionalliga Bayern (Note: Viktoria Aschaffenburg decided to take up this option in November 2011, voting to join the Bavarian Football Association from the 2012–13 season. Playing in the Hessenliga, the club, since they finished in the top nine, automatically qualify for the Regionalliga Bayern. If they had finished tenth or lower, they would have been grouped in the Bayernliga Nord.)
5	FC Viktoria 09 Urberach	34	15	9	10	67	45	+22	54	
6	SV Wehen Wiesbaden II	34	15	6	13	61	55	+6	51	
7	OSC Vellmar	34	15	6	13	60	62	−2	51	
8	Rot-Weiß Darmstadt	34	15	4	15	64	59	+5	49	
9	FSC Lohfelden	34	15	3	16	68	63	+5	48	
10	TGM SV Jügesheim	34	12	11	11	47	41	+6	47	
11	SV Buchonia Flieden	34	15	2	17	64	69	−5	47	
12	Kickers Offenbach II	34	13	6	15	66	63	+3	45	
13	SpVgg Hadamar	34	10	8	16	49	62	−13	38	
14	SC Waldgirmes	34	10	8	16	54	72	−18	38	
15	TSV Eintracht Stadtallendorf	34	10	7	17	49	68	−19	37	
16	1. FCA Darmstadt (O)	34	8	8	18	50	65	−15	32	Qualification to relegation playoffs
17	Rot-Weiss Frankfurt (R)	34	8	6	20	37	86	−49	30	Relegation to Verbandsliga
18	Eintracht Wetzlar (R)	34	6	6	22	44	86	−42	24	Relegation to Verbandsliga

Source: fussballdaten.de
Rules for classification: 1) points; 2) goal difference; 3) number of goals scored.
(C) Champions; (O) Play-off winners; (P) Promoted; (R) Relegated
