= Stadion in der Witz =

Stadium in Mainz-Kastel, Wiesbaden, Germany

Coordinates: 50°0′32″N 8°17′26″E

The Stadion in der Witz is a stadium in Mainz-Kastel, Wiesbaden, Germany, with a capacity of 5,000. It is currently used for football matches and is the home ground of FVgg Kastel 06.
