= 1. Rödelheimer FC 02 =

German football club

- Full name: 1. Rödelheimer Fussball-Club 02 e.V.
- Founded: 12 April 1902
- Ground: Sportanlage an der Westerbach
- Chairman: Veljko Vuksanovic
- Manager: Günther Fromm
- League: Kreisoberliga Frankfurt (VIII)
- 2015–16: 14th
Home colours	Away colours

The 1. Rödelheimer FC is a German association football club from the Rödelheim district in the city of Frankfurt am Main, Hesse.

== History ==
The 1. RFC was formed as a football club on 12 April 1902 by twelve football enthusiasts in a local pub, the Zum Taunus. The club went through several name changes to eventually revert to its original name after the Second World War.

For most of its history, the club did not rise above the local level and stood in the shadow of Frankfurt's bigger clubs, Eintracht and FSV. It played for one season in the tier-one Kreisliga Nordmain in 1921–22. In 1943, the club, then under the name of VfL Rödelheim, won promotion to the tier-one Gauliga Südwest/Mainhessen.

The club's biggest success to date came in 1948, when it managed to win the Landesliga Hessen, then the second tier of the league system in Southern Germany. The team was promoted to the Oberliga Süd, the highest level of play, where it lasted for only one season, finishing last, before being relegated again, back to the Landesliga. While the low point of the season came with a 0–10 defeat to Kickers Offenbach, another local rival, its last Oberliga game was a 4–1 triumph over 1. FC Nürnberg, in front of 8,000 spectators. All four goals were scored by Hubert Schieth. Another player of the Oberliga team that season was Alfred Pfaff, who would later, as an Eintracht Frankfurt player, be part of the German team that won the 1954 FIFA World Cup.

The club soon found itself back to the lower ranks of football, being relegated from what was now the Amateurliga Hessen in 1951. It did not reappear in any of the top-four divisions of German football after 1963.

In 2007–08, a second-place finish in the Bezirksliga Frankfurt (VII) meant, the club was promoted to what was now the Gruppenliga Frankfurt-West, formerly Bezirksoberliga Frankfurt-West. It held this league level for two seasons but was relegated again in 2010 into what had now become the Kreisoberliga (VIII), where it plays today.

== Honours ==
The club's honours:

- Landesliga Hessen (II)
  - Champions: 1947, 1948

== Recent seasons ==
The recent season-by-season performance of the club:

Season	Division	Tier	Position
2003–04	Bezirksliga Frankfurt	VII	11th
2004–05	Bezirksliga Frankfurt	VII	13th
2005–06	Bezirksliga Frankfurt	VII	6th
2006–07	Bezirksliga Frankfurt	VII	4th
2007–08	Bezirksliga Frankfurt	VII	2nd ↑
2008–09	Gruppenliga Frankfurt-West	VII	9th
2009–10	Gruppenliga Frankfurt-West	VII	14th ↓
2010–11	Kreisoberliga Frankfurt	VIII	7th
2011–12	Kreisoberliga Frankfurt	VIII	13th
2012–13	Kreisoberliga Frankfurt	VIII	14th
2013–14	Kreisoberliga Frankfurt	VIII	9th
2014–15	Kreisoberliga Frankfurt	VIII	7th
2015–16	Kreisoberliga Frankfurt	VIII	14th
2016–17	Kreisoberliga Frankfurt	VIII	

- With the introduction of the Regionalligas in 1994 and the 3. Liga in 2008 as the new third tier, below the 2. Bundesliga, all leagues below dropped one tier. Also in 2008, a large number of football leagues in Hesse were renamed, with the Oberliga Hessen becoming the Hessenliga, the Landesliga becoming the Verbandsliga, the Bezirksoberliga becoming the Gruppenliga and the Bezirksliga becoming the Kreisoberliga.

↑ Promoted	↓ Relegated
