= FVgg Kastel 06 =

German football club

- Full name: Kasteler Fußballvereinigung 06 e. V.
- Nickname(s): KFV
- Founded: 1906
- Ground: Stadion in der Witz
- Capacity: 5,000
- Chairman: Michael Länge
- Manager: Dieter Feldmann & Jürgen Danielewski
- League: Kreisoberliga Wiesbaden (VIII)
- 2015–16: 3rd
Home colours	Away colours

FVgg Kastel 06 is a German association football club based in the Mainz-Kastel district of Wiesbaden, Hesse. The club was formed through the August 1907 merger of Kasteler FC, Kasteler FC Germania, and Borussia Kastel each established in 1906. In 1909 Borussia again went its way as a separate club.

== History ==
FVgg won local honours in 1912 and finished runners-up in the Kreisliga Hessen (I) in 1922. After a Kreisliga (II) championship in 1924, they advanced to the Bezirksliga Main-Hessen (I) in 1931 where they played two seasons. In 1933, German football was reorganized under the Third Reich into 16 first division Gauligen. Despite finishing second in their group, the Kasteler side failed to qualify for the new competition, and they slipped into lower-tier play. In 1934, they merged with Turngemeinshaft 1886 Kastel to create TuRa 1886 Kastel and a year later Borussia rejoined the association. In February 1939, TuRa was joined with Turnverein 1848 Kastel to become TSG 1846 Kastel.

Following World War II, most organizations in the country – including sports and football associations – were ordered dissolved by occupying Allied authorities. Most clubs were soon rebuilt and in 1946 FVgg and TV 1848 reappeared as independent sides.

FVgg remained a lower-tier club making single-season cameo appearances in the Amateurliga Hessen (III) in 1963–64 and 1974–75 after winning titles in the Landesliga Hessen (IV). The club remained a Landesliga side until again capturing the title in 1979. Kastel was promoted to the Amateuroberliga Hessen (III) where they spent the next four seasons. The team struggled on its return to the Landesliga, but won the regional cup competition and made an appearance in the opening round of the DFB-Pokal (German Cup) in 1982. FVgg had a brush with bankruptcy in 1984 and were relegated to lower level play. By 2000 they were in the Bezirksoberliga Wiesbaden (VI) in 2000 and slipped still further. The club returned to the Bezirksoberliga Wiesbaden (VII) in 2007 and won promotion to the Verbandsliga Hessen-Mitte in 2010 where it played until 2013, when it came last and was relegated. In 2014 the club dropped another level, from the Gruppenliga to the Kreisoberliga.

== Honours ==
The club's honours:

=== League ===
- Landesliga Hessen-Mitte
  - Champions: 1974, 1979

=== Cup ===
- Hesse Cup
  - Winners: 1962

== Stadium ==
The club play their home games at the Stadion in der Witz with a capacity of 5,000.
