= Kickers Offenbach II =

- Full name: Offenbacher Fußball-Club Kickers 1901 e. V.
- Founded: 27 May 1901 (club)
- Ground: Sportplatz Wiener Ring
- Capacity: 2,500
- Chairman: Claus-Arwed Lauprecht
- Manager: Petr Ruman
- League: Gruppenliga (VII)
- 2015–16: Verbandsliga Hessen-Süd (VI), 14th (relegated)
Home colours	Away colours

Kickers Offenbach II, is a reserve team of German association football club Kickers Offenbach.

The team, which during the times the senior side played in professional football, played as Kickers Offenbach Amateure, has on occasion played as high as the Hessenliga, the highest league in the state of Hesse.

== History ==
Kickers Offenbach Amateure made a first appearance in higher league football when it won promotion to the Landesliga Hessen-Mitte in 1970 and went on to win this league in its first season there. The team then played in the tier three Amateurliga Hessen from 1971 to 1974 until being disbanded at the end of that season.

It returned to Landesliga level in 1978, now to the Landesliga Hessen-Süd, where it finished runners-up on two occasions before winning the league in 1984. It re-entered the highest football league in the state, now renamed Amateur-Oberliga Hessen but were relegated after only one season despite an eighth-place finish as the senior side had been relegated from the 2. Bundesliga to this league.

Now playing as Kickers Offenbach II while the first team played in amateur football the team spend seven seasons in the Landesliga again until relegated in 1992. It returned to the Landesliga Süd in 1997, the same year the first team won promotion from the Oberliga back to the Regionalliga. Kickers Offenbach II won the Landesliga again in 1999 and returned to what was now the Oberliga Hessen but once more dropped down after only one season when it finished on a relegation rank.

Eight seasons in the Landesliga followed in which the team finished mostly in mid table before another league title took it back up in 2008 to the league now renamed Hessenliga. The team spend a six-season spell in this league with excellent results in the first three seasons with a fourth place in 2008–09 as its best-ever result, but declined after that and was relegated again in 2014. The team played for two seasons in the Verbandsliga Hessen-Süd, the league formerly named Landesliga, until relegated to the Gruppenliga at the end of the 2015–16 season.

== Honours ==
The team's honours:

- Landesliga Hessen-Süd (IV-V)
  - Winners: 1984, 1999, 2008
  - Runners-up: 1979, 1983
- Landesliga Hessen-Mitte (IV)
  - Winners: 1971

== Recent seasons ==
The recent season-by-season performance of the team:

Season	Division	Tier	Position
1999–2000	Oberliga Hessen	IV	15th ↓
2000–01	Landesliga Hessen-Süd	V	3rd
2001–02	Landesliga Hessen-Süd	V	11th
2002–03	Landesliga Hessen-Süd	V	3rd
2003–04	Landesliga Hessen-Süd	V	5th
2004–05	Landesliga Hessen-Süd	V	3rd
2005–06	Landesliga Hessen-Süd	V	9th
2006–07	Landesliga Hessen-Süd	V	3rd
2007–08	Landesliga Hessen-Süd	V	1st ↑
2008–09	Hessenliga	V	4th
2009–10	Hessenliga	V	5th
2010–11	Hessenliga	V	5th
2011–12	Hessenliga	V	12th
2012–13	Hessenliga	V	13th
2013–14	Hessenliga	V	18th ↓
2014–15	Verbandsliga Hessen-Süd	VI	13th
2015–16	Verbandsliga Hessen-Süd	VI	17th ↓
2016–17	Gruppenliga	VII	

- With the introduction of the Regionalligas in 1994 and the 3. Liga in 2008 as the new third tier, below the 2. Bundesliga, all leagues below dropped one tier. Also in 2008, the majority of football leagues in Hesse were renamed, with the Oberliga Hessen becoming the Hessenliga, the Landesliga becoming the Verbandsliga, the Bezirksoberliga becoming the Gruppenliga and the Bezirksliga becoming the Kreisoberliga.

=== Key ===
↑ Promoted	↓ Relegated

== Stadium ==
The team plays its home games at the Sportplatz Wiener Ring which has a capacity of 2,500.
