= FSV Bergshausen =

German football club

- Full name: Freie Sportvereinigung Bergshausen e.V.
- Founded: 1899
- League: Kreisoberliga Kassel (VIII)
- 2018–19: 6th
Home colours	Away colours

FSV Bergshausen is a German association football club from the village of Bergshausen in the municipality of Fuldabrück near Kassel, Hesse.

== History ==
The club was established 6 August 1899 as the gymnastics club Turngemeinde Bergshausen. It was renamed Turn- und Sportgemeinde Bergshausen in 1919 with the introduction of a football department. TSG was a worker's club and as a result was banned as being politically unacceptable in 1933 under the Nazi regime. The footballers were able to carry on as an independent side they were disbanded at the end of World War II by occupying Allied authorities.

The club was reestablished on 13 October 1945 as Freie Sportvereinigung Bergshausen. They played the next several decades as a lower tier local club before enjoying their best campaigns in the late 1970s and early 1980s. FSV advanced out of the Landesliga Hessen Nord (IV) in 1978 to become part of the Amateuroberliga Hessen (III). In their first two seasons there the team earned consecutive fourth-place finishes, before crashing to a 19th-place finish in 1982. The 1982–83 Landesliga season also ended in relegation. FSV recovered and returned to fourth-tier play in 1984–85 and earned a 3rd-place result, but voluntarily withdrew for financial reasons.

In 2000, discussions with Sportgemeinde Dennhausen-Dörnhagen led to the formation of SG Fuldabrück which brought together the football departments of the two groups to help deal with a shortage of players. SG Dennhausen-Dörnhagen is a working partnership of the independent clubs FSV 1895 Dennhausen and FSV 1899 Dörnhagen.

For a time FSV Bergshausen partnered with SG Dennhausen-Dörnhagen to field a combined football side. Each of the three clubs involved still has youth football programs. Nowadays the club plays independently again in the tier eight Kreisoberliga after gaining promotion by winning in 2018 a title in the tier nine Kreisliga A.
