= SV Wehen Wiesbaden II =

- Full name: SV Wehen 1926 Taunusstein e.V.
- Founded: 1926
- Ground: Stadion am Halberg
- Capacity: 5000
- Chairman: Markus Hankammer
- Manager: Thomas Brendel
- League: defunct
- 2014–15: Hessenliga (V), 6th
Home colours	Away colours

SV Wehen Wiesbaden II was a German association football club based in Wiesbaden, Germany. It was the reserve team of SV Wehen Wiesbaden.

== History ==
SV Wehen Wiesbaden II were the reserve and under–23 team to 3. Liga side, SV Wehen Wiesbaden. The played at what used to be SV Wehen's old ground before they moved to Wiesbaden, Stadion am Halberg. They last play in the Hessenliga after finishing 16th in the Regionalliga Süd in 2011.

The team had been a member of the Landesliga Hessen-Mitte from 1992 to 2007, when it won a league championship and gained entry to the Oberliga Hessen. After finishing runners-up in this league the following year, the team was promoted to the Regionalliga Süd. It lasted for three seasons in this league before being relegated back to Hesse's highest league, now called the Hessenliga.

The club announced that it would withdraw its reserve team at the end of the 2014–15 season.

== Honours ==
The club's honours:

- Oberliga Hessen
  - Runners-up: 2008
- Landesliga Hessen-Mitte
  - Champions: 2007
  - Runners-up: 2002

== Recent managers ==
Recent managers of the club:

Manager	Start	Finish
Bernhard Raab	2 August 2010	30 June 2011
Thomas Brendel	1 July 2011	present

== Recent seasons ==
The recent season-by-season performance of the club:

Season	Division	Tier	Position
1999–2000	Landesliga Hessen-Mitte	V	8th
2000–01	Landesliga Hessen-Mitte	V	3rd
2001–02	Landesliga Hessen-Mitte	V	2nd
2002–03	Landesliga Hessen-Mitte	V	5th
2003–04	Landesliga Hessen-Mitte	V	6th
2004–05	Landesliga Hessen-Mitte	V	8th
2005–06	Landesliga Hessen-Mitte	V	7th
2006–07	Landesliga Hessen-Mitte	V	1st ↑
2007–08	Oberliga Hessen	IV	2nd ↑
2008–09	Regionalliga Süd	IV	9th
2009–10	Regionalliga Süd	IV	16th
2010–11	Regionalliga Süd	IV	16th ↓
2011–12	Hessenliga	V	6th
2012–13	Hessenliga	V	5th
2013–14	Hessenliga	V	7th
2014–15	Hessenliga	V	6th

- With the introduction of the Regionalligas in 1994 and the 3. Liga in 2008 as the new third tier, below the 2. Bundesliga, all leagues below dropped one tier. Alongside the introduction of the 3. Liga in 2008, a number of football leagues in Hesse were renamed, with the Oberliga Hessen renamed to Hessenliga, the Landesliga to Verbandsliga, the Bezirksoberliga to Gruppenliga and the Bezirksliga to Kreisoberliga.

=== Key ===
↑ Promoted	↓ Relegated
