= 1. FCA Darmstadt =

German association football club

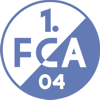
- Full name: 1. Fußballclub Arheilgen Darmstadt e.V.
- Founded: 10 September 1954; 71 years ago
- Ground: Sportplatz am Gehmerweg
- Capacity: 2,800
- Chairman: Andreas Bergemann
- Trainer: Mark & Thorsten Dillmann
- League: Gruppenliga Darmstadt (VII)
- 2020: Gruppenliga Damstadt (VII)
- Website: http://www.fca04-darmstadt.de/
Home colours	Away colours

1. FCA Darmstadt is a German association football club in Darmstadt, Hesse.

Fca Darmstadt's first-team competes in Germany's 7th-tier league, the Gruppenliga, whilst the second team plays in the 11th-tier league Kreisliga C.

The club's greatest success was earning promotion to, and competing in, Germany's 5th-tier league in the state of Hesse, the Hessenliga, from 1967 to 1981 and 2010 to 2013.

== History ==
The club was formed as Fußballclub Arheilgen on 10 September 1954. the club experienced a steady rise, culminating in 1967 in the promotion to the tier three Oberliga Hessen.

In the Oberliga, FCA became a strong side, finishing in the top six in its first five seasons there, with a third place in 1969 and 1970 as its best results. After this, the club slipped into the lower half of the table before coming third once more in 1978. In 1981 however, the side was relegated and would not return to the Oberliga again for almost 30 years.

The club now played in the tier four Landesliga Hessen-Süd, where a second place in 1986 was its best result, but it was followed by relegation in 1987. The club returned to the Landesliga for one more season in 1988–89 but then made a more permanent exit from the league.

The club now spend a lengthy amount of time in the lower amateur leagues of southern Hesse before a title in the tier seven Gruppenliga Darmstadt in 2009 returned it to the level below the Oberliga, now renamed Verbandsliga. In the following season the club, now renamed 1. FCA Darmstadt, won promotion to Hesses highest league once more courtesy to a second place in the Verbandsliga Hessen-Süd, behind local rival and champions Rot-Weiß Darmstadt, and played for three seasons in the Hessenliga before being relegated in 2013. A last-place finish in the Verbandsliga in 2015–16 relegated the club to the Gruppenliga. The club has since remained a mainstay in the league alongside 130 other clubs in the Gruppenliga and has yet to achieve promotion back to the 6th-division.

== Honours ==
The club's honours:

=== League ===
- Verbandsliga Hessen-Süd
  - Runners-up: 1986, 2010
- Gruppenliga Darmstadt
  - Champions: 2006, 2009
  - Runners-up: 2009

=== Cup ===
- Hesse Cup
  - Runners-up: 1961

== Recent managers ==
Recent managers of the club:

Manager	Start	Finish
Dominik Lewis	2019	Present

== Recent seasons ==
The recent season-by-season performance of the club:

Season	Division	Tier	Position
2004–05	Bezirksliga Darmstadt-West	VII	1st ↑
2005–06	Bezirksoberliga Darmstadt	VI	1st ↑
2006–07	Landesliga Hessen-Süd	V	17th ↓
2007–08	Bezirksoberliga Darmstadt	VI	2nd
2008–09	Gruppenliga Darmstadt	VII	1st ↑
2009–10	Verbandsliga Hessen-Süd	VI	2nd ↑
2010–11	Hessenliga	V	12th
2011–12	Hessenliga	V	16th
2012–13	Hessenliga	V	18th ↓
2013–14	Verbandsliga Hessen-Süd	VI	10th
2014–15	Verbandsliga Hessen-Süd	VI	11th
2015–16	Verbandsliga Hessen-Süd	VI	17th ↓
2016–17	Gruppenliga Darmstadt	VII	
2017–18	Gruppenliga Darmstadt	VII	
2018–19	Gruppenliga Darmstadt	VII	
2019–20	Gruppenliga Darmstadt	VII	
2020–21	Gruppenliga Darmstadt	VII	

- With the introduction of the Regionalligas in 1994 and the 3. Liga in 2008 as the new third tier, below the 2. Bundesliga, all leagues below dropped one tier. Also in 2008, a large number of football leagues in Hesse were renamed, with the Oberliga Hessen becoming the Hessenliga, the Landesliga becoming the Verbandsliga, the Bezirksoberliga becoming the Gruppenliga and the Bezirksliga becoming the Kreisoberliga.

↑ Promoted	↓ Relegated
