= 1. FC Eschborn =

German football club

Coordinates: 50°08′24″N 8°33′38″E

- Full name: 1. Fußball Club 1930 Eschborn e.V.
- Founded: 10 September 1930
- Dissolved: 30 June 2016
- Ground: Heinrich-Graf-Sportanlage
- Capacity: 2,800
- 2015–16: Hessenliga (V), 6th (withdrawn)
Home colours	Away colours

1. FC Eschborn was a German association football club which played in Eschborn, a town close to Frankfurt, Hesse.

== History ==
The association was founded 10 September 1930 and after World War II was re-established as SG Eschborn. In 1950, the football department left behind the postwar sports club, which was by then known as Turnverein Eschborn, to become an independent club under its current name.

A perennial lower division amateur side, 1. FC made strides that have seen it playing in the Regionalliga Süd (III) as recently as the 2005–06 season. Their success was mixed, however: while making some strong showings in the fourth division Oberliga Hessen, they were not able to compete effectively at the Regionalliga level. The club was also suffering financially, and unable to find a strong sponsor, faced bankruptcy from which it never recovered.

Eschborn took part in the 2005–06 German Cup tournament on the strength of their championship in the Oberliga Hessen (IV) the previous season, but were eliminated in the opening round by 1. FC Nürnberg.

The club returned to the Hessenliga (V) again after spending the 2007–08 season in the Landesliga. It won the league in 2011–12 and thereby earned promotion to the new Regionalliga Südwest. At this level it lasted for only one season before being relegated back to the Hessenliga. At the end of the 2015–16 Eschborn withdrew from the Hessenliga and competitive football after declaring insolvency and ceased to exist.

== Honours ==
The club's honours:

=== League ===
- Hessenliga
  - Champions: 2003, 2005, 2012
- Landesliga Hessen-Mitte
  - Runners-up: 2000, 2001, 2008

=== Cup ===
- Hesse Cup
  - Runners-up: 2005

== Recent managers ==
Recent managers of the club:

Manager	Start	Finish
Thomas Biehrer	1 July 2008	30 June 2010
Thomas Brendel	1 July 2010	30 June 2011
Sandro Schwarz	1 July 2011	30 June 2013
Dennis Weiland	1 July 2013	30 June 2014
Stephan Adam	1 July 2014	16 October 2015
Rouven Leopold	17 October 2015	30 June 2016

== Recent seasons ==
The recent season-by-season performance of the club:

Season	Division	Tier	Position
1999–2000	Landesliga Hessen-Mitte	V	2nd
2000–01	Landesliga Hessen-Mitte	V	2nd ↑
2001–02	Oberliga Hessen	IV	12th
2002–03	Oberliga Hessen	IV	1st ↑
2003–04	Regionalliga Süd	III	17th ↓
2004–05	Oberliga Hessen	IV	1st ↑
2005–06	Regionalliga Süd	III	18th ↓
2006–07	Oberliga Hessen	IV	16th ↓
2007–08	Landesliga Hessen-Mitte	V	2nd ↑
2008–09	Hessenliga	V	6th
2009–10	Hessenliga	V	6th
2010–11	Hessenliga	V	4th
2011–12	Hessenliga	V	1st ↑
2012–13	Regionalliga Südwest	IV	16th ↓
2013–14	Hessenliga	V	3rd
2014–15	Hessenliga	V	10th
2015–16	Hessenliga	V	6th (withdrawn)

- With the introduction of the Regionalligas in 1994 and the 3. Liga in 2008 as the new third tier, below the 2. Bundesliga, all leagues below dropped one tier. Also in 2008, a large number of football leagues in Hesse were renamed, with the Oberliga Hessen becoming the Hessenliga, the Landesliga becoming the Verbandsliga, the Bezirksoberliga becoming the Gruppenliga and the Bezirksliga becoming the Kreisoberliga. In 2012, the number of Regionalligas was increased from three to five with all Regionalliga Süd clubs except the Bavarian ones entering the new Regionalliga Südwest.

↑ Promoted	↓ Relegated
