= Borussia Fulda =

German football club

- Full name: Sportclub Borussia 1904 Fulda
- Nickname: SCB
- Founded: 4 July 1904; 121 years ago
- Ground: Sportpark Johannisau
- Capacity: 18,000
- League: Kreisoberliga Fulda-Mitte (VIII)
- 2024–25: Kreisoberliga Fulda-Mitte, 4th of 16
Home colours	Away colours

Borussia Fulda is a German association football club from Fulda, Hesse. The club was founded 4 July 1904 as FC Borussia 1904 Fulda and underwent a number of changes in 1923 when they were first joined by Radsportclub 1907 Fulda in July, and then by Kraftsportklub Germania Fulda in September. On 6 September 1923, the association was named 1. SV Borussia 04 Fulda.

== History ==
In 1933, German football was re-organized under the Third Reich into sixteen top-flight divisions and Fulda immediately took up play in the Gauliga Hessen, capturing the division title and advancing to the national playoff round where they went out early. Over the next two seasons the team earned consecutive second-place finishes behind FC Hanau 93 before being relegated in 1938. Fulda returned to first division play in 1939 and the next year claimed the first of what would be three divisional titles over the course of the next four seasons, but were unable to claim any successes at the national level or in play for the Tschammerpokal, predecessor of today's German Cup. They earned their last title playing as Reichsbahn SG Borussia Fulda after a 1943 wartime merger with Reichsbahn SG Fulda. Play in the Gauliga Hessen collapsed in the 1944–45 season as Allied armies advanced into Germany as World War II drew to a close.

At war's end, occupying Allied authorities ordered the dissolution of all organizations in the country, including sports and football associations. The club was re-established as SG Borussia 04/45 Fulda on 17 October 1945 and was united with a club bearing the name 1. SV Borussia Fulda which has been formed on 11 March 1948. A 17 January 1951 merger with SC Fulda led to the creation of SC Borussia 04 Fulda.

SC Borussia played as a local side until winning promotion to the Amateurliga Hessen (III) in 1957 and, with the exception of the 1959–60 season, remained a third division team through to 1963. The club finished well enough that year to earn a place in the newly formed Regionalliga Süd (II) but were promptly relegated. They would compete in the Amateurliga Hessen (III) for the next 11 seasons before slipping to fourth division play in the Landesliga Hessen-Nord in 1975 and then spending the next season in the fifth division.

Fulda has since played largely as fourth tier side with occasional forays into third division competition. After some solid finishes in the Regionalliga Süd (III) in the late 90s the club ran into financial difficulties and nearly collapsed midway through the 1998–99 season. The club played in the Oberliga Hessen (IV) from 2006 to 2009 again, until suffering relegation to the Landesliga. The club after this fell another tier, playing in the Gruppenliga Fulda (VII) from 2010 to 2014. It came close to financial collapse once more in 2010 and had to declare insolvency but managed to recover. A title in the Gruppenliga Fulda in 2014 however took the club back to the Verbandsliga, where in 2015 it won its third title and promotion back to the Hessenliga. After an initial seventh-place finish in 2018 the club's first team was integrated into TSV Lehnerz, the latter becoming SG Barockstadt Fulda Lehnerz.

The junior teams remained with Borussia. Following the merger with Lehnerz, the club was placed last in the Hessenliga and resigned from it. For the 2018–19 season, its reserve team, which has been playing in the Kreisliga Fulda (IX), became the new first team.

== Honours ==
The club's honours:

=== League ===
- Gauliga Hessen
  - Champions: 1934, 1941, 1942, 1944
  - Runners-up: 1935, 1936
- Oberliga Hessen (IV)
  - Champions: 1954, 1957, 1960, 1996, 2001
- Landesliga Hessen-Nord (V)
  - Champions: 1990, 2006, 2015
- Landesliga Hessen/Fulda
  - Champions: 1947
- Gruppenliga Fulda
  - Champions: 2014

=== Cup ===
- Hesse Cup
  - Runners-up: 1993, 1999

== Recent seasons ==
The recent season-by-season performance of the club:

Season	Division	Tier	Position
1999–2000	Regionalliga Süd	III	17th ↓
2000–01	Oberliga Hessen	IV	1st ↑
2001–02	Regionalliga Süd	III	18th ↓
2002–03	Oberliga Hessen	IV	4th
2003–04	Oberliga Hessen	IV	3rd ↓
2004–05	Landesliga Hessen-Nord	V	6th
2005–06	Landesliga Hessen-Nord	V	1st ↑
2006–07	Oberliga Hessen	IV	8th
2007–08	Oberliga Hessen	IV	9th
2008–09	Oberliga Hessen	V	17th ↓
2009–10	Landesliga Hessen-Nord	VI	18th ↓
2010–11	Gruppenliga Fulda	VII	12th
2011–12	Gruppenliga Fulda	VII	6th
2012–13	Gruppenliga Fulda	VII	7th
2013–14	Gruppenliga Fulda	VII	1st ↑
2014–15	Verbandsliga Hessen-Nord	VI	1st ↑
2015–16	Hessenliga	V	11th
2016–17	Hessenliga	V	5th
2017–18	Hessenliga	V	7th (resigned)
2018–19	Kreisliga A Fulda	IX	14th
2019–20	Kreisliga A Fulda	IX	5th
2020–21	Kreisliga A Fulda	IX	8th
2021–22	Kreisliga A Fulda	IX	4th
2022–23	Kreisliga A Fulda	IX	1st ↑
2023–24	Kreisoberliga Fulda Mitte	VIII	

- With the introduction of the Regionalligas in 1994 and the 3. Liga in 2008 as the new third tier, below the 2. Bundesliga, all leagues below dropped one tier. Also in 2008, a large number of football leagues in Hesse were renamed, with the Oberliga Hessen becoming the Hessenliga, the Landesliga becoming the Verbandsliga, the Bezirksoberliga becoming the Gruppenliga and the Bezirksliga becoming the Kreisoberliga.

↑ Promoted	↓ Relegated

== Stadium ==
Borussia Fulda plays in the Sportpark Johannisau (Stadion der Stadt Fulda) which was built in 1957 to hold 30,000 spectators and today has a capacity of 18,000 (~750 seats).
