= KSV Hessen Kassel II =

- Full name: Kasseler Sport-Verein Hessen Kassel e.V.
- Founded: 1893
- Ground: Sportplätze an der Damaschkestrasse
- Chairman: Hans-Jochem Weikert
- Manager: Karl-Heinz Wolf
- League: Hessenliga (V)
- 2025–26: Verbandsliga Hessen-Nord, 1st of 18 (promoted)
Home colours	Away colours

The KSV Hessen Kassel II is a German association football club from the town of Kassel, Hesse. It is the reserve team of KSV Hessen Kassel.

Until 2005 the team played as KSV Hessen Kassel Amateure during the times the senior side played in professional football. During the times the first time was outside professional football and since 2005 the team played under its current name. The team's greatest success has been a Hesse Cup win in 1961 and a runners-up finish in the tier three Amateurliga Hessen in 1967–68. The later qualified the club to participate in the German amateur football championship where it was knocked out in the first round.

== History ==
The team's first notable achievement came in 1961 when it won the Hesse Cup, defeating FC Arheilgen 3–2 and it reached the final of this competition once more in 1968 when it lost to SG Westend Frankfurt.

On league level KSV Hessen Kassel Amateure became a founding member of the tier four Landesliga Hessen-Nord in 1965 and it won this league in the following season to earn promotion to the Amateurliga Hessen for the first time. The team finished runners-up Rot-Weiß Frankfurt in its first season in the Amateurliga in 1967–68. Through this it qualified for the first round of the German amateur football championship but was knocked out in the first round by the reserve team of 1. FC Köln. The season after it dropped to 17th place and was relegated to the Landesliga again.

In 1971 it won a second Landesliga title and returned to the Amateurliga and spent three difficult seasons in the league until 1974. At the end of the 1973–74 season the senior team was relegated from the second division Regionalliga Süd in a league reorganisation that saw the introduction of the 2. Bundesliga and dropped to the Amateurliga Hessen. In the process KSV Hessen Kassel Amateure became KSV Hessen Kassel II and dropped out of the higher amateur league altogether.

The senior team returned to professional football in 1980 and the reserve team returned to the Landesliga in 1982. In 1984 KSV Hessen Kassel Amateure won a third Landesliga title and returned to what had now become the Amateur-Oberliga Hessen, where it spent another three seasons. When, in 1987, the senior side was once more relegated the amateurs dropped back to the Landesliga but returned two years later when both the first and second team won simultaneous titles in their leagues.

KSV Hessen Kassel spent only one season in the 2. Bundesliga in 1989–90, their last to date and consequently the reserve team had to leave the Amateur-Oberliga again in 1990 as first and second teams could not play in the same league together. The reserve team played in the Landesliga for the next five seasons. In 1993 the club was renamed to FC Hessen Kassel and the season after the first team gained entry to the new third division Regionalliga Süd. The season after FC Hessen Kassel II finished runners-up in the Landesliga and moved up to what was now the Oberliga Hessen. It came 18th in the league in 1995–96 and was promptly relegated again. During the 1997–98 season the FC Hessen Kassel had to declare insolvency and both senior and second team where withdrawn from league football.

Restarting in lower amateur football as KSV Hessen Kassel again both the senior and reserve teams had to work their way up through the league system. The first team returned to Oberliga level in 2002 and to Regionalliga level in 2006, while the reserve team made a return to the Landesliga in 2005. It was relegated from this league again but returned in 2007, coming third in the league in 2007–08 and earning promotion. The team returned to the highest league in the state, now renamed to Hessenliga, but came last in the league in 2008–09 and was relegated to what was now the Verbandsliga where it plays today.

== Honours ==
The club's honours:

=== League ===
- Amateurliga Hessen
  - Runners-up: 1968
- Landesliga Hessen-Nord
  - Champions: 1967, 1971, 1984, 1989, 1995
- Verbandsliga Hessen-Nord
  - Runners-up: 2011
- Bezirksoberliga Kassel 2
  - Champions: 2005, 2007
- Bezirksliga Kassel 1
  - Champions: 2004

=== Cup ===
- Hesse Cup
  - Winners: 1961
  - Runners-up: 1968

== Recent seasons ==
The recent season-by-season performance of the club:

Season	Division	Tier	Position
2003–04	Bezirksliga Kassel 1	VII	2nd ↑
2004–05	Bezirksoberliga Kassel 2	VI	1st ↑
2005-06	Landesliga Hessen-Nord	V	15th ↓
2006–07	Bezirksoberliga Kassel 2	VI	1st ↑
2007–08	Landesliga Hessen-Nord	V	3rd ↑
2008–09	Hessenliga	V	18th ↓
2009–10	Verbandsliga Hessen-Nord	VI	5th
2010–11	Verbandsliga Hessen-Nord	VI	2nd
2011–12	Verbandsliga Hessen-Nord	VI	3rd
2012–13	Verbandsliga Hessen-Nord	VI	10th
2013–14	Verbandsliga Hessen-Nord	VI	11th
2014–15	Verbandsliga Hessen-Nord	VI	8th
2015–16	Verbandsliga Hessen-Nord	VI	3rd
2016–17	Verbandsliga Hessen-Nord	VI	14th
2017–18	Verbandsliga Hessen-Nord	VI	16th ↓

- With the introduction of the Regionalligas in 1994 and the 3. Liga in 2008 as the new third tier, below the 2. Bundesliga, all leagues below dropped one tier. Alongside the introduction of the 3. Liga in 2008, a number of football leagues in Hesse were renamed, with the Oberliga Hessen renamed to Hessenliga, the Landesliga to Verbandsliga, the Bezirksoberliga to Gruppenliga and the Bezirksliga to Kreisoberliga.

=== Key ===
↑ Promoted	↓ Relegated
