= KSV Baunatal =

German football club

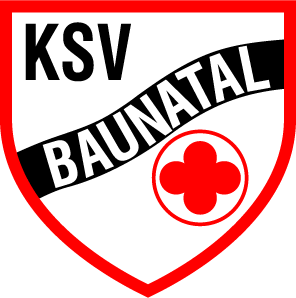
- Full name: Kultur- und Sportverein Baunatal e.V.
- Founded: 13 April 1964
- Ground: Parkstadion
- Capacity: 9,000
- Chairman: Timo Gerhold
- Manager: Tobias Nebe
- League: Hessenliga (V)
- 2025–26: Hessenliga, 5th of 18
Home colours	Away colours

KSV Baunatal is a German association football club based in Baunatal, Hesse. The team was founded on 13 April 1964 out of the union of KSV Altenritte and KSV Altenbauna.

The club's greatest success has been its three seasons spent in the second division, the 2nd Bundesliga Süd, from 1976 to 1979.

== History ==
Predecessor side KSV Altenritte had roots that go back to the much earlier establishment of the gymnastics club Turnverein Gut-Heil Altenritte on 2 September 1892. A football department was founded within this club in 1914. In 1933, TV was joined by the membership of Arbeiter TV Altenritte – one of the many worker's sports clubs disbanded as politically unpalatable under the Nazi regime – to become VfL Altenritte. In 1945, following World War II, the team re-emerged as KSV Alteritte.

Another predecessor, KSV Altenbauna, was established in 1904 as Deutscher Turnverein Altenbauna and in 1918, following World War I, played as Deutscher Turn- und Sportverein Altenbauna. DTSV became TV Gut-Heil Altenbauna in 1933 and KSV Altenbauna in 1945.

After the 1964 merger that united these two clubs as KSV Baunatal, the association grew again when joined by SV Baunatal in 1970. SV was founded in 1921 as Arbeiter Turn- und Sportverein Kirchbauna and was one of the many worker's clubs that disappeared under the Third Reich. It was re-established in 1945 as Freier SV Kirchbauna by the former members of ATSV and another worker's side known as TV Gut Heil Kirchbauna. FSV briefly adopted the name SpVgg Kirchbauna in 1955 before becoming SV Baunatal the same year.

The long string of mergers of these unremarkable sides paid dividends when KSV Baunatal rose up out of lower-tier competition into the Oberliga Hessen (III) in 1970. The club slipped to the Landesliga Hessen-Nord (IV) for a single season, but promptly reclaimed a place in the Oberliga. An Amateur Oberliga Hessen (III) title in 1976 led to a three season long stint in the 2nd Bundesliga Süd. Through the 70s and 80s KSV made half a dozen appearances in the DFB-Pokal, going out in the preliminary rounds on each occasion.

The team then played as a third-tier side in the Oberliga Hessen until being relegated in 1991 and for a while was an elevator side, moving frequently up and down between third- and fifth-tier competition. KSV has been firmly settled into the Oberliga Hessen (IV) since 1999, generally finishing in the lower half of the table, while managing to earn better results on occasion.

The club gradually improved season by season from 2007 onwards and, in 2012–13, it was able to win another title in the Hessenliga and earn promotion to the Regionalliga Südwest but was initially relegated again after finishing 17th in the league. However, the insolvency of SSV Ulm 1846 and the withdrawal of Eintracht Frankfurt II saved the club from relegation. The following season KSV once more finished 17th and this time was unable to avoid relegation.

== Honours ==
=== League ===
- Hessenliga (III)
  - Champions: 1976, 2013
  - Runners-up: 1980, 2001, 2012
- Landesliga Hessen-Nord (IV)
  - Champions: 1970, 1972, 1994, 1999

=== Cup ===
- Hessenpokal
  - Winners: 1982, 1983
  - Runners-up: 1987, 2019

== Recent managers ==
Recent managers of the club:

Manager	Start	Finish
Bernd Lichte	1 July 2006	19 April 2008
Carsten Lakies	20 April 2008	30 June 2010
Tobias Nebe	1 July 2010	present

== Recent seasons ==
The recent season-by-season performance of the club:

Season	Division	Tier	Position
1999–2000	Hessenliga	IV	12th
2000–01	Hessenliga	IV	2nd
2001–02	Hessenliga	IV	14th
2002–03	Hessenliga	IV	6th
2003–04	Hessenliga	IV	11th
2004–05	Hessenliga	IV	4th
2005–06	Hessenliga	IV	14th
2006–07	Hessenliga	IV	13th
2007–08	Hessenliga	IV	8th
2008–09	Hessenliga	V	5th
2009–10	Hessenliga	V	3rd
2010–11	Hessenliga	V	3rd
2011–12	Hessenliga	V	2nd
2012–13	Hessenliga	V	1st ↑
2013–14	Regionalliga Südwest	IV	17th
2014–15	Regionalliga Südwest	IV	17th ↓
2015–16	Hessenliga	V	12th
2016–17	Hessenliga	V	9th
2017–18	Hessenliga	V	10th
2018–19	Hessenliga	V	7th

- With the introduction of the Regionalligas in 1994 and the 3. Liga in 2008 as the new third tier, below the 2. Bundesliga, all leagues below dropped one tier. Also in 2008, a large number of football leagues in Hesse were renamed, with the Oberliga Hessen becoming the Hessenliga, the Landesliga becoming the Verbandsliga, the Bezirksoberliga becoming the Gruppenliga and the Bezirksliga becoming the Kreisoberliga.

↑ Promoted	↓ Relegated
