= OSC Vellmar =

German sports club

- Full name: Obervellmarer Sportclub
- Founded: 1892 (1918)
- Ground: Sportplatz Heckershäuser Straße
- Capacity: 4,000
- Chairman: Roland Tölle
- Manager: Mario Deppe
- League: Hessenliga (V)
- 2015–16: 14th
Home colours	Away colours

OSC Vellmar is a German sports club based in Vellmar, Hesse which has departments for budō, weight lifting, handball, inline hockey, Taekwondo, dance, table tennis, gymnastics, and winter sports.

== History ==
The club's football team was established in 1918 and has played in the fourth division Oberliga Hessen since 2000 with the exception of the 2003–04 and 2007–08 seasons played in the Landesliga Hessen-Nord (V). Their best result was a second-place finish in 2013–14.

The origins of the club go back to the 1892 founding of Älterer Turnverein Obervellmar. In 1933, the association was forced to merge with Arbeiter Turn- und Sportverein 1907 Obervellmar under the policies of the Nazi regime which saw to the dissolution of worker's clubs which were considered to be ideologically undesirable. By 1934 the club was known as TuS Obervellmar and was renamed OSC Vellmar in 1976.

OSC plays its home matches at the Sportplatz Heckershäuser Straße which has a capacity of 4,000.

== Honours ==
The club's honours:

- Hessenliga (V)
  - Runners-up: 2014
- Landesliga Hessen-Nord (V)
  - Champions: 2000, 2008
  - Runners-up: 1999, 2004

== Recent managers ==
Recent managers of the club:

Manager	Start	Finish
Mario Deppe	1 July 2008	present

== Recent seasons ==
The recent season-by-season performance of the club:

Season	Division	Tier	Position
1999–2000	Landesliga Hessen-Nord	V	1st ↑
2000–01	Oberliga Hessen	IV	9th
2001–02	Oberliga Hessen	IV	13th
2002–03	Oberliga Hessen	IV	15th ↓
2003–04	Landesliga Hessen-Nord	V	2nd ↑
2004–05	Oberliga Hessen	IV	15th
2005–06	Oberliga Hessen	IV	7th
2006–07	Oberliga Hessen	IV	15th ↓
2007–08	Landesliga Hessen-Nord	V	1st ↑
2008–09	Hessenliga	V	9th
2009–10	Hessenliga	V	15th
2010–11	Hessenliga	V	6th
2011–12	Hessenliga	V	7th
2012–13	Hessenliga	V	11th
2013–14	Hessenliga	V	2nd
2014–15	Hessenliga	V	11th
2015–16	Hessenliga	V	14th
2016–17	Hessenliga	V	

- With the introduction of the Regionalligas in 1994 and the 3. Liga in 2008 as the new third tier, below the 2. Bundesliga, all leagues below dropped one tier. Also in 2008, a large number of football leagues in Hesse were renamed, with the Oberliga Hessen becoming the Hessenliga, the Landesliga becoming the Verbandsliga, the Bezirksoberliga becoming the Gruppenliga and the Bezirksliga becoming the Kreisoberliga.

↑ Promoted	↓ Relegated
