= Rot-Weiss Frankfurt =

German football club

- Full name: Sportgemeinschaft Rot-Weiss 01 Frankfurt e.V.
- Nickname(s): Die Roten
- Founded: 11 November 1901; 123 years ago
- Ground: Stadion am Brentanobad
- Capacity: 5,500
- Chairman: Ersan Dincer
- Manager: Siar Daudi
- League: Verbandsliga Hessen-Süd (VI)
- 2019–20: 13th
- Website: https://rot-weiss-frankfurt.de/
Home colours	Away colours

SG Rot-Weiss Frankfurt 01 is a German association football club from Frankfurt am Main. The association was founded on 11 November 1901 as FV Amicitia 1901 Bockenheim in what is today the city district of Bockenheim.

== History ==
=== Early years ===
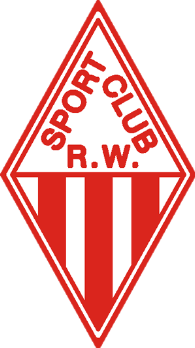
Logo of SC Rot Weiss Frankfurt ca. 1931

The Frankfurt side played under a number of different names in the decades before World War II. They were known as Frankfurter FV Amicitia from 1909 to 1919, then playing as VfR 1901 Frankfurt after World War I until 1926, playing in the Kreisliga Nordmain. Between 1926 and 1935 they were called SC Rot Weiß Frankfurt and played mostly in the Bezirksliga Main-Hessen. The team enjoyed some success in the early 30s, advancing to the finals of the Southern German championship in 1930 and 1931.

In 1933, German football was re-organized into sixteen top-flight divisions and Rot-Weiß appeared in the Gauliga Südwest for three seasons between 1938 and 1941. In 1941, the division was split into the Gauliga Westmark and the Gauliga Hessen-Nassau where the club played another three years as Reichsbahn TSV Rot-Weiß Frankfurt. Their best result was a divisional vice-championship in '41.

=== Postwar ===
After the war occupying Allied authorities ordered the dissolution of all organizations in Germany, including sports and football associations. In late 1945 the club was re-constituted as SG Bockenheim and in 1947, once again named Rot-Weiß, played a single season in the first division Oberliga Süd before being relegated. The club set an attendance record that still stands to this day when they played 1. FC Nürnberg before 27,000 fans.

Rot-Weiß competed as a third-tier side in the Amateurliga Hessen through most of the 1960s and 1970s with a single season cameo in the Regionalliga Süd (II) in 1968–69. The club then slipped to the Landesliga Hessen-Süd in 1979 where they played for five of the next seven seasons. From the late 1980s to the mid-1990s they were once again a third division side and captured the Oberliga Hessen championship in 1990. Participation in the subsequent promotion round for the 2. Bundesliga ended in failure. Under mounting financial pressure the team's performance slipped and by the mid-1990s they were playing fourth and fifth division football. Rot-Weiß played in the Hessenliga (V) again from 2007 to 2012, before being relegated, and the primary focus of the club has shifted to its youth sides. A runners-up finish in the Verbandsliga in 2014–15 qualified the club for the promotion round to the Hessenliga where it overcame Hünfelder SV and Viktoria Kelsterbach to win promotion.

== Honours ==
The club's honours:

=== League ===
- Nordkreis-Liga (I)
  - Champions: 1918
- Hessenliga (II/III)
  - Champions: 1947, 1968, 1990
  - Runners-up: 1991, 2016
- Landesliga Hessen-Süd (IV)
  - Champions: 1966, 1983, 1986
  - Runners-up: 2002, 2006, 2007
- Verbandsliga Hessen-Süd (VI)
  - Runners-up: 2015

=== Cup ===
- Hesse Cup (Tiers III-VII)
  - Winners: 1971, 1974, 1989, 1992
  - Runners-up: 1946, 1994

== Recent managers ==
Recent managers of the club:

Manager	Start	Finish
Kenan Akbas	1 July 2007	27 October 2007
Klaus Dörner	7 November 2007	16 March 2008
Andreas Baumbach	1 July 2008	2 May 2009
Ignjac Kresic	5 May 2009	30 January 2011
Benjamin Sachs	30 January 2011	29 November 2011
Sasan Tabib	29 November 2011	30 June 2012
Daniyel Cimen	1 July 2015	2017
...	...	...
Slobodan Komljenović	2018	

== Recent seasons ==
The recent season-by-season performance of the club:

Season	Division	Tier	Position
1999–2000	Bezirksoberliga Frankfurt	VI	3rd
2000–01	Bezirksoberliga Frankfurt	VI	1st ↑
2001–02	Landesliga Hessen-Süd	V	2nd
2002–03	Landesliga Hessen-Süd	V	12th
2003–04	Landesliga Hessen-Süd	V	7th
2004–05	Landesliga Hessen-Süd	V	4th
2005–06	Landesliga Hessen-Süd	V	2nd
2006–07	Landesliga Hessen-Süd	V	2nd ↑
2007–08	Oberliga Hessen	IV	15th
2008–09	Hessenliga	V	10th
2009–10	Hessenliga	V	7th
2010–11	Hessenliga	V	14th
2011–12	Hessenliga	V	17th ↓
2012–13	Verbandsliga Hessen-Süd	VI	4th
2013–14	Verbandsliga Hessen-Süd	VI	3rd
2014–15	Verbandsliga Hessen-Süd	VI	2nd ↑
2015–16	Hessenliga	V	2nd
2016–17	Hessenliga	V	3rd
2017–18	Hessenliga	V	15th ↓
2018–19	Verbandsliga Hessen-Süd	VI	9th
2019–20	Verbandsliga Hessen-Süd	VI	

- With the introduction of the Regionalligas in 1994 and the 3. Liga in 2008 as the new third tier, below the 2. Bundesliga, all leagues below dropped one tier. Also in 2008, a large number of football leagues in Hesse were renamed, with the Oberliga Hessen becoming the Hessenliga, the Landesliga becoming the Verbandsliga, the Bezirksoberliga becoming the Gruppenliga and the Bezirksliga becoming the Kreisoberliga.

↑ Promoted	↓ Relegated

== Stadium ==
The club plays its home matches in the Stadion am Brentanobad (capacity 6,000) built in 1940 and re-furbished in 1998. It is also used by women's club 1. FFC Frankfurt.
