= FSV Frankfurt II =

- Full name: Fußballsportverein Frankfurt 1899 e.V.
- Dissolved: 2014
- Ground: Frankfurter Volksbank Stadion
- Capacity: 12,542
- League: Defunct
- 2013–14: Hessenliga (V), 5th
- Website: fsv-frankfurt.de
Home colours	Away colours

The FSV Frankfurt II was a German association football club from the town of Frankfurt, Hesse. It was the reserve team of FSV Frankfurt.

Until 2005 the team played as FSV Frankfurt Amateure during the times the senior side played in professional football. During the times the first time was outside professional football and permanently since 2005 the team played under the name of FSV Frankfurt II. The team's greatest success has been a championship in the Hessenliga in 2010 which took the club up to Regionalliga level for three seasons. At the end of the 2013–14 season the team was disbanded after a rule change that freed professional clubs from having to field a reserve side.

== History ==
Playing at regional amateur level FSV Frankfurt II first rose to higher league levels in 1985 when it won promotion to the tier four Landesliga Hessen-Süd, at a time when the senior team had dropped out of professional football two years earlier. It was relegated from this league after only one season and disappeared into regional football again.

The team made a return to Landesliga level in 2005 and won the league in 2008–09, the first season after it had been renamed to Verbandsliga. In the Hessenliga for the first time FSV Frankfurt II won this league as well in 2010 and earned promotion to the tier four Regionalliga. It finished in the relegation zone in the Regionalliga Süd in 2010–11 and 2011–12 but was rescued by insolvencies of other clubs in the first instance and by a league reform in the second. The team entered the new Regionalliga Südwest for 2012–13 and finished once more on a relegation spot, now dropping back to the Hessenliga again. It finished fifth in the league in 2013–14 and the team was disbanded at the end of it as professional sides were no longer required to field reserve teams. The mother club had decided to withdraw the side for financial reasons, similar to Eintracht Frankfurt II and Bayer 04 Leverkusen II.

The management of FSV Frankfurt stated that, since 2008, only one player from the reserve side had managed to advanced to the first team while a much larger number had moved up directly from the under 19 team. Additionally, fielding the reserve side in the Regionalliga had taken up 70 percent of the budged of the club's academy while, even at Oberliga level, it still had taken up 55 percent.

== Honours ==
The club's honours:

- Hessenliga (V)
  - Champions: 2010
- Verbandsliga Hessen-Süd (VI)
  - Champions: 2009
- Bezirksoberliga Frankfurt-West (VI)
  - Champions: 2005
- Bezirksliga Frankfurt (VII)
  - Champions: 2004

== Recent seasons ==
The recent season-by-season performance of the club:

Season	Division	Tier	Position
1999–2000			
2000–01			
2001–02			
2002–03			
2003–04	Bezirksliga Frankfurt	VII	1st ↑
2004–05	Bezirksoberliga Frankfurt-West	VI	1st ↑
2005–06	Landesliga Hessen-Süd	V	3rd
2006–07	Landesliga Hessen-Süd	V	8th
2007–08	Landesliga Hessen-Süd	V	3rd
2008–09	Verbandsliga Hessen-Süd	VI	1st ↑
2009–10	Hessenliga	V	1st ↑
2010–11	Regionalliga Süd	IV	15th
2011–12	Regionalliga Süd	IV	17th
2012–13	Regionalliga Südwest	IV	17th ↓
2013–14	Hessenliga	V	5th

- With the introduction of the Regionalligas in 1994 and the 3. Liga in 2008 as the new third tier, below the 2. Bundesliga, all leagues below dropped one tier. Alongside the introduction of the 3. Liga in 2008, a number of football leagues in Hesse were renamed, with the Oberliga Hessen renamed to Hessenliga, the Landesliga to Verbandsliga, the Bezirksoberliga to Gruppenliga and the Bezirksliga to Kreisoberliga.

=== Key ===
↑ Promoted	↓ Relegated
