= TSV Eintracht Stadtallendorf =

German football club

- Full name: Turn- und Sportverein Eintracht 1920 e.V. Stadtallendorf
- Founded: 1920; 106 years ago
- Ground: Herrenwaldstadion
- Capacity: 4,000
- Chairman: Reiner Bremer
- Manager: Dragan Sicaja
- League: Hessenliga (V)
- 2025–26: Hessenliga, 3rd of 18
Home colours	Away colours

TSV Eintracht Stadtallendorf is a German association football club from the city of Stadtallendorf, Hesse. The footballers are part of a sports club that also includes departments for athletics, badminton, gymnastics, handball, judo, swimming, and volleyball.

== History ==
The origins of the club are in the establishment in 1920 of the football club Fußballverein Eintracht Allendorf. In 1956, this club merged with Turn- und Sportverein Blau-Weiß Allendorf to form the present day association.

Between 1965 and 1966, TSV played in the Landesliga Hessen/Nord (IV), before becoming part of the Landesliga Hessen/Mitte (IV) in 1967, where they played until being sent down following a 16th-place finish in 1970. The team slipped into lower-level competition before appearing in the Bezirksoberliga Gießen-Marburg Nord (VI) between 1991 and 1998. They won their way back to the Landesliga Hessen/Mitte (V) in 1998 on the strength of a first-place result in the Bezirksoberliga, and ten years later captured a Landesliga title to advance to the Oberliga Hessen (V). Since 2017 they have experienced a series of promotions and relegations between the Hessenliga and the Regionalliga Südwest.

== Honours ==
=== League ===
- Landesliga Hessen-Mitte (V)
  - Champions: 2008, 2020
  - Runners-up: 2004
- Bezirksoberliga Gießen-Marburg Nord
  - Champions (VI): 1998

=== Cup ===
- Hesse Cup
  - Runners-up: 1963

== Recent managers ==
Recent managers of the club:

Manager	Start	Finish
Dragan Sicaja	1 July 2009	30 June 2011
Stefan Hassler	1 July 2011	present

== Recent seasons ==
The recent season-by-season performance of the club:

Season	Division	Tier	Position
1999–2000	Landesliga Hessen-Mitte	V	5th
2000–01	Landesliga Hessen-Mitte	V	7th
2001–02	Landesliga Hessen-Mitte	V	5th
2002–03	Landesliga Hessen-Mitte	V	3rd
2003–04	Landesliga Hessen-Mitte	V	2nd
2004–05	Landesliga Hessen-Mitte	V	3rd
2005–06	Landesliga Hessen-Mitte	V	3rd
2006–07	Landesliga Hessen-Mitte	V	10th
2007–08	Landesliga Hessen-Mitte	V	1st ↑
2008–09	Hessenliga	V	8th
2009–10	Hessenliga	V	4th
2010–11	Hessenliga	V	8th
2011–12	Hessenliga	V	15th
2012–13	Hessenliga	V	9th
2013–14	Hessenliga	V	11th
2014–15	Hessenliga	V	9th
2015–16	Hessenliga	V	5th
2016–17	Hessenliga	V	2nd ↑
2017–18	Regionalliga Südwest	IV	12th
2018–19	Regionalliga Südwest	IV	17th ↓
2019–20	Hessenliga	V	1st ↑
2020–21	Regionalliga Südwest	IV	22nd ↓

- With the introduction of the Regionalligas in 1994 and the 3. Liga in 2008 as the new third tier, below the 2. Bundesliga, all leagues below dropped one tier. Also in 2008, a large number of football leagues in Hesse were renamed, with the Oberliga Hessen becoming the Hessenliga, the Landesliga becoming the Verbandsliga, the Bezirksoberliga becoming the Gruppenliga and the Bezirksliga becoming the Kreisoberliga.

↑ Promoted	↓ Relegated

== Current squad ==
As of 19 February 2018

Note: Flags indicate national team as defined under FIFA eligibility rules; some limited exceptions apply. Players may hold more than one non-FIFA nationality.

No.	Pos.	Nation	Player
1	GK	CRO	Hrojve Vincek
3	MF	GER	Daniel Vier
5	MF	GER	Jascha Döringer
6	DF	GER	Kevin Vidakovic
7	DF	GER	Dominik Völk
8	DF	GER	Ceyhun Dinler
9	MF	GER	Laurin Vogt
10	MF	TUR	Erdinc Solak
11	MF	ESP	Israel Suero Fernández
13	DF	CRO	Tomislav Baltić
15	MF	GER	Valon Ademi
16	DF	GER	Steven Preuß

No.	Pos.	Nation	Player
18	DF	GER	Kristian Gaudermann
19	FW	GER	Delangelo Williams
20	DF	GER	Markus Auer
21	MF	GER	Damijan Heuser
22	GK	GER	Manuel Bachmeier
23	MF	KOS	Muhamet Arifi
25	FW	GER	Milano Michel
26	MF	SRB	Amar Žildžović
28	FW	GER	Dorian Miric
30	DF	GER	Wessam Abdel-Ghani
—	FW	CRO	Mihovil Geljić

== Notable players ==
- (Germany) Eike Immel, went on to play with Bundesliga teams Borussia Dortmund and VfB Stuttgart, as well as appearing with the national side and with Manchester City.
- (Afghanistan) Masih Saighani
