= Hünfelder SV =

German football club

- Full name: Hünfelder Sportverein 1919 e. V.
- Nickname: HSV
- Founded: 22 June 1919
- Ground: Rhönkampfbahn
- Capacity: 4,000
- Chairman: Lothar Mihm
- Manager: Oliver Bunzenthal
- League: Hessenliga (V)
- 2025–26: Hessenliga, 8th of 18
Home colours	Away colours

Hünfelder SV is a German association football club from the city of Hünfeld, Hesse. In addition to a football section, the sports club has departments for athletics, basketball, gymnastics, handball, table tennis, and volleyball.

== History ==
=== 1909 to 1945 ===
Also the club was only formed in 1919, it was predated by the Turn- und Sportverein Fortuna, which was formed in 1909 and dissolved during the difficult years of the First World War.

To re-ignite sporting live, and especially football, a handful of enthusiasts placed an add in the local newspaper, the Hünfelder Kreisblatte, requesting all interested people to meet on Sunday, 22 June 1919 in a local pub, to form a new sports and football club. The new club started out with football as its only sport, adding other departments later.

In its early days, the club existed under difficult circumstances. Having no regular playing field, it had to ask local farmers for permission to play on their fields, which was usually only granted after the harvest. The club played its first official match on 29 July 1919, losing 1–3 against Adler Neukirchen and playing at Sargenzeller Höhe, was only a friendly but the team soon entered into competitive football, joining the local B-Klasse. A first championship in this league was won in 1925–26.

The club remained stagnant on local level and did not distinguish itself in the following years. The rise of the Nazis to power in 1933 did not initially change this, but from 1936, under the leadership of the new club chairman Conrad Schäfer, the HSV slowly improved.

During the Second World War, the club managed to continue to field a team because a hospital of the German army was based in town and recovering soldiers were permitted to field for the club. In the war years, the HSV thereby attracted much stronger players as it usually could, having even a former German international, Hermann Gramlich, in their ranks. Eventually, in December 1944, even this came to a halt and football ceased due to the worsening war situation.

The club entered a short hibernation, lasting until September 1945, when a club meeting re-ignited activity within the Hünfelder SV.

=== 1945 to present ===
Re-entering competitive football, the club at first played in the local A-Klasse, earning promotion to the Bezirksklasse in 1948, then the second-highest league in Hesse. The club remained in this league until 1962, when it achieved promotion to the Hessenliga, the highest league in the state and the third tier of German football in those days. In its first season on this level, 1962–63, the club did rather well finishing fifth out of 16 teams. Additionally, the club managed to win the Hesse Cup in this season. It was also the last season before introduction of the new Bundesliga.

The 1963–64 season was not quite as successful but with Norbert Fladung the club had the best goal scorer in the league with 34 goals. From then on, the HSV had to play against relegation in its league, which became a fact in 1967, when the club had to drop down to the Landesliga Hessen-Nord (IV). In this league, the team spent only one season before returning to the Amateurliga Hessen. In 1970, the club was once more relegated from this league and would not be able to return to it for 33 years.

The club played the next nine seasons as a mid-table side in the Landesliga before suffering another relegation in 1979. In 1982, it returned to the Landesliga Nord for three seasons, being relegated again in 1985. After one season, it managed to regain its Landesliga status. The fortunes of the club started to improve again, climbing up in the table season by season, culminating in two second-place finishes in 1990 and 1991. Missing out on promotion both times, the HSV fell back in the season standings again and was relegated in 1998 once more. After two seasons in the Bezirksoberliga Fulda, it returned to the Landesliga. From 2000 onwards, the club had an impressive run in this league, finishing in the top-four in all seven seasons. After a league championship in 2003, a return to the Hessenliga, now the fourth tier of the German league system, was an unsuccessful experience, being relegated straight away again. In 2008, the club once more achieved promotion to the highest league in the state through a second-place finish in the Landesliga.

The club played for three seasons in the Hessenliga (V) before being relegated once more at the end of the 2010–11 season to make an immediate return the following year. It played a good first season back in the league but came last in its second year and was relegated back to the Verbandsliga in 2014. A runners-up finish in the Verbandsliga in 2015 qualified the club for the promotion round to the Hessenliga but two defeats against Viktoria Kelsterbach and Rot-Weiß Frankfurt meant the club missed out on promotion.

== Honours ==
The club's honours:

=== League ===
- Landesliga Hessen-Nord
  - Champions: 1968, 2003
  - Runners up: 1990, 1991, 2005, 2006, 2008
- Verbandsliga Hessen-Nord
  - Champions: 2012
  - Runners-up: 2015

=== Cup ===
- Hesse Cup
  - Winners: 1963

== Recent seasons ==
The recent season-by-season performance of the club:

Season	Division	Tier	Position
1999–2000	Bezirksoberliga Fulda	VI	↑
2000–01	Landesliga Hessen-Nord	V	4th
2001–02	Landesliga Hessen-Nord	V	3rd
2002–03	Landesliga Hessen-Nord	V	1st ↑
2003–04	Oberliga Hessen	IV	18th ↓
2004–05	Landesliga Hessen-Nord	V	2nd
2005–06	Landesliga Hessen-Nord	V	2nd
2006–07	Landesliga Hessen-Nord	V	3rd
2007–08	Landesliga Hessen-Nord	V	2nd ↑
2008–09	Hessenliga	V	9th
2009–10	Hessenliga	V	9th
2010–11	Hessenliga	V	16th ↓
2011–12	Verbandsliga Hessen-Nord	VI	1st ↑
2012–13	Hessenliga	V	8th
2013–14	Hessenliga	V	19th ↓
2014–15	Verbandsliga Hessen-Nord	VI	2nd
2015–16	Verbandsliga Hessen-Nord	VI	8th
2016–17	Verbandsliga Hessen-Nord	VI	

- With the introduction of the Regionalligas in 1994 and the 3. Liga in 2008 as the new third tier, below the 2. Bundesliga, all leagues below dropped one tier. Also in 2008, a large number of football leagues in Hesse were renamed, with the Oberliga Hessen becoming the Hessenliga, the Landesliga becoming the Verbandsliga, the Bezirksoberliga becoming the Gruppenliga and the Bezirksliga becoming the Kreisoberliga.

↑ Promoted	↓ Relegated
