= Verbandsliga Hessen-Nord =

- Founded: 1965
- Country: Germany
- State: Hesse
- Number of clubs: 17
- Level on pyramid: Level 6
- Promotion to: Hessenliga
- Relegation to: Gruppenliga Fulda; Gruppenliga Kassel Gruppe 1; Gruppenliga Kassel Gruppe 2
- Domestic cup(s): Hessenpokal
- Current champions: SV Adler Weidenhausen (2021–22)

The Verbandsliga Hessen-Nord, until 2008 named Landesliga Hessen-Nord, is currently the sixth tier of the German football league system. Until the introduction of the 3. Liga in 2008 it was the fifth tier of the league system, and until the introduction of the Regionalligas in 1994 it was the fourth tier.

== Overview ==
The Verbandsliga Hessen-Nord was formed in 1965 as the Landesliga Hessen-Nord, a tier four feeder league to the then Amateurliga Hessen.

The winner of the Verbandsliga Hessen-Nord automatically qualifies for the Hessenliga, the runners-up needs to compete with the runners-up of Verbandsliga Hessen-Süd and Verbandsliga Hessen-Mitte and the 15th placed team of the Hessenliga for another promotion spot.

The Verbandsliga Hessen-Nord is fed by the Gruppenliga Hessen-Fulda, Hessen-Kassel Gruppe 1 and Hessen-Kassel Gruppe 2. The winners of those divisions are automatically promoted to the Verbandsliga, the runners-up play-off for another promotion spot.

Up until 1973 it was common for teams to move between Landesligen, resulting in the fact that some teams have won titles in two different Landesligen. This practice has since stopped.

The region covered by the Verbandsliga Hessen-Nord is not traditionally a part of the Southern German Football Association, it only became part of it with the formation of the state of Hesse in 1945.

Along with the renaming of the Oberliga Hessen to Hessenliga in 2008, the Landesliga was renamed Verbandsliga Hessen-Nord.

== League champions ==
The league champions:

=== Verbandsliga ===
The league champions since the renaming of the league in 2008:

Season	Club
2008–09	1. FC Schwalmstadt
2009–10	VfB Süsterfeld
2010–11	FSC Lohfelden
2011–12	Hünfelder SV
2012–13	TSV Lehnerz
2013–14	1. FC Schwalmstadt
2014–15	Borussia Fulda
2015–16	SV Steinbach
2016–17	SV Buchonia Flieden
2017–18	Hünfelder SV
2018–19	SV Steinbach
2019–20	Hünfelder SV
2020–21	Season curtailed and annulled
2021–22	SV Adler Weidenhausen

=== Landesliga ===
The league champions until the renaming of the league in 2008:

Season	Club
1965–66	Hermannia Kassel
1966–67	KSV Hessen Kassel II
1967–68	Hünfelder SV
1968–69	Hermannia Kassel
1969–70	KSV Baunatal
1970–71	KSV Hessen Kassel II
1971–72	KSV Baunatal
1972–73	GSV Eintracht Baunatal
1973–74	BC Sport Kassel
1974–75	Hermannia Kassel
1975–76	SV Olympia 1914 Kassel
1976–77	VfB Schrecksbach
1977–78	FSV Bergshausen
1978–79	TuSpo 1886 Ziegenhain
1979–80	SG Bad Soden

Season	Club
1980–81	Hessen Bad Hersfeld
1981–82	CSC 03 Kassel
1982–83	VfB Schrecksbach
1983–84	KSV Hessen Kassel II
1984–85	Hessen Bad Hersfeld
1985–86	GSV Eintracht Baunatal
1986–87	CSC 03 Kassel
1987–88	Hermannia Kassel
1988–89	KSV Hessen Kassel II
1989–90	Borussia Fulda
1990–91	SC Upland Willingen
1991–92	SC Neukirchen
1992–93	FSC Lohfelden
1993–94	KSV Baunatal

Season	Club
1994–95	KSV Hessen Kassel II
1995–96	SV Buchonia Flieden
1996–97	FV Steinau
1997–98	SVA Bad Hersfeld
1998–99	KSV Baunatal
1999–00	OSC Vellmar
2000–01	SV Buchonia Flieden
2001–02	KSV Hessen Kassel
2002–03	Hünfelder SV
2003–04	1. FC Schwalmstadt
2004–05	TSG Wattenbach
2005–06	Borussia Fulda
2006–07	FSC Lohfelden
2007–08	OSC Vellmar

- KSV Hessen Kassel hold the absolute record for Landesliga titles in Hessen, having won six, all in the Landesliga Nord. Five of those however were won by their reserve team.

=== Additionally promoted teams ===
These clubs were promoted to the Oberliga after finishing second and third in the league:

Season	Club
1966–67	FV Breidenbach
1970–71	GSV Eintracht Baunatal
1983–84	Borussia Fulda
1988–89	SG Bad Soden
1993–94	RSV Petersberg
1994–95	SG Bad Soden; SC Upland Willingen
2001–02	FSC Lohfelden
2003–04	OSC Vellmar
2007–08	Hünfelder SV; KSV Hessen Kassel II
2008–09	SVA Bad Hersfeld
2009–10	SV Buchonia Flieden
2018–19	SV Neuhof
2019–20	SV Buchonia Flieden
