= SG Barockstadt Fulda-Lehnerz =

- Full name: Sportgemeinschaft Barockstadt Fulda-Lehnerz e.V.
- Founded: 1965; 61 years ago
- Ground: Sportpark Johannisau; Stadion an der Richard-Müller-Straße
- Capacity: 7,500; 3,000
- Manager: Daniyel Cimen
- League: Regionalliga Südwest (IV)
- 2025–26: Regionalliga Südwest, 10th of 18

The SG Barockstadt Fulda-Lehnerz is a German association football club from the Lehnerz suburb of Fulda, Hesse.

The club's greatest success has been to earn promotion to the tier four Regionalliga Südwest in 2022.

== History ==
Former crest of TSV Lehnerz

The club was formed on 2 December 1965 as Turn- und Sportverein Lehnerz and joined competitive football a year later, in 1966. The first three decades of its history the club spent as a non-descript amateur side in local football. TSV for the first time moved up into the higher levels of Hesse football in 1997 when it won promotion to the tier five Landesliga Hessen-Nord, rebranded the Verbandsliga in 2009.

Lehnerz would play the next sixteen seasons at this level, generally achieving good results and finishing in the upper half of the table. It finished runners-up in 2007 and, again in 2012 but failed to win promotion on each occasion. The 2012–13 season proved to be the most successful for the club, winning its Verbandsliga division and thereby direct promotion to the tier five Hessenliga.

In its first season in the Hessenliga the club finished in fourth place. In 2014–15 the club finished runners-up in the league and thereby earned the right to take part in the promotion round to the Regionalliga Südwest. After two draws the club missed out on promotion with Bahlinger SC promoted instead.

In April 2018, TSV acquired the men's first team of Borussia Fulda, which resigned from the Hessenliga, but remained as an association and continued to provide youth teams. The club was renamed SG Barockstadt Fulda-Lehnerz and received a new logo and new club colours. With the addition of the name Barockstadt, the connection to the city of Fulda has been emphasised. On 1 July, all these became official.

== Honours ==
The club's honours:

- Verbandsliga Hessen-Nord
  - Champions: 2013
  - Runners-up: 2007, 2012
- Bezirksoberliga Fulda
  - Champions: 1997

== Players ==
As of 8 September 2026

Note: Flags indicate national team as defined under FIFA eligibility rules; some limited exceptions apply. Players may hold more than one non-FIFA nationality.

No.	Pos.	Nation	Player
1	GK	GER	Maximilian Weisbäcker
2	DF	ALB	Arlind Iljazi
4	DF	GER	Milian Habermehl
5	DF	GER	Axel Furkert
6	MF	GER	Lennox Erb
8	MF	GER	Leon Pomnitz
9	FW	GER	Moritz Reinhard
10	MF	GER	Nicolas Wähling
11	MF	GER	Tobias Göbel
14	MF	GHA	Hans Nunoo Sarpei
16	FW	CGO	Jordy Balu
17	MF	GER	Felix Hahn
18	FW	GER	Moritz Dittmann

No.	Pos.	Nation	Player
19	MF	GER	Ali Hüseyin Gün
20	DF	GER	Kevin Hillmann
21	DF	GER	Aaron Frey
22	DF	GER	Sebastian Schmitt
23	DF	KOS	Drini Miftari
29	FW	GER	Emmanuel Elekwa (on loan from Alemannia Aachen)
31	GK	GER	Dimitrios Diamantidis
32	DF	GER	Keanu Kraft
33	GK	GER	Jannik Horz
34	MF	KOS	Diamant Lokaj
37	FW	GER	Luis Klein
77	MF	CRO	Roko Ivanković

=== Out on loan ===
Note: Flags indicate national team as defined under FIFA eligibility rules; some limited exceptions apply. Players may hold more than one non-FIFA nationality.

No.	Pos.	Nation	Player
17	MF	GER	Max Lindemann (at Hünfelder SV until 30 June 2026)

== Recent seasons ==
The recent season-by-season performance of the club:

Season	Division	Tier	Position
1999–2000	Landesliga Hessen-Nord	V	9th
2000–01	Landesliga Hessen-Nord	V	5th
2001–02	Landesliga Hessen-Nord	V	8th
2002–03	Landesliga Hessen-Nord	V	4th
2003–04	Landesliga Hessen-Nord	V	6th
2004–05	Landesliga Hessen-Nord	V	3rd
2005–06	Landesliga Hessen-Nord	V	8th
2006–07	Landesliga Hessen-Nord	V	2nd
2007–08	Landesliga Hessen-Nord	V	5th
2008–09	Verbandsliga Hessen-Nord	VI	7th
2009–10	Verbandsliga Hessen-Nord	VI	3rd
2010–11	Verbandsliga Hessen-Nord	VI	6th
2011–12	Verbandsliga Hessen-Nord	VI	2nd
2012–13	Verbandsliga Hessen-Nord	VI	1st ↑
2013–14	Hessenliga	V	4th
2014–15	Hessenliga	V	2nd
2015–16	Hessenliga	V	3rd
2016–17	Hessenliga	V	7th
2017–18	Hessenliga	V	3rd
2018–19	Hessenliga	V	5th
2019–20	Hessenliga	V	4th
2020–21	Hessenliga	V	1st
2021–22	Hessenliga	V	1st ↑
2022–23	Regionalliga Südwest	IV	11th
2023–24	Regionalliga Südwest	IV	7th
2024–25	Regionalliga Südwest	IV	10th
2025–26	Regionalliga Südwest	10th	

- With the introduction of the Regionalligas in 1994 and the 3. Liga in 2008 as the new third tier, below the 2. Bundesliga, all leagues below dropped one tier.

=== Key ===
↑ Promoted	↓ Relegated
