= FSC Lohfelden =

German football club

- Full name: 1. Fussball Sport-Club Lohfelden 1924 e.V.
- Founded: 1924
- Ground: Nordhessenstadion
- Capacity: 7,000
- Manager: Goce Malinov
- League: Kreisliga A Kassel (X)
- 2018–19: Hessenliga (V), 12th (withdrawn)
Home colours	Away colours

FSC Lohfelden is a German association football club based in Lohfelden, Hesse.

== History ==
It was established in 1895 as the gymnastics and sports club Turn- und Sportverein Crumbach and formed a football department in 1924. In 1933, the association was joined by the membership of the worker's sports club Arbeiter Turn- und Sportverein 1892 Ochshausen which, like other left-leaning workers groups, was dissolved for political reasons under the Nazi regime.

Following World War II occupying Allied authorities ordered the dissolution of all organizations in the country, including sports and football clubs. The membership of TSV became part of the newly formed Freie Sport- und Kulturgemeinde Lohfelden which was created on 14 October 1945. Later, in 1946, the former footballers of TSV Crumbach established themselves as 1. FSC in der FSK Lohfelden.

The team took part in lower-level local competition until advancing to the Landesliga Hessen Nord in 1968. FSC was immediately relegated but returned to Landesliga play in 1971 and played at that level over most of the next two decades. They were first promoted to the Oberliga Hessen (IV) in 1993 and competed there until relegated in 2001. Their best result during this period was a fifth-place finish in 2000. FSC returned to the Oberliga for a single season turn in 2002–03 and were most recently promoted in 2007 and, again, in 2011. The first team withdrew from the Oberliga in 2019 for financial reasons, opting to enter the Kreisliga A Kassel (X) instead.

Since 1959 1. FSC has played its home matches in the Nordhessenstadion which has a capacity of 3,500.

== Honours ==
The club's honours:

- Verbandsliga Hessen-Nord (V)
  - Champions: 1992, 2007, 2011
  - Runners-up: 2002

== Recent seasons ==
The recent season-by-season performance of the club:

Season	Division	Tier	Position
1999–2000	Oberliga Hessen	IV	5th
2000–01	Oberliga Hessen	IV	16th ↓
2001–02	Landesliga Hessen-Nord	V	2nd ↑
2002–03	Oberliga Hessen	IV	17th ↓
2003–04	Landesliga Hessen-Nord	V	3rd
2004–05	Landesliga Hessen-Nord	V	4th
2005–06	Landesliga Hessen-Nord	V	3rd
2006–07	Landesliga Hessen-Nord	V	1st ↑
2007–08	Oberliga Hessen	IV	13th
2008–09	Hessenliga	V	19th ↓
2009–10	Verbandsliga Hessen-Nord	VI	14th
2010–11	Verbandsliga Hessen-Nord	VI	1st ↑
2011–12	Hessenliga	V	9th
2012–13	Hessenliga	V	6th
2013–14	Hessenliga	V	12th
2014–15	Hessenliga	V	12th
2015–16	Hessenliga	V	5th
2016–17	Hessenliga	V	11th
2017–18	Hessenliga	V	9th
2018–19	Hessenliga	V	12th ↓
2019–20	Kreisliga A Kassel 1	X	

- With the introduction of the Regionalligas in 1994 and the 3. Liga in 2008 as the new third tier, below the 2. Bundesliga, all leagues below dropped one tier. Also in 2008, a large number of football leagues in Hesse were renamed, with the Oberliga Hessen becoming the Hessenliga, the Landesliga becoming the Verbandsliga, the Bezirksoberliga becoming the Gruppenliga and the Bezirksliga becoming the Kreisoberliga.

↑ Promoted	↓ Relegated
