= 1. FC Schwalmstadt =

German football club

- Full name: 1. Fußball Club Schwalmstadt
- Founded: 3 April 2003
- Ground: Schwalm-Stadion, Treysa; Stadion am Fünften, Ziegenhain
- Capacity: 5,000
- League: Verbandsliga Hessen-Nord (VI)
- 2015–16: 2nd
Home colours	Away colours

1. FC Schwalmstadt is a German association football club from the city of Schwalmstadt, Hesse which was established in 1970 through the amalgamation of the towns of Treysa and Ziegenhain together with some smaller outlying villages.

== History ==
The recently formed club was created in 2003 out of the merger of the football departments of SV Jahn 1871 Treysa and TuSpo 1886 Ziegenhain. The team has enjoyed some early success, advancing to the Oberliga Hessen (IV) in its second season of play after capturing the championship of the Landesliga Hessen-Nord (V). The A-youth side also plays at the Oberliga level of its age class.

Predecessor side TuSpo Ziegenhain was established in 1886 as Turnverein Ziegenhain. In 1951 the club merged with Sportverein Rot-Weiß Ziegenhain to form Turn- und Sportverein Ziegenhain. The team won promotion to the Oberliga Hessen (IV) in 1979. They narrowly avoided relegation after a 15th-place finish in 1985 by defeating RSV Würges 1:0 in playoff, but were sent down in 1988 after finishing 17th. TuSpo made a first round DFB-Pokal (German Cup) appearance in 1982.

1. FC uses the grounds of both its parent associations to stage its home matches; the Schwalm-Stadion in Treysa and the Stadion am Fünften in Ziegenhain.

The club twice played in the Hessenliga, for four seasons from 2004 to 2008 and again, for two seasons, from 2009 to 2011. From the 2011–12 season, it played in the Verbandsliga once more until 2014, when it earned promotion back to the Hessenliga. It played in the Hessenliga in 2014–15, finished last in the league and was relegated again.

== Honours ==
The club's honours:

=== League ===
- Landesliga Hessen-Nord (V)
  - Champions: 1979 (TuSpo), 2004, 2009
- Verbandsliga Hessen-Nord (VI)
  - Champions: 2014

=== Cup ===
- Hesse Cup
  - Winners: 1981
