= 2023–24 Eintracht Frankfurt season =

Eintracht Frankfurt
2023–24 season
- President: Peter Fischer (until 5 February); Mathias Beck (since 5 February)
- Chairmen: Markus Krösche; Axel Hellmann; Oliver Frankenbach; Philipp Reschke
- Head coach: Dino Toppmöller
- Bundesliga: 6th
- DFB-Pokal: Round of 16
- UEFA Europa Conference League: Knockout round play-offs
- Top goalscorer: League: Omar Marmoush (12); All: Omar Marmoush (17)
- Highest home attendance: 58,000, 9 December 2023 v Bayern Munich (league)
- Lowest home attendance: 46,000, 31 August 2023 v Levski Sofia (Europa Conference League)
- Average home league attendance: 56,959 (league only)
Home colours	Away colours	Third colours

The 2023–24 season was the 124th season in the history of Eintracht Frankfurt, a football club based in Frankfurt, Germany. In addition to the domestic league, Eintracht Frankfurt also participated in this season's edition of the domestic cup, the DFB-Pokal, and the UEFA Europa Conference League. This was the 99th season for Frankfurt in the Deutsche Bank Park, located in Frankfurt, Hesse, Germany. The season covers a period from 1 July 2023 to 30 June 2024.

== Players ==
=== Squad ===
As of 1 February 2024

Note: Flags indicate national team as defined under FIFA eligibility rules; some limited exceptions apply. Players may hold more than one non-FIFA nationality.

No.	Pos.	Nation	Player
1	GK	GER	Kevin Trapp (vice-captain)
3	DF	ECU	Willian Pacho
4	DF	GER	Robin Koch (on loan from Leeds United)
5	DF	CRO	Hrvoje Smolčić
7	FW	EGY	Omar Marmoush
8	MF	ALG	Farès Chaïbi
9	FW	AUT	Saša Kalajdžić (on loan from Wolverhampton Wanderers)
11	FW	FRA	Hugo Ekitike (on loan from Paris Saint-Germain)
15	MF	TUN	Ellyes Skhiri
16	MF	SWE	Hugo Larsson
17	MF	GER	Sebastian Rode (captain)
19	FW	FRA	Jean-Mattéo Bahoya
20	MF	JPN	Makoto Hasebe
22	DF	USA	Timothy Chandler
24	DF	POR	Aurélio Buta
25	MF	NED	Donny van de Beek (on loan from Manchester United)
26	MF	FRA	Éric Junior Dina Ebimbe
27	FW	GER	Mario Götze
29	DF	FRA	Niels Nkounkou

No.	Pos.	Nation	Player
31	DF	GER	Philipp Max
33	GK	GER	Jens Grahl
34	DF	GER	Nnamdi Collins
35	DF	BRA	Tuta
36	MF	GER	Ansgar Knauff
37	MF	GER	Sidney Raebiger
40	GK	BRA	Kauã Santos
41	GK	ALB	Simon Simoni
43	FW	GER	Noel Futkeu
44	DF	ECU	Davis Bautista
45	MF	GER	Mehdi Loune
46	DF	GER	Dario Gebuhr
47	DF	GER	Elias Baum
48	FW	ESP	Nacho Ferri
49	MF	GER	Harpreet Ghotra

=== Players out on loan ===
Note: Flags indicate national team as defined under FIFA eligibility rules; some limited exceptions apply. Players may hold more than one non-FIFA nationality.

No.	Pos.	Nation	Player
—	MF	USA	Paxten Aaronson (at (Netherlands) Vitesse until 30 June 2024)
—	FW	GER	Faride Alidou (at (Germany) 1. FC Köln until 30 June 2024)
—	DF	GER	Nathaniel Brown (at (Germany) 1. FC Nürnberg until 30 June 2024)
—	MF	CYP	Antonio Foti (at (Germany) Hannover 96 until 30 June 2024)
—	FW	NOR	Jens Petter Hauge (at (Norway) FK Bodø/Glimt until 31 December 2024)

No.	Pos.	Nation	Player
—	MF	CRO	Kristijan Jakić (at (Germany) FC Augsburg until 30 June 2024)
—	FW	CRO	Igor Matanović (at (Germany) Karlsruher SC until 30 June 2024)
—	FW	GER	Jessic Ngankam (at (Germany) Mainz 05 until 30 June 2024)
—	DF	CMR	Jérôme Onguéné (at (Switzerland) Servette until 30 June 2024)
—	MF	GER	Marcel Wenig (at (Germany) 1. FC Nürnberg until 30 June 2024)

== Transfers ==
=== In ===
No.	Pos.	Player	Transferred from	Fee	Date	Source
37	FW	(Germany) Ragnar Ache	(Germany) Greuther Fürth	Loan return	1 July 2023	
38	FW	(Turkey) Ali Akman	(Turkey) Göztepe	Loan return	1 July 2023	
23	MF	(Norway) Jens Petter Hauge	(Belgium) Gent	Loan return	1 July 2023	
39	DF	(Cameroon) Jérôme Onguéné	(Austria) Red Bull Salzburg	Loan return	1 July 2023	
42	FW	(Croatia) Igor Matanović	(Germany) FC St. Pauli	Loan return	1 July 2023	
3	DF	(Ecuador) Willian Pacho	(Belgium) Antwerp	€9M	1 July 2023	
7	FW	(Egypt) Omar Marmoush	(Germany) VfL Wolfsburg	Free transfer	1 July 2023	
31	DF	(Germany) Philipp Max	(Netherlands) PSV Eindhoven	€1.9M	1 July 2023	
26	MF	(France) Éric Junior Dina Ebimbe	(France) Paris Saint-Germain	€6.5M	1 July 2023	
16	MF	(Sweden) Hugo Larsson	(Sweden) Malmö FF	€7.5M	1 July 2023	
36	MF	(Germany) Ansgar Knauff	(Germany) Borussia Dortmund	€5M	1 July 2023	
44	DF	(Ecuador) Davis Bautista	(Ecuador) SD Aucas	Undisclosed	1 July 2023	
15	MF	(Tunisia) Ellyes Skhiri	(Germany) 1. FC Köln	Free transfer	5 July 2023	
4	DF	(Germany) Robin Koch	(England) Leeds United	Loan	6 July 2023	
18	FW	(Germany) Jessic Ngankam	(Germany) Hertha BSC	Free transfer	14 July 2023	
34	DF	(Germany) Nnamdi Collins	(Germany) Borussia Dortmund II	€1M	9 August 2023	
40	GK	(Brazil) Kauã Santos	(Brazil) Flamengo	€1.6M	29 August 2023	
8	MF	(Algeria) Farès Chaïbi	(France) Toulouse	€10M	30 August 2023	
29	DF	(France) Niels Nkounkou	(France) Saint-Étienne	€7.5M	1 September 2023	
37	MF	(Germany) Sidney Raebiger	(Germany) Greuther Fürth	€50,000	1 September 2023	
25	MF	(Netherlands) Donny van de Beek	(England) Manchester United	Loan	1 January 2024	
	DF	(Germany) Nathaniel Brown	(Germany) 1. FC Nürnberg	€3M	3 January 2024	
9	FW	(Austria) Saša Kalajdžić	(England) Wolverhampton Wanderers	Loan	7 January 2024	
19	FW	(France) Jean-Mattéo Bahoya	(France) Angers	€8M	24 January 2024	
11	FW	(France) Hugo Ekitike	(France) Paris Saint-Germain	Loan	1 February 2024	
32	MF	(Serbia) Marko Mladenović	(Germany) Eintracht Frankfurt academy	Free	12 April 2024	

=== Out ===
No.	Pos.	Player	Transferred to	Fee	Date	Source
26	MF	(France) Éric Junior Dina Ebimbe	(France) Paris Saint-Germain	Loan return	1 July 2023	
36	MF	(Germany) Ansgar Knauff	(Germany) Borussia Dortmund	Loan return	1 July 2023	
32	DF	(Germany) Philipp Max	(Netherlands) PSV Eindhoven	Loan return	1 July 2023	
18	DF	(Mali) Almamy Touré	(Germany) 1. FC Kaiserslautern	Free transfer	1 July 2023	
2	DF	(Ivory Coast) Evan Ndicka	(Italy) Roma	Free transfer	1 July 2023	
15	MF	(Japan) Daichi Kamada	(Italy) Lazio	Free transfer	1 July 2023	
49	DF	(Germany) Jan Schröder	(United States) Delaware Fightin' Blue Hens	Free transfer	1 July 2023	
37	FW	(Germany) Ragnar Ache	(Germany) 1. FC Kaiserslautern	€1M	25 July 2023	
40	GK	(Germany) Diant Ramaj	(Netherlands) Ajax	€5M	3 August 2023	
8	MF	(Switzerland) Djibril Sow	(Spain) Sevilla	€10M	4 August 2023	
39	DF	(Cameroon) Jérôme Onguéné	(Switzerland) Servette	Loan	4 August 2023	
38	FW	(Turkey) Ali Akman	(Belgium) Dender EH	Free transfer	10 August 2023	
42	FW	(Croatia) Igor Matanović	(Germany) Karlsruher SC	Loan	17 August 2023	
11	FW	(Germany) Faride Alidou	(Germany) 1. FC Köln	Loan	21 August 2023	
29	MF	(Denmark) Jesper Lindstrøm	(Italy) Napoli	€30M	29 August 2023	
25	DF	(Germany) Christopher Lenz	(Germany) RB Leipzig	€1M	30 August 2023	
19	FW	(Colombia) Rafael Santos Borré	(Germany) Werder Bremen	Loan	1 September 2023	
9	FW	(France) Randal Kolo Muani	(France) Paris Saint-Germain	€95M	1 September 2023	
	DF	(Germany) Nathaniel Brown	(Germany) 1. FC Nürnberg	Loan	3 January 2024	
21	FW	(Argentina) Lucas Alario	(Brazil) Internacional	€500,000	5 January 2024	
28	MF	(Germany) Marcel Wenig	(Germany) 1. FC Nürnberg	Loan	8 January 2024	
6	MF	(Croatia) Kristijan Jakić	(Germany) FC Augsburg	Loan	19 January 2024	
23	MF	(Norway) Jens Petter Hauge	(Norway) FK Bodø/Glimt	Loan	31 January 2024	
18	FW	(Germany) Jessic Ngankam	(Germany) Mainz 05	Loan	1 February 2024	
30	MF	(United States) Paxten Aaronson	(Netherlands) Vitesse	Loan	1 February 2024	
19	FW	(Colombia) Rafael Santos Borré	(Brazil) Internacional	€6.5M	2 March 2024	

== Friendly matches ==
Win Draw Loss

15 July 2023	FSV Braunfels (Germany)	1–15	(Germany) Eintracht Frankfurt	Wetzlar, Germany
15:30 CEST (UTC+2)	Luciani 34'	Report	Matanović 7', 37'; Hauge 11', 45'; Chandler 15'; Aaronson 54', 66', 79', 88'; Ache 59', 84'; Skhiri 62'; Dina Ebimbe 71', 90+1'; Lenz 75' (pen.)	Stadium: Stadion Wetzlar; Attendance: 6,500

18 July 2023	TSV Steinbach Haiger (Germany)	2–1	(Germany) Eintracht Frankfurt	Haiger, Germany
18:30 CEST (UTC+2)	Fırat 33'; Gudra (yellow card) 54'; Korte 73'; Galle (yellow card) 85'	Report	Rode (yellow card) 24'; Matanović 36'	Stadium: SIBRE-Sportzentrum Haarwasen; Attendance: 4,990

22 July 2023	SG Barockstadt Fulda-Lehnerz (Germany)	3–2	(Germany) Eintracht Frankfurt	Fulda, Germany
15:30 CEST (UTC+2)	Reinhard 7'; Grobelnik 28', 39'	Report	Ngankam (penalty missed) 48'; Hauge 48'; Matanović 67'	Stadium: Sportpark Johannisau; Attendance: 4,896

28 July 2023	Eintracht Frankfurt (Germany)	1–1	(Netherlands) Vitesse	Grödig, Austria
14:30 CEST (UTC+2)	Hauge 43'	Report	Wittek 56'	Stadium: Untersberg-Arena

5 August 2023	Eintracht Frankfurt (Germany)	0–0	(England) Nottingham Forest	Frankfurt, Germany
15:30 CEST (UTC+2)		Report		Stadium: Deutsche Bank Park; Attendance: 31,000; Referee: Martin Petersen (Germany)

7 September 2023	Eintracht Frankfurt (Germany)	3–1	(Germany) SV Wehen Wiesbaden	Frankfurt, Germany
15:00 CEST (UTC+2)	Aaronson 43'; Ngankam 62' (pen.); Hauge 83'	Report	Jonjić 17'	Stadium: Deutsche Bank Park training pitch Attendance: 0
Note: The match was played behind closed doors.

13 October 2023	BSG Chemie Leipzig (Germany)	2–1	(Germany) Eintracht Frankfurt	Leipzig, Germany
19:30 CEST (UTC+2)	Kirstein 47'; Mauer 54'	Report	Futkeu 83'	Stadium: Alfred-Kunze-Sportpark; Attendance: 4,999
Note: The match was played behind closed doors.

6 January 2024	Eintracht Frankfurt (Germany)	2–5	(Germany) SC Freiburg	Frankfurt, Germany
13:00 CET (UTC+1)	Koch 24'; Buta 76'	Report	Sallai 29', 48'; Röhl 34'; Gregoritsch 55'; Grifo 64' (pen.)	Stadium: Deutsche Bank Park; Attendance: 0 Referee: Christian Ballweg
Note: The match was played behind closed doors.

21 May 2024	FC Alsbach (Germany)	0–11	(Germany) Eintracht Frankfurt	Alsbach-Hähnlein, Germany
18:00 CEST (UTC+2)		Report	Skhiri 7'; Knauff 10'; Bahoya 27'; Buta 53'; Ferri 55'; (o.g.); Alaoui 64', 86', 87'; Chandler 71'; Chaïbi 78'	Attendance: 3,900

22 May 2024	VfL Germania 1894 (Germany)	1–13	(Germany) Eintracht Frankfurt	Dreieich, Germany
18:00 CEST (UTC+2)	Tomić 76'	Report	Ferri 2'; Chaïbi 6', 21'; Tuta 9'; Max 19', 36'; Bahoya 22', 25', 57'; Trapp 50', 82'; Chandler 63'; Rode 90'	Stadium: Sportpark Dreieich; Attendance: 1,600

== Competitions ==
Win Draw Loss

=== Overall record ===
Competition	First match	Last match	Starting round	Final position	Record							
Competition	First match	Last match	Starting round	Final position	Pld	W	D	L	GF	GA	GD	Win %
Bundesliga	20 August 2023	18 May 2024	Matchday 1	6th	34	11	14	9	51	50	+1	32.35
DFB-Pokal	13 August 2023	6 December 2023	First round	Round of 16	3	2	0	1	9	2	+7	66.67
UEFA Europa Conference League	24 August 2023	22 February 2024	Play-off round	Knockout round play-offs	10	4	2	4	17	12	+5	40.00
Total					47	17	16	14	77	64	+13	36.17

Source: Soccerway

=== Bundesliga ===
==== League table ====
Pos	Team	Pld	W	D	L	GF	GA	GD	Pts	Qualification or relegation
4	RB Leipzig	34	19	8	7	77	39	+38	65	Qualification for the Champions League league phase (Note: The Bundesliga gained an additional Champions League place as a result of Germany finishing as one of the two associations with the highest UEFA coefficient points in 2023–24.)
5	Borussia Dortmund	34	18	9	7	68	43	+25	63	Qualification for the Champions League league phase
6	Eintracht Frankfurt	34	11	14	9	51	50	+1	47	Qualification for the Europa League league phase (Note: Since the 2023–24 DFB-Pokal winners, Bayer Leverkusen, qualified for the Champions League via league position, the spot reserved for the DFB-Pokal winners (Europa League league phase) was passed to the seventh-placed team, and the Conference League play-off round spot was passed to the eighth-placed team.)
7	TSG Hoffenheim	34	13	7	14	66	66	0	46	Qualification for the Europa League league phase
8	1. FC Heidenheim	34	10	12	12	50	55	−5	42	Qualification for the Conference League play-off round

Source: DFB
Rules for classification: 1) Points; 2) Goal difference; 3) Goals scored; 4) Head-to-head results; 5) Head-to-head away goals scored; 6) Away goals scored; 7) Play-off.

==== Results summary ====
Overall								Home						Away					
Pld	W	D	L	GF	GA	GD	Pts	W	D	L	GF	GA	GD	W	D	L	GF	GA	GD
34	11	14	9	51	50	+1	47	7	8	2	29	21	+8	4	6	7	22	29	−7

Source: Bundesliga

==== Results by round ====
Round	1	2	3	4	5	6	7	8	9	10	11	12	13	14	15	16	17	18	19	20	21	22	23	24	25	26	27	28	29	30	31	32	33	34
Ground	H	A	H	A	H	A	H	A	H	A	A	H	A	H	A	H	A	A	H	A	H	A	H	A	H	A	H	H	A	H	A	H	A	H
Result	W	D	D	D	D	L	W	W	D	W	D	L	L	W	L	W	W	D	W	L	D	D	D	W	W	L	D	D	L	W	L	L	D	D
Position	7	6	10	9	8	9	8	7	7	7	7	7	7	7	8	6	6	6	6	6	6	6	6	6	6	6	6	6	6	6	6	6	6	6

Source: DFB
A = Away; H = Home; W = Win; D = Draw; L = Loss

==== Matches ====
20 August 2023 1	Eintracht Frankfurt	1–0	Darmstadt 98	Frankfurt
17:30 CEST (UTC+2)	Kolo Muani 40'; Jakić (yellow card) 59'; Koch (yellow card) 90+6'	Report	Klarer (yellow card) 37'; Mehlem (yellow card) 45+1'; Maglica (yellow card) 74'	Stadium: Deutsche Bank Park; Attendance: 54,000; Referee: Harm Osmers

27 August 2023 2	Mainz 05	1–1	Eintracht Frankfurt	Mainz
15:30 CEST (UTC+2)	Lee 25'; Fernandes (yellow card) 55'; Kohr (yellow card) 75'; Van den Berg (yellow card) 86'	Report	Koch (yellow card) 32'; Knauff (yellow card) 49' (yellow-red card) 61'; Marmoush 90+1', (yellow card) 90+2'	Stadium: Mewa Arena; Attendance: 33,305; Referee: Bastian Dankert

3 September 2023 3	Eintracht Frankfurt	1–1	1. FC Köln	Frankfurt
15:30 CEST (UTC+2)	Marmoush (yellow card) 64'; Nkounkou 87'	Report	Kainz 43' (pen.); Ljubičić (yellow card) 45+1'; Martel (yellow card) 45+3'; Schmitz (yellow card) 70'	Stadium: Deutsche Bank Park; Attendance: 54,000; Referee: Florian Badstübner

16 September 2023 4	VfL Bochum	1–1	Eintracht Frankfurt	Bochum
18:30 CEST (UTC+2)	Stöger (yellow card) 70', (goal) 74' (pen.); Ordets (yellow card) 80'; Mašović (yellow card) 90+4'	Report	Dina Ebimbe 55'; Marmoush (yellow card) 73'; Götze (yellow card) 76'	Stadium: Ruhrstadion; Attendance: 26,000; Referee: Benjamin Brand

24 September 2023 5	Eintracht Frankfurt	0–0	SC Freiburg	Frankfurt
17:30 CEST (UTC+2)	Dina Ebimbe (yellow card) 45+2'; Pacho (yellow card) 52'; Koch (yellow card) 86'; Trapp (yellow card) 86'	Report	Ginter (yellow card) 33'; Eggestein (yellow card) 86'	Stadium: Deutsche Bank Park; Attendance: 55,800; Referee: Felix Zwayer

30 September 2023 6	VfL Wolfsburg	2–0	Eintracht Frankfurt	Wolfsburg
15:30 CEST (UTC+2)	Wind 31', 84', (penalty missed) 84'; Zesiger (yellow card) 73'	Report	Pacho (yellow card) 5'; Götze (yellow card) 42' (yellow-red card) 58'; Buta (yellow card) 45+2'; Knauff (yellow card) 89'; Ngankam (yellow card) 90+4'	Stadium: Volkswagen Arena; Attendance: 28,323; Referee: Frank Willenborg

8 October 2023 7	Eintracht Frankfurt	2–0	1. FC Heidenheim	Frankfurt
19:30 CEST (UTC+2)	Ngankam (yellow card) 11', (penalty missed) 30'; Larsson 39'; Max (yellow card) 65'; Knauff 72'	Report	Beste (yellow card) 23'; Müller (yellow card) 28'; Mainka (yellow card) 46'	Stadium: Deutsche Bank Park; Attendance: 55,800; Referee: Daniel Schlager

21 October 2023 8	1899 Hoffenheim	1–3	Eintracht Frankfurt	Sinsheim
15:30 CEST (UTC+2)	Beier 3'; Grillitsch (yellow card) 41'; Prömel (yellow card) 51'; Szalai (yellow card) 60'	Report	Marmoush 11'; Knauff 23'; Skhiri 45+3'	Stadium: Rhein-Neckar-Arena; Attendance: 30,150; Referee: Matthias Jöllenbeck

29 October 2023 9	Eintracht Frankfurt	3–3	Borussia Dortmund	Frankfurt
15:30 CET (UTC+1)	Marmoush 8' (pen.), 24', (yellow card) 42'; Buta (yellow card) 45+8'; Pacho (yellow card) 52'; Chaïbi 68'	Report	Özcan (yellow card) 11'; Sabitzer 45+1'; Moukoko 54'; Adeyemi (yellow card) 76'; Brandt 82'	Stadium: Deutsche Bank Park; Attendance: 56,500; Referee: Robert Schröder

4 November 2023 10	Union Berlin	0–3	Eintracht Frankfurt	Berlin
15:30 CET (UTC+1)		Report	Marmoush 2', 14'; Koch (yellow card) 29'; Ferri 82'	Stadium: Stadion An der Alten Försterei; Attendance: 22,012; Referee: Sven Jablonski

12 November 2023 11	Werder Bremen	2–2	Eintracht Frankfurt	Bremen
17:30 CET (UTC+1)	Ducksch 45+2' (pen.); Jung (yellow card) 46'; Borré 50'	Report	Chaïbi (yellow card) 25'; Max (yellow card) 37'; Knauff (yellow card) 45+1'; Skhiri 65'; Smolčić 75'	Stadium: Weserstadion; Attendance: 42,100; Referee: Benjamin Brand

25 November 2023 12	Eintracht Frankfurt	1–2	VfB Stuttgart	Frankfurt
18:30 CET (UTC+1)	Anton 26' (o.g.)	Report	Undav 1', 45+1'; Mittelstädt (yellow card) 90+5'	Stadium: Deutsche Bank Park; Attendance: 58,000; Referee: Felix Brych

3 December 2023 13	FC Augsburg	2–1	Eintracht Frankfurt	Augsburg
19:30 CET (UTC+1)	Jensen 35'; Iago 58'; Valentin (yellow card) 73'; Demirović (penalty missed) 76'	Report	Buta (yellow card) 27'; Dahmen 78' (o.g.)	Stadium: Augsburg Arena; Attendance: 26,107; Referee: Harm Osmers

9 December 2023 14	Eintracht Frankfurt	5–1	Bayern Munich	Frankfurt
15:30 CET (UTC+1)	Marmoush 12', (yellow card) 67'; Dina Ebimbe 31', 50'; Larsson 36'; Knauff 60'	Report	Kim (yellow card) 24'; Kimmich 44'; Sané (yellow card) 71'	Stadium: Deutsche Bank Park; Attendance: 58,000; Referee: Felix Zwayer

17 December 2023 15	Bayer Leverkusen	3–0	Eintracht Frankfurt	Leverkusen
17:30 CET (UTC+1)	Palacios (yellow card) 12'; Boniface 14'; Frimpong 51'; Wirtz 57'	Report	Götze (yellow card) 33'; Pacho (yellow card) 90+4'	Stadium: BayArena; Attendance: 30,210; Referee: Christian Dingert

20 December 2023 16	Eintracht Frankfurt	2–1	Borussia Mönchengladbach	Frankfurt
20:30 CET (UTC+1)	Pacho (yellow card) 71'; Buta 90+2'; Koch 90+7'; Buck (yellow card) 90+7'	Report	Wöber 27', (yellow card) 69' (yellow-red card) 88'; Elvedi (yellow card) 35'; Koné (yellow card) 49'; Scally (yellow card) 79'; Nicolas (yellow card) 90+6'	Stadium: Deutsche Bank Park; Attendance: 58,000; Referee: Florian Badstübner

13 January 2024 17	RB Leipzig	0–1	Eintracht Frankfurt	Leipzig
15:30 CET (UTC+1)		Report	Knauff 7'; Dina Ebimbe (yellow card) 41'; Larsson (yellow card) 90+4'	Stadium: Red Bull Arena; Attendance: 45,867; Referee: Frank Willenborg

20 January 2024 18	Darmstadt 98	2–2	Eintracht Frankfurt	Darmstadt
15:30 CET (UTC+1)	Maglica (yellow card) 20'; Justvan 61'; Vilhelmsson 90+5'	Report	Nkounkou 33'; Knauff 51'; Buta (yellow card) 68'	Stadium: Merck-Stadion am Böllenfalltor; Attendance: 17,750; Referee: Daniel Siebert

26 January 2024 19	Eintracht Frankfurt	1–0	Mainz 05	Frankfurt
20:30 CET (UTC+1)	Pacho (yellow card) 24'; Nkounkou (yellow card) 34'; Götze 73'	Report	Widmer (yellow card) 40'	Stadium: Deutsche Bank Park; Attendance: 58,000; Referee: Felix Zwayer

3 February 2024 20	1. FC Köln	2–0	Eintracht Frankfurt	Cologne
18:30 CET (UTC+1)	Huseinbašić (yellow card) 19'; Alidou 68'; Thielmann 80'	Report	Tuta (yellow card) 34' (yellow-red card) 83'; Nkounkou (yellow card) 55' (yellow-red card) 66'	Stadium: RheinEnergieStadion; Attendance: 50,000; Referee: Timo Gerach

10 February 2024 21	Eintracht Frankfurt	1–1	VfL Bochum	Frankfurt
15:30 CET (UTC+1)	Marmoush 14'; Pacho (yellow card) 53'; Koch (yellow card) 80'	Report	Broschinski 17'; Oermann (yellow card) 35'; Bero (yellow card) 90+2'	Stadium: Deutsche Bank Park; Attendance: 57,500; Referee: Sven Jablonski

18 February 2024 22	SC Freiburg	3–3	Eintracht Frankfurt	Freiburg
15:30 CET (UTC+1)	Dōan 30'; Grifo 45+5' (pen.); Gregoritsch 90'	Report	Marmoush 27'; Knauff 35', 72'	Stadium: Europa-Park Stadion; Attendance: 34,700; Referee: Tobias Stieler

25 February 2024 23	Eintracht Frankfurt	2–2	VfL Wolfsburg	Frankfurt
15:30 CET (UTC+1)	Max 14'; Ekitike (yellow card) 41'; Dina Ebimbe (yellow card) 44'; Marmoush 90+2'	Report	Lacroix 2'; Behrens 36'; Gerhardt (yellow card) 40'	Stadium: Deutsche Bank Park; Attendance: 56,500; Referee: Daniel Schlager

2 March 2024 24	1. FC Heidenheim	1–2	Eintracht Frankfurt	Heidenheim
15:30 CET (UTC+1)	Pieringer 59'; Dinkçi (yellow card) 62'	Report	Dina Ebimbe (yellow card) 25'; Koch (yellow card) 31'; Gimber 39' (o.g.); Nkounkou 49'; Ekitike (yellow card) 77'; Trapp (yellow card) 86'	Stadium: Voith-Arena; Attendance: 15,000; Referee: Sören Storks

10 March 2024 25	Eintracht Frankfurt	3–1	1899 Hoffenheim	Frankfurt
17:30 CET (UTC+1)	Chaïbi (yellow card) 12'; Koch 32'; Dina Ebimbe 50'; Götze 64'	Report	Brooks 6', (red card) 22'; Kabak (red card) 9'; Akpoguma (yellow card) 57'	Stadium: Deutsche Bank Park; Attendance: 57,000; Referee: Bastian Dankert

17 March 2024 26	Borussia Dortmund	3–1	Eintracht Frankfurt	Dortmund
17:30 CET (UTC+1)	Adeyemi 33'; Hummels 81'; Can (yellow card) 87', (goal) 90+3' (pen.)	Report	Götze 13'; Buta (yellow card) 80'; Koch (yellow card) 90+2'	Stadium: Westfalenstadion; Attendance: 81,365; Referee: Tobias Stieler

30 March 2024 27	Eintracht Frankfurt	0–0	Union Berlin	Frankfurt
15:30 CET (UTC+1)	Ekitike (yellow card) 24'; Nkounkou (yellow card) 38'; Pacho (yellow card) 90'; Buck (yellow card) 90+8'	Report	Leite (yellow card) 61'	Stadium: Deutsche Bank Park; Attendance: 57,100; Referee: Marco Fritz

5 April 2024 28	Eintracht Frankfurt	1–1	Werder Bremen	Frankfurt
20:30 CEST (UTC+2)	Marmoush (yellow card) 24'; Dina Ebimbe (yellow card) 45'; Tuta 77', (yellow card) 83', (red card) 89'	Report	Veljković 62'; Friedl (yellow card) 69'; Stage (red card) 73'; Ducksch (yellow card) 77'	Stadium: Deutsche Bank Park; Attendance: 55,000; Referee: Robert Hartmann

13 April 2024 29	VfB Stuttgart	3–0	Eintracht Frankfurt	Stuttgart
18:30 CEST (UTC+2)	Guirassy 11'; Undav 17'; Leweling 37'; Stiller (yellow card) 74'	Report	Nkounkou (yellow card) 23'; Knauff (yellow card) 25'; Hasebe (yellow card) 50'	Stadium: MHPArena; Attendance: 60,000; Referee: Deniz Aytekin

19 April 2024 30	Eintracht Frankfurt	3–1	FC Augsburg	Frankfurt
20:30 CEST (UTC+2)	Chaïbi 55'; Ekitike 61'; Koch (yellow card) 90'; Knauff (yellow card) 90+3'; Marmoush 90+5', (yellow card) 90+7'	Report	Vargas 13'; Engels (yellow card) 49'; Demirović (yellow card) 65'; Gouweleeuw (yellow card) 67'	Stadium: Deutsche Bank Park; Attendance: 57,600; Referee: Martin Petersen

27 April 2024 31	Bayern Munich	2–1	Eintracht Frankfurt	Munich
15:30 CEST (UTC+2)	Kane 9', 61' (pen.)	Report	Ekitike 23'; Koch (yellow card) 60'; Skhiri (yellow card) 62'; Götze (yellow card) 62'	Stadium: Allianz Arena; Attendance: 75,000; Referee: Daniel Schlager

5 May 2024 32	Eintracht Frankfurt	1–5	Bayer Leverkusen	Frankfurt
17:30 CEST (UTC+2)	Ekitike 32'	Report	Xhaka 12'; Schick 44'; Palacios 58' (pen.); Frimpong 77'; Boniface 89' (pen.)	Stadium: Deutsche Bank Park; Attendance: 58,000; Referee: Christian Dingert

11 May 2024 33	Borussia Mönchengladbach	1–1	Eintracht Frankfurt	Mönchengladbach
15:30 CEST (UTC+2)	Hack 9'; Itakura (yellow card) 25'	Report	Dina Ebimbe 35'	Stadium: Borussia-Park; Attendance: 54,042; Referee: Robert Schröder

18 May 2024 34	Eintracht Frankfurt	2–2	RB Leipzig	Frankfurt
15:30 CEST (UTC+2)	Ekitike 60'; Koch (yellow card) 61'; Marmoush 77' (pen.); Knauff (yellow card) 90+2'	Report	Simons 42' (pen.), (yellow card) 90+2'; Šeško 46'; Henrichs (yellow card) 51'	Stadium: Deutsche Bank Park; Attendance: 57,500; Referee: Felix Zwayer

=== DFB-Pokal ===
13 August 2023 First round	Lokomotive Leipzig	0–7	Eintracht Frankfurt	Leipzig
15:30 CEST (UTC+2)	Sirch (yellow card) 41'; Piplica (yellow card) 65'; Atılgan (yellow card) 67'	Report	Pacho (yellow card) 32'; Kolo Muani 37'; Götze 58'; Marmoush 66'; Dina Ebimbe 71', 89'; Ngankam 74', 85', (yellow card) 80'	Stadium: Bruno-Plache-Stadion; Attendance: 11,100; Referee: Michael Bacher

1 November 2023 Second round	Viktoria Köln	0–2	Eintracht Frankfurt	Cologne
20:45 CET (UTC+1)	Greger (yellow card) 85'	Report	Koch (yellow card) 8'; Skhiri 14', (yellow card) 77'; Knauff 90'	Stadium: Sportpark Höhenberg; Attendance: 8,343; Referee: Max Burda

6 December 2023 Round of 16	1. FC Saarbrücken	2–0	Eintracht Frankfurt	Saarbrücken
18:00 CET (UTC+1)	Brünker 64'; Kerber 78'; Becker (yellow card) 86'	Report	Max (yellow card) 16'; Dina Ebimbe (yellow card) 36'; Futkeu (red card) 83'	Stadium: Ludwigsparkstadion; Attendance: 15,905; Referee: Daniel Siebert

=== UEFA Europa Conference League ===
==== Play-off round ====
The draw for the play-off round was held on 7 August 2023.

24 August 2023 First leg	Levski Sofia (Bulgaria)	1–1	(Germany) Eintracht Frankfurt	Sofia, Bulgaria
19:00 EEST (UTC+3)	Kraev (yellow card) 58'; Córdoba (yellow card) 83'; Tsunami (yellow card) 86'; Fadiga 90+5'	Report	Kolo Muani 6'; Dina Ebimbe (yellow card) 83'	Stadium: Vasil Levski National Stadium; Attendance: 35,000; Referee: Adam Ladebäck (Sweden)

31 August 2023 Second leg	Eintracht Frankfurt (Germany)	2–0 (3–1 agg.)	(Bulgaria) Levski Sofia	Frankfurt, Germany
20:30 CEST (UTC+2)	Buta (yellow card) 38'; Ngankam 79'; Skhiri 86'	Report	Ronaldo (yellow card) 18'; Tsunami (yellow card) 27'; Dimitrov (yellow card) 34'; Van der Kaap (yellow card) 64'	Stadium: Deutsche Bank Park; Attendance: 46,000; Referee: Allard Lindhout (Netherlands)

==== Group stage ====
The draw for the group stage was held on 1 September 2023.

Pos	Team	Pld	W	D	L	GF	GA	GD	Pts	Qualification	PAOK	FRA	ABE	HJK
1	(Greece) PAOK	6	5	1	0	16	10	+6	16	Advance to round of 16	—	2–1	2–2	4–2
2	(Germany) Eintracht Frankfurt	6	3	0	3	11	7	+4	9	Advance to knockout round play-offs	1–2	—	2–1	6–0
3	(Scotland) Aberdeen	6	1	3	2	10	10	0	6		2–3	2–0	—	1–1
4	(Finland) HJK	6	0	2	4	7	17	−10	2		2–3	0–1	2–2	—

Source: UEFA
Rules for classification: Group stage tiebreakers

21 September 2023 1	Eintracht Frankfurt (Germany)	2–1	(Scotland) Aberdeen	Frankfurt, Germany
18:45 CEST (UTC+2)	Marmoush 11' (pen.); Aaronson (yellow card) 25'; Koch 61'	Report	Polvara 22'; Gartenmann (yellow card) 63'	Stadium: Deutsche Bank Park; Attendance: 55,500; Referee: Chrysovalantis Theouli (Cyprus)

5 October 2023 2	PAOK (Greece)	2–1	(Germany) Eintracht Frankfurt	Thessaloniki, Greece
22:00 EEST (UTC+3)	A. Živković 28'; Koulierakis 90+2'; Meïté (yellow card) 90+3', (red card) 90+6'	Report	Nkounkou (yellow card) 43'; Marmoush 68'; Trapp (red card) 90+6'	Stadium: Toumba Stadium; Attendance: 21,549; Referee: Simone Sozza (Italy)

26 October 2023 3	Eintracht Frankfurt (Germany)	6–0	(Finland) HJK	Frankfurt, Germany
21:00 CEST (UTC+2)	Dina Ebimbe 12' (pen.), 89'; Koch 27', (yellow card) 75'; Marmoush 31'; Tuta 45+3'; Skhiri 55'	Report	Tenho (yellow card) 26'; Keskinen (yellow card) 29'; Peltola (yellow card) 42'	Stadium: Deutsche Bank Park; Attendance: 55,500; Referee: Viktor Kopiyevskyi (Ukraine)

9 November 2023 4	HJK (Finland)	0–1	(Germany) Eintracht Frankfurt	Helsinki, Finland
19:45 EET (UTC+2)		Report	Chaïbi 31'; Buta (yellow card) 77'	Stadium: Bolt Arena; Attendance: 10,121; Referee: Pierre Gaillouste (France)

30 November 2023 5	Eintracht Frankfurt (Germany)	1–2	(Greece) PAOK	Frankfurt, Germany
21:00 CET (UTC+1)	Marmoush 58', (yellow card) 81'; Tuta (yellow card) 69'; Jakić (yellow card) 90+2' (yellow-red card) 90+4'	Report	Kędziora 55'; Brandon (yellow card) 69'; Živković 73'	Stadium: Deutsche Bank Park; Attendance: 58,000; Referee: Damian Sylwestrzak (Poland)

14 December 2023 6	Aberdeen (Scotland)	2–0	(Germany) Eintracht Frankfurt	Aberdeen, Scotland
17:45 GMT (UTC+0)	Duk 41'; Sokler 74'	Report	Aaronson (yellow card) 90+1'	Stadium: Pittodrie Stadium; Attendance: 14,474; Referee: Miguel Nogueira (Portugal)

==== Knockout phase ====
===== Knockout round play-offs =====
The draw for the knockout round play-offs was held on 18 December 2023.

15 February 2024 First leg	Union Saint-Gilloise (Belgium)	2–2	(Germany) Eintracht Frankfurt	Brussels, Belgium
18:45 CET (UTC+1)	Burgess (yellow card) 26'; Rasmussen 31'; Vanhoutte (yellow card) 35' (yellow-red card) 78'; Nilsson 68'; Lindner (yellow card) 90+4'	Report	Chaïbi 3', (yellow card) 85'; Tuta (yellow card) 4'; Kalajdžić 10'; Buta (yellow card) 82'	Stadium: Constant Vanden Stock Stadium; Attendance: 9,015; Referee: Craig Pawson (England)
Note: The match was played at the Constant Vanden Stock Stadium in Brussels, instead of Union Saint-Gilloise's regular stadium, the Joseph Marien Stadium, which did not meet UEFA requirements.

22 February 2024 Second leg	Eintracht Frankfurt (Germany)	1–2 (3–4 agg.)	(Belgium) Union Saint-Gilloise	Frankfurt, Germany
21:00 CET (UTC+1)	Buta (yellow card) 20'; Trapp (yellow card) 76'; Chandler (yellow card) 82'; Dina Ebimbe 87', (yellow card) 89'	Report	Puertas 47'; Amoura (yellow card) 76'; Eckert 80'; Machida (yellow card) 87'	Stadium: Deutsche Bank Park; Attendance: 57,300; Referee: Espen Eskås (Norway)

== Statistics ==
=== Appearances and goals ===
No.	Pos	Nat	Player	Total		Bundesliga		DFB-Pokal		Europa Conference League	
No.	Pos	Nat	Player	Apps	Goals	Apps	Goals	Apps	Goals	Apps	Goals
Goalkeepers
1	GK	(Germany) GER	Kevin Trapp	43	0	32	0	2	0	9	0
33	GK	(Germany) GER	Jens Grahl	5	0	2	0	1	0	1+1	0
40	GK	(Brazil) BRA	Kauã Santos	0	0	0	0	0	0	0	0
41	GK	(Albania) ALB	Simon Simoni	0	0	0	0	0	0	0	0
Defenders
3	DF	(Ecuador) ECU	Willian Pacho	44	0	33	0	3	0	8	0
4	DF	(Germany) GER	Robin Koch	42	4	31	2	3	0	8	2
5	DF	(Croatia) CRO	Hrvoje Smolčić	18	1	3+8	1	0+1	0	5+1	0
22	DF	(United States) USA	Timothy Chandler	8	0	0+6	0	0	0	0+2	0
24	DF	(Portugal) POR	Aurélio Buta	41	1	20+10	1	2+1	0	5+3	0
29	DF	(France) FRA	Niels Nkounkou	39	3	13+16	3	2	0	8	0
31	DF	(Germany) GER	Philipp Max	27	1	17+6	1	2	0	0+2	0
34	DF	(Germany) GER	Nnamdi Collins	2	0	1+1	0	0	0	0	0
35	DF	(Brazil) BRA	Tuta	41	1	30	0	1+2	0	7+1	1
44	DF	(Ecuador) ECU	Davis Bautista	0	0	0	0	0	0	0	0
46	DF	(Germany) GER	Dario Gebuhr	0	0	0	0	0	0	0	0
47	DF	(Germany) GER	Elias Baum	6	0	0+4	0	0	0	1+1	0
Midfielders
8	MF	(Algeria) ALG	Farès Chaïbi	37	4	21+7	2	2	0	6+1	2
15	MF	(Tunisia) TUN	Ellyes Skhiri	38	5	24+3	2	2	1	9	2
16	MF	(Sweden) SWE	Hugo Larsson	38	2	21+8	2	1+2	0	4+2	0
17	MF	(Germany) GER	Sebastian Rode	11	0	1+7	0	0	0	1+2	0
20	MF	(Japan) JPN	Makoto Hasebe	14	0	2+6	0	3	0	1+2	0
25	MF	(Netherlands) NED	Donny van de Beek	8	0	4+4	0	0	0	0	0
26	MF	(France) FRA	Éric Junior Dina Ebimbe	44	10	25+6	5	2+1	2	7+3	3
27	MF	(Germany) GER	Mario Götze	41	4	23+7	3	2	1	9	0
32	MF	(Serbia) SRB	Marko Mladenović	1	0	0+1	0	0+0	0	0	0
36	MF	(Germany) GER	Ansgar Knauff	40	8	24+7	7	0+1	1	3+5	0
37	MF	(Germany) GER	Sidney Raebiger	0	0	0	0	0	0	0	0
45	MF	(Germany) GER	Mehdi Loune	0	0	0	0	0	0	0	0
49	MF	(Germany) GER	Harpreet Ghotra	0	0	0	0	0	0	0	0
Forwards
7	FW	(Egypt) EGY	Omar Marmoush	41	17	27+2	12	1+2	1	9	4
9	FW	(Austria) AUT	Saša Kalajdžić	6	1	5	0	0	0	1	1
11	FW	(France) FRA	Hugo Ekitike	16	4	7+7	4	0	0	0+2	0
19	FW	(France) FRA	Jean-Mattéo Bahoya	8	0	1+7	0	0	0	0	0
43	FW	(Germany) GER	Noel Futkeu	1	0	0	0	0+1	0	0	0
48	FW	(Spain) ESP	Nacho Ferri	13	1	0+8	1	0+1	0	0+4	0
Players transferred out during the season
6	MF	(Croatia) CRO	Kristijan Jakić	8	0	1+3	0	0	0	1+3	0
9	FW	(France) FRA	Randal Kolo Muani	4	3	2	1	1	1	1	1
11	FW	(Germany) GER	Faride Alidou	0	0	0	0	0	0	0	0
18	FW	(Germany) GER	Jessic Ngankam	23	3	2+13	0	1+1	2	1+5	1
19	FW	(Colombia) COL	Rafael Santos Borré	0	0	0	0	0	0	0	0
21	FW	(Argentina) ARG	Lucas Alario	0	0	0	0	0	0	0	0
23	MF	(Norway) NOR	Jens Petter Hauge	17	0	0+10	0	1+1	0	3+2	0
25	DF	(Germany) GER	Christopher Lenz	1	0	0+1	0	0	0	0	0
28	MF	(Germany) GER	Marcel Wenig	0	0	0	0	0	0	0	0
29	MF	(Denmark) DEN	Jesper Lindstrøm	3	0	1	0	1	0	0+1	0
30	MF	(United States) USA	Paxten Aaronson	14	0	1+6	0	0+1	0	2+4	0
42	FW	(Croatia) CRO	Igor Matanović	0	0	0	0	0	0	0	0

Source: Competitions

=== Goalscorers ===
Rank	No.	Pos.	Nat.	Player	Bundesliga	DFB-Pokal	Europa Conference League	Total
1	7	FW	(Egypt)	Omar Marmoush	12	1	4	17
2	26	MF	(France)	Éric Junior Dina Ebimbe	5	2	3	10
3	36	MF	(Germany)	Ansgar Knauff	7	1	0	8
4	15	MF	(Tunisia)	Ellyes Skhiri	2	1	2	5
5	8	MF	(Algeria)	Farès Chaïbi	2	0	2	4
5	11	FW	(France)	Hugo Ekitike	4	0	0	4
5	27	MF	(Germany)	Mario Götze	3	1	0	4
5	4	DF	(Germany)	Robin Koch	2	0	2	4
9	9	FW	(France)	Randal Kolo Muani	1	1	1	3
9	29	DF	(France)	Niels Nkounkou	3	0	0	3
9	18	FW	(Germany)	Jessic Ngankam	0	2	1	3
12	16	MF	(Sweden)	Hugo Larsson	2	0	0	2
12	35	DF	(Brazil)	Tuta	1	0	1	2
14	24	DF	(Portugal)	Aurélio Buta	1	0	0	1
14	48	FW	(Spain)	Nacho Ferri	1	0	0	1
14	9	FW	(Austria)	Saša Kalajdžić	0	0	1	1
14	31	DF	(Germany)	Philipp Max	1	0	0	1
14	5	DF	(Croatia)	Hrvoje Smolčić	1	0	0	1
Owngoals					3	0	0	3
Totals					51	9	17	77

Last updated: 18 May 2024

=== Clean sheets ===
Rank	No.	Pos.	Nat.	Player	Bundesliga	DFB-Pokal	Europa Conference League	Total
1	1	GK	(Germany)	Kevin Trapp	7	1	2	10
2	33	GK	(Germany)	Jens Grahl	0	1	1	2
Totals					6	2	3	11

Last updated: 18 May 2024

=== Disciplinary record ===
No.	Pos	Nat	Player	Bundesliga			DFB-Pokal			Europa Conference League			Total		
No.	Pos	Nat	Player	Yellow card	(yellow card) (yellow-red card)	Red card	Yellow card	(yellow card) (yellow-red card)	Red card	Yellow card	(yellow card) (yellow-red card)	Red card	Yellow card	(yellow card) (yellow-red card)	Red card
1	GK	(Germany)	Kevin Trapp	2	0	0	0	0	0	1	0	1	3	0	1
3	DF	(Ecuador)	Willian Pacho	6	0	0	1	0	0	0	0	0	7	0	0
4	DF	(Germany)	Robin Koch	10	0	0	1	0	0	1	0	0	12	0	0
5	DF	(Croatia)	Hrvoje Smolčić	0	0	0	0	0	0	0	0	0	0	0	0
6	MF	(Croatia)	Kristijan Jakić	1	0	0	0	0	0	0	1	0	1	1	0
7	FW	(Egypt)	Omar Marmoush	7	0	0	0	0	0	1	0	0	8	0	0
8	MF	(Algeria)	Farès Chaïbi	2	0	0	0	0	0	1	0	0	3	0	0
9	FW	(France)	Randal Kolo Muani	0	0	0	0	0	0	0	0	0	0	0	0
9	FW	(Austria)	Saša Kalajdžić	0	0	0	0	0	0	0	0	0	0	0	0
11	FW	(France)	Hugo Ekitike	3	0	0	0	0	0	0	0	0	3	0	0
15	MF	(Tunisia)	Ellyes Skhiri	1	0	0	1	0	0	0	0	0	2	0	0
16	MF	(Sweden)	Hugo Larsson	1	0	0	0	0	0	0	0	0	1	0	0
17	MF	(Germany)	Sebastian Rode	0	0	0	0	0	0	0	0	0	0	0	0
18	FW	(Germany)	Jessic Ngankam	2	0	0	1	0	0	0	0	0	3	0	0
19	FW	(Colombia)	Rafael Santos Borré	0	0	0	0	0	0	0	0	0	0	0	0
19	FW	(France)	Jean-Mattéo Bahoya	0	0	0	0	0	0	0	0	0	0	0	0
20	MF	(Japan)	Makoto Hasebe	1	0	0	0	0	0	0	0	0	1	0	0
21	FW	(Argentina)	Lucas Alario	0	0	0	0	0	0	0	0	0	0	0	0
22	DF	(United States)	Timothy Chandler	0	0	0	0	0	0	1	0	0	1	0	0
23	MF	(Norway)	Jens Petter Hauge	0	0	0	0	0	0	0	0	0	0	0	0
24	DF	(Portugal)	Aurélio Buta	5	0	0	0	0	0	4	0	0	9	0	0
25	DF	(Germany)	Christopher Lenz	0	0	0	0	0	0	0	0	0	0	0	0
25	MF	(Netherlands)	Donny van de Beek	1	0	0	0	0	0	0	0	0	1	0	0
26	MF	(France)	Éric Junior Dina Ebimbe	5	0	0	1	0	0	2	0	0	8	0	0
27	MF	(Germany)	Mario Götze	3	1	0	0	0	0	0	0	0	3	1	0
28	MF	(Germany)	Marcel Wenig	0	0	0	0	0	0	0	0	0	0	0	0
29	MF	(Denmark)	Jesper Lindstrøm	0	0	0	0	0	0	0	0	0	0	0	0
29	DF	(France)	Niels Nkounkou	3	1	0	0	0	0	1	0	0	4	1	0
30	MF	(United States)	Paxten Aaronson	0	0	0	0	0	0	2	0	0	2	0	0
31	DF	(Germany)	Philipp Max	2	0	0	0	0	0	0	0	0	2	0	0
32	MF	(Germany)	Marko Mladenović	0	0	0	0	0	0	0	0	0	0	0	0
33	GK	(Germany)	Jens Grahl	0	0	0	0	0	0	0	0	0	0	0	0
35	DF	(Brazil)	Tuta	0	1	1	0	0	0	2	0	0	2	1	1
36	MF	(Germany)	Ansgar Knauff	5	1	0	0	0	0	0	0	0	5	1	0
37	MF	(Germany)	Sidney Raebiger	0	0	0	0	0	0	0	0	0	0	0	0
40	GK	(Brazil)	Kauã Santos	0	0	0	0	0	0	0	0	0	0	0	0
41	GK	(Albania)	Simon Simoni	0	0	0	0	0	0	0	0	0	0	0	0
43	FW	(Germany)	Noel Futkeu	0	0	0	0	0	0	0	0	1	0	0	1
44	DF	(Ecuador)	Davis Bautista	0	0	0	0	0	0	0	0	0	0	0	0
45	MF	(Germany)	Mehdi Loune	0	0	0	0	0	0	0	0	0	0	0	0
46	MF	(Germany)	Dario Gebuhr	0	0	0	0	0	0	0	0	0	0	0	0
48	FW	(Spain)	Nacho Ferri	0	0	0	0	0	0	0	0	0	0	0	0
49	MF	(Germany)	Harpreet Ghotra	0	0	0	0	0	0	0	0	0	0	0	0
	DF	(Germany)	Nnamdi Collins	0	0	0	0	0	0	0	0	0	0	0	0
Totals				60	4	1	6	0	1	15	1	1	74	5	3

Last updated: 18 May 2024
