= Jann Bangert =

German footballer

Personal information
- Date of birth: 20 April 1997 (age 29)
- Place of birth: Weilburg-Kubach, Germany
- Height: 1.80 m (5 ft 11 in)
- Position: Forward

Team information
- Current team: SC Waldgirmes
- Number: 21

Youth career
- 2006–2011: TuS Kubach
- 2011–2013: Eintracht Frankfurt
- 2013–2016: Wehen Wiesbaden

Senior career*
Years	Team	Apps	(Gls)
2016–2017	Wehen Wiesbaden	5	(0)
2017–2018	TSV Schott Mainz	1	(0)
2018–2019	SV Rot-Weiß Hadamar	56	(38)
2019	FC Gießen II	10	(5)
2019–2021	FC Gießen	20	(2)
2021–2023	SV Rot-Weiß Hadamar	28	(8)
2023–	SC Waldgirmes	31	(4)
- * Club domestic league appearances and goals as of 27 July 2024

Jann Bangert (born 20 April 1997) is a German footballer who plays as a forward for SC Waldgirmes.
