= Waldstadion =

Waldstadion (German pronunciation: [ˈvaltˌʃtaːdi̯ɔn]; German: Forest Stadium) is the name of several stadia or football grounds in Germany and Austria:

Germany

- ALNO-Arena at Pfullendorf, previously known as Waldstadion an der Kasernenstraße
- Deutsche Bank Park (formerly "Commerzbank Arena") at Frankfurt am Main, home of Eintracht Frankfurt, more known as Waldstadion
- Städtisches Waldstadion at Aalen, home of VfR Aalen
- Waldstadion Feucht at Feucht, home of 1. SC Feucht
- Waldstadion Hasborn at Hasborn, home of Rot-Weiss Hasborn-Dautweiler
- Waldstadion Heeslingen at Heeslingen, home of TuS Heeslingen
- Waldstadion Homburg at Homburg (Saar), home of FC Homburg
- Waldstadion an der Kaiserlinde at Spiesen-Elversberg, home of SV Elversberg
- Waldstadion Ludwigsfelde at Ludwigsfelde, home of Ludwigsfelder FC
- Waldstadion Osterholz-Scharmbeck at Osterholz-Scharmbeck, home of VSK Osterholz-Scharmbeck
- Waldstadion Weismain, home of former Regionalliga club SC Weismain-Obermain
- Willi-Schillig-Stadion at Ebersdorf bei Coburg, previously known as Waldstadion and home of VfL Frohnlach
- Waldstadion am Erbsenberg at Kaiserslautern, home of VfR Kaiserslautern
- Waldstadion (Giessen) at Giessen, home of VfB Gießen
- Sandbahn Rennen Herxheim (known as the Waldstadion), motorcycle speedway track in Herxheim bei Landau/Pfalz

Austria

- Waldstadion (Austria) at Pasching, home of FC Juniors OÖ
- Waldstadion Schönau near Frankenfels, home of FCU Frankenfels
