= Benedict Dos Santos =

German footballer

Personal information
- Date of birth: 2 May 1998 (age 28)
- Place of birth: Wertheim am Main, Germany
- Height: 1.77 m (5 ft 10 in)
- Position: Midfielder

Team information
- Current team: SV Breuningsweiler
- Number: 18

Youth career
- SpVgg Mössingen
- –2011: SSV Reutlingen
- 2011–2017: VfB Stuttgart

Senior career*
Years	Team	Apps	(Gls)
2016–2019	VfB Stuttgart II	62	(1)
2019–2021	Waldhof Mannheim	20	(0)
2021–2022	FC Gießen	19	(0)
2022–2024	Sonnenhof Großaspach	17	(0)
2024	Türkspor Neckarsulm	4	(0)
2024–	SV Breuningsweiler		
- * Club domestic league appearances and goals as of 1 June 2024

Benedict Dos Santos (born 2 May 1998) is a German professional footballer who plays as a midfielder for SV Breuningsweiler.
