= Daniel Steuernagel =

German football manager

Personal information
- Date of birth: 16 November 1979 (age 46)
- Place of birth: Laubach, West Germany

Team information
- Current team: FSV Fernwald (manager)

Youth career
- SV Inheiden
- TSV Hungen

Senior career*
| Years | Team | Apps | (Gls) |
- FSV Steinbach
- VfB Aßlar
- FSV Steinbach
- TSV Michelbach
- Eintracht Lollar
- Teutonia Watzenborn-Steinberg

Managerial career
- 2008–2010: Viktoria Nidda
- 2010–2013: SSV Lindheim
- 2014–2016: Teutonia Watzenborn-Steinberg
- 2018–2019: Kickers Offenbach
- 2019–2020: KFC Uerdingen
- 2024–: FSV Fernwald
- * Club domestic league appearances and goals

Daniel Steuernagel (born 16 November 1979) is a German football manager, who is currently managing FSV Fernwald.

== Managerial career ==
Steuernagel, who worked as a teacher for many years after studying elementary school education, began his coaching career in 2008 with local clubs Viktoria Nidda and SSV Lindheim. He then spent two seasons with SC Teutonia Watzenborn-Steinberg, which later became FC Gießen, in the Hessen Mitte regional league. In the 2014/15 and 2015/16 seasons, Steuernagel won two consecutive promotions with Teutonia, from the Verbandsliga via the Hessenliga to the Regionalliga Südwest.

From October 2016 to August 2017, Steuernagel was employed as a sports director by the Regionalliga West team Sportfreunde Siegen. From June 2017 Steuernagel devoted himself full-time to training as a football coach, which is why the collaboration ended.

As a graduate of the 2017/18 training year, the Hessian finally completed his training as a football coach at the Hennes-Weisweiler Academy in Cologne. In addition to him, former professional players such as Antonio Di Salvo, Markus Daun, Dimitrios Grammozis and Francisco Copado also successfully took part in the course.

In September 2019, Steuernagel was released by Kickers Offenbach.

On 16 October 2019, he was announced as the new manager of KFC Uerdingen. He was replaced by Stefan Krämer on 10 March 2020.

His contract was valid until the end of the season. In March 2020, Steuernagel was replaced by Stefan Krämer, although the club offered him the opportunity to remain part of the coaching staff.

In 2024 he returned to management, when he became new manager of FSV Fernwald.
