= FC Eddersheim =

German football club

- Full name: Fußballclub 1931 Eddersheim e.V.
- Founded: 12 December 1931; 94 years ago
- Ground: Sportplatz Mönchhofstraße
- Chairman: Günther Fuchs
- Manager: Andreas Schreier
- League: Hessenliga (V)
- 2025–26: Hessenliga, 2nd of 18
Home colours	Away colours

The FC Eddersheim is a German association football club from the town of Hattersheim am Main, Hesse.

The club's greatest success came in 2012 when it earned promotion to the Hessenliga, the highest football league in Hesse, but it was relegated again after only one season.

== History ==
FC Eddersheim was formed on 12 December 1931. The club played in local amateur football for the first six decades of its existence until 1996, when it won the Bezirksliga and earned promotion to the Bezirksoberliga. Six seasons later the club won a championship in this league, too and earned promotion to the tier five Landesliga.

FC played the next nine seasons in the Landesliga Hessen-Mitte, renamed to Verbandsliga Hessen-Mitte in 2008. During that time the club finished runners-up on three occasions, 2007, 2009 and 2012. It failed in its first two attempts in the promotion round to the Hessenliga in 2007 and 2009 but succeeded in 2012. The 2012–13 Hessenliga season however proved unsuccessful to the club, finishing seventeenth and being relegated again.

Since then the club has been playing in the Verbandsliga again.

== Honours ==
The club's honours:

- Verbandsliga Hessen-Mitte
  - Runners-up: 2007, 2009, 2012
- Bezirksoberliga Wiesbaden
  - Champions: 2002
- Bezirksliga Main-Taunus
  - Champions: 1996

== Recent seasons ==
The recent season-by-season performance of the club:

Season	Division	Tier	Position
1999–2000	Bezirksoberliga Wiesbaden	VI	3rd
2000–01	Bezirksoberliga Wiesbaden	VI	4th
2001–02	Bezirksoberliga Wiesbaden	VI	1st↑
2002–03	Landesliga Hessen-Mitte	V	7th
2003–04	Landesliga Hessen-Mitte	V	4th
2004–05	Landesliga Hessen-Mitte	V	9th
2005–06	Landesliga Hessen-Mitte	V	6th
2006–07	Landesliga Hessen-Mitte	V	2nd
2007–08	Landesliga Hessen-Mitte	V	8th
2008–09	Verbandsliga Hessen-Mitte	VI	2nd
2009–10	Verbandsliga Hessen-Mitte	VI	6th
2010–11	Verbandsliga Hessen-Mitte	VI	5th
2011–12	Verbandsliga Hessen-Mitte	VI	2nd↑
2012–13	Hessenliga	V	17th ↓
2013–14	Verbandsliga Hessen-Mitte	VI	5th
2014–15	Verbandsliga Hessen-Mitte	VI	9th
2015–16	Verbandsliga Hessen-Mitte	VI	5th
2016–17	Verbandsliga Hessen-Mitte	VI	8th
2017–18	Verbandsliga Hessen-Mitte	VI	1st↑
2018–19	Hessenliga	V	8th
2019–20	Hessenliga	V	3rd
2020–21	Hessenliga	V	19th
2021–22	Hessenliga	V	4th
2022–23	Hessenliga	V	11th

- With the introduction of the Regionalligas in 1994 and the 3. Liga in 2008 as the new third tier, below the 2. Bundesliga, all leagues below dropped one tier. Alongside the introduction of the 3. Liga in 2008, a number of football leagues in Hesse were renamed, with the Oberliga Hessen renamed to Hessenliga, the Landesliga to Verbandsliga, the Bezirksoberliga to Gruppenliga and the Bezirksliga to Kreisoberliga.

=== Key ===
↑ Promoted	↓ Relegated
