= SG 01 Hoechst =

German football club

- Founded: 1901
- Ground: Stadion am Stadtpark
- Capacity: 2,500
- Chairman: Helmut Wagner
- Manager: Mustafa Ichaoui
- League: Gruppenliga Wiesbaden (VII)
- 2015–16: Kreisoberliga Main Taunus (VIII), 1st (promoted)
Home colours	Away colours

The SG 01 Hoechst is a German association football club from the Höchst district of Frankfurt am Main, Hesse.

The club's greatest success has been to qualify for the German Cup on two occasions, in 1975–76 and 1998–99. At league level it has played in the highest league of the state of Hesse, the Hessenliga, on a number of occasions, with a runners-up finish in 1998–99 as its best result.

== History ==
SG Hoechst was formed in 1901. The club first played in Hesse's highest league, then the tier two Landesliga Hessen from 1945 to 1947.

After a lengthy spell in lower amateur football the club was promoted to the Landesliga Hessen-Süd, the fourth tier of league football, in 1970. After a season at this level it moved to the Landesliga Hessen-Mitte in 1971 where it played as a lower table side. The club qualified for the first round of the German Cup in 1975–76 but lost 3–2 to ASV Idar-Oberstein. In 1976–77 SG won its Landesliga division and earned promotion to the Amateurliga Hessen, the highest league in the state.

Seven seasons at this level followed, with the league renamed to Amateur-Oberliga Hessen in 1978, with the best result being a fifth place in 1977–78. After relegation back to the Landesliga in 1984 the club finished in the top three in each of the next three seasons, culminating in a second league championship and promotion in 1987. A five-year stint in the Amateur-Oberliga Hessen followed before being relegated once more in 1992 but also promptly earning promotion again the year after.

The club came last in the league in 1993–94 but was saved from relegation by the introduction of the new Regionalliga Süd and the entry of the best seven teams of the Amateur-Oberliga Hessen to this league. SG Hoechst improved from this result and spent another eight seasons in the league which had now dropped to fourth tier in the league system and was renamed Oberliga Hessen. It achieved its best-ever result when it finished runners-up in 1998–99 and unsuccessfully competed in the promotion round to the Regionalliga. The same season it also made its second appearance in the German Cup where it lost 1–0 to FC Energie Cottbus. The club spent another three seasons in the Oberliga, finishing third in 2001–02. At the end of this season SG had to withdraw from the league for financial reasons.

SG Hoechst experienced financial difficulties after that, having to declare insolvency in 2003. Since then the club has been playing in the lower amateur leagues of Hesse, rising as far as the tier seven Gruppenliga Wiesbaden for three seasons but dropping back to the Kreisoberliga in 2014. In 2015–16 the club won the Kreisoberliga and returned to the Gruppenliga.

== Honours ==
The club's honours:

=== League ===
- Oberliga Hessen
  - Runners-up: 1999
- Landesliga Hessen-Mitte
  - Champions: (3) 1977, 1987, 1993
  - Runners-up: 1985
- Kreisoberliga Main Taunus
  - Champions: 2011, 2016

=== Cup ===
- DFB-Pokal
  - Participant: 1975–76, 1998–99
- Hesse Cup
  - Winners: 1998

== Recent seasons ==
The recent season-by-season performance of the club:

Season	Division	Tier	Position
1999–2000	Oberliga Hessen	IV	7th
2000–01	Oberliga Hessen	IV	11th
2001–02	Oberliga Hessen	IV	3rd (withdrawn)
2002–03	Bezirksoberliga	VI	↓
2003–04	Bezirksliga Main Taunus	VII	12th
2004–05	Bezirksliga Main Taunus	VII	17th ↓
2005–06	Kreisliga A Main Taunus	VIII	13th
2006–07	Kreisliga A Main Taunus	VIII	13th
2007–08	Kreisliga A Main Taunus	VIII	5th
2008–09	Kreisliga A Main Taunus	IX	3rd
2009–10	Kreisliga A Main Taunus	IX	1st ↑
2010–11	Kreisoberliga Main Taunus	VIII	1st ↑
2011–12	Gruppenliga Wiesbaden	VII	6th
2012–13	Gruppenliga Wiesbaden	VII	11th
2013–14	Gruppenliga Wiesbaden	VII	18th ↓
2014–15	Kreisoberliga Main Taunus	VIII	6th
2015–16	Kreisoberliga Main Taunus	VIII	1st ↑
2016–17	Gruppenliga Wiesbaden	VII	

- With the introduction of the Regionalligas in 1994 and the 3. Liga in 2008 as the new third tier, below the 2. Bundesliga, all leagues below dropped one tier. Alongside the introduction of the 3. Liga in 2008, a number of football leagues in Hesse were renamed, with the Oberliga Hessen renamed to Hessenliga, the Landesliga to Verbandsliga, the Bezirksoberliga to Gruppenliga and the Bezirksliga to Kreisoberliga.

=== Key ===
↑ Promoted	↓ Relegated
