= 2012–13 Hessenliga =

Hessenliga
- Season: 2012–13
- Champions: KSV Baunatal
- Promoted: KSV Baunatal
- Relegated: SC Waldgirmes; FC Viktoria 09 Urberach; FSV Braunfels; FC 1931 Eddersheim; 1. FCA Darmstadt
- Matches: 306
- Goals: 1,029 (3.36 per match)
- Top goalscorer: Ahmet Marankoz (27 goals) (TSV Eintracht Stadtallendorf)

The 2012–13 season of the Hessenliga was the fifth season of the league at tier five (V) of the German football league system.

== League table ==
Pos	Team	Pld	W	D	L	GF	GA	GD	Pts	Promotion, qualification or relegation
1	KSV Baunatal (C, P)	34	20	5	9	69	43	+26	65	Promotion to Regionalliga Südwest
2	TGM SV Jügesheim	34	18	10	6	49	22	+27	64	
3	SV Buchonia Flieden	34	19	3	12	69	54	+15	60	
4	SV Rot-Weiß Hadamar	34	16	10	8	69	45	+24	58	
5	SV Wehen Wiesbaden II	34	17	7	10	64	51	+13	58	
6	FSC Lohfelden	34	17	5	12	58	47	+11	56	
7	FSV 1926 Fernwald	34	15	8	11	79	42	+37	53	
8	Hünfelder SV	34	14	9	11	63	51	+12	51	
9	TSV Eintracht Stadtallendorf	34	15	5	14	53	50	+3	50	
10	SC Viktoria 06 Griesheim	34	15	5	14	58	57	+1	50	
11	OSC Vellmar	34	15	4	15	70	60	+10	49	
12	Rot-Weiß Darmstadt	34	15	4	15	63	63	0	49	
13	Kickers Offenbach II	34	13	6	15	51	49	+2	45	
14	SC Waldgirmes (R)	34	10	7	17	56	64	−8	37	Qualification to relegation playoffs
15	FC Viktoria 09 Urberach (Note: 6 points deducted?) (R)	34	12	3	19	55	73	−18	33	Relegation to Verbandsliga
16	FSV Braunfels (R)	34	9	6	19	32	71	−39	33	Relegation to Verbandsliga
17	FC 1931 Eddersheim (R)	34	7	4	23	47	91	−44	25	Relegation to Verbandsliga
18	1. FCA Darmstadt (R)	34	6	5	23	26	98	−72	23	Relegation to Verbandsliga

Source: fussballdaten.de
Rules for classification: 1) points; 2) goal difference; 3) number of goals scored.
(C) Champions; (P) Promoted; (R) Relegated
