= VfB Gießen =

German football club

- Full name: Verein für Ballsport; 1900 Gießen e.V.
- Founded: 5 August 1900 (as Gießener Fußball-Klub)
- Dissolved: 30 June 2018 (football)
- Ground: Waldstadion
- Capacity: 10,000
Home colours	Away colours

VfB Gießen was a German football club based in Giessen, Hesse, that last played in the Gruppenliga Gießen-Marburg (VII).

The club's greatest success was qualifying for the first round of the German Cup in 1979–80 and winning the tier three Amateurliga Hessen in 1962–63.

== History ==
On 17 May 1956 SpVgg 1900 Gießen was merged with VfB 08 Gießen to become VfB 1900 Gießen. VfB first one promotion to the tier three Amateurliga Hessen in 1951 and would play at this level for the next 31 consecutive seasons, mostly as mid-table side the club won the league in 1962–63 but was unable to earn promotion because of the reorganisation of the German football league system that season. VfB returned to its mid-table existence, never coming close to league title again until relegated from the league in 1982. In this area also fall the club's three Hesse Cup triumphs, won in 1964, 1972 and 1979. The later also allowed the club to take part in the 1979–80 DFB-Pokal where it lost to 2–4 FC 08 Homburg in the first round.

For the next six seasons in the tier four Landesliga Hessen-Mitte the club finished in the top three each season but was unable to win promotion back to the Hessenliga. In 1988–89 however it came 14th, one place behind local rival ASV Gießen, and was relegated. It made an immediate recovery, gradually returned to its old form in the league and finally won promotion to Hesse's highest league in 1995 courtesy to a Landesliga title.

VfB spend the next six seasons in the Oberliga Hessen, generally achieving good results but the club withdrew from league in 2000–01 for financial reasons despite finishing sixth.

VfB did not play league football at all in 2001–02 and restarted in the Kreisliga B (IX) in 2002 and has continuously worked itself up through the ranks again and, from the 2009–10 to 2016–17 seasons, played in the sixth tier Verbandsliga Hessen-Mitte. In this league, they finished runners-up in 2011 but missed out on promotion in the promotion round, and in 2017 finished last out of 17 and was relegated to the Gruppenliga.

In March 2018, VfB announced the closure of their football department which was ceded to Teutonia Watzenborn-Steinberg. On 1 July, Teutonia was renamed FC Gießen.

== Honours ==
The club's honours:

=== League ===
- Amateurliga Hessen
  - Champions: 1963
- Landesliga Hessen Mitte
  - Champions: 1995
  - Runners-up: 1983, 1986, 1987, 1993, 2011
- Gruppenliga Gießen-Marburg
  - Champions: 2009
- Bezirksliga Gießen-Süd
  - Champions: 2008
- Kreisliga A Gießen
  - Champions: 2006

=== Cup ===
- Hesse Cup
  - Winners: 1964, 1972, 1979
  - Runners-up: 2015

== Last seasons ==
The last season-by-season performance of the club:

Season	Division	Tier	Position
1999–2000	Oberliga Hessen	IV	6th
2000–01	Oberliga Hessen	IV	9th (withdrawn)
2001–02	inactive		
2002–03	Kreisliga B2 Gießen	IX	
2003–04	Kreisliga B2 Gießen	IX	3rd ↑
2004–05	Kreisliga A Gießen	VIII	7th
2005–06	Kreisliga A Gießen	VIII	1st ↑
2006–07	Bezirksliga Gießen-Süd	VII	4th
2007–08	Bezirksliga Gießen-Süd	VII	1st ↑
2008–09	Gruppenliga Gießen-Marburg	VII	1st ↑
2009–10	Verbandsliga Hessen-Mitte	VI	5th
2010–11	Verbandsliga Hessen-Mitte	VI	2nd
2011–12	Verbandsliga Hessen-Mitte	VI	5th
2012–13	Verbandsliga Hessen-Mitte	VI	6th
2013–14	Verbandsliga Hessen-Mitte	VI	3rd
2014–15	Verbandsliga Hessen-Mitte	VI	4th
2015–16	Verbandsliga Hessen-Mitte	VI	4th
2016–17	Verbandsliga Hessen-Mitte	VI	17th ↓
2017–18	Gruppenliga Gießen-Marburg	VII	15th

- With the introduction of the Regionalligas in 1994 and the 3. Liga in 2008 as the new third tier, below the 2. Bundesliga, all leagues below dropped one tier. Also in 2008, the majority of football leagues in Hesse were renamed, with the Oberliga Hessen becoming the Hessenliga, the Landesliga becoming the Verbandsliga, the Bezirksoberliga becoming the Gruppenliga and the Bezirksliga becoming the Kreisoberliga.

=== Key ===
↑ Promoted	↓ Relegated

== Stadium ==
VfB Gießen played its home fixtures at the 10,000 capacity Waldstadion.
