= Willian Pacho =

Ecuadorian footballer (born 2001)

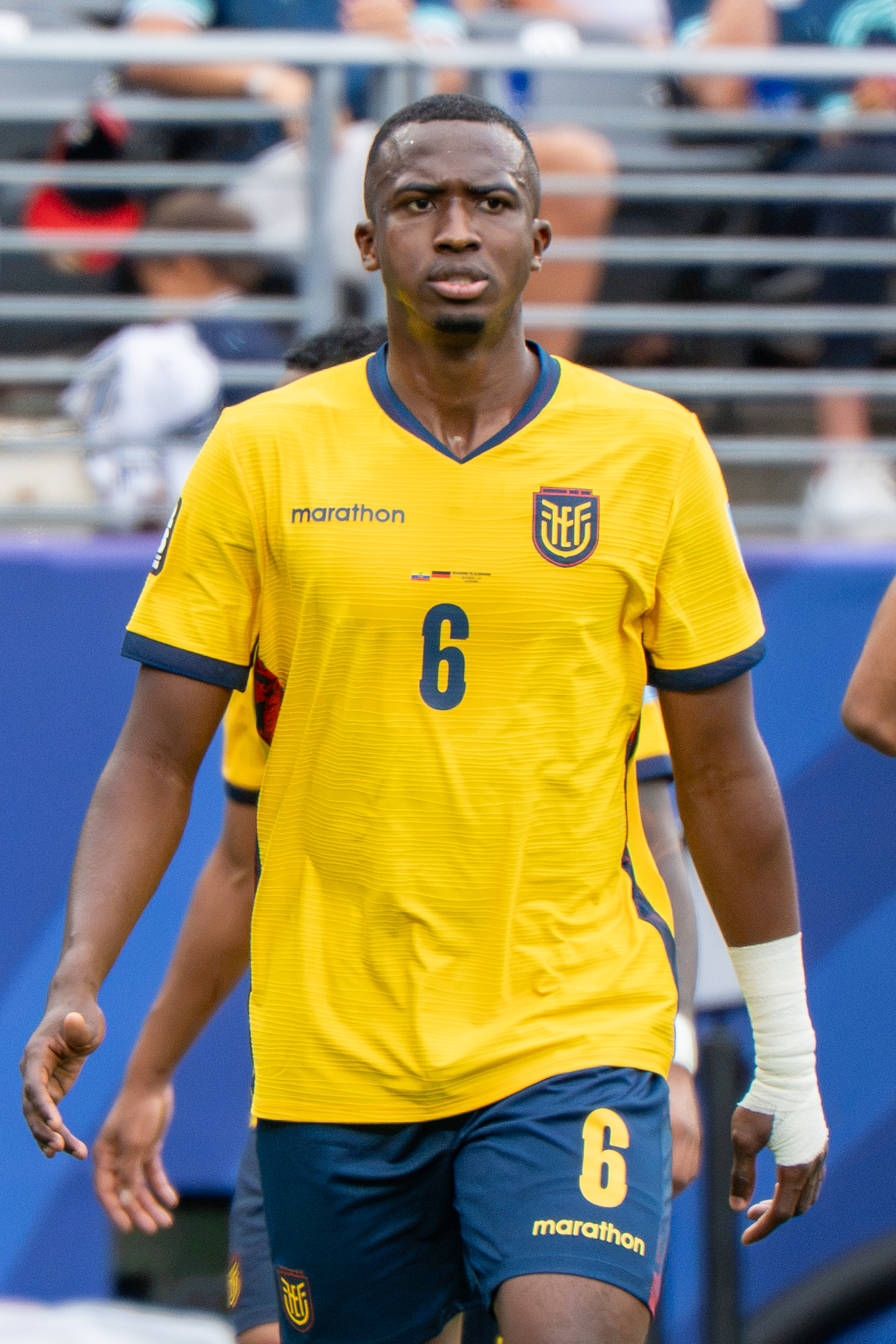
- Pacho with Ecuador in 2026

Personal information
- Full name: Willian Joel Pacho Tenorio
- Date of birth: 16 October 2001 (age 25)
- Place of birth: Quinindé, Ecuador
- Height: 1.88 m (6 ft 2 in)
- Position: Centre-back

Team information
- Current team: Paris Saint-Germain
- Number: 51

Youth career
- 2012–2017: Huracán de Quinindé
- 2017–2020: Independiente del Valle

Senior career*
Years	Team	Apps	(Gls)
2019–2022	Independiente del Valle	26	(0)
2022–2023	Royal Antwerp	42	(0)
2023–2024	Eintracht Frankfurt	33	(0)
2024–	Paris Saint-Germain	59	(0)

International career^{‡}
2023–	Ecuador	41	(2)
- * Club domestic league appearances and goals as of 21:17, 21 November 2026 (UTC) ‡ National team caps and goals as of 5 October 2026

Willian Joel Pacho Tenorio (born 16 October 2001) is an Ecuadorian professional footballer who plays as a centre-back for Ligue 1 club Paris Saint-Germain and the Ecuador national team.

== Club career ==
=== Independiente del Valle ===
From Quinindé in the far north of Ecuador, Pacho moved to the suburbs of capital Quito to debut with Independiente del Valle in 2019, with both he and the club going on to enjoy a remarkable run of success over the next three years.

A non-playing substitute across the entire 2018 U-20 Copa Libertadores run that saw IDV reach the final only to lose to 2–1 in the decider to Uruguayans Nacional, Pacho was first named on the bench for IDV's 2–0 win at Mushuc Runa on 15 March 2019.

Pacho was finally given his first-team debut in November of that year, starting in the 0–0 draw against Delfin that rounded off IDV's regular season campaign ahead of the Ecuadorian League Play-Offs, the match coming a week before Independiente del Valle claimed their first ever international crown, beating Colón of Argentina 3–1 in Asunción in the 2019 Copa Sudamericana Final. Pacho was not a member of the continental squad, but did feature heavily in IDV's 2020 U-20 Copa Libertadores triumph, playing all but one game.

Independiente beat Flamengo of Brazil on penalties in the semi-finals, and Argentine giants River Plate 2–1 in the final in Luque. Pacho started both knockout games in defence. With a good young crop coming through, Independiente del Valle went on to lift the Ecuadorian League title for the very first time in 2021, defeating Emelec in the finals by a 4–2 aggregate score. Pacho played 17 games on the road to glory, starting when he was 16.

=== Royal Antwerp ===
Having been spotted by Belgian scouts, Pacho signed a five-year contract with title-chasing Royal Antwerp on 28 January 2022. Pacho only played three league games in his first season with Antwerp for coach Brian Priske, as the Great Old finished fourth in the Belgian League title play-offs behind champions Club Brugge, runners-up Royale Union Saint-Gilloise and third-placed Anderlecht, who beat Antwerp home and away in the Championship play-offs to keep the Great Old at bay.

Under new coach Mark van Bommel, Pacho became a fixture in the Royal Antwerp defence for the 2022–23 season, as Antwerp won their first nine games of the season on the way to qualifying for the 2023 Belgian Cup Final and title play-offs, and within months had attracted interest from Ligue 1, the Scottish Premiership and Bundesliga. An agreement was reached during the winter transfer window in January 2023 between Royal Antwerp and reigning UEFA Europa League champions Eintracht Frankfurt that Pacho would join them at the end of the season.

Pacho started Antwerp's 2023 Belgian Cup Final win over Mechelen, the club's second triumph in the competition in four seasons.

=== Eintracht Frankfurt ===
On 30 March 2023, it was announced that Pacho had signed a five-year contract with Eintracht, valid from 1 June. In the 2023–24 season, Pacho started in 42 matches in all competitions, ranking among Eintracht Frankfurt's best players for duels won and passes completed.

=== Paris Saint-Germain ===
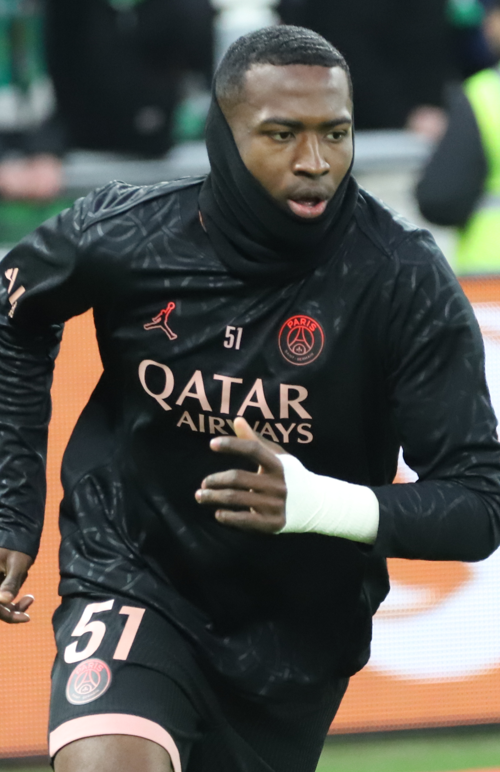
Pacho training with Paris Saint-Germain in 2025

On 9 August 2024, it was announced Pacho had officially signed for Ligue 1 club Paris Saint-Germain (PSG) for a reported upfront fee of €40 million (potentially rising to €45 million) on a five-year contract deal. He became the club's first Ecuadorian player. On 16 August, Pacho made his official debut for PSG in a 4–1 victory over Le Havre.

On 31 May 2025, he started in a 5–0 victory over Inter Milan in the Champions League final, becoming the first Ecuadorian to win the competition, and the fourth to win an UEFA competition, after Antonio Valencia, Pervis Estupiñán and Moisés Caicedo. He scored his first goal for PSG, which was also his first career club goal, on 21 October 2025 during the 7–2 victory against Bundesliga club Bayer Leverkusen in the UEFA Champions League league phase.

== International career ==
Pacho was included in the Ecuador senior squad for the 2022 FIFA World Cup, but did not play in any match. He debuted on 28 March 2023 in a 2–1 friendly victory against Australia in Melbourne while scoring his first international goal.

Pacho was called up to the final 26-man Ecuador squad for the 2024 Copa América.

On 31 May 2026, Pacho was selected in the 26-man squad for the 2026 FIFA World Cup.

== Personal life ==
Pacho's first name is often mistakenly listed as "William", since the two are almost interchangeably used in Spanish.

== Career statistics ==
=== Club ===
As of match played 21 November 2026

Appearances and goals by club, season and competition
Club	Season	League			National cup (Note: Includes Belgian Cup, DFB-Pokal, Coupe de France)		Continental		Other		Total	
Club	Season	Division	Apps	Goals	Apps	Goals	Apps	Goals	Apps	Goals	Apps	Goals
Independiente del Valle	2019	LigaPro Serie A	1	0	0	0	0	0	—		1	0
Independiente del Valle	2020	LigaPro Serie A	8	0	—		1 (Note: Appearance in Copa Libertadores)	0	0	0	9	0
Independiente del Valle	2021	LigaPro Serie A	17	0	—		12 (Note: Ten appearances in Copa Libertadores, two appearances in Copa Sudamericana)	0	1 (Note: Appearance in Supercopa Ecuador)	0	30	0
Independiente del Valle	Total		26	0	0	0	13	0	1	0	40	0
Royal Antwerp	2021–22	Belgian Pro League	3	0	0	0	0	0	—		3	0
Royal Antwerp	2022–23	Belgian Pro League	39	0	6	0	5 (Note: Appearances in UEFA Europa Conference League)	0	—		50	0
Royal Antwerp	Total		42	0	6	0	5	0	—		53	0
Eintracht Frankfurt	2023–24	Bundesliga	33	0	3	0	8	0	—		44	0
Paris Saint-Germain	2024–25	Ligue 1	28	0	6	0	17 (Note: Appearances in UEFA Champions League)	0	6 (Note: One appearance in Trophée des Champions, five appearances in FIFA Club World Cup)	0	57	0
Paris Saint-Germain	2025–26	Ligue 1	23	0	1	0	17	2	3 (Note: One appearance in UEFA Super Cup, one appearance in FIFA Intercontinental Cup, one appearance in Trophée des Champions)	0	44	2
Paris Saint-Germain	2026–27	Ligue 1	8	0	0	0	4	0	2 (Note: One appearance in UEFA Super Cup, one appearance in Trophée des Champions)	0	14	0
Paris Saint-Germain	Total		59	0	7	0	38	2	11	0	115	2
Career total			160	0	16	0	64	2	12	0	252	2

=== International ===
As of match played 5 October 2026

Appearances and goals by national team and year
National team	Year	Apps	Goals
Ecuador	2023	9	2
Ecuador	2024	13	0
Ecuador	2025	10	0
Ecuador	2026	9	0
Total		41	2

Scores and results list Ecuador's goal tally first.

List of international goals scored by Willian Pacho
No.	Date	Venue	Opponent	Score	Result	Competition
1	28 March 2023	Docklands Stadium, Melbourne, Australia	Australia	2–1	2–1	Friendly
2	20 June 2023	Subaru Park, Chester, United States	Costa Rica	2–0	3–1	Friendly

== Honours ==
Independiente del Valle

- LigaPro Serie A: 2021
- U-20 Copa Libertadores: 2020

Royal Antwerp

- Belgian Pro League: 2022–23
- Belgian Cup: 2022–23

Paris Saint-Germain

- Ligue 1: 2024–25, 2025–26
- Coupe de France: 2024–25
- Trophée des Champions: 2024, 2025
- UEFA Champions League: 2024–25, 2025–26
- UEFA Super Cup: 2025, 2026
- FIFA Intercontinental Cup: 2025
- FIFA Club World Cup runner-up: 2025

Individual

- UNFP Ligue 1 Team of the Year: 2024–25, 2025–26
- FIFA Men's World 11: 2025
- IFFHS Men's World Team: 2025
- IFFHS Men's CONMEBOL Team: 2025
