= FSV 1926 Fernwald =

German football club

- Full name: Fußballsportverein 1926 Fernwald e. V.
- Founded: 30 March 1926; 100 years ago
- Ground: Stadion an der Oppenröder Straße
- Capacity: 2,500
- Chairman: Berhard Becker, Joachim Daniels, Ingo Steinke
- Manager: Daniel Steuernagel
- League: Hessenliga (V)
- 2025–26: Hessenliga, 13th of 18
Home colours	Away colours

FSV Fernwald is a German football club from the town of Fernwald, Hesse.

== History ==
Historical logo of FSV Steinbach

The club was established as FSV Steinbach on 30 March 1926. In 1935 the club disappeared when it was folded into the Turn- und Sport-Gemeinde Steinbach alongside several other Steinbach-area associations under the politically motivated policies of the Nazis which saw the dissolution of clubs which were considered by the regime to be ideologically undesirable. FSV re-emerged as an independent club after World War II in May 1949.

After decades as a local side the club was promoted to the Landesliga Hessen – Mitte (V) in 1992 where they competed until being sent down at the end of the 2000–01 season. Steinbach bounced back to enjoy its greatest success in 2005 with a Landesliga championship through a 2–1 victory over TSV Eintracht Stadtallendorf in the final match of the season to earn promotion to the Oberliga Hessen (IV), the state's highest amateur class.

On 8 December 2006 the membership voted to rename the club FSV 1926 Fernwald effective from 1 July 2007. Steinbach is one of three municipalities, the others being Albach and Annerod, that make up Fernwald.

After seven seasons in the Hessenliga the club opted to withdraw from the league in 2014, despite finishing tenth, and to drop down to the tier eight Kreisoberliga but won promotion back to the Gruppenliga in 2016.

== Honors ==
The club's honours:

=== League ===
- Landesliga Hessen-Mitte (V)
  - Champions: 2005
- Bezirksoberliga Gießen-Marburg Süd
  - Champions: 2003

== Recent managers ==
Recent managers of the club:

Manager	Start	Finish
Stefan Hassler	1 July 2006	30 June 2007
Michael de Kort	1 July 2007	19 December 2007
Niko Semlitsch	20 December 2007	12 September 2009
Stephan Belter	12 September 2009	30 June 2010
Daniyel Bulut	1 July 2010	30 June 2013
Günter Stiebig	1 July 2013	29 September 2013
Ronny Borchers	30 September 2013	30 June 2014
Roger Reitschmidt	1 July 2014	30 June 2018
Karl-Heinz Stete	1 July 2018	28 August 2019
Benjamin Lock	28 August 2019	30 June 2020
Daniyel Bulut	1 July 2020	30 June 2024
Daniel Steuernagel	1 July 2024	present

== Recent seasons ==
The recent season-by-season performance of the club:

Season	Division	Tier	Position
1999–2000	Landesliga Hessen-Mitte	V	4th
2000–01	Landesliga Hessen-Mitte	V	14th ↓
2001–02	Bezirksoberliga Gießen-Marburg Süd	VI	8th
2002–03	Bezirksoberliga Gießen-Marburg Süd	VI	1st ↑
2003–04	Landesliga Hessen-Mitte	V	5th
2004–05	Landesliga Hessen-Mitte	V	1st ↑
2005–06	Hessenliga	IV	15th
2006–07	Hessenliga	IV	7th
2007–08	Hessenliga	IV	11th
2008–09	Hessenliga	V	12th
2009–10	Hessenliga	V	13th
2010–11	Hessenliga	V	9th
2011–12	Hessenliga	V	3rd
2012–13	Hessenliga	V	7th
2013–14	Hessenliga	V	10th (withdrawn)
2014–15	Kreisoberliga Gießen	VIII	14th
2015–16	Kreisoberliga Gießen	VIII	1st ↑
2016–17	Gruppenliga Gießen/Marburg	VII	2nd ↑
2017–18	Verbandsliga Hessen Mitte	VI	2nd
2018–19	Verbandsliga Hessen Mitte	VI	1st ↑
2019–20	Hessenliga	V	18th
2020–21	Hessenliga	V	10th
2021–22	Hessenliga	V	6th
2022–23	Hessenliga	V	4th
2023–24	Hessenliga	V	8th
2024–25	Hessenliga	V	1st
2025–26	Hessenliga	V	13th

- With the introduction of the Regionalligas in 1994 and the 3. Liga in 2008 as the new third tier, below the 2. Bundesliga, all leagues below dropped one tier. Also in 2008, a large number of football leagues in Hesse were renamed, with the Oberliga Hessen becoming the Hessenliga, the Landesliga becoming the Verbandsliga, the Bezirksoberliga becoming the Gruppenliga and the Bezirksliga becoming the Kreisoberliga.

↑ Promoted	↓ Relegated

== Stadium ==
FSV play their home matches at the Stadion an der Oppenröder Straße which has a capacity of 2,500 spectators. In addition to a natural grass pitch the facility includes an artificial turf field which serves several area sports associations as a training site and is used for Oberliga matches if the main field cannot be used.
