= Verbandsliga Hessen-Mitte =

- Founded: 1965
- Country: Germany
- State: Hesse
- Number of clubs: 17
- Level on pyramid: Level 6
- Promotion to: Hessenliga
- Relegation to: Gruppenliga Wiesbaden; Gruppenliga Gießen/Marburg
- Domestic cup(s): Hessenpokal
- Current champions: TSV Steinbach II (2021–22)

The Verbandsliga Hessen-Mitte, until 2008 named Landesliga Hessen-Mitte, is currently the sixth tier of the German football league system. Until the introduction of the 3. Liga in 2008 it was the fifth tier of the league system, until the introduction of the Regionalligas in 1994 the fourth tier.

== Overview ==
The Verbandsliga Hessen-Mitte was formed in 1965 as the Landesliga Hessen-Mitte, a tier four feeder league to the then Amateurliga Hessen.

The winner of the Verbandsliga Mitte automatically qualifies for the Hessenliga, the runners-up need to compete with the runners-up of the Verbandsliga Hessen-Nord and the Verbandsliga Hessen-Süd as well as the 15th placed team of the Hessenliga for another promotion spot.

The Verbandsliga Hessen-Mitte is fed by the Gruppenliga Hessen-Wiesbaden, and Hessen-Gießen/Marburg. The winners of those are automatically promoted to the Verbandsliga, the runners-up play-off for another promotion spot.

Up until 1973 it was common for teams to move between Landesligen, resulting in the fact that some teams have won titles in two different Landesligen. This practice has since stopped.

Along with the renaming of the Oberliga Hessen to Hessenliga in 2008, the Landesliga was renamed Verbandsliga Hessen-Mitte.

== League champions ==
The league champions:

=== Verbandsliga ===
The league champions since the renaming of the league in 2008:

Season	Club
2008–09	VfB Marburg
2009–10	Eintracht Wetzlar
2010–11	SpVgg Hadamar
2011–12	FSV Braunfels
2012–13	SV Wiesbaden
2013–14	TSV Steinbach
2014–15	Teutonia Watzenborn-Steinberg
2015–16	Viktoria Kelsterbach
2016–17	SC Waldgirmes
2017–18	FC Eddersheim
2018–19	FSV 1926 Fernwald
2019–20	SV Zeilsheim
2020–21	Season curtailed and voided
2021–22	TSV Steinbach II

=== Landesliga ===
The league champions until the renaming of the league in 2008:

Season	Club
1965–66	FC Hanau 93
1966–67	Kickers Viktoria Mühlheim
1967–68	TuS Naunheim
1968–69	1. FC 1911 Hochstadt
1969–70	FSV 07 Bischofsheim
1970–71	Kickers Offenbach II
1971–72	SpVgg Bad Homburg
1972–73	SSV 1911 Dillenburg
1973–74	FVgg Kastel 06
1974–75	TSV Klein-Linden
1975–76	Viktoria Sindlingen
1976–77	SG 01 Hoechst
1977–78	Viktoria Sindlingen
1978–79	FVgg Kastel 06
1979–80	Eintracht Haiger

Season	Club
1980–81	Viktoria Sindlingen
1981–82	SV Wiesbaden
1982–83	RSV Würges
1983–84	TSV Battenberg
1984–85	VfL Marburg
1985–86	SV Wiesbaden
1986–87	SG 01 Hoechst
1987–88	TSV Battenberg
1988–89	SV Wehen
1989–90	VfL Marburg
1990–91	RSV Würges
1991–92	VfL Marburg
1992–93	SG 01 Hoechst
1993–94	VfR 07 Limburg

Season	Club
1994–95	VfB Gießen
1995–96	TSV Battenberg
1996–97	VfB Unterliederbach
1997–98	FC Ederbergland
1998–99	VfB Marburg
1999–00	SG Walluf 1932
2000–01	TSG Wörsdorf
2001–02	SC Waldgirmes
2002–03	FSV Braunfels
2003–04	SC Waldgirmes
2004–05	FSV Steinbach
2005–06	RSV Würges
2006–07	SV Wehen II
2007–08	TSV Eintracht Stadtallendorf

- FC Ederbergland hold the record in numbers of titles for the Landesliga Mitte, having won four, the first three under the name of TSV Battenberg. Only SpVgg Bad Homburg hold the same number of titles but those were won in the other two Landesligen – Mitte and Süd.

=== Additionally promoted teams ===
These clubs were promoted to the Oberliga after finishing second in the league:

Season	Club
1993–94	FC Herborn
1995–96	RSV Würges
1998–99	FSV Braunfels
2000–01	1. FC Eschborn
2005–06	FSV Braunfels
2006–07	Eintracht Wetzlar
2007–08	1. FC Eschborn
2011–12	FC Eddersheim
2015–16	FC Ederbergland
2018–19	TuS Dietkirchen
