= Davide Itter =

German footballer

Personal information
- Full name: Davide-Jerome Itter
- Date of birth: 5 January 1999 (age 27)
- Place of birth: Giessen, Germany
- Height: 1.84 m (6 ft 0 in)
- Positions: Right-back; right midfielder

Team information
- Current team: FC Gießen
- Number: 22

Youth career
- 2004–2011: FC Cleeberg
- 2011–2014: Eintracht Frankfurt
- 2015–2018: VfL Wolfsburg

Senior career*
| Years | Team | Apps | (Gls) |
| 2018–2021 | VfL Wolfsburg II | 38 | (1) |
| 2021–2023 | VfL Osnabrück | 19 | (0) |
| 2023–2024 | Wuppertaler SV | 21 | (0) |
| 2024– | FC Gießen | 57 | (1) |

International career
| 2014–2015 | Germany U16 | 8 | (0) |
| 2015–2016 | Germany U17 | 8 | (0) |
| 2017–2018 | Germany U19 | 4 | (0) |
| 2018–2019 | Germany U20 | 4 | (0) |
- * Club domestic league appearances and goals as of 30 June 2026

Davide-Jerome Itter (born 5 January 1999) is a German professional footballer who plays as a right-back or right midfielder for Regionalliga Südwest club FC Gießen.

== Early and personal life ==
Itter was born in Gießen. He is the twin brother of fellow professional footballer Gian-Luca Itter, the son of former amateur player Frank Itter and grandson of Oswald Itter, who played for FC Cleeberg before his career was ended by a meniscus injury, aged 18.

== Club career ==
Itter played youth football for FC Cleeberg, Eintracht Frankfurt and VfL Wolfsburg alongside his twin brother Gian-Luca. He made his senior debut for VfL Wolfsburg II in 2018 and scored once in 38 appearances for the reserve side across three seasons. in June 2021, he signed for 3. Liga club VfL Osnabrück on a two-year contract.

== International career ==
Itter has represented Germany at under-16, under-17, under-19 and under-20 levels, and was part of their squad for the 2016 UEFA European Under-17 Championship.
