= Niko Semlitsch =

German footballer

Personal information
- Full name: Nikolaus Semlitsch
- Date of birth: 27 November 1946
- Height: 1.78 m (5 ft 10 in)
- Position: Defender

Senior career*
Years	Team	Apps	(Gls)
1964–1969	FSV Steinbach/Taunus		
1969–1970	Kickers Offenbach II		
1970–1974	Kickers Offenbach		
1974–1978	1. FC Saarbrücken		

Managerial career
- 1980–1981: TSG Leihgestern
- 1984–1985: Eintracht Haiger
- 1985–1986: FC 08 Villingen
- 1989: Kickers Offenbach
- 1990–1991: 1. FC Schweinfurt 05
- 1992–1994: SC Neukirchen
- 1995–1997: FSV Frankfurt
- 1997–1998: SG Egelsbach
- 2001–2002: KSV Klein-Karben
- 2003–2005: FSV Frankfurt
- 2007: FSV Steinbach
- 2007–2009: FSV Fernwald
- * Club domestic league appearances and goals

Niko Semlitsch (born 27 November 1946) is a retired German football defender and later manager.
