= Dildar Atmaca =

German footballer (born 2002)

Personal information
- Date of birth: 17 October 2002 (age 24)
- Place of birth: Bielefeld, Germany
- Height: 1.74 m (5 ft 9 in)
- Position: Winger

Team information
- Current team: TSV Steinbach
- Number: 23

Youth career
- –2015: Hannover 96
- 2015–2021: Arminia Bielefeld

Senior career*
Years	Team	Apps	(Gls)
2021–2022	Würzburger Kickers	10	(0)
2022–2023	Preußen Münster II	7	(1)
2022–2023	Preußen Münster	4	(0)
2023–2024	1. FC Bocholt	19	(1)
2024–2026	Wuppertaler SV	28	(4)
2026–	TSV Steinbach	8	(1)
- * Club domestic league appearances and goals as of 24 September 2026

Dildar Atmaca (born 17 October 2002) is a German footballer who plays as a winger for TSV Steinbach.

== Career statistics ==
As of match played 30 April 2022

Appearances and goals by club, season and competition
Club	Season	League			Cup		Other		Total	
Club	Season	Division	Apps	Goals	Apps	Goals	Apps	Goals	Apps	Goals
Würzburger Kickers	2021–22	3. Liga	10	0	0	0	1 (Note: Appearances in the Bavarian Cup)	0	11	0
Career total			10	0	0	0	1	0	11	0
