= Michael Fink (footballer) =

German footballer and manager (born 1982)

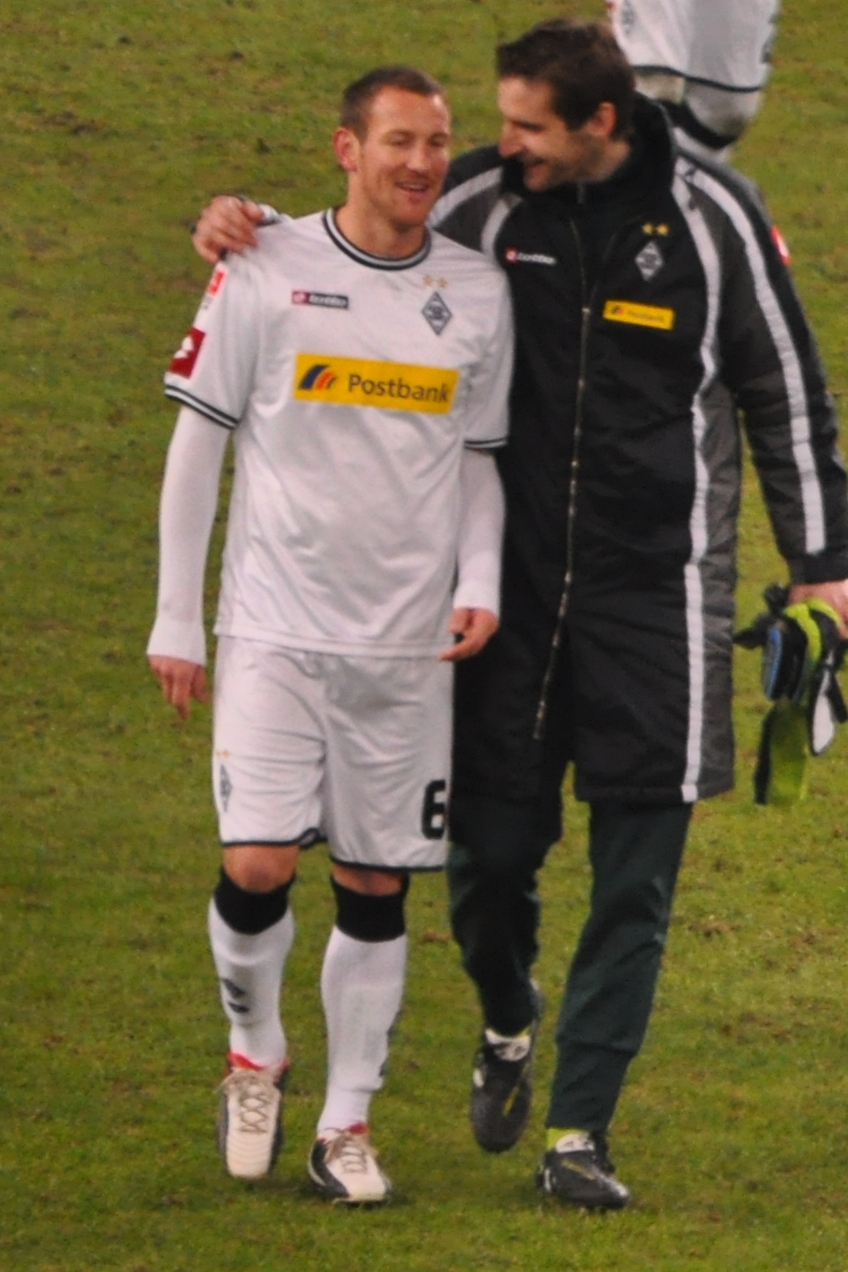
- Fink (left) and Christofer Heimeroth with Borussia Mönchengladbach in 2011

Personal information
- Date of birth: 1 February 1982 (age 44)
- Place of birth: Waiblingen, West Germany
- Height: 1.83 m (6 ft 0 in)
- Position: Defensive midfielder

Team information
- Current team: FC Gießen (player-coach)
- Number: 13

Youth career
- –1990: VfR Waiblingen
- 1990–1992: SV Fellbach
- 1992–2001: VfB Stuttgart

Senior career*
Years	Team	Apps	(Gls)
2001–2004	VfB Stuttgart II	93	(7)
2004–2005	Arminia Bielefeld II	11	(1)
2004–2006	Arminia Bielefeld	44	(4)
2006–2009	Eintracht Frankfurt	87	(8)
2009–2011	Beşiktaş	35	(2)
2011	→ Borussia Mönchengladbach (loan)	6	(0)
2011–2012	Samsunspor	31	(1)
2012–2015	Erzgebirge Aue	73	(3)
2015–2017	Waldhof Mannheim	68	(4)
2017–2018	FC Hanau 93	20	(5)
2018–2019	FC Gießen	32	(6)
2019–2020	FC Hanau 93	33	(1)
2021–	FC Gießen	141	(11)

Managerial career
- 2015–2017: Waldhof Mannheim (assistant)
- 2017–2018: Waldhof Mannheim
- 2019–2021: FC Hanau 93
- 2021–2024: FC Gießen (assistant)
- 2024–: FC Gießen
- * Club domestic league appearances and goals as of 30 June 2026

Michael Fink (born 1 February 1982) is a German professional football manager and player who currently plays for and is head coach of Regionalliga club FC Gießen.

== Career ==
=== Early years ===
Born in Waiblingen, Fink joined VfB Stuttgart's youth system in 1992. He enjoyed early success, winning the German Under 17 Bundesliga in 1999 and the German Youth Cup with the under-19 team in 2001, alongside Kevin Kurányi. Fink later progressed to Stuttgart's reserve team, competing in the Regionalliga Süd.

In the 2004–05 season, he signed with Arminia Bielefeld for their Bundesliga campaign. After making 11 appearances in his debut season, he became a regular the following year, featuring in 33 matches and scoring four goals, including one in the DFB-Pokal.

=== Eintracht Frankfurt ===
Fink left Arminia Bielefeld after the 2005–06 season to join Eintracht Frankfurt.

In January 2008, he scored a bicycle kick goal in a friendly against Paderborn that won the Goal of the month award.

On 29 November 2008, there were reports linking Fink with a return to Stuttgart in the press.

Eintracht Frankfurt press officer Carsten Knoop confirmed that Fink would be leaving at the end of the season.

=== Beşiktaş ===
Fink joined Turkish side Beşiktaş for €1.2 million transfer fee on a three-year contract.

Fink had his pro-competitive match debut in the Super Cup, in which Beşiktaş had lost 2–0 against Fenerbahçe. Fink played a full 90 minutes in a 1–0 away victory at Manchester United.

He scored his second goal against Fenerbahçe and this goal is opted for the best goal of the first part of 2009–10 season by his teammates. He scored his first goal for Beşiktaş at his "league debut" match against İstanbul BB on 7 August 2009, it was also the season's first goal at Süper Lig.

=== Borussia Mönchengladbach ===
Fink returned to Germany on loan to Borussia Mönchengladbach in the Bundesliga.

== Coaching career ==
From 2015 to 2017, Fink served as a player-assistant coach at Waldhof Mannheim, also captaining the team during the 2016–17 season. At the start of the 2017–18 season, he retired from professional playing and extended his contract as assistant coach until 2019.

On 16 October 2017, Waldhof Mannheim dismissed head coach and sporting director Gerd Dais. Fink briefly took over as interim manager, but the Regionalliga Südwest denied his request to continue as head coach until the end of the season due to his lack of a required coaching license. As a result, Bernhard Trares was appointed head coach on 4 January 2018, and Fink ended his collaboration with the club at his own request.

From February 2018, Fink took charge of establishing and leading the newly created scouting department at FC Gießen. He also joined the club's Hessenliga squad that season, quickly becoming a regular starter. In May 2019, he served as interim coach for FC Hanau 93, then competing in the Verbandsliga, until the season's conclusion. During the 2019–20 season, he was a player-coach for Hanau 93, which had been promoted to the Hessenliga. In early 2020, Fink returned to FC Gießen in the Regionalliga, signing a one-year contract as a playing assistant coach. This role was extended for an additional two years in April 2021.

On 2 September 2024, following head coach Daniyel Cimen's departure to league rivals SG Barockstadt, Fink took over as playing head coach of the club, recently promoted to the Regionalliga again.

== Managerial statistics ==
As of match played 30 November 2024

Managerial record by team and tenure
Team	From	To	Record								Ref.
Team	From	To	G	W	D	L	GF	GA	GD	Win %	Ref.
Waldhof Mannheim	16 October 2017	4 January 2018	10	7	2	1	17	8	+9	70.00	
FC Hanau 93	9 May 2019	30 June 2021	38	16	7	15	64	66	−2	42.11	
FC Gießen	2 September 2024	Present	14	2	3	9	17	29	−12	14.29	
Total			62	25	12	25	98	103	−5	40.32	—
