= Ansgar Knauff =

German footballer (born 2002)

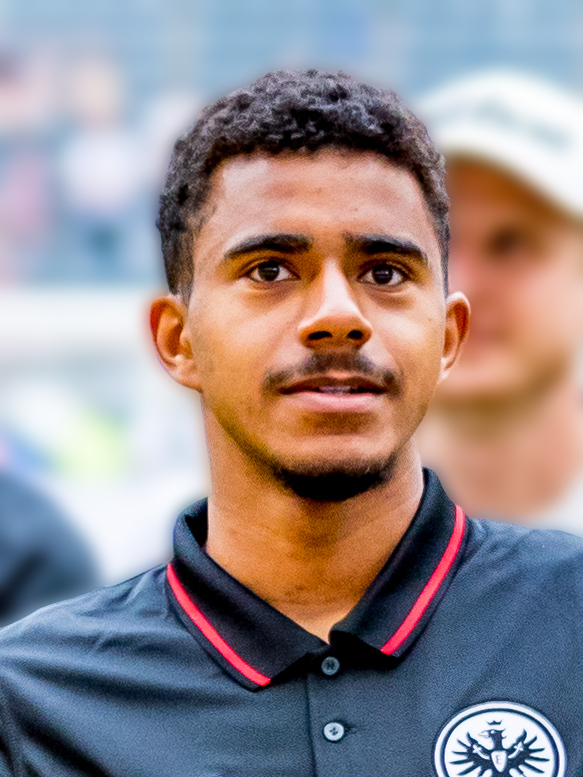
- Knauff playing for Eintracht Frankfurt in 2022

Personal information
- Full name: Ansgar Knauff
- Date of birth: 10 January 2002 (age 24)
- Place of birth: Göttingen, Germany
- Height: 1.80 m (5 ft 11 in)
- Position: Winger

Team information
- Current team: Eintracht Frankfurt
- Number: 7

Youth career
- 2006–2015: SVG Göttingen
- 2015–2016: Hannover 96
- 2016–2020: Borussia Dortmund

Senior career*
Years	Team	Apps	(Gls)
2020	Borussia Dortmund II	36	(10)
2020–2023	Borussia Dortmund	9	(1)
2022–2023	→ Eintracht Frankfurt (loan)	36	(2)
2023–	Eintracht Frankfurt	92	(15)

International career^{‡}
2020	Germany U19	1	(0)
2021	Germany U20	3	(0)
2021–2025	Germany U21	30	(4)
Medal record
Men's football
Representing Germany
UEFA European Under-21 Championship
Runner-up	2025 Slovakia
- * Club domestic league appearances and goals as of 20:30, 24 October 2026 (UTC) ‡ National team caps and goals as of 10:12, 29 June 2025 (UTC)

Ansgar Knauff (German pronunciation: [ˈansɡaʁ ˈknaʊ̯f]; born 10 January 2002) is a German professional footballer who plays as a right winger for Bundesliga club Eintracht Frankfurt.

== Early life ==
Knauff was born in Göttingen to a German mother and a Ghanaian father, but raised by his single mother.

== Club career ==
He began his youth career at hometown club SVG Göttingen, before joining Hannover 96's youth academy in 2015. A year later, he joined the Borussia Dortmund youth team, in which he played in the 2019–20 UEFA Youth League. In September 2020, he made his debut for Borussia Dortmund II in the fourth division of German football. During the 2020–21 Regionalliga West season, he appeared in 28 games for Dortmund II, scoring 9 goals.

=== Borussia Dortmund ===
Knauff signed his first professional contract with Borussia Dortmund on 25 November 2020, lasting until 2023. He made his first team debut on 8 December, coming on as a substitute in the 83rd minute for Thorgan Hazard in the 2020–21 UEFA Champions League match against Zenit Saint Petersburg. The away match finished as a 2–1 win for Dortmund. On 20 March 2021, he made his first appearance in the Bundesliga, coming on for Thomas Meunier in the 80th minute and providing the assist for a late equalizer in a 2-2 draw against Köln. He scored his first Bundesliga goal on 10 April, scoring the winning goal in a 3–2 victory against VfB Stuttgart.

=== Eintracht Frankfurt ===
On 20 January 2022, Knauff joined Eintracht Frankfurt on an eighteen-month loan deal. Sebastian Kehl, Dortmund's head of playing department, explained the move by stating that "He approached us to state his wish to get more playing time on loan. We would like to offer him this chance to continue his development at a high level." Knauff scored his first goal for Eintracht on 5 March in a 4–1 victory against Hertha BSC. In the knockout phase of the Europa League campaign, he was an undisputed starter, did not miss a single minute of playing time, and scored important goals against FC Barcelona in the quarter-final and West Ham in the semifinal. On 18 May 2022, he appeared as a starting player in the 2022 UEFA Europa League Final against Rangers and won the Europa League trophy with his club after the penalty shoot-out. For his performance during the 2021–22 Europa League season, Knauff was awarded the Young Player of the Season award by UEFA. On 9 June 2023, he permanently moved to Frankfurt. On 18 September 2025, Knauff scored his first Champions League goal in a 5–1 win over Galatsaray. On 9 December, he scored the opener in an eventual 1–2 loss to FC Barcelona in the Champions League league phase.

== Career statistics ==
As of match played 24 October 2026

Appearances and goals by club, season and competition
Club	Season	League			DFB-Pokal		Europe		Other		Total	
Club	Season	Division	Apps	Goals	Apps	Goals	Apps	Goals	Apps	Goals	Apps	Goals
Borussia Dortmund II	2020–21	Regionalliga West	28	9	—		—		—		28	9
Borussia Dortmund II	2021–22	3. Liga	8	1	—		—		—		8	1
Borussia Dortmund II	Total		36	10	—		—		—		36	10
Borussia Dortmund	2020–21	Bundesliga	4	1	0	0	3 (Note: Appearances in UEFA Champions League)	0	0	0	7	1
Borussia Dortmund	2021–22	Bundesliga	5	0	1	0	3	0	0	0	9	0
Borussia Dortmund	Total		9	1	1	0	6	0	0	0	16	1
Eintracht Frankfurt (loan)	2021–22	Bundesliga	12	1	—		7 (Note: Appearances in UEFA Europa League)	2	—		19	3
Eintracht Frankfurt (loan)	2022–23	Bundesliga	24	1	2	0	6	0	1 (Note: Appearance in UEFA Super Cup)	0	33	1
Eintracht Frankfurt	2023–24	Bundesliga	31	7	1	1	8 (Note: Appearances in UEFA Europa Conference League)	0	—		40	8
Eintracht Frankfurt	2024–25	Bundesliga	29	4	3	0	11	2	—		43	6
Eintracht Frankfurt	2025–26	Bundesliga	28	4	2	1	8	2	—		38	7
Eintracht Frankfurt	2026–27	Bundesliga	4	0	1	0	—		—		5	0
Eintracht Frankfurt	Frankfurt total		128	17	9	2	40	6	1	0	178	25
Career total			173	28	10	2	46	6	1	0	230	36

== Honours ==
Borussia Dortmund

- DFB-Pokal: 2020–21

Eintracht Frankfurt

- UEFA Europa League: 2021–22
- UEFA Super Cup runner-up: 2022
- DFB-Pokal runner-up: 2022–23

Germany U21

- UEFA European Under-21 Championship runner-up: 2025

Individual

- Fritz Walter Medal U19 Silver: 2021
- UEFA Europa League Young Player of the Season: 2021–22
