= TSV Steinbach Haiger =

German association football club

- Full name: Turn- und Sportverein Steinbach 1921 e.V.
- Founded: 1921; 105 years ago
- Ground: SIBRE-Sportzentrum Haarwasen Haiger
- Capacity: 4,970 (600 seated)
- Manager: Hüsni Tahiri
- League: Regionalliga Südwest (IV)
- 2025–26: Regionalliga Südwest, 5th of 18
- Website: http://www.tsv-steinbach.de
Home colours	Away colours

TSV Steinbach Haiger is a German association football club based in Steinbach, near Haiger, Hesse.

The club's greatest success has been to earn promotion to the tier four Regionalliga Südwest in 2015.

== History ==
For most of its history the club was a non-descript amateur side in local football. The club had a brief spell in the Bezirksklasse in the 1980s but quickly returned to the local A- and B- Klasse.

The rise of TSV Steinbach began in the mid-2000s. After relegation from the tier eight Kreisliga A, the club spent four seasons in the Kreisliga B before starting its impressive run of five promotions in six seasons. The club won the Kreisliga B in 2009, followed by a title in the Kreisliga A in 2010. TSV Steinbach finished runners-up in the Kreisoberliga in 2010 but was still promoted, followed by another championship in 2012, now in the Gruppenliga. In the Verbandsliga Hessen-Mitte TSV's rise came to a temporary halt in 2012–13 when the club came only seventh. The following season however, 2013–14, the club won its Verbandsliga division and earned promotion to the Hessenliga for the first time.

In the 2014–15 season, TSV Steinbach played in the Hessenliga where it won another championship and earned promotion to the Regionalliga Südwest.

For the 2018–19 season, the club was renamed from TSV Steinbach to TSV Steinbach Haiger.

== Current squad ==
As of 8 September 2026

Note: Flags indicate national team as defined under FIFA eligibility rules; some limited exceptions apply. Players may hold more than one non-FIFA nationality.

No.	Pos.	Nation	Player
1	GK	GER	Mike Dreier
2	DF	GER	Tjark Hildebrandt
3	DF	GER	Nick Galle
4	DF	GER	Levi Mentzel (on loan from Fortuna Düsseldorf)
5	DF	GER	Dawyn-Paul Donner
6	MF	GER	Lukas Näpflein
7	FW	GER	Marvin Mika
8	MF	GER	Levin Müller
9	FW	ALB	Ertan Hajdaraj
10	MF	KOS	Bleron Krasniqi
11	MF	GER	Serkan Fırat
15	MF	GER	Marco Müller
17	DF	GER	Thomas Rotfuß

No.	Pos.	Nation	Player
18	MF	GER	Leon Wirtz
19	DF	GER	Tim Kirchner
20	FW	GER	Jakob Pfahl
21	FW	GER	Kevin Gleissner
23	FW	GER	Dildar Atmaca
24	GK	TUR	Tyler Doğan
26	FW	GER	Deniz Bindemann
27	FW	GER	Till Hausotter
28	MF	GER	Ole Käuper
29	MF	GER	Luca Spangenberger
30	MF	GER	Jahn Herrmann
33	DF	GER	Max Lippert
39	GK	GER	Kevin Ibrahim

== Honours ==
The club's honours:

- Hessenliga
  - Champions: 2015
- Verbandsliga Hessen-Mitte
  - Champions: 2014
- Gruppenliga Gießen-Marburg
  - Champions: 2012
- Kreisoberliga West
  - Runners-up: 2011
- Kreisliga A Dillenburg
  - Champions: 2010
- Kreisliga B Dillenburg-Nord
  - Champions: 2009
- Hessian Cup
  - Champions: 2018, 2020

== Recent seasons ==
The recent season-by-season performance of the club:

Season	Division	Tier	Position
2004–05	Kreisliga A Dillenburg-Biedenkopf	VIII	18th ↓
2005–06	Kreisliga B Dillenburg 1	IX	10th
2006–07	Kreisliga B Dillenburg 1	IX	8th
2007–08	Kreisliga B Dillenburg-Nord	IX	4th
2008–09	Kreisliga B Dillenburg-Nord	X	1st ↑
2009–10	Kreisliga A Dillenburg	IX	1st ↑
2010–11	Kreisoberliga West	VIII	2nd ↑
2011–12	Gruppenliga Gießen-Marburg	VII	1st ↑
2012–13	Verbandsliga Hessen-Mitte	VI	7th
2013–14	Verbandsliga Hessen-Mitte	VI	1st ↑
2014–15	Hessenliga	V	1st ↑
2015–16	Regionalliga Südwest	IV	12th
2016–17	Regionalliga Südwest	IV	5th
2017–18	Regionalliga Südwest	IV	8th
2018–19	Regionalliga Südwest	IV	8th
2019–20	Regionalliga Südwest	IV	3rd
2020–21	Regionalliga Südwest	IV	2nd
2021–22	Regionalliga Südwest	IV	4th
2022–23	Regionalliga Südwest	IV	2nd
2023–24	Regionalliga Südwest	IV	12th
2024–25	Regionalliga Südwest	IV	4th
2025–26	Regionalliga Südwest	IV	5th

- With the introduction of the Regionalligas in 1994 and the 3. Liga in 2008 as the new third tier, below the 2. Bundesliga, all leagues below dropped one tier.

Key

↑ Promoted	↓ Relegated
