= SV Rot-Weiß Hadamar =

German football club

- Full name: Sportverein Rot-Weiß Hadamar e.V.
- Founded: 1 July 2012
- Ground: Sportzplatz Hadamar
- Capacity: 1,500
- Chairman: Rainer Druck
- Manager: Walter Reitz
- League: Hessenliga (V)
- 2025–26: Verbandsliga Hessen-Mitte, 1st of 18 (promoted)
Home colours	Away colours

SV Rot-Weiß Hadamar is a German football club from the city of Hadamar in Hesse.

== History ==
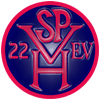
Former logo of SpVgg Hadamar

The club was formed on 1 July 2012 through the merger of SpVgg Hadamar and SC Rot-Weiß Niederhadamar; SpVgg Hadamar was formed on 25 June 1922 through the merger of several smaller local clubs. On 25 May 1960, the gymnastics club SpVgg 06 Hadamar became part of SpVgg 1922. In addition to the footballers, there are departments for gymnastics, table tennis and running.

Through the early 2000s, the club worked to advance and won eventually promotion to the Bezirksoberliga in 2007 and then the Verbandsliga Hessen-Mitte in 2009. Two years later they advanced to the Hessenliga (V) for the first time. The second team side currently plays in the Kreisklasse B (IX).

== Honours ==
The club's honours:

- Verbandsliga Hessen-Mitte
  - Champions: 2011, 2026
- Gruppenliga Wiesbaden
  - Champions: 2009
- Bezirksliga Limburg-Weilburg
  - Champions: 2007

== Recent managers ==
Recent managers of the club:

Manager	Start	Finish
Heiko Weidenfeller	1 July 2008	present

== Recent seasons ==
The recent season-by-season performance of the club:

Season	Division	Tier	Position
2003–04	Bezirksoberliga Wiesbaden	VI	6th
2004–05	Bezirksoberliga Wiesbaden	VI	9th
2005–06	Bezirksoberliga Wiesbaden	VI	12th ↓
2006–07	Bezirksliga Limburg-Weilburg	VII	1st ↑
2007–08	Bezirksoberliga Wiesbaden	VI	5th
2008–09	Gruppenliga Wiesbaden	VII	1st ↑
2009–10	Verbandsliga Hessen-Mitte	VI	9th
2010–11	Verbandsliga Hessen-Mitte	VI	1st ↑
2011–12	Hessenliga	V	13th
2012–13	Hessenliga	V	4th
2013–14	Hessenliga	V	6th
2014–15	Hessenliga	V	3rd
2015–16	Hessenliga	V	10th
2016–17	Hessenliga	V	

- With the introduction of the Regionalligas in 1994 and the 3. Liga in 2008 as the new third tier, below the 2. Bundesliga, all leagues below dropped one tier. Also in 2008, a large number of football leagues in Hesse were renamed, with the Oberliga Hessen becoming the Hessenliga, the Landesliga becoming the Verbandsliga, the Bezirksoberliga becoming the Gruppenliga and the Bezirksliga becoming the Kreisoberliga.

↑ Promoted	↓ Relegated
