= Serkan Fırat =

German-Turkish footballer

Personal information
- Full name: Serkan Fırat
- Date of birth: 2 May 1994 (age 32)
- Place of birth: Germany
- Height: 1.75 m (5 ft 9 in)
- Position: Midfielder

Team information
- Current team: TSV Steinbach
- Number: 11

Youth career
- –2010: TG 08 Ober-Roden
- 2010–2013: Darmstadt 98

Senior career*
Years	Team	Apps	(Gls)
2012–2014	Darmstadt 98 II	2	(0)
2013–2015	Darmstadt 98	1	(0)
2015–2016	Viktoria Griesheim	19	(14)
2016–2019	Kickers Offenbach	103	(27)
2019	Bayern Alzenau	18	(6)
2020–2022	Kickers Offenbach	73	(8)
2022–	TSV Steinbach	134	(27)
- * Club domestic league appearances and goals as of 24 September 2026

Serkan Fırat (born 2 May 1994) is a German-Turkish footballer who plays as a midfielder for TSV Steinbach.

== Career ==
Fırat made his professional debut for Darmstadt 98 in the 3. Liga on 20 December 2013, coming on as a substitute in the 89th minute for Marcel Heller in the 3–0 away win against SV Elversberg.
