= FSV Braunfels =

German football club

- Full name: Fussball Spielverein Braunfels von 1918 e.V.
- Nickname(s): Schlossherren (Lords of the castle)
- Founded: 1918; 107 years ago
- Ground: Stadion Schloßblick
- Capacity: 5,000
- Chairman: Hans-Joachim Eich
- Manager: Harry Preuss
- League: Verbandsliga Hessen-Mitte (VI)
- 2015–16: 10th
Home colours	Away colours

FSV Braunfels is a German association football club established in 1918 in Braunfels, Hesse.

== History ==
To date the club's greatest successes have been promotions to the Oberliga Hessen (IV) for single season turns in 1999–2000 and 2003–04. After a second-place finish in the Landesliga Hessen-Mitte in 2006 and success in the subsequent promotion rounds, the club again returned to the Oberliga for a season, being imideateley relegated again. It made another return to the Hessenliga in 2012 but was once more relegated after only one year.

FSV currently has a membership of 600.

== Honours ==
The club's honours:

- Landesliga Hessen-Mitte
  - Champions: 2003
  - Runners-up: 1999, 2006
- Verbandsliga Hessen-Mitte
  - Champions: 2012

== Recent seasons ==
The recent season-by-season performance of the club:

Season	Division	Tier	Position
1999–2000	Oberliga Hessen	IV	17th ↓
2000–01	Landesliga Hessen-Mitte	V	4th
2001–02	Landesliga Hessen-Mitte	V	4th
2002–03	Landesliga Hessen-Mitte	V	1st ↑
2003–04	Oberliga Hessen	IV	16th ↓
2004–05	Landesliga Hessen-Mitte	V	4th
2005–06	Landesliga Hessen-Mitte	V	2nd ↑
2006–07	Oberliga Hessen	IV	18th ↓
2007–08	Landesliga Hessen-Mitte	V	6th
2008–09	Verbandsliga Hessen-Mitte	VI	11th
2009–10	Verbandsliga Hessen-Mitte	VI	4th
2010–11	Verbandsliga Hessen-Mitte	VI	3rd
2011–12	Verbandsliga Hessen-Mitte	VI	1st ↑
2012–13	Hessenliga	V	16th ↓
2013–14	Verbandsliga Hessen-Mitte	VI	7th
2014–15	Verbandsliga Hessen-Mitte	VI	10th
2015–16	Verbandsliga Hessen-Mitte	VI	10th
2016–17	Verbandsliga Hessen-Mitte	VI	

- With the introduction of the Regionalligas in 1994 and the 3. Liga in 2008 as the new third tier, below the 2. Bundesliga, all leagues below dropped one tier. Also in 2008, a large number of football leagues in Hesse were renamed, with the Oberliga Hessen becoming the Hessenliga, the Landesliga becoming the Verbandsliga, the Bezirksoberliga becoming the Gruppenliga and the Bezirksliga becoming the Kreisoberliga.

↑ Promoted	↓ Relegated

== Stadium ==
Braunfels plays its home matches at the Stadion Schloßblick which has a capacity of 5,000 (~500 seats).
