= Sidney Raebiger =

German footballer (born 2005)

Personal information
- Full name: Lars Sidney Raebiger
- Date of birth: 17 April 2005 (age 21)
- Place of birth: Freiberg, Germany
- Height: 1.76 m (5 ft 9 in)
- Position: Midfielder

Team information
- Current team: Eintracht Braunschweig
- Number: 37

Youth career
- 2009–2012: Brand-Erbisdorf
- 2012–2015: Fortuna Langenau
- 2015–2021: RB Leipzig

Senior career*
Years	Team	Apps	(Gls)
2021–2022	RB Leipzig	1	(0)
2022–2023	Greuther Fürth II	8	(3)
2022–2023	Greuther Fürth	31	(5)
2023–2024	Eintracht Frankfurt	0	(0)
2023–2024	Eintracht Frankfurt II	20	(2)
2024–	Eintracht Braunschweig	8	(0)

International career^{‡}
2020	Germany U16	2	(0)
- * Club domestic league appearances and goals as of 18 May 2026 ‡ National team caps and goals as of 15:26, 1 September 2023 (UTC)

Lars Sidney Raebiger (born 17 April 2005) is a German professional footballer who plays as a midfielder for 2. Bundesliga club Eintracht Braunschweig.

== Club career ==
A youth product of Brand-Erbisdorf and Fortuna Langenau, Raebiger joined the youth academy of RB Leipzig in 2015. In 2021, he signed his first professional contract with the club and started training with their senior players. He made his professional debut with RB Leipzig in a 4–0 DFB-Pokal win over Sandhausen on 7 August 2021. At 16 years and 112 days old, he is the youngest ever debutant in RB Leipzig's history.

On 20 June 2022, Raebiger was transferred to recently relegated Greuther Fürth, signing a three-year contract with the 2. Bundesliga club. On 1 September 2023, he transferred to Eintracht Frankfurt.

On 7 June 2024, Raebiger signed a three-year contract with Eintracht Braunschweig.

== International career ==
Raebiger is a youth international for Germany, having represented the Germany U16s.
