= SC Waldgirmes =

German football club

- Full name: Sport Club 1929 Waldgirmes e.V.
- Founded: 1929
- Ground: Stadion in den Lahnauen
- Capacity: 2,000
- Chairman: Wolfgang Schmitt
- Manager: Peter Bätzel
- League: Verbandsliga Hessen-Mitte (VI)
- 2025–26: Oberliga Hessen (V), 16th of 18 (relegated)
Home colours	Away colours

SC Waldgirmes is a German association football club from Waldgirmes, Hesse. The 700 member club is best known for its football team, but also has departments for table tennis, women's gymnastics, alpine gymnastics, and cycling.

== History ==
The association was founded in 1929 as SG Waldgirmes. As a worker's side the club was banned for political reasons when the Nazis came to power in 1933 and a number of the footballers left for TV 05 Waldgirmes where they formed a football department. After World War II occupying Allied authorities banned all organizations in the country including sports and football associations. SG Waldgirmes was re-established in the summer of 1945 as a general community sports association. In 1948 the football side went its own way as the independent club FC Waldgirmes until being re-united with its parent in 1952 to form SC Waldgirmes.

The footballers were promoted to Landesliga Hessen-Mitte in 1970 and played at that level over the next three decades with the exception of single season demotions in 1975 and 1993. In 2002 Waldgirmes earned promotion to the Oberliga Hessen (IV) after capturing their first Landesliga (V) title. They were relegated after a last place finish but immediately won their way back to fourth tier Oberliga play the next season, where they archived good results in the following season. In 2008–09, the club won the Oberliga but decided not to apply for a Regionalliga licence and remained at this level. In 2012–13 the club finished 14th in the league and was relegated after coming last in the relegation/promotion round.

== Honours ==
The club's honours:

- Hessenliga (V)
  - Champions: 2009
  - Runners-up: 2010, 2011
- Landesliga Hessen-Mitte (V)
  - Champions: 2002, 2004

== Recent managers ==
Recent managers of the club:

Manager	Start	Finish
Thorsten Krick	1 July 2006	present

== Recent seasons ==
The recent season-by-season performance of the club:

Season	Division	Tier	Position
1999–2000	Landesliga Hessen-Mitte	V	9th
2000–01	Landesliga Hessen-Mitte	V	12th
2001–02	Landesliga Hessen-Mitte	V	1st ↑
2002–03	Oberliga Hessen	IV	18th ↓
2003–04	Landesliga Hessen-Mitte	V	1st ↑
2004–05	Oberliga Hessen	IV	3rd
2005–06	Oberliga Hessen	IV	3rd
2006–07	Oberliga Hessen	IV	3rd
2007–08	Oberliga Hessen	IV	5th
2008–09	Hessenliga	V	1st
2009–10	Hessenliga	V	2nd
2010–11	Hessenliga	V	2nd
2011–12	Hessenliga	V	14th
2012–13	Hessenliga	V	14th ↓
2013–14	Verbandsliga Hessen-Mitte	VI	4th
2014–15	Verbandsliga Hessen-Mitte	VI	3rd
2015–16	Verbandsliga Hessen-Mitte	VI	3rd
2016–17	Verbandsliga Hessen-Mitte	VI	

- With the introduction of the Regionalligas in 1994 and the 3. Liga in 2008 as the new third tier, below the 2. Bundesliga, all leagues below dropped one tier. Also in 2008, a large number of football leagues in Hesse were renamed, with the Oberliga Hessen becoming the Hessenliga, the Landesliga becoming the Verbandsliga, the Bezirksoberliga becoming the Gruppenliga and the Bezirksliga becoming the Kreisoberliga.

↑ Promoted	↓ Relegated
