= Waldstadion (Giessen) =

Stadium in Giessen, Germany

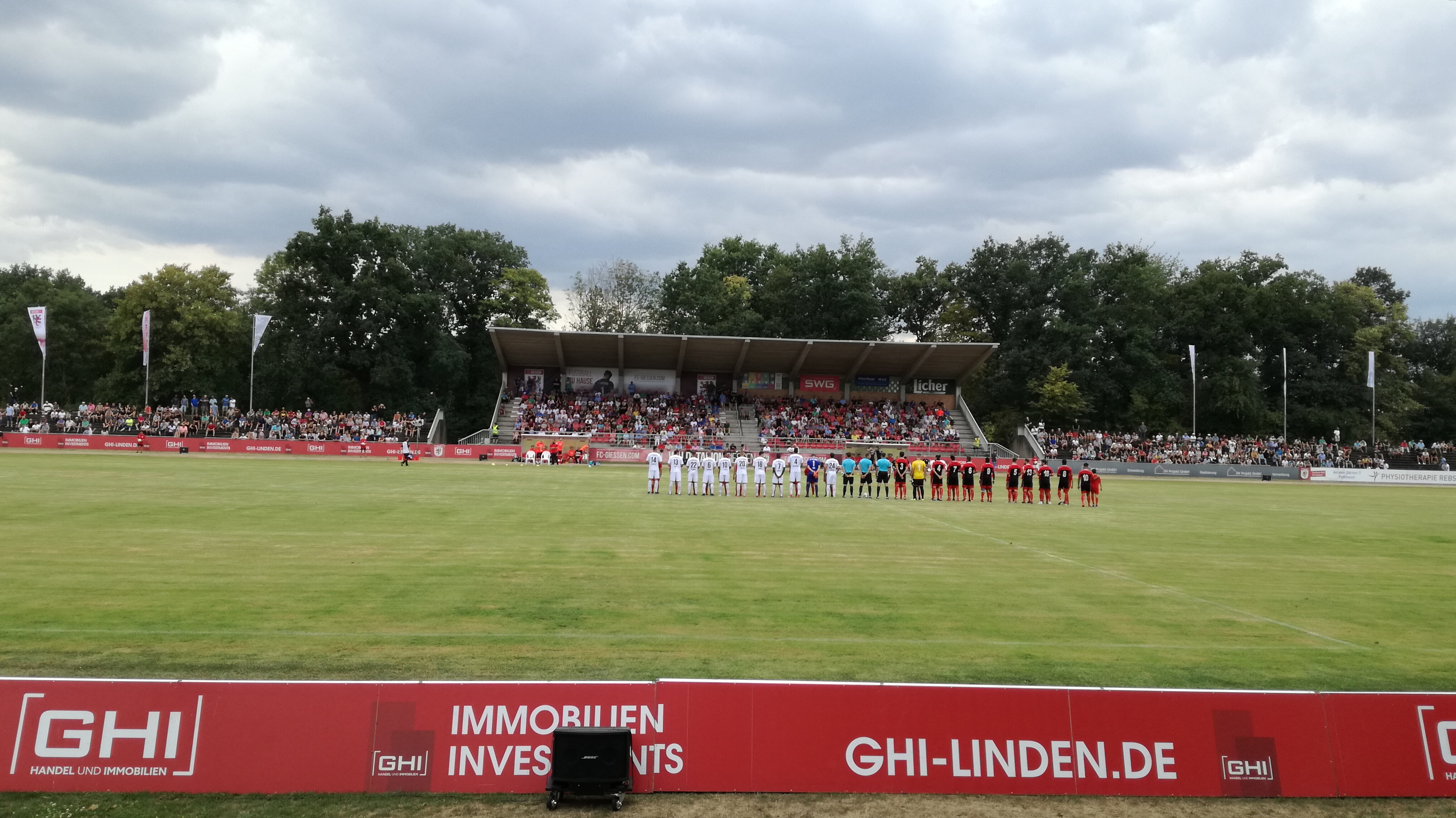
- Interactive map of Waldstadion
- Full name: Waldstadion
- Location: Giessen, Germany
- Coordinates: 50°35′8″N 8°42′16″E
- Capacity: 4,999

Construction
- Built: 1925

Tenant
- FC Gießen

Waldstadion (German pronunciation: [ˈvaltˌʃtaːdi̯ɔn]) is a 4,999-capacity stadium located in Giessen, Germany. It is home to FC Gießen. The stadium has also been used for major rock concerts and festivals.
