= FC Gießen =

German football club

- Full name: FC Gießen 1927 Teutonia/1900 VfB e.V.
- Founded: November 1, 1927; 98 years ago
- Ground: Waldstadion
- Capacity: 4,999
- Chairman: Dominik Fischer
- Manager: Michael Fink
- League: Hessenliga (V)
- 2025–26: Hessenliga, 4th of 18
| Home colours | Away colours |

FC Gießen 1927 Teutonia/1900 VfB e.V., commonly known as FC Gießen, is a German association football club from the city of Giessen and the Watzenborn-Steinberg quarter of the town of Pohlheim, both in Hesse. The club's greatest success has been promotion to the tier four Regionalliga Südwest in 2016, 2019, and 2024.

== History ==
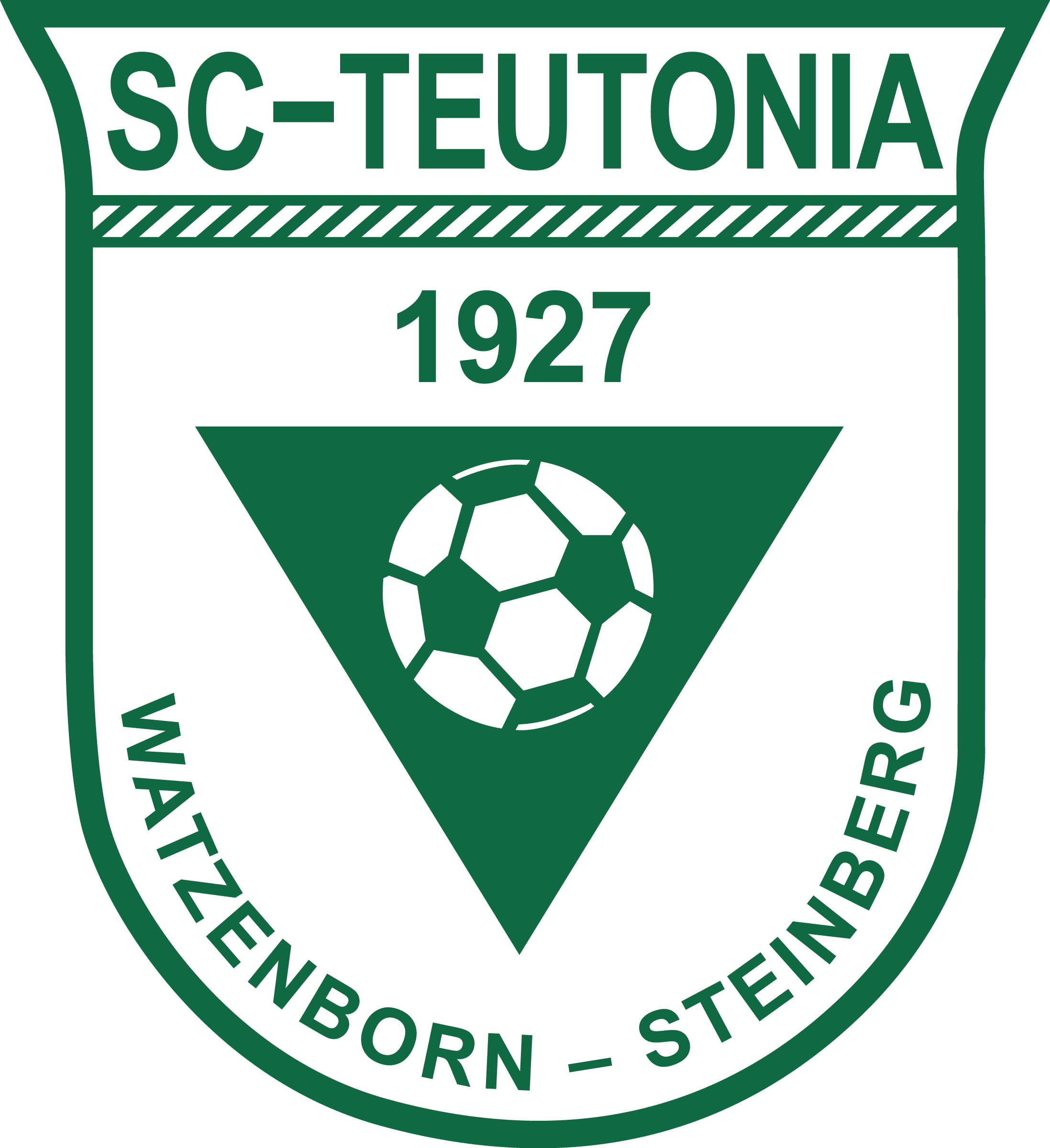
Former logo of Teutonia Watzenborn-Steinberg.

Predecessor club Sportclub Teutonia Watzenborn-Steinberg was formed on 1 November 1927. For much of its history this club played in local amateur leagues.

From the mid-2000s, the club experienced a rise through the league system, reaching the tier five Landesliga Hessen-Mitte in 2006 after a runners-up finish in the Bezirksoberliga Gießen/Marburg. Teutonia played at this level for two seasons before being relegated again in 2008. It returned to what had now been renamed the Gruppenliga Gießen/Marburg, where it played for the next three seasons. A league championship in 2011 took it back up to the Verbandsliga Hessen-Mitte, the former Landesliga. It played at Verbandsliga level for the next four seasons before winning the league in 2015 and earning promotion to the Hessenliga for the first time. Winning the league in 2015–16 Teutonia earned another promotion, now to the Regionalliga Südwest, from which the club was relegated one season later.

Teutonia was renamed FC Gießen on 1 July 2018 after acquiring VfB Gießen's football department. VfB announced its closure earlier in March. FC won another Hessenliga championship in 2019, promoting them to the Regionalliga again.

== Current squad ==
As of 25 January 2025

Note: Flags indicate national team as defined under FIFA eligibility rules; some limited exceptions apply. Players may hold more than one non-FIFA nationality.

| No. | Pos. | Nation | Player |
|---|---|---|---|
| 1 | GK | GER | Bilal Jomaa Zabadne |
| 2 | DF | GER | Rico Kaiser |
| 3 | DF | GER | Maximilian Böger |
| 4 | DF | BUL | Martin Mihaylov |
| 5 | DF | GER | Pietro Besso |
| 6 | MF | GER | Lennox Reichenbächer |
| 7 | MF | GER | Ferdinand Scholl |
| 8 | MF | GER | Lian Akkus Rodríguez |
| 10 | MF | GER | Tolga Duran |
| 13 | MF | GER | Michael Fink |
| 14 | MF | GER | David Siebert |
| 15 | MF | MAR | Yassine Maingad |

| No. | Pos. | Nation | Player |
|---|---|---|---|
| 17 | MF | GER | Nicola Arcanjo-Köhler |
| 20 | MF | GRN | Keanu Hagley |
| 22 | DF | GER | Davide Itter |
| 23 | DF | GER | Wessam Abdel-Ghani |
| 26 | MF | GER | Mohamed Walid Haddou |
| 29 | DF | GER | Ilias Ebnoutalib |
| 30 | FW | GER | Dominik Rummel |
| 33 | GK | GER | Jonas Omar |
| — | GK | SRB | Aleksa Lapcic |
| — | FW | GER | Shako Onangolo |
| — | FW | GER | Oliver Kovacic |

== Honours ==
The club's honours:

- Hessenliga
  - Champions: 2016, 2019, 2024
- Verbandsliga Hessen-Mitte
  - Champions: 2015
- Gruppenliga Gießen/Marburg
  - Champions: 2011

== Recent seasons ==
The recent season-by-season performance of the club:

| Season | Division | Tier | Position |
|---|---|---|---|
| 2003–04 | Bezirksliga Gießen/Marburg-Süd | VII | 1st ↑ |
| 2004–05 | Bezirksoberliga Gießen/Marburg | VI | 7th |
| 2005–06 | Bezirksoberliga Gießen/Marburg | VI | 2nd ↑ |
| 2006–07 | Landesliga Hessen-Mitte | V | 14th |
| 2007–08 | Landesliga Hessen-Mitte | V | 19th ↓ |
| 2008–09 | Gruppenliga Gießen/Marburg | VII | 10th |
| 2009–10 | Gruppenliga Gießen/Marburg | VII | 9th |
| 2010–11 | Gruppenliga Gießen/Marburg | VII | 1st ↑ |
| 2011–12 | Verbandsliga Hessen-Mitte | VI | 12th |
| 2012–13 | Verbandsliga Hessen-Mitte | VI | 9th |
| 2013–14 | Verbandsliga Hessen-Mitte | VI | 14th |
| 2014–15 | Verbandsliga Hessen-Mitte | VI | 1st ↑ |
| 2015–16 | Hessenliga | V | 1st ↑ |
| 2016–17 | Regionalliga Südwest | IV | 17th ↓ |
| 2017–18 | Hessenliga | V | 4th |
| 2018–19 | Hessenliga | V | 1st ↑ |
| 2019–20 | Regionalliga Südwest | IV | |

- With the introduction of the Regionalligas in 1994 and the 3. Liga in 2008 as the new third tier, below the 2. Bundesliga, all leagues below dropped one tier.

| ↑ Promoted | ↓ Relegated |
