= May 28 =

May 28 this year in various calendars
- Thursday, 28 May 2026
| Akan | Monoyaw |
| Armenian | 12 Margach 1475 |
| Aztec | Ochpaniztli 18, 9 Miquiztli |
| Babylonian | 10 Ayaru, 2337 SE |
| Balinese pawukon | Menga, Kajeng, Laba, Keliwon, Maulu, Wraspati of Warigadian, Brahma, Erangan, Manusa |
| Bengali | 14 Joishtho, BS 1433 |
| Chinese | Yang Water Tiger・Horn Mansion; Fire Horse Year, Month 4, Day 12 (Xiaoman, 8 days until Mangzhong) |
| Common Era | 28 May 2026 CE |
| Coptic | 20 Pashons, AM 1742 |
| Egyptian | 12 Phaophi, 2775 NE |
| Ethiopian | 20 Genbot, 2018 Amätä Məhrät |
| French Republican | Décade I, Nonidi de Prairial de l'Année 234 de la République |
| Gregorian | 28 May, AD 2026 |
| Hebrew | 12 Sivan, AM 5786 |
| Hindu | Citrā・Vyatīpāta; Solar: 14 Jyeṣṭha, 1948 SE; Lunisolar: Dvādaśī, Śukla pakṣa of Adhika Jyeṣṭha, 2083 VE; Rāudra・5127 KY・1,872,723 |
| Icelandic | Fimmtudagur, 6 Skerpla 2026 |
| Islamic | 11 Dhu al-Hijjah, AH 1447 (using tabular method) |
| ISO week date | 2026-W22-4 |
| Japanese | 12 Uzuki, Reiwa 8 (Shōman, 9 days until Bōshu) |
| Julian | 15 May, AD 2026 (AM 7534) |
| Julian day | 2461189 |
| Korean | 12 Baemdal, 4359 DE |
| Maya | 13.0.13.11.6; 19 Zip, 9 Cimi |
| Roman | Idibus Maiis, MMDCCLXXIX AUC |
| Solar Hijri | 7 Khordad, SH 1405 |
| Tibetan | 12 sa ga, me pho rta 2153 or 1772 or 1000 |

| << | May | | | | | >> |
| Su | Mo | Tu | We | Th | Fr | Sa |
| | | | | | 1 | 2 |
| 3 | 4 | 5 | 6 | 7 | 8 | 9 |
| 10 | 11 | 12 | 13 | 14 | 15 | 16 |
| 17 | 18 | 19 | 20 | 21 | 22 | 23 |
| 24 | 25 | 26 | 27 | 28 | 29 | 30 |
| 31 |
2026

May 28 in recent years
2026 (Thursday)
2025 (Wednesday)
2024 (Tuesday)
2023 (Sunday)
2022 (Saturday)
2021 (Friday)
2020 (Thursday)
2019 (Tuesday)
2018 (Monday)
2017 (Sunday)

May 28 is the 148th day of the year (149th in leap years) in the Gregorian calendar; 217 days remain until the end of the year.

== Events ==
=== Pre-1600 ===
- 585 BC – A solar eclipse occurs, as predicted by the Greek philosopher and scientist Thales, while Alyattes is battling Cyaxares in the Battle of the Eclipse, leading to a truce. This is one of the cardinal dates from which other dates can be calculated. It is also the earliest event of which the precise date is known.
- 621 – Battle of Hulao: Li Shimin, the son of the Chinese emperor Gaozu, defeats the numerically superior forces of Dou Jiande near the Hulao Pass (Henan). This victory decides the outcome of the civil war that followed the Sui dynasty's collapse in favour of the Tang dynasty.
- 934 – English king Æthelstan begins his invasion of Scotland.
- 1242 – Avignonet massacre: A group of Cathars, with the probable connivance of Count Raymond VII of Toulouse, murder the inquisitor William Arnaud and eleven of his companions.
- 1347 – Marriage of Byzantine Emperor John V Palaiologos and Helena Kantakouzene.
- 1533 – The Archbishop of Canterbury, Thomas Cranmer, declares the marriage of King Henry VIII of England to Anne Boleyn valid.
- 1588 – The Spanish Armada, with 130 ships and 30,000 men, sets sail from Lisbon, Portugal, heading for the English Channel. (It will take until May 30 for all ships to leave port.)

=== 1601–1900 ===
- 1644 – English Civil War: Bolton Massacre by Royalist troops under the command of James Stanley, 7th Earl of Derby.
- 1754 – French and Indian War: In the first engagement of the war, Virginia militia under the 22-year-old Lieutenant colonel George Washington defeat a French reconnaissance party in the Battle of Jumonville Glen in what is now Fayette County in southwestern Pennsylvania.
- 1802 – In Guadeloupe, 400 rebellious slaves, led by Louis Delgrès, blow themselves up rather than submit to Napoleon's troops.
- 1830 – U.S. President Andrew Jackson signs the Indian Removal Act which denies Native Americans their land rights and forcibly relocates them.
- 1871 – The Paris Commune falls after two months.
- 1898 – Secondo Pia takes the first photographs of the Shroud of Turin and discovers that the image on the Shroud itself appears to be a photographic negative.

=== 1901–present ===
- 1905 – Russo-Japanese War: The Battle of Tsushima ends with the destruction of the Russian Baltic Fleet by Admiral Tōgō Heihachirō and the Imperial Japanese Navy.
- 1907 – The first Isle of Man TT race is held.
- 1918 – The Azerbaijan Democratic Republic and the First Republic of Armenia declare their independence.
- 1926 – The 28 May 1926 coup d'état: Ditadura Nacional is established in Portugal to suppress the unrest of the First Republic.
- 1932 – In the Netherlands, construction of the Afsluitdijk is completed and the Zuiderzee bay is converted to the freshwater IJsselmeer.
- 1934 – Near Callander, Ontario, Canada, the Dionne quintuplets are born to Oliva and Elzire Dionne; they will be the first quintuplets to survive infancy.
- 1936 – Alan Turing submits On Computable Numbers for publication.
- 1940 – World War II: Belgium surrenders to Nazi Germany to end the Battle of Belgium.
- 1940 – World War II: Norwegian, French, Polish and British forces recapture Narvik in Norway. This is the first Allied infantry victory of the War.
- 1948 – Daniel François Malan is elected as Prime Minister of South Africa. He later goes on to implement Apartheid.
- 1958 – Cuban Revolution: Fidel Castro's 26th of July Movement, heavily reinforced by Frank Pais Militia, overwhelm an army post in El Uvero.
- 1961 – Peter Benenson's article The Forgotten Prisoners is published in several internationally read newspapers. This will later be thought of as the founding of the human rights organization Amnesty International.
- 1962 – The Soviet Kosmos 5 satellite is launched.
- 1964 – The Palestine Liberation Organization (PLO) is founded, with Yasser Arafat elected as its first leader.
- 1968 – Garuda Indonesian Airways Flight 892 crashes near Nala Sopara in India, killing 30.
- 1974 – Northern Ireland's power-sharing Sunningdale Agreement collapses following a general strike by loyalists.
- 1975 – Fifteen West African countries sign the Treaty of Lagos, creating the Economic Community of West African States.
- 1975 – At Brampton Centennial Secondary School, student Michael Slobodian kills two people and injures 13 others before committing suicide.
- 1977 – The Beverly Hills Supper Club in Southgate, Kentucky, is engulfed by fire, killing 165 people inside.
- 1979 – Konstantinos Karamanlis signs the full treaty of the accession of Greece with the European Economic Community.
- 1987 – An 18-year-old West German pilot, Mathias Rust, evades Soviet Union air defences and lands a private plane in Red Square in Moscow, Russia.
- 1991 – The capital city of Addis Ababa falls to the Ethiopian People's Revolutionary Democratic Front, ending both the Derg regime in Ethiopia and the Ethiopian Civil War.
- 1995 – The 7.0 M_{w} Neftegorsk earthquake shakes the former Russian settlement of Neftegorsk with a maximum Mercalli intensity of IX (Violent). Total damage was $64.1–300 million, with 1,989 deaths and 750 injured. The settlement was not rebuilt.
- 1998 – Nuclear testing: Pakistan responds to a series of nuclear tests by India with five of its own codenamed Chagai-I, prompting the United States, Japan, and other nations to impose economic sanctions. Pakistan celebrates Youm-e-Takbir annually.
- 2003 – Peter Hollingworth resigns as Governor-General of Australia following criticism of his handling of child sexual abuse allegations during his tenure as Anglican Archbishop of Brisbane.
- 2004 – The Iraqi Governing Council chooses Ayad Allawi, a longtime anti-Saddam Hussein exile, as prime minister of Iraq's interim government.
- 2008 – The first meeting of the Constituent Assembly of Nepal formally declares Nepal a republic, ending the 240-year reign of the Shah dynasty.
- 2010 – In West Bengal, India, the Jnaneswari Express train derailment and subsequent collision kills 148 passengers.
- 2011 – Malta votes on the introduction of divorce; the proposal was approved by 53% of voters, resulting in a law allowing divorce under certain conditions being enacted later in the year.
- 2012 – The Arkankergen massacre in Kazakhstan's Alakol District kills 15 people.
- 2013 – Start of the Gezi Park protests in Turkey.
- 2016 – Harambe, a gorilla, is shot to death after grabbing a three-year-old boy in his enclosure at the Cincinnati Zoo and Botanical Garden, resulting in widespread criticism and sparking various internet memes.
- 2017 – Former Formula One driver Takuma Sato wins his first Indianapolis 500, the first Japanese and Asian driver to do so. Double world champion Fernando Alonso retires from the race with an engine issue in his first entry of the event.

== Births ==
=== Pre-1600 ===
- 1140 – Xin Qiji, Chinese poet, general, and politician (died 1207)
- 1371 – John the Fearless, Duke of Burgundy (died 1419)
- 1588 – Pierre Séguier, French politician, Lord Chancellor of France (died 1672)
- 1589 – Robert Arnauld d'Andilly, French writer (died 1674)

=== 1601–1900 ===
- 1663 – António Manoel de Vilhena, Grand Master of the Order of Saint John (died 1736)
- 1676 – Jacopo Riccati, Italian mathematician and academic (died 1754)
- 1692 – Geminiano Giacomelli, Italian composer (died 1740)
- 1738 – Joseph-Ignace Guillotin, French physician (died 1814)
- 1759 – William Pitt the Younger, English lawyer and politician, Prime Minister of the United Kingdom (died 1806)
- 1763 – Manuel Alberti, Argentinian priest and journalist (died 1811)
- 1764 – Edward Livingston, American jurist and politician, 11th United States Secretary of State (died 1836)
- 1779 – Thomas Moore, Irish poet and composer (died 1852)
- 1807 – Louis Agassiz, Swiss-American paleontologist and geologist (died 1873)
- 1818 – P. G. T. Beauregard, American general (died 1893)
- 1828 – Ratmalane Sri Dharmaloka Thera, Buddhist monk and scholar, founder of Vidyalankara Pirivena (died 1885)
- 1836 – Friedrich Baumfelder, German pianist, composer, and conductor (died 1916)
- 1836 – Alexander Mitscherlich, German chemist and academic (died 1918)
- 1837 – George Ashlin, Irish architect, co-designed St Colman's Cathedral (died 1921)
- 1837 – Tony Pastor, American impresario, variety performer and theatre owner (died 1908)
- 1841 – Sakaigawa Namiemon, Japanese sumo wrestler, the 14th Yokozuna (died 1887)
- 1853 – Carl Larsson, Swedish painter and author (died 1919)
- 1858 – Carl Richard Nyberg, Swedish inventor and businessman, developed the blow torch (died 1939)
- 1872 – Marian Smoluchowski, Polish physicist and mountaineer (died 1917)
- 1878 – Paul Pelliot, French sinologist and explorer (died 1945)
- 1879 – Milutin Milanković, Serbian mathematician, astronomer, and geophysicist (died 1958)
- 1883 – Vinayak Damodar Savarkar, Indian poet and politician (died 1966)
- 1883 – Clough Williams-Ellis, English-Welsh architect, designed the Portmeirion Village (died 1978)
- 1884 – Edvard Beneš, Czech academic and politician, 2nd and 4th President of Czechoslovakia (died 1948)
- 1886 – Santo Trafficante Sr., Italian-American mobster (died 1954)
- 1888 – Kaarel Eenpalu, Estonian journalist and politician, 6th Prime Minister of Estonia (died 1942)
- 1888 – Vivienne Haigh-Wood Eliot, English author and educator (died 1947)
- 1888 – Jim Thorpe, American decathlete, football player, and coach (died 1953)
- 1889 – Richard Réti, Slovak-Czech chess player and author (died 1929)
- 1892 – Minna Gombell, American actress (died 1973)
- 1900 – Tommy Ladnier, American trumpet player (died 1939)

=== 1901–present ===
- 1903 – S. L. Kirloskar, Indian businessman, founded Kirloskar Group (died 1994)
- 1906 – Henry Thambiah, Sri Lankan lawyer, judge, and diplomat, Sri Lankan High Commissioner to Canada (died 1997)
- 1908 – Léo Cadieux, Canadian journalist and politician, 17th Canadian Minister of National Defence (died 2005)
- 1908 – Ian Fleming, English journalist and author, created James Bond (died 1964)
- 1909 – Red Horner, Canadian ice hockey player (died 2005)
- 1910 – Georg Gaßmann, German politician, Mayor of Marburg (died 1987)
- 1910 – Rachel Kempson, English actress (died 2003)
- 1910 – T-Bone Walker, American singer-songwriter and guitarist (died 1975)
- 1911 – Bob Crisp, South African cricketer (died 1994)
- 1911 – Thora Hird, English actress (died 2003)
- 1911 – Fritz Hochwälder, Austrian playwright (died 1986)
- 1912 – Herman Johannes, Indonesian scientist, academic, and politician (died 1992)
- 1912 – Ruby Payne-Scott, Australian physicist and astronomer (died 1981)
- 1912 – Patrick White, Australian novelist, poet, and playwright, Nobel Prize laureate (died 1990)
- 1914 – W. G. G. Duncan Smith, English captain and pilot (died 1996)
- 1915 – Joseph Greenberg, American linguist and academic (died 2001)
- 1916 – Walker Percy, American novelist and essayist (died 1990)
- 1917 – Barry Commoner, American biologist, academic, and politician (died 2012)
- 1917 – Papa John Creach, American violinist (died 1994)
- 1918 – Johnny Wayne, Canadian comedian (died 1990)
- 1921 – D. V. Paluskar, Indian Hindustani classical musician (died 1955)
- 1921 – Heinz G. Konsalik, German journalist and author (died 1999)
- 1921 – Tom Uren, Australian soldier, boxer, and politician (died 2015)
- 1922 – Lou Duva, American boxer, trainer, and manager (died 2017)
- 1922 – Roger Fisher, American author and academic (died 2012)
- 1922 – Tuomas Gerdt, Finnish soldier (died 2020)
- 1923 – György Ligeti, Hungarian-Austrian composer and educator (died 2006)
- 1923 – N. T. Rama Rao, Indian actor, director, producer, and politician, 10th Chief Minister of Andhra Pradesh (died 1996)
- 1924 – Edward du Cann, English naval officer and politician (died 2017)
- 1924 – Paul Hébert, Canadian actor (died 2017)
- 1925 – Bülent Ecevit, Turkish journalist, scholar, and politician, 16th Prime Minister of Turkey (died 2006)
- 1925 – Dietrich Fischer-Dieskau, German opera singer and conductor (died 2012)
- 1928 – Sally Forrest, American actress and dancer (died 2015)
- 1929 – Patrick McNair-Wilson, English politician (died 2025)
- 1930 – Edward Seaga, American-Jamaican academic and politician, 5th Prime Minister of Jamaica (died 2019)
- 1931 – Carroll Baker, American actress
- 1931 – Gordon Willis, American cinematographer (died 2014)
- 1932 – Tim Renton, Baron Renton of Mount Harry, English politician, Minister for Culture, Communications and Creative Industries (died 2020)
- 1933 – John Karlen, American actor (died 2020)
- 1933 – Zelda Rubinstein, American actress and activist (died 2010)
- 1936 – Claude Forget, Canadian academic and politician
- 1936 – Ole K. Sara, Norwegian politician (died 2013)
- 1936 – Betty Shabazz, American educator and activist (died 1997)
- 1938 – Jerry West, American basketball player, coach, and executive (died 2024)
- 1939 – Maeve Binchy, Irish novelist (died 2012)
- 1940 – David Brewer, English politician, Lord-Lieutenant of Greater London (died 2023)
- 1940 – Shlomo Riskin, American rabbi and academic, founded the Lincoln Square Synagogue
- 1941 – Beth Howland, American actress and singer (died 2015)
- 1942 – Stanley B. Prusiner, American neurologist and biochemist, Nobel Prize laureate
- 1943 – Terry Crisp, Canadian ice hockey player and coach
- 1944 – Faith Brown, English actress and singer
- 1944 – Rudy Giuliani, American lawyer and politician, 107th mayor of New York City
- 1944 – Gladys Knight, American singer-songwriter and actress
- 1944 – Sondra Locke, American actress and director (died 2018)
- 1944 – Rita MacNeil, Canadian singer and actress (died 2013)
- 1944 – Patricia Quinn, British actress and singer
- 1944 – Gary Stewart, American singer-songwriter (died 2003)
- 1944 – Billy Vera, American singer-songwriter and actor
- 1945 – Patch Adams, American physician and author, founded the Gesundheit! Institute
- 1945 – John N. Bambacus, American military veteran (USMC) and politician
- 1945 – John Fogerty, American singer-songwriter, guitarist, and producer
- 1945 – Jean Perrault, Canadian politician, Mayor of Sherbrooke, Quebec
- 1945 – Helena Shovelton, English physician
- 1946 – Bruce Alexander, English actor
- 1946 – Skip Jutze, American baseball player
- 1946 – Janet Paraskeva, Welsh politician
- 1946 – K. Satchidanandan, Indian poet and critic
- 1946 – William Shawcross, English journalist and author
- 1947 – Zahi Hawass, Egyptian archaeologist and academic
- 1947 – Lynn Johnston, Canadian author and illustrator
- 1947 – Leland Sklar, American singer-songwriter and bass player
- 1948 – Michael Field, Australian politician, 38th Premier of Tasmania
- 1948 – Pierre Rapsat, Belgian singer and songwriter (died 2002)
- 1949 – Martin Kelner, English journalist, author, comedian, singer, actor and radio presenter
- 1949 – Wendy O. Williams, American singer-songwriter, musician, and actress (died 1998)
- 1950 – Errol Thompson, Canadian ice hockey player
- 1952 – Roger Briggs, American pianist, composer, conductor, and educator
- 1953 – Pierre Gauthier, Canadian ice hockey player and manager
- 1954 – João Carlos de Oliveira, Brazilian jumper (died 1999)
- 1954 – Péter Szilágyi, Hungarian conductor and politician (died 2013)
- 1955 – Mark Howe, Canadian-American ice hockey player
- 1956 – Jerry Douglas, American guitarist and producer
- 1957 – Kirk Gibson, American baseball player and manager
- 1959 – Risto Mannisenmäki, Finnish racing driver
- 1960 – Mark Sanford, American military veteran (USAF) and politician, 115th Governor of South Carolina
- 1962 – Randy Pedersen, American bowler and sportscaster (died 2026)
- 1963 – Houman Younessi, Australian-American biologist and academic (died 2016)
- 1964 – Jeff Fenech, Australian boxer and trainer
- 1964 – Armen Gilliam, American basketball player and coach (died 2011)
- 1964 – Duane Ward, American baseball player (died 2026)
- 1965 – Chris Ballew, American singer-songwriter and bass player
- 1965 – Mary Coughlan, Irish politician
- 1967 – Glen Rice, American basketball player
- 1968 – Kylie Minogue, Australian singer-songwriter, producer, and actress
- 1969 – Mike DiFelice, American baseball player and manager
- 1969 – Rob Ford, Canadian politician, 64th Mayor of Toronto (died 2016)
- 1969 – Justin Kirk, American actor
- 1970 – Glenn Quinn, Irish actor (died 2002)
- 1971 – Isabelle Carré, French actress and singer
- 1971 – Ekaterina Gordeeva, Russian figure skater and sportscaster
- 1971 – Marco Rubio, American lawyer and politician
- 1972 – Doriva, Brazilian footballer and manager
- 1972 – Michael Boogerd, Dutch cyclist and manager
- 1973 – Marco Paulo Faria Lemos, Portuguese footballer and manager
- 1974 – Hans-Jörg Butt, German footballer
- 1974 – Misbah-ul-Haq, Pakistani cricketer
- 1975 – Maura Johnston, American journalist, critic, and academic
- 1976 – Steven Bell, Australian rugby league player
- 1976 – Zaza Enden, Georgian-Turkish wrestler, basketball player, and coach
- 1976 – Roberto Goretti, Italian footballer
- 1976 – Glenn Morrison, Australian rugby league player and coach
- 1976 – Liam O'Brien, American voice actor
- 1977 – Elisabeth Hasselbeck, American talk show host and author
- 1978 – Jake Johnson, American actor
- 1979 – Abdulaziz al-Omari, Saudi Arabian terrorist, hijacker of American Airlines Flight 11 (died 2001)
- 1979 – Ronald Curry, American football player and coach
- 1980 – Miguel Pérez, Spanish footballer
- 1980 – Lucy Shuker, English tennis player
- 1981 – Laura Bailey, American voice actress
- 1981 – Daniel Cabrera, Dominican-American baseball player
- 1981 – Eric Ghiaciuc, American football player
- 1981 – Adam Green, American singer-songwriter and guitarist
- 1982 – Alexa Davalos, French-American actress
- 1982 – Jhonny Peralta, Dominican-American baseball player
- 1983 – Steve Cronin, American soccer player
- 1983 – Humberto Sánchez, Dominican-American baseball player
- 1983 – Roman Atwood, American YouTuber
- 1983 – Krista Kosonen, Finnish actress
- 1985 – Colbie Caillat, American singer-songwriter and guitarist
- 1985 – Pablo Andrés González, Argentinian footballer
- 1985 – Kostas Mendrinos, Greek footballer
- 1985 – Carey Mulligan, English actress
- 1986 – Berrick Barnes, Australian rugby player
- 1986 – Bryant Dunston, American-Armenian basketball player
- 1986 – Michael Oher, American football player
- 1986 – Seth Rollins, American wrestler
- 1986 – Ingmar Vos, Dutch decathlete
- 1987 – T.J. Yates, American football player
- 1988 – NaVorro Bowman, American football player
- 1988 – Percy Harvin, American football player
- 1988 – Craig Kimbrel, American baseball player
- 1988 – David Perron, Canadian ice hockey player
- 1990 – Kyle Walker, English footballer
- 1990 – Riquna Williams, American basketball player
- 1991 – Danielle Lao, American tennis player
- 1993 – Daniel Alvaro, Australian rugby league player
- 1993 – Bárbara Luz, Portuguese tennis player
- 1994 – Alec Benjamin, American singer and songwriter
- 1994 – John Stones, English footballer
- 1995 – Lukas Gage, American actor
- 1998 – Kim Dahyun, South Korean rapper and singer
- 1998 – De'Anthony Melton, American basketball player
- 1999 – Cameron Boyce, American actor (died 2019)
- 1999 – Jodie Burrage, British tennis player
- 2000 – Phil Foden, English footballer
- 2000 – Risi Pouri-Lane, New Zealand rugby sevens player

== Deaths ==
=== Pre-1600 ===
- 576 – Germain of Paris, French bishop and saint (born 496)
- 741 – Ucha'an K'in B'alam, Mayan king
- 926 – Kong Qian, official of Later Tang
- 926 – Li Jiji, prince of Later Tang
- 1023 – Wulfstan, English archbishop
- 1279 – William Wishart, Scottish bishop
- 1327 – Robert Baldock, Lord Privy Seal and Lord Chancellor of England
- 1357 – Afonso IV of Portugal (born 1291)
- 1427 – Henry IV, Count of Holstein-Rendsburg (born 1397)
- 1556 – Saitō Dōsan, Japanese samurai (born 1494)

=== 1601–1900 ===
- 1626 – Thomas Howard, 1st Earl of Suffolk (born 1561)
- 1651 – Henry Grey, 10th Earl of Kent, English politician (born 1594)
- 1672 – John Trevor, Welsh politician, Secretary of State for the Northern Department (born 1626)
- 1727 – Juan de Ayala y Escobar, Governor of Spanish Florida (1716–1718) (born 1635)
- 1747 – Luc de Clapiers, marquis de Vauvenargues, French author (born 1715)
- 1750 – Emperor Sakuramachi of Japan (born 1720)
- 1787 – Leopold Mozart, Austrian violinist, composer, and conductor (born 1719)
- 1805 – Luigi Boccherini, Italian cellist and composer (born 1743)
- 1811 – Henry Dundas, 1st Viscount Melville, Scottish lawyer and politician, Secretary of State for War (born 1742)
- 1831 – William Carnegie, 7th Earl of Northesk, Scottish-English admiral (born 1756)
- 1843 – Noah Webster, American lexicographer (born 1758)
- 1849 – Anne Brontë, English novelist and poet (born 1820)
- 1864 – Simion Bărnuțiu, Romanian historian and politician (born 1808)
- 1878 – John Russell, 1st Earl Russell, English politician, Prime Minister of the United Kingdom (born 1792)

=== 1901–present ===
- 1904 – Kicking Bear, Native American tribal leader (born 1846)
- 1916 – Ivan Franko, Ukrainian economist, journalist, and poet (born 1856)
- 1927 – Boris Kustodiev, Russian painter and stage designer (born 1878)
- 1930 – Frank Cowper, English yachtsman, author and illustrator (born 1849)
- 1937 – Alfred Adler, Austrian-Scottish ophthalmologist and psychologist (born 1870)
- 1946 – Carter Glass, American publisher and politician, 47th United States Secretary of the Treasury (born 1858)
- 1947 – August Eigruber, Austrian-German politician (born 1907)
- 1952 – Philippe Desranleau, Canadian archbishop (born 1882)
- 1953 – Tatsuo Hori, Japanese author and poet (born 1904)
- 1964 – Terry Dillon, American football player (born 1941)
- 1968 – Fyodor Okhlopkov, Russian sergeant and sniper (born 1908)
- 1971 – Audie Murphy, American soldier and actor, Medal of Honor recipient (born 1925)
- 1972 – Edward VIII of the United Kingdom (born 1894)
- 1975 – Ezzard Charles, American boxer (born 1921)
- 1976 – Zainul Abedin, Bangladeshi painter and sculptor (born 1914)
- 1980 – Rolf Nevanlinna, Finnish mathematician and academic (born 1895)
- 1981 – Mary Lou Williams, American pianist and composer (born 1910)
- 1981 – Stefan Wyszyński, Polish cardinal (born 1901)
- 1982 – H. Jones, English colonel, Victoria Cross recipient (born 1940)
- 1983 – Erastus Corning 2nd, American soldier and politician, 72nd Mayor of Albany (born 1909)
- 1984 – Eric Morecambe, English actor and comedian (born 1926)
- 1984 – D'Urville Martin, American actor and director (born 1939)
- 1986 – Edip Cansever, Turkish poet and author (born 1928)
- 1988 – Sy Oliver, American trumpet player, composer, and bandleader (born 1910)
- 1990 – Julius Eastman, American composer (born 1940)
- 1994 – Julius Boros, American golfer (born 1920)
- 1994 – Ely Jacques Kahn, Jr., American author and academic (born 1916)
- 1998 – Phil Hartman, Canadian-American actor and comedian (born 1948)
- 1999 – Michael Barkai, Israeli commander (born 1935)
- 1999 – B. Vittalacharya, Indian director and producer (born 1920)
- 2000 – George Irving Bell, American physicist, biologist, and mountaineer (born 1926)
- 2001 – Joe Moakley, American lawyer and politician (born 1927)
- 2001 – Francisco Varela, Chilean biologist and philosopher (born 1946)
- 2002 – Ebrahim Al-Arrayedh, Indian poet and author (born 1908)
- 2002 – Mildred Benson, American journalist and author (born 1905)
- 2003 – Oleg Grigoryevich Makarov, Russian engineer and astronaut (born 1933)
- 2003 – Ilya Prigogine, Russian-Belgian chemist and academic, Nobel Prize laureate (born 1917)
- 2003 – Martha Scott, American actress (born 1912)
- 2004 – Michael Buonauro, American author and illustrator (born 1979)
- 2004 – John Tolos, Greek-Canadian wrestler (born 1930)
- 2006 – Thorleif Schjelderup, Norwegian ski jumper and author (born 1920)
- 2007 – Jörg Immendorff, German painter, sculptor, and academic (born 1945)
- 2007 – Toshikatsu Matsuoka, Japanese politician, Japanese Minister of Agriculture (born 1945)
- 2008 – Beryl Cook, English painter and illustrator (born 1926)
- 2010 – Gary Coleman, American actor (born 1968)
- 2011 – Gino Valenzano, Italian racing driver (born 1920)
- 2012 – Bob Edwards, English journalist (born 1925)
- 2012 – Yuri Susloparov, Ukrainian-Russian footballer and manager (born 1958)
- 2013 – Viktor Kulikov, Russian commander (born 1921)
- 2013 – Eddie Romero, Filipino director, producer, screenwriter, and National Artist for Cinema and Broadcast Arts (born 1924)
- 2013 – Gerd Schmückle, German general (born 1917)
- 2014 – Maya Angelou, American memoirist and poet (born 1928)
- 2014 – Stan Crowther, English footballer (born 1935)
- 2014 – Oscar Dystel, American publisher (born 1912)
- 2014 – Malcolm Glazer, American businessman (born 1928)
- 2014 – Bob Houbregs, Canadian-American basketball player and manager (born 1932)
- 2014 – Isaac Kungwane, South African footballer (born 1971)
- 2015 – Steven Gerber, American pianist and composer (born 1948)
- 2015 – Johnny Keating, Scottish trombonist, composer, and producer (born 1927)
- 2015 – Reynaldo Rey, American actor and screenwriter (born 1940)
- 2016 – Harambe, Cincinnati Zoo western lowland gorilla (born 1999)
- 2018 – Neale Cooper, Scottish footballer (born 1963)
- 2018 – Jens Christian Skou, Danish medical doctor and Nobel Prize laureate (born 1918)
- 2018 – Cornelia Frances, English-Australian actress (born 1941)
- 2021 – Mark Eaton, American basketball player (born 1957)
- 2022 – Patricia Brake, English actress (born 1942)
- 2023 – David Breaer, English politician, Lord-Lieutenant of Greater London (born 1940)
- 2023 – George Cassidy, Northern Irish jazz musician and music teacher (born 1936)
- 2025 - Ngũgĩ wa Thiong'o, Kenyan writer and academic (born 1938)
- 2026 – Claude Lemieux, heavy-hitting retired NHL forward and four-time Stanley Cup winner (born 1965)

== Holidays and observances ==
- Armed Forces Day (Croatia)
- Christian feast day:
  - Bernard of Menthon
  - Germain of Paris
  - John Calvin (Episcopal Church)
  - Blessed Lanfranc
  - Blessed Margaret Pole
  - Blessed Maria Bagnesi
  - Blessed Thomas Ford
  - Ubaldesca Taccini
  - William of Gellone
  - May 28 (Eastern Orthodox liturgics)
- Downfall of the Derg (Ethiopia)
- Flag Day (Philippines)
- Menstrual Hygiene Day
- Republic Day (Nepal)
- TDFR Republic Day, celebrates the declaration of independence of the First Republic of Armenia and the Azerbaijan Democratic Republic from the Transcaucasian Democratic Federative Republic in 1918. (Azerbaijan and Armenia)
- Youm-e-Takbir (Pakistan)
