= Stadion an der Gisselberger Straße =

Football stadium in Marburg, Germany

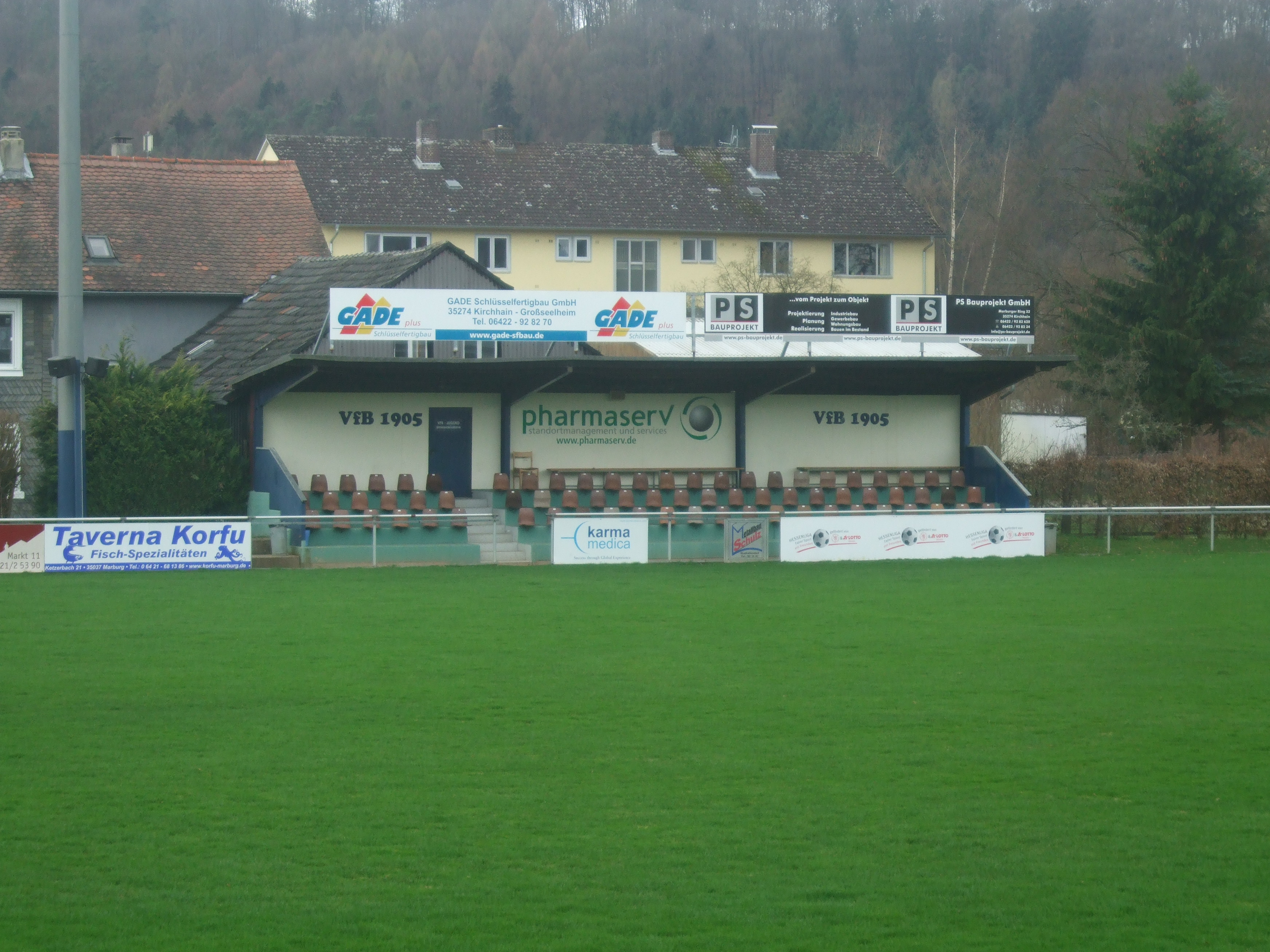
- Interactive map of Stadion an der Gisselberger Straße
- Full name: Stadion an der Gisselberger Straße
- Location: Ockershausen, Marburg
- Coordinates: 50°47′45.36″N 8°45′30.79″E
- Capacity: 4,000
- Surface: Grass
- Field size: 102 x 69 m

Construction
- Built: 1923

Tenant
- VfB Marburg

The Stadion an der Gisselberger Straße is a football stadium in the district of Ockershausen in Marburg, Germany.

VfB Marburg play most of their home league games here at the Gisselberger Straße stadium. The only exceptions being some cup games and friendlies against higher division clubs at the adjacent 12,000 capacity Georg-Gaßmann-Stadion.
