= 1242 =

1242 in various calendars
- Gregorian calendar: 1242; MCCXLII
- Ab urbe condita: 1995
- Armenian calendar: 691; ԹՎ ՈՂԱ
- Assyrian calendar: 5992
- Balinese saka calendar: 1163–1164
- Bengali calendar: 648–649
- Berber calendar: 2192
- English Regnal year: 26 Hen. 3 – 27 Hen. 3
- Buddhist calendar: 1786
- Burmese calendar: 604
- Byzantine calendar: 6750–6751
- Chinese calendar: 辛丑年 (Metal Ox); 3939 or 3732 — to — 壬寅年 (Water Tiger); 3940 or 3733
- Coptic calendar: 958–959
- Discordian calendar: 2408
- Ethiopian calendar: 1234–1235
- Hebrew calendar: 5002–5003
- Hindu calendars
- Vikram Samvat: 1298–1299
- Shaka Samvat: 1163–1164
- Kali Yuga: 4342–4343
- Holocene calendar: 11242
- Igbo calendar: 242–243
- Iranian calendar: 620–621
- Islamic calendar: 639–640
- Japanese calendar: Ninji 3 (仁治３年)
- Javanese calendar: 1151–1152
- Julian calendar: 1242; MCCXLII
- Korean calendar: 3575
- Minguo calendar: 670 before ROC 民前670年
- Nanakshahi calendar: −226
- Thai solar calendar: 1784–1785
- Tibetan calendar: ལྕགས་མོ་གླང་ལོ་ (female Iron-Ox); 1368 or 987 or 215 — to — ཆུ་ཕོ་སྟག་ལོ་ (male Water-Tiger); 1369 or 988 or 216

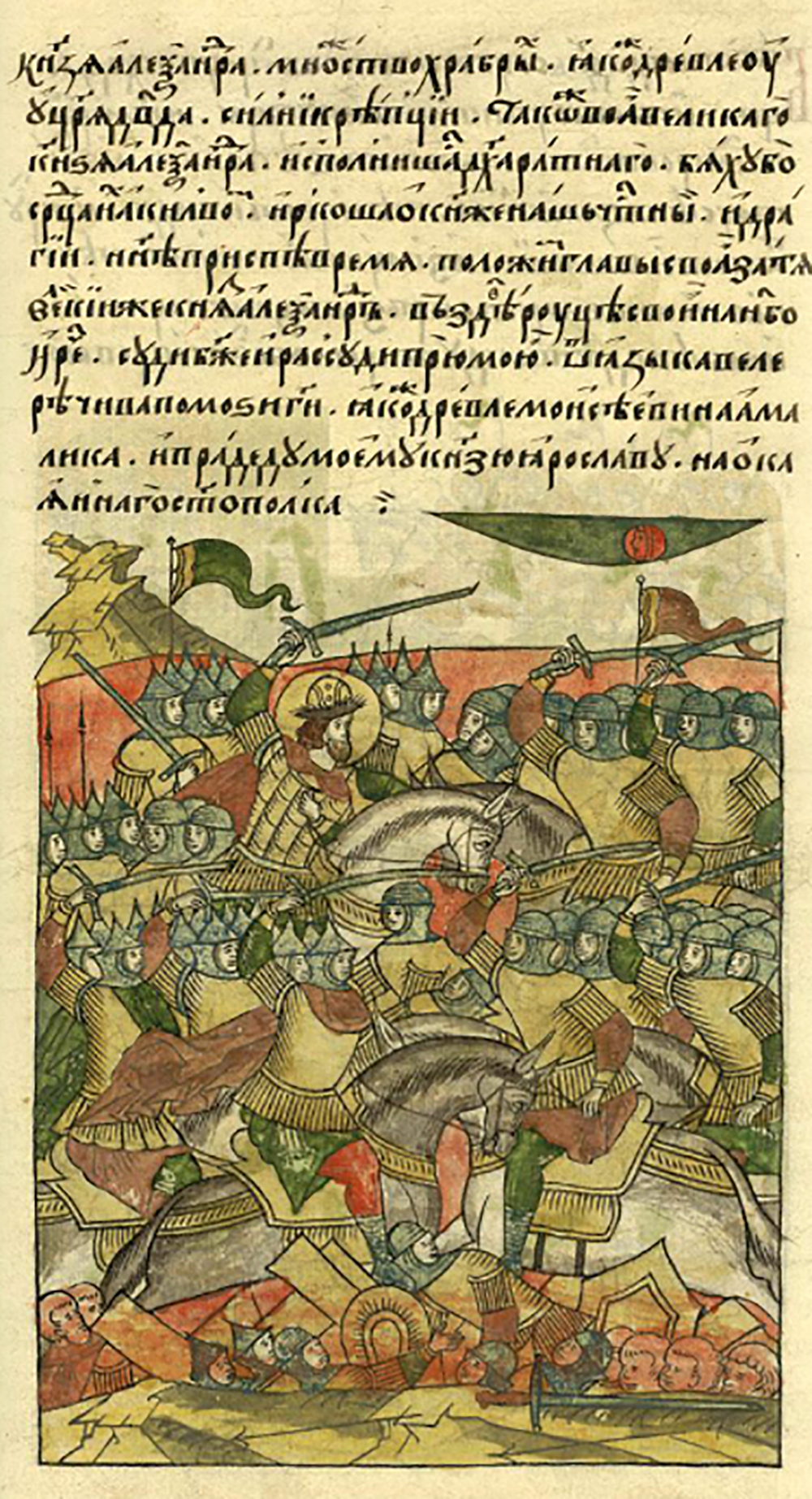
Depiction of the Battle of Lake Peipus in the late 16th century illuminated manuscript Life of Alexander Nevsky

Year 1242 (MCCXLII) was a common year starting on Wednesday of the Julian calendar.

== Events ==
=== By place ===
==== Europe ====
- Spring – Prince Alexander Nevsky is joined by his brother Andrey II (Yaroslavich) at Novgorod, supported with his elite druzhina (or 'household') from Suzdal. They head southwest across the frozen marshes, which cover much of the land between Novgorod and Pskov. On March 5, Alexander retakes the city almost without a struggle, before the larger Crusader garrison in nearby Izborsk can intervene.
- April – A Russian force led by Alexander Nevsky crosses the frontier between Novgorod and Livonian Crusader territory, to raid into Catholic Estonia. After that, Alexander breaks his army off into contingents to ravage the countryside. He is forced to turn back, when a local Crusader force under Bishop Hermann von Buxhövden defeats Alexander's advance guard at Mooste bridge south of Tartu.
- April 5 – Battle of Lake Peipus (or Battle on the Ice): Russian forces led by Alexander Nevsky, rebuff an invasion attempt by a Crusader army (some 2,600 men), including German Teutonic Knights. The opposing armies meet upon the frozen surface of Lake Peipus. The outnumbered Teutonic Knights are defeated on the slippery surface, by Alexander's elite druzhina and the Novgorod forces.
- May 28 – Avignonet massacre: A group of Cathars, with the probable connivance of Count Raymond VII of Toulouse, murder the inquisitor William Arnaud and eleven of his companions.
- July 21–22 – Battle of Taillebourg: French forces (some 25,000 men) under King Louis IX (the Saint) defeat King Henry III at the bridge over the Charente River near Taillebourg. After the battle, Louis continues to pursue the English troops, capturing many prisoners. Henry retreats with the remnants of his army to Bordeaux, where he spends the winter.
- Summer – Alexander Nevsky sends envoys to Batu Khan, preemptively capitulating before the Mongols even though they have not reached Novgorod, and accepts his rule as Mongol overlord.
- November 16 – King Béla IV issues the Golden Bull to the inhabitants of Gradec (modern-day Zagreb) and Samobor in Croatia. By this golden bull, Béla proclaimes Gradec a royal free city.
- Siegfried III, archbishop of Mainz, conquers Wiesbaden (a free imperial city) and orders the city's destruction, during the war of Emperor Frederick II against the Papal States.
- King Sancho II (the Pious) conquers the cities of Tavira, Alvor and Paderne, in his continuing expansion against the Muslims, known as the Reconquista.

==== Mongol Empire ====
- Spring – Siege of Esztergom: The Mongols under Batu Khan assault and destroy most of the Hungarian city of Esztergom. Batu Khan sends a reconnaissance party against the Holy Roman Empire.
- Battle of Grobnik Field: Croatian forces under Béla IV stop the Mongol invasion in Hungary and Croatia. Béla rebuilds the country and orders the building of fortifications through his kingdom.
- Batu Khan establishes the Golden Horde at Sarai and withdraws his forces after messengers arrive with the news that the Great Khan Ögedei Khan has died (see 1241).

==== England ====
- May – Isabella of Angoulême, mother of Henry III, persuades him to mount an expedition to retake Poitou. On May 20, Henry arrives at Royan and joins the rebelling French nobles – forming an army (some 30,000 men). Louis IX exchanges letters with Henry to resolve the conflict, but the dispute escalates further.

==== Africa ====
- Summer – In the Maghreb, after a string of successes against the Almohad Caliphate, Hafsid forces under Sultan Abu Zakariya Yahya conquer the city of Tlemcen (modern Algeria). The Kingdom of Tlemcen becomes a vassal of Abu Zakariya, and is formed in a series of small states between his rule and the states of the Western Maghreb.

==== Middle East ====
- Spring – The Templar Knights raid the city of Hebron. Meanwhile, An-Nasir Dawud, Ayyubid ruler of Damascus, sends forces to cut off the road to Jerusalem, and to levy tolls on the pilgrims and merchants that pass by.

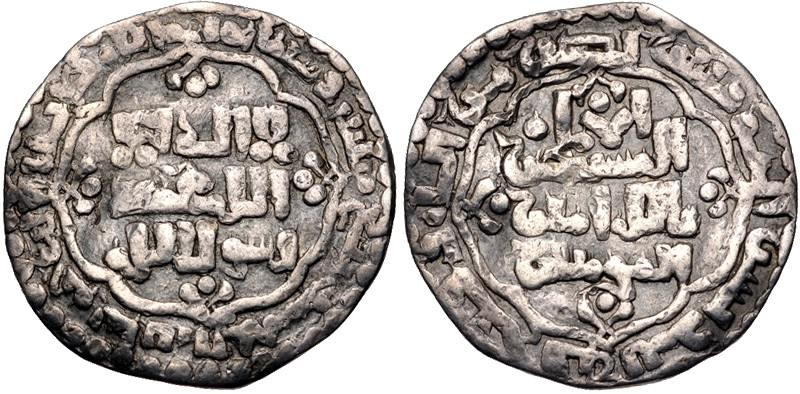
Dirham of al-Mustansir, Abbasid caliph

- Death of Abbasid caliph al-Mustansir and succession of al-Musta'sim to the Caliphal throne.

==== Asia ====
- February 10 – The 10-year-old Emperor Shijō of Japan dies suddenly; despite a dispute over who should follow him as sovereign, Go-Saga (son of former Emperor Tsuchimikado) ascends to the throne.

=== By topic ===
==== Religion ====
- William of Modena, Italian bishop and papal diplomat, sets up four dioceses in Poland, including the Archdiocese of Warmia.

==== Science ====
- Ibn al-Nafis, Arab polymath and writer, suggests that the right and left ventricles of the heart are separate, and describes the lesser circulation of blood.

== Births ==
- January 27 – Margaret of Hungary, Hungarian nun (d. 1270)
- March 17 – Maud de Prendergast, Irish noblewoman (d. 1272)
- June 25 – Beatrice of England, English princess (d. 1275)
- July 24 – Christina von Stommeln, German mystic (d. 1312)
- December 15 – Munetaka, Japanese shogun (d. 1274)
- Al-Ashraf Umar II, Arab ruler and astronomer (d. 1296)
- Beatrice of Castile, queen consort of Portugal (d. 1303)
- Beatrice of Navarre, duchess of Burgundy (d. 1295)
- George Pachymeres, Byzantine historian (d. 1310)
- Hōjō Tokimura, Japanese nobleman (rensho) (d. 1305)
- Patrick IV (de Dunbar), Scottish nobleman (d. 1308)
- Stephen I Kotromanić, Bosnian nobleman (d. 1314)
- Theobald Butler, Norman chief governor of Ireland (d. 1285)
- Theodoric of Landsberg, German nobleman (d. 1285)
- William I, German nobleman and archbishop (d. 1308)
- William de Leybourne, English nobleman (d. 1310)

== Deaths ==
- February 10
  - Shijō (or Mitsuhito), emperor of Japan (b. 1231)
  - Verdiana, Italian noblewoman and saint (b. 1182)
- February 12 – Henry VII, king of Germany (b. 1211)
- March 26 – William de Forz, English nobleman (b. 1190)
- March 28 – Theoderich von Wied, German archbishop
- April 22 – Abubakar ibn Gussom, Arab poet (b. 1168)
- May 13 – Gerard of Villamagna, Italian hermit (b. 1174)
- May 15 – Muiz ud din Bahram, Indian ruler (b. 1212)
- June 26 – Thomas de Beaumont, English nobleman
- July 1 – Chagatai Khan, son of Genghis Khan (b. 1183)
- July 14 – Hōjō Yasutoki, Japanese regent (b. 1183)
- October 7 – Juntoku, emperor of Japan (b. 1197)
- November 12 – Jocelin of Wells, English bishop
- November 20 – Narchat, Moksha queen (b. 1216)
- December 2 – Al-Mustansir, Abbasid caliph (b. 1192)
- December 9 – Richard le Gras, English abbot and bishop
- December 26 – Hugh de Lacy, 1st Earl of Ulster, Norman nobleman (b. 1176)
- Aimeric de Belenoi, French cleric, troubadour and writer
- Archambaud VIII of Bourbon ("the Great"), French nobleman (b. 1189)
- Ceslaus, Polish nobleman, jurist and missionary (b. 1184)
- Da'ud Abu al-Fadl, Ayyubid Jewish physician (b. 1161)
- Enguerrand III, Lord of Coucy, French nobleman and knight (b. 1182)
- Muhammad Aufi, Persian historian and writer (b. 1171)
- Nuño Sánchez, Spanish nobleman and knight (b. 1185)
- Ogasawara Nagakiyo, Japanese samurai (b. 1162)
- Richard de Morins, English archdeacon and jurist
- Richard Mór de Burgh, 1st Baron of Connaught, Norman nobleman (b. 1194)
- Sasaki Yoshikiyo, Japanese nobleman (b. 1161)
