= Dietrich Möller =

German politician (1937–2024)

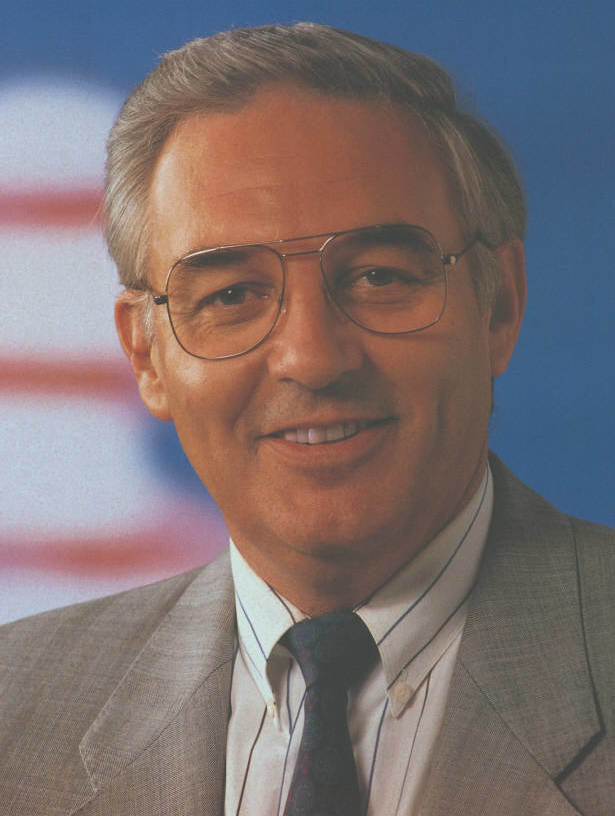
- Möller in 1991

Mayor of Marburg
- In office 1 January 1993 – 30 June 2005
- Preceded by: Hanno Drechsler
- Succeeded by: Egon Vaupel

Personal details
- Born: 3 November 1937 Dortmund, Germany
- Died: 28 December 2024 (aged 87) Weimar (Lahn), Hesse, Germany
- Party: CDU

Dietrich Möller (3 November 1937 – 28 December 2024) was a German politician, member of the Landtag of Hesse (CDU) and former mayor of Marburg.

Möller was the chairman of VfB Marburg from 2005 until 2013.

When he retired, he was made an honorary citizen for his services to the city. On 14 August 2006, Möller received the Federal Cross of Merit, First Class.

Political offices
Preceded by Hanno Drechsler	Mayor of Marburg; 1 January 1993 – 30 June 2005	Succeeded by Egon Vaupel
