= Hanno Drechsler =

German politician (1931–2003)

Mayor of Marburg
- In office 11 September 1970 – 31 December 1992
- Preceded by: Georg Gaßmann
- Succeeded by: Dietrich Möller

Personal details
- Born: 24 March 1931 Schönheide, Saxony
- Died: 4 January 2003 (aged 71) Marburg, Hesse
- Party: SPD
- Spouse: Gisela Drechsler
- Children: Wolfgang Drechsler
- Education: University of Marburg
- Profession: Teacher

Hanno Drechsler (24 March 1931 – 4 January 2003) was the Lord Mayor of the City of Marburg, Germany between 1970 and 1992, and the instigator of its restoration after urban renewal; he was also an important Social Democratic politician and political scientist.

== Life ==
=== Education ===
Hanno Drechsler went to school in Saxony, where after High School he studied to become a teacher and was certified for doing so on all levels, becoming very early the Principal of the Oberschule in Falkenstein. Because of political conflicts with the SED regime (such as the toleration of students who were members of a church), he and his wife fled East Germany in 1955, and settled in Marburg, West Germany. Here, Drechsler studied again, at the University of Marburg (1955–1961), mostly Political Science, History, and the German language, and became a student and then assistant of the political scientist Wolfgang Abendroth who was the main representative of political science of the "Frankfurt School". In 1962, he received his PhD with a thesis on the Sozialistische Arbeiterpartei Deutschlands (SAP), and became an expert on the small parties "between" social democrats and communists during the Weimar Republic.

=== Career ===
Afterwards, he became "(Ober-)Studienratim Hochschuldienst" (lecturer and senior lecturer or assistant professor, but with tenure) at the University of Giessen's Political Science Department. He remained active in Marburg municipal and Hesse politics as a social democrat, where he soon held positions in the City Parliament. In 1970, he was elected – after declining to become the president of the newly founded University of Kassel – Lord Mayor of the City of Marburg, a position he held until his retirement for health reasons in 1992, drawing in the end popular support of well over 75% of the citizens.

=== Achievements ===
He provided tenacious and strong support and implementation of the restoration of the Oberstadt (uptown) of Marburg, one of the most important old German cities largely untouched by the war, full with timbered and stone houses of Gothic and Renaissance times and with famous castle, churches, including the earliest Gothic church in Germany dedicated to St. Elisabeth of Hungary. In the beginning, this was a battle against the zeitgeist, as the idea in the early 1970s was still to raze the old houses to the ground, make the town centre accessible to traffic, etc. To restore all houses individually, create pedestrian zones, but to make the Oberstadt livable and not just a tourist attraction was largely his idea, and he implemented it against then strong opposition.

He significantly promoted art and culture as well, using his contacts and charisma to assist artists and musicians in Marburg. Much in the international success of Rose Nabinger and the jazz band "Kreisjazzwerkerschaft" probably came from their appearances he made possible in the sister cities all over Europe.

=== Party functions ===
Since 1956, Drechsler was a member of the SPD and held numerous party function, also on the state and federal level. He was for decades the chairman of the local government SPD council in Hesse and on the board of the Deutscher Städtetag, the German Council of Independent Cities. He was a strong promoter, also in scholarly work and writings, of municipal autonomy, as well as of German Reunification. Offers of other positions, such as SPD candidate (with a great likelihood to win) for Lord Mayor of Frankfurt am Main, or as Minister of the Interior of Hesse, he always declined.

=== Honours ===
Among the many honours Drechsler received are the Bundesverdienstkreuz (Federal Merit Cross) 1st Class, the Merit Cross of the State of Hesse, the Silver Merit Cross of the Red Cross Germany, and the Freiherr vom Stein-Plaque, the highest German award for merits in the area of local governance and municipal autonomy. He was also an honorary citizen of Poitiers, France, a sister city of Marburg, and of Marburg itself. One of the issues closest to him – a Methodist – which he promoted very strongly was the dialogue and re-invitation of the Jewish former citizens of Marburg, the reopening of a synagogue and the reemergence of a Jewish community in Marburg; the recognitions and awards he received for that were those especially important to him. In fact, it was a stroke (after some earlier heart attacks) that he suffered after, against his doctors' advice, speaking in an outside ceremony to memorialize the "Reichskristallnacht" at the place of the former synagogue in 1991 that ended his career.

=== Family ===
Hanno Drechsler was married, for 53 years, to Gisela Drechsler née Streller (2 March 1931 – 19 October 2008); their son is the social scientist Wolfgang Drechsler.

=== Memorials ===
Today, Hanno Drechsler is remembered by the "Hanno-Drechsler-Platz", an urban space that forms the south-westerly gate to the Oberstadt for pedestrians, with a fountain and trees, but mostly by the intact and restored Oberstadt itself.

== Published works ==
- Drechsler, Hanno et al., eds, Gesellschaft und Staat: Lexikon der Politik, 10th edn., Munich: Vahlen, 2003 (1st edn. Baden-Baden: Signal, 1970; recipient of the Deutscher Jugendbuchpreis)
- Drechsler, Hanno et al., Zur Geschichte der Synagoge und der jüdischen Gemeinde in Marburg, 2nd edn., Marburg: Stadt Marburg, 1993 (Marburger Stadtschriften zur Geschichte und Kultur, 39)
- Drechsler, Hanno et al., Rabbiner Dr. Leopold Lucas: Marburg 1872–1943 Theresienstadt: Versuch einer Würdigung, Marburg: Stadt Marburg, 1987 (Marburger Stadtschriften zur Geschichte und Kultur, 21)
- Drechsler, Hanno, Die Sozialistische Arbeiterpartei Deutschlands (SAPD): Ein Beitrag zur Geschichte der Deutschen Arbeiterbewegung am Ende der Weimarer Republik, Meisenheim am Glan: Hain, 1963; Repr. Hannover: Politladen, 1971; 2. Repr. Hamburg: Junius, 1999

Political offices
Preceded by Georg Gaßmann	Mayor of Marburg; 11 September 1970 – 31 December 1992	Succeeded by Dietrich Möller
