= 3rd Moroccan Tirailleurs Regiment =

- 3^{ème} Régiment de Tirailleurs Marocains
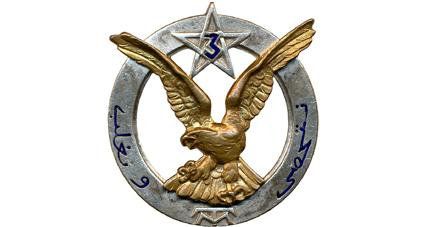
- Regimental badge of the 3rd Moroccan Tirailleurs Regiment
- Disbanded: 1955
- Country: French protectorate in Morocco
- Allegiance: French Third Republic / French protectorate in Morocco / Free French French protectorate in Morocco / Provisional Government of the French Republic / French Fourth Republic
- Branch: French Army
- Type: Tirailleurs
- Role: Light Infantry; Security assistance
- Battle honours: Morocco 1922-34; Indochine 1948-1954

3rd Moroccan Tirailleurs Regiment (3^{ème} Régiment de Tirailleurs Marocains) was an infantry regiment belonging to the Army of Africa which was part of the French Army following the First World War.

The term "Tirailleur" emerged in the Napoleonic era to refer to a type of light infantry whose role was to skirmish ahead of the main columns. It was later used by the French Army to refer to infantry recruited in the French colonial territories during the 19th and 20th centuries.

The regiment was founded on 1 January 1920 with the 5th, 7th and 12th Bataillons, under the command lieutenant-colonel Féral.

== Creation and dissolution over time ==
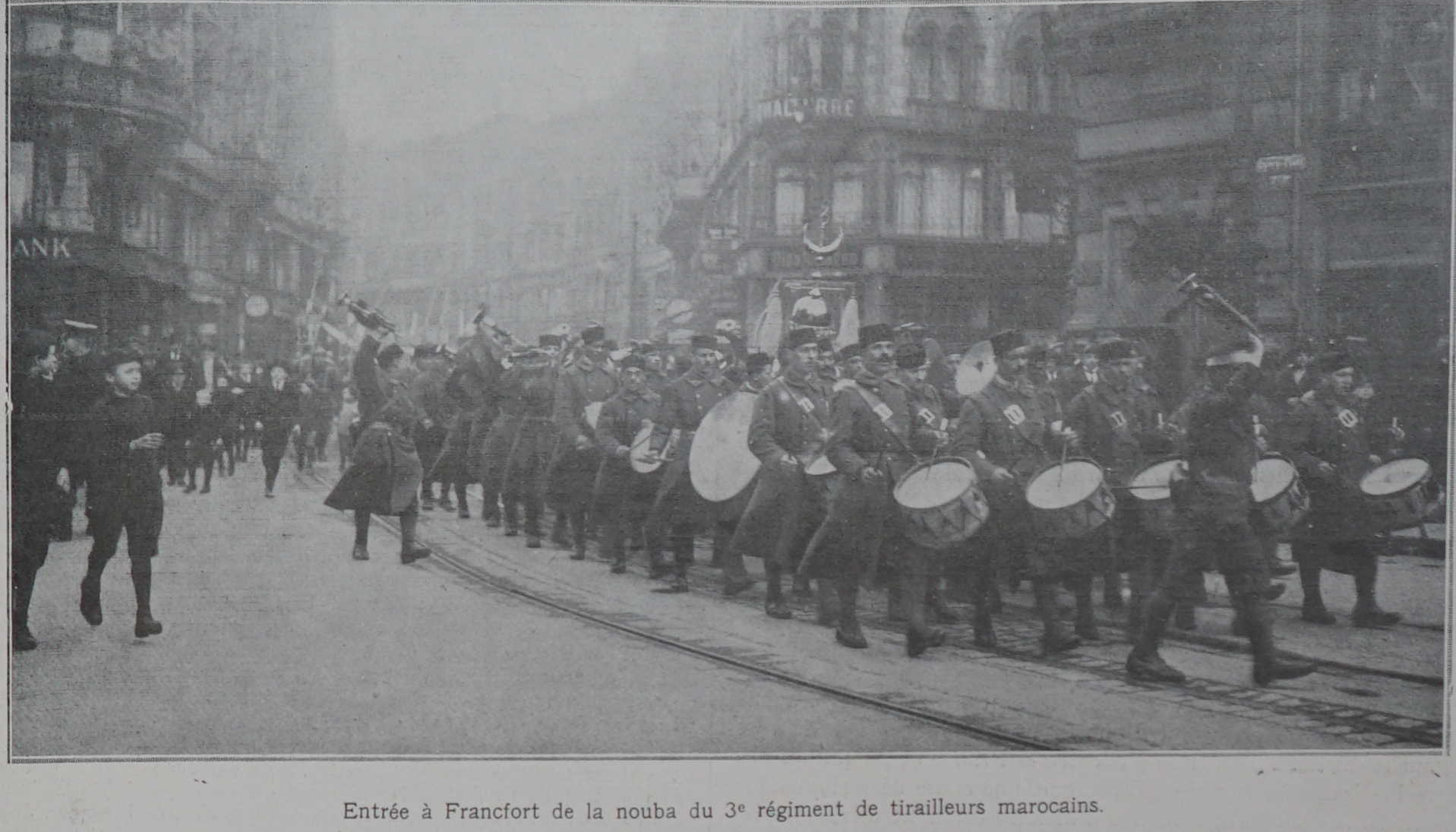
The band of the 3rd Moroccan Tirailleurs Regiment enetring Frankfurt 6 April 1920

The regiment has been dissolved and recreated a number of times. It was first formed in Morocco on 1 January 1920 as the "3e régiment de marche de tirailleurs marocains" (3RMTM) composed of three march battalions of auxiliary troops. They were dispatched to join the French Army of the Rhine. From April–May 1920 they took part in the French occupation of Frankfurt. Then in October it was reconstituted as the 63rd Moroccan Tirailleurs Regiment (R.T.N.A.). In November 1921 they returned to Morocco. They were sent to Taza in 1930. They remained here until 1934 when they were dissolved. The regiment was recreated in 1935 but dissolved following the fall of France in 1940. After a brief existence in 1941, it was re-established in 1943 and continued until 1945. The final incarnation was between 1948 and 1955.
