= Theodor Valentin Volkmar =

German jurist and politician

1st Lord Mayor of Marburg
- In office 1833–1835; 1835–1846
- Succeeded by: Adam Heinrich Wilhelm Uloth

Personal details
- Born: 23 November 1781; Frankenberg (Eder), Landgraviate of Hesse-Kassel
- Died: 8 February 1847 (aged 65); Marburg, Hesse-Kassel

Theodor Valentin Volkmar (23 November 1781 in Frankenberg (Eder) – 8 February 1847 in Marburg) was a German jurist and politician and two-time mayor of Marburg, from 1833 until 1835 and again from December 1835 until his retirement due to ill health November 1846.
