= Egon Vaupel =

German politician

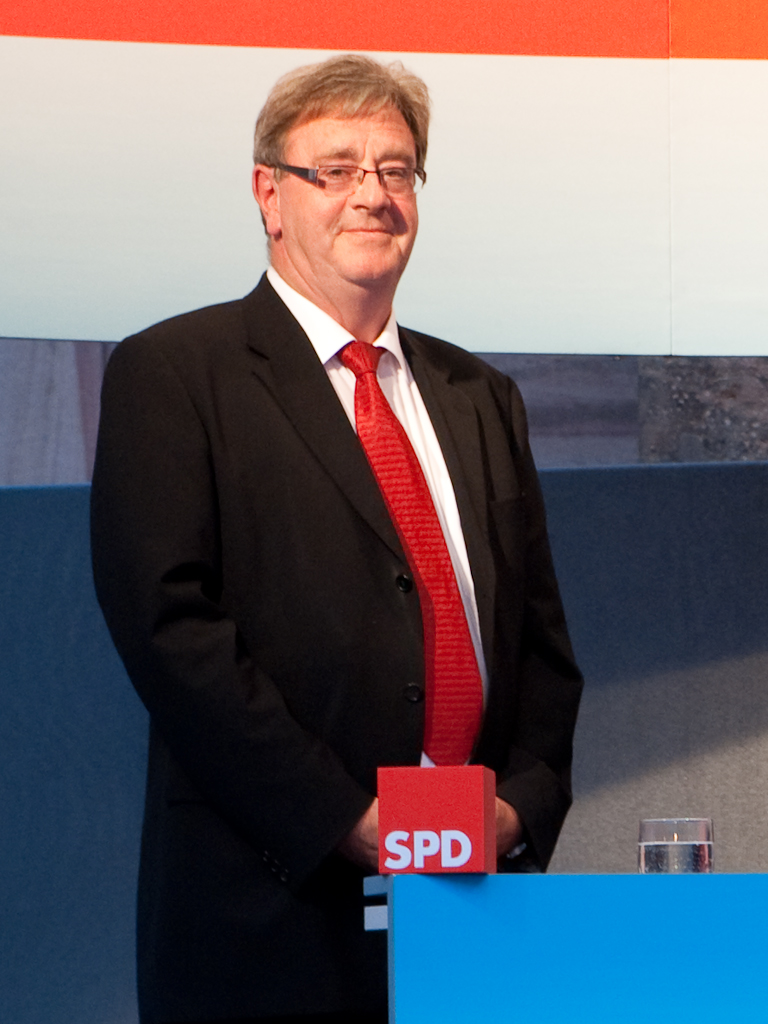

Mayor of Marburg
- In office 1 July 2005 – 1 July 2015
- Preceded by: Dietrich Möller
- Succeeded by: Thomas Spies

Personal details
- Born: 15 November 1950 (age 75) Bad Endbach, Germany
- Party: SPD
- Spouse: Rita Vaupel
- Children: 1
- Website: www.egon-vaupel.de

Egon Vaupel (born 15 November 1950 in Bad Endbach) is a German politician, member of the SPD, and the mayor of Marburg 2005 - 2015.

Political offices
Preceded by Dietrich Möller	Mayor of Marburg; 1 July 2005 – 1 July 2015	Succeeded by Thomas Spies
