= Paul Troje =

German politician

Mayor of Marburg
- In office 24 August 1907 – 30 September 1924
- Preceded by: Ludwig Schüler
- Succeeded by: Georg Voigt

Personal details
- Born: 21 January 1864; Warnow (Güstrow), German Confederation
- Died: 29 June 1942 (aged 78); Einbeck, German Reich

Paul Troje (21 January 1864 in Warnow (Güstrow) – 29 June 1942 in Einbeck) was a German politician and from 1893 to 1907 the mayor of Einbeck and from 24 August 1907 until 30 September 1924 mayor of Marburg.

| Preceded by Ludwig Schüler | Mayor of Marburg; 24 August 1907 – 30 September 1924 | Succeeded by Georg Voigt |
