= Friedrich Dickmann =

German politician

Mayor of Marburg
- In office 5 February 1946 – 31 July 1946
- Preceded by: Eugen Siebecke
- Succeeded by: Karl Theodor Bleek

Personal details
- Born: Wuppertal, Germany

Friedrich Dickmann was a German politician. He was the mayor of Marburg from 5 February until 31 July 1946.

Political offices
Preceded by Eugen Siebecke	Mayor of Marburg; 5 February 1946 – 31 July 1946	Succeeded by Karl Theodor Bleek
