= Walter Voß =

German jurist and politician

Mayor of Marburg
- In office 16 January 1942 – 6 April 1945
- Preceded by: Ernst Scheller
- Succeeded by: Eugen Siebecke

Personal details
- Born: 26 April 1885 Lampertheim
- Died: June 5, 1972 (aged 87) Marburg
- Party: NSDAP
- Profession: Jurist

External videos
- Walter Voß reports on the liberation of Marburg by American army in 1945.

Walter Voß (26 April 1885 in Neuschloß, Lampertheim – 5 June 1972 in Marburg) was a German jurist and politician. He was the mayor of Marburg from 1928–1945, from 16 January 1942 until 6 April 1945 he was temporary the Lord mayor of Marburg. He was buried in Braunschweig.

Preceded by Ernst Scheller	Mayor of Marburg; 16 January 1942 – 6 April 1945	Succeeded by Eugen Siebecke
