= Georg August Rudolph =

German politician

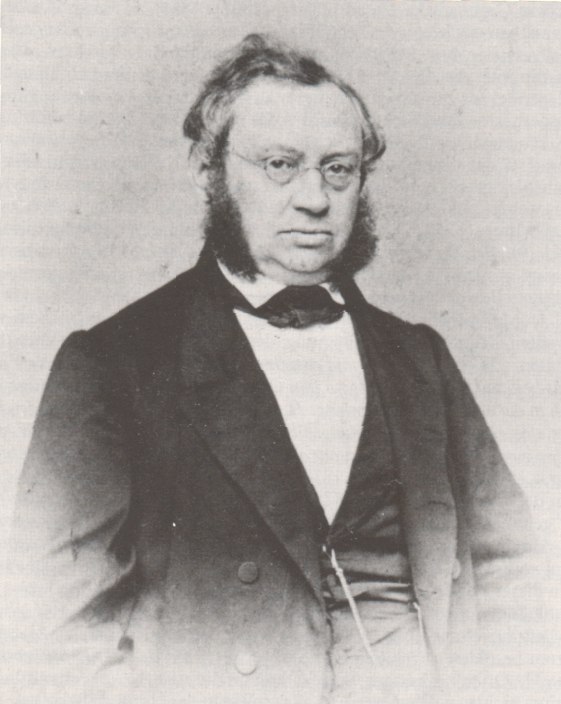
- Rudolph in 1862

Mayor of Marburg
- In office 4 December 1856 – 2 August 1884
- Preceded by: Adam Heinrich Wilhelm Uloth
- Succeeded by: Ludwig Schüler

Personal details
- Born: 25 September 1816 Kassel, Landgraviate of Hesse-Kassel
- Died: 13 December 1893 (aged 77) Marburg, German Empire
- Education: University of Marburg

Georg August Rudolph (25 September 1816 in Kassel – 13 December 1893 in Marburg) was a German politician and from 4 December 1856 until 2 August 1884 mayor of Marburg.

Preceded by Adam Heinrich Wilhelm Uloth	Mayor of Marburg; 4 December 1856 – 2 August 1884	Succeeded by Ludwig Schüler
