= Eugen Siebecke =

German politician

Mayor of Marburg
- In office 6 April 1945 – 5 February 1946
- Preceded by: Walter Voß
- Succeeded by: Friedrich Dickmann

Personal details
- Party: SPD

Eugen Siebecke was a German politician and member of the SPD. He was the mayor of Marburg from 6 April 1945 until 5 February 1946.

In 2012, a statue honoring Siebecke was built inside of the University of Marburg's library. It was not well received and removed in less than a year.

Political offices
Preceded by Walter Voß	Mayor of Marburg; 6 April 1945 – 5 February 1946	Succeeded by Friedrich Dickmann
