= Adam Heinrich Wilhelm Uloth =

German politician

Mayor of Marburg
- In office 4 November 1846 – 13 October 1856
- Preceded by: Theodor Valentin Volkmar
- Succeeded by: Georg August Rudolph

Personal details
- Born: 1 March 1804; Homberg (Efze), Landgraviate of Hesse-Kassel
- Died: 11 April 1885 (aged 81); Kassel-Wehlheiden, German Empire

Adam Heinrich Wilhelm Uloth (1 March 1804 in Homberg (Efze) – 11 April 1885 in Kassel-Wehlheiden) was a German politician and from 4 November 1846 until 13 October 1856 mayor of Marburg.

Preceded by Theodor Valentin Volkmar	Mayor of Marburg; 4 November 1846 – 13 October 1856	Succeeded by Georg August Rudolph
