= Ludwig Schüler =

German politician

Mayor of Marburg
- In office 17 September 1884 – 20 May 1907
- Preceded by: Georg August Rudolph
- Succeeded by: Paul Troje

Personal details
- Born: 6 January 1836 Kassel, Landgraviate of Hesse-Kassel
- Died: 31 March 1930 (aged 94) Marburg, German Reich
- Education: University of Marburg

Ludwig Schüler (6 January 1836 – 31 March 1930) was a German politician and from 17 September 1884 until 20 May 1907 mayor of Marburg. In January 1911 he was appointed honorary citizen.

Preceded by Georg August Rudolph	Mayor of Marburg; 17 September 1884 – 20 May 1907	Succeeded by Paul Troje
