= Karl Theodor Bleek =

German politician (1898–1969)

Mayor of Marburg
- In office 4 October 1946 – 30 June 1951
- Preceded by: Friedrich Dickmann
- Succeeded by: Georg Gaßmann

Personal details
- Born: 19 March 1898 Kirn, German Empire
- Died: 15 December 1969 (aged 71) Marburg, West Germany
- Party: FDP

Karl Theodor Bleek (19 March 1898 in Kirn – 15 December 1969 in Marburg) was a liberal German politician.

Bleek became a member of Progressive People's Party in 1909 and of the German Democratic Party in 1918. He became Landrat (head of a district) in Landkreis Arnswalde in 1932 and was removed from office by the new Nazi administration in May 1933. Later he was employed by the state again and finally he was treasurer ("Kämmerer") in Breslau. Bleek perhaps became a member of the Nazi party in 1942. Other sources like Hans-Peter Klausch, who listed all former Nazis on behalf of The Left does not mention this membership.

After World War II he was one of the founders of the Free Democratic Party and representative of the left wing of the party. Bleek was the first elected mayor of Marburg after World War II and was a member of the Landtag of Hesse until 1951, when he became a member of the Federal Ministry of the Interior (Germany). From 1957 until 1961, he was the head of the Bundespräsidialamt (Office of the Federal President), and, in 1963, he was elected president of the German National Academic Foundation (German: Studienstiftung).

Political offices
Preceded by Friedrich Dickmann	Mayor of Marburg; 4 October 1946 – 30 June 1951	Succeeded by Georg Gaßmann
