= Georg-Gaßmann-Stadion =

Football stadium in Marburg, Germany

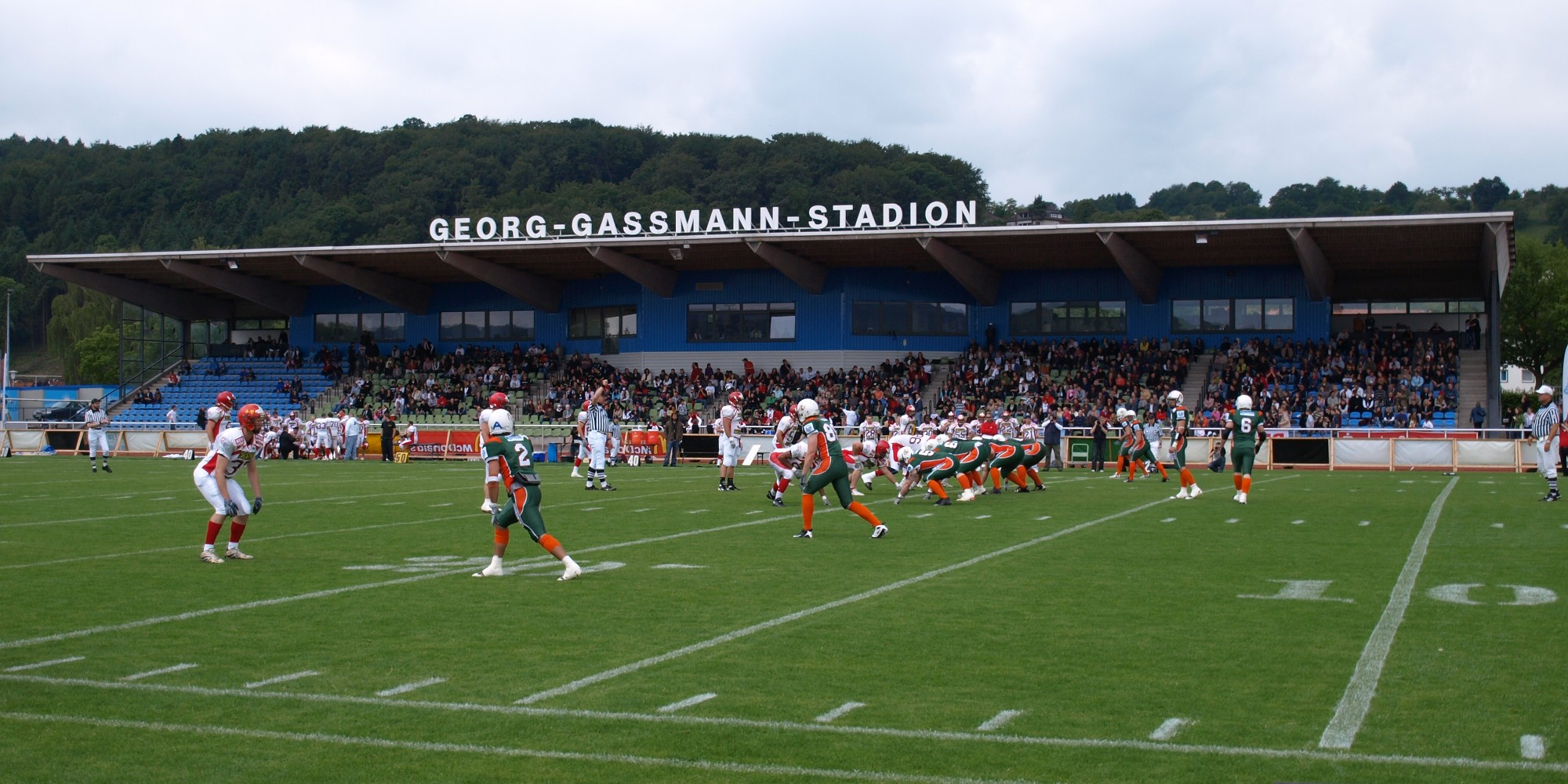
- The stadium on a matchday in June 2009
- Interactive map of Georg-Gaßmann-Stadion
- Full name: Georg-Gaßmann-Stadion
- Location: Ockershausen, Marburg
- Coordinates: 50°47′51.99″N 8°45′16.57″E
- Owner: City of Marburg
- Capacity: 15,000
- Surface: Grass
- Field size: 105 x 68 m

Construction
- Opened: 1967
- Renovated: 2001 & 2006–07

Tenants
- VfB Marburg (Association football); Marburg Mercenaries (American football)

The Georg-Gaßmann-Stadion is a multi-purpose stadium in the district of Ockershausen in Marburg, Germany, named after the former politician and mayor of the city, Georg Gaßmann.

The stadium, opened in 1967, is primarily used by the American football team Marburg Mercenaries, who play in the German Football League. VfB Marburg, the city's highest ranked association football team, also use the ground for friendlies and cup games against higher-ranked opponents. The Thorpe Cup athletics meetings in 2009 and 2010 were also held at the stadium.

With its 12,000 capacity, the Georg-Gaßmann-Stadion is the largest in the region of Mittelhessen.
