= VfB Marburg =

German football club

- Full name: Verein für Bewegungsspiele; 1905 Marburg e.V.
- Nickname: Die Schimmelreiter
- Founded: 13 May 1905; 121 years ago
- Ground: Stadion an der Gisselberger Straße
- Capacity: 4,000
- Chairman: Thomas Pfeiffer
- Trainer: Fabio Eidelwein
- League: Hessenliga (V)
- 2025–26: Hessenliga, 12th of 18
Home colours	Away colours

VfB Marburg is a German football club based in Marburg, Hesse, currently playing in the Hessenliga.

== History ==
VfB Marburg was established on 13 May 1905 as Marburger Fußball Club and in its first two years boasted over 100 members. In October 1908, the club changed its name to Verein für Bewegungsspiele 1905 Marburg as it began to include sports other than football.

In 1911, the footballers beat Bonner FV 6–0 and then 1. FC Nürnberg 5–2 on their way to capturing the first ever Akademikermeisterschaft with 1–0 victory over Holstein Kiel. The club finished as Hessian league champions before losing a re-match with Kiel in the Academic Championship. The club took part in the west German regional finals at the end of the 1912–13 season where they lost 7–1 to Union Düsseldorf.

During World War I the team suspended play until being re-established in February 1919. On 30 August 1925, they joined the Sportvereinigung Kurhessen Marburg to form Sportvereinigung VfB 05 Kurhessen. Following the 1933 reorganization of German football into 16 top-flight regional divisions under the Third Reich, the combined side became part of the Gauliga Hessen (I). They were sent down after a poor debut season in 1933–34, but were promoted back the following year. They were relegated again after two more seasons in the Gauliga before being forced to join TSV Marburg on 25 September 1937 to form VfL Marburg.

VfL Marburg failed in their attempt to win their way back to the Gauliga in 1938. The outbreak of World War II eventually made it difficult and dangerous to travel across the country and competition became more local in character. The team later rejoined what had become the Gauliga Kurhessen for three seasons from 1941 until 1944.

Play was interrupted by World War II and the team briefly disappeared before again being reformed as VfL Marburg late in 1945. Their first post-war match took place 9 September 1945 and they rejoined regular league play the following season. In front of 5,000 spectators, the club won the regional cup by beating FSV Frankfurt 2–0 and advanced on to the Verbandsliga Hessen (II), where they played just a single season. They club remained competitive with the reserve side winning state titles in 1957 and 1959. The first team became a fixture in the Amateurliga Hessen (III), winning a division title there in 1960 and returning a number of upper table finishes before slipping back to the Landesliga in 1966. It was not until 1985 that they were again able to advance following a Landesliga Mitte (V) title. VfL Marburg played four seasons as a lower table side in the Amateuroberliga Hessen (IV), narrowly missing relegation thanks to a playoff win over SpVgg Dietesheim (4–0) in 1988 before slipping back to the Landesliga the following year.

=== Since 1992 ===
On 9 April 1992, the football section of the sports club left to form a separate association reclaiming its historical identity as the Verein für Bewegungsspiele 1905 Marburg e.V. They returned to the Oberliga Hessen in 1999 and again narrowly missed relegation, this time because of the voluntary withdrawal of SV Germania Horbach. Due to financial problems, VfB Marburg were relegated in 2005. In the same year, former Marburg mayor Dietrich Möller became the new club president. After becoming Verbandsliga Hessen-Mitte champions in the 2008–09 season, VfB Marburg returned to the fifth-tier Hessenliga for two seasons before being relegated again in 2011.

== Stadium ==
VfB Marburg plays its home fixtures at the Stadion an der Gisselberger Straße which has a capacity of around 4,000 spectators. Friendlies against higher division clubs, as well youth team matches and cup games are usually held at the adjacent 12,000 capacity Georg-Gaßmann-Stadion.

== Honours ==
The club's honours:

- Deutscher Akademikermeister (German Academic Champions):
  - Champions: 1911
- Oberliga Hessen (III)
  - Champions: 1959
- Verbandsliga Hessen-Mitte (VI)
  - Champions: 1985, 1990, 1992, 1999, 2009, 2023
  - Runners-up: 1997, 1998

== Recent seasons ==
The recent season-by-season performances of VfB Marburg:

Season	Division	Tier	Position
1996–97	Landesliga Hessen-Mitte (V)	2nd	
1997–98	Landesliga Hessen-Mitte	V	2nd
1998–99	Landesliga Hessen-Mitte	V	1st ↑
1999–2000	Oberliga Hessen	IV	13th
2000–01	Oberliga Hessen	IV	14th
2001–02	Oberliga Hessen	IV	7th
2002–03	Oberliga Hessen	IV	7th
2003–04	Oberliga Hessen	IV	15th
2004–05	Oberliga Hessen	IV	18th ↓
2005–06	Landesliga Hessen-Mitte	V	10th
2006–07	Landesliga Hessen-Mitte	V	12th

Season	Division	Tier	Position
2007–08	Landesliga Hessen-Mitte	V	4th
2008–09	Verbandsliga Hessen-Mitte	VI	1st ↑
2009–10	Hessenliga	V	12th
2010–11	Hessenliga	V	18th ↓
2011–12	Verbandsliga Hessen-Mitte	VI	—
2012–13	Gruppenliga Gießen-Marburg	VII	8th
2013–14	Gruppenliga Gießen-Marburg	VII	16th ↓
2014–15	Kreisoberliga Nord	VIII	1st ↑
2015–16	Gruppenliga Gießen-Marburg	VII	6th
2016–17	Gruppenliga Gießen-Marburg	VII	
2017–18			

- With the introduction of the Regionalligas in 1994 and the 3. Liga in 2008 as the new third tier, below the 2. Bundesliga, all leagues below dropped one tier. Also in 2008, a large number of football leagues in Hesse were renamed, with the Oberliga Hessen becoming the Hessenliga, the Landesliga becoming the Verbandsliga, the Bezirksoberliga becoming the Gruppenliga and the Bezirksliga becoming the Kreisoberliga.

↑ Promoted	↓ Relegated

== Notable players ==
Past (and present) players who are the subjects of Wikipedia articles can be found here.
