= Ernst Scheller =

German Nazi Hauptmann and politician (1899–1942)

Mayor of Marburg
- In office 27 April 1934 – 16 January 1942
- Succeeded by: Walter Voß

Personal details
- Born: 18 July 1899 Lintel, East Frisia, German Empire
- Died: 16 January 1942 (aged 42) Simferopol
- Party: NSDAP

Ernst Scheller (18 July 1899 in Lintel (East Frisia) – 16 January 1942 in Simferopol) was a German Nazi Hauptmann and politician.

== Life and work ==
Scheller was appointed mayor of Marburg in 27.4.1934 by Adolf Hitler and fought on the Eastern Front during World War II. He was injured on 29 December 1941 in battle and died 18 days later on a lazaret in Simferopol. After his death Walter Voß worked commissarial in Marburg, from March 1944 until the end of the war as commissarial mayor.

Preceded by vacant	Mayor of Marburg; 27 April 1934 – 16 January 1942	Succeeded by Walter Voß
