= Georg Voigt (politician) =

German politician (1866–1927)

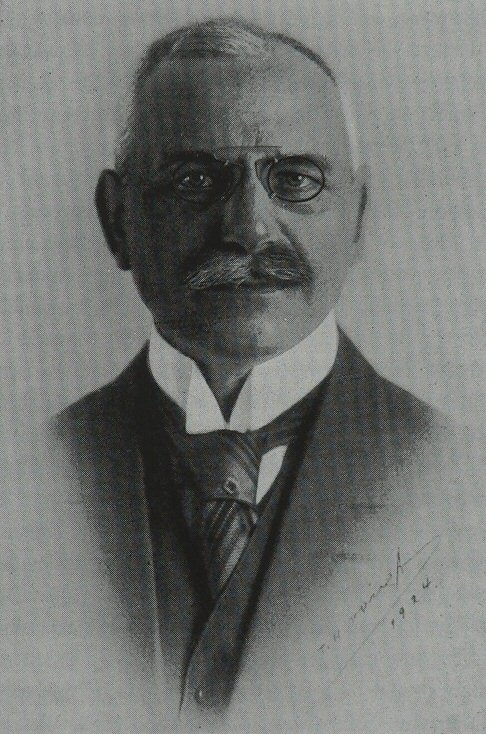

Mayor of Barmen
- In office 1906–1912
- Preceded by: Johannes Gustav Brodzina
- Succeeded by: Paul Hartmann

Mayor of Frankfurt
- In office 1912–1924
- Preceded by: Franz Adickes
- Succeeded by: Ludwig Landmann

Mayor of Marburg
- In office 12 February 1925 – 13 April 1927
- Preceded by: Paul Troje
- Succeeded by: Johannes Müller

Personal details
- Born: 16 September 1866 Klein-Schellmühl near Danzig, Prussia (Młyniska, Gdańsk)
- Died: 13 April 1927 (aged 60) Marburg, Weimar Germany
- Party: NLP / DDP
- Education: University of Breslau, Humboldt University of Berlin, University of Königsberg

Georg Philipp Wilhelm Voigt (16 September 1866 – 13 April 1927) was a German politician. Voigt was the mayor of Rixdorf, Barmen, Frankfurt, and Marburg.

== Political career ==
Voigt, the son of a hotelier, was born in Klein-Schellmühl near Danzig, Prussia (Młyniska, Gdańsk). He studied law between 1886 and 1890 at the universities of Breslau (Wrocław), Berlin and Königsberg (Kaliningrad). In 1899, Voigt became the mayor of Rixdorf (now a part of Berlin-Neukölln) and was also the mayor of Barmen between 1906 and 1912, before becoming the mayor of Frankfurt. He belonged to the moderate wing of the conservative-liberal National Liberal Party. From 1907 to 1912, he represented Barmen in the Prussian House of Lords. From 1912 to 1918, he represented Frankfurt in the Prussian House of Lords. After the German revolution of 1918–1919 he joined the German Democratic Party, which espoused social liberalism or progressivism.

Voigt was mayor during the French occupation of Frankfurt from 6 April to 17 May 1920. He issued a "severe warning" calling on the population to remain calm and follow the requests of the occupying troops following the Hauptwache Incident on 7 April. During his terms of office, the Goethe University Frankfurt, then known as the University of Frankfurt am Main, opened. Voigt was responsible for the city safeguarding the finances of the university after its endowment was virtually lost during the hyperinflation of the early Weimar Republic.

On 2 October 1924, Voigt lost the Frankfurt mayoral election by a vote of 36 to 25 to his Democratic Party colleague Ludwig Landmann. On 22 November 1924, Voigt was elected mayor of Marburg, serving from February 1925 until his death in April 1927. He was buried in Berlin-Zehlendorf. A street is named after Voigt in the Westend-Süd neighborhood of Frankfurt.
