= List of mayors of Marburg =

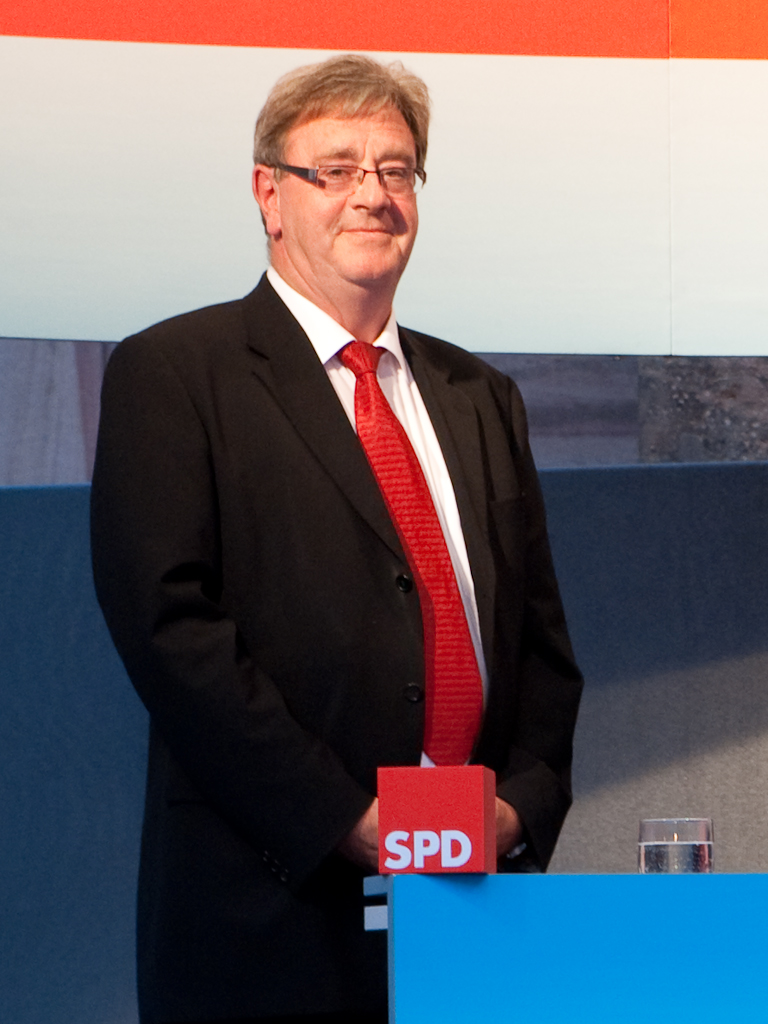
The previous mayor of Marburg, Egon Vaupel, at an election campaign event in September 2009.

This is a list of all the mayors of Marburg in Germany since 1835.

Mayor	from	until	Party
Theodor Valentin Volkmar	12 December 1835	3 November 1846	
Adam Heinrich Wilhelm Uloth	4 November 1846	13 October 1856	
Georg August Rudolph	4 December 1856	2 August 1884	
Ludwig Schüler	17 September 1884	20 May 1907	
Paul Troje	24 August 1907	30 September 1924	
Georg Voigt	12 February 1925	13 April 1927	DDP
Johannes Müller	17 May 1927	28 March 1933	
none	29 March 1933	26 April 1934	—
Ernst Scheller	27 April 1934	16 January 1942	NSDAP
Walter Voß	16 January 1942	6 April 1945	
Eugen Siebecke	6 April 1945	5 February 1946	SPD
Friedrich Dickmann	5 February 1946	31 July 1946	
Karl Theodor Bleek	4 October 1946	30 June 1951	FDP
Georg Gaßmann	10 August 1951	11 September 1970	SPD
Hanno Drechsler	11 September 1970	31 December 1992	SPD
Dietrich Möller	1 January 1993	30 June 2005	CDU
Egon Vaupel	1 July 2005	30 November 2015	SPD
Thomas Spies	1 December 2015	Incumbent	SPD
