= Georg Gaßmann =

German politician

Mayor of Marburg
- In office 10 August 1951 – 11 September 1970
- Preceded by: Karl Theodor Bleek
- Succeeded by: Hanno Drechsler

Personal details
- Born: 28 May 1910 Marburg, Germany
- Died: 5 August 1987 (aged 77) Marburg, West Germany
- Party: SPD
- Education: University of Marburg

Georg Gaßmann (28 May 1910 in Marburg – 5 August 1987 in Marburg) was a German politician.

As a member of the SPD, Gaßmann was the mayor of Marburg for nearly 20 years and a member of the Hessian Landtag in Wiesbaden.

After serving as a politician, Gaßmann was awarded the Großes Verdienstkreuz, one of the German Federal Crosses of Merit. The Georg-Gaßmann-Stadion in Marburg was also named in his honour. In 1954 he was a member of the second and in 1964 of the fourth Federal Assembly .

Political offices
Preceded by Karl Theodor Bleek	Mayor of Marburg; 10 August 1951 – 11 September 1970	Succeeded by Hanno Drechsler
