= Gaja-la-Selve =

Commune in Occitanie, France

Gaja La Selve
- Commune
- Location of Gaja La Selve
- Location within France Location within Occitanie
- Coordinates: 43°11′47″N 1°53′48″E
- Country: France
- Region: Occitania
- Department: Aude
- Arrondissement: Carcassonne
- Canton: La Piège au Razès
- Intercommunality: Piège Lauragais Malepère

Government
  - Mayor (2020–2026): Régis Calmon
- Area^{1}: 11.38 km^{2} (4.39 sq mi)
- Elevation: 325 m (1,066 ft)
- Highest elevation: 374 m (1,227 ft)
- Lowest elevation: 273 m (896 ft)
- Population (2023): 134
  - Density: 11.8/km^{2} (30.5/sq mi)
- Time zone: UTC+01:00 (CET)
  - Summer (DST): UTC+02:00 (CEST)
- INSEE/Postal code: 11159 /11270
- ^{1} French Land Register data, which excludes lakes, ponds, glaciers > 1 km^{2} (0.386 sq mi or 247 acres) and river estuaries.

Gaja la Selve (French pronunciation: [ɡaʒa la sɛlv]; Occitan: Gajan de la Selva) is a commune in the Aude department in southern France.

== Population ==
Historical population
Year	Pop.	±% p.a.
1968	127	—
1975	110	−2.03%
1982	129	+2.30%
1990	133	+0.38%
1999	126	−0.60%
2007	162	+3.19%
2012	141	−2.74%
2017	143	+0.28%
2023	134	−1.08%
Source: INSEE

== See also ==
- Communes of the Aude department
