= Avignonet massacre =

Part of the Albigensian Crusade (1242)

Coordinates: 43.3666°N 1.7897°E

Blessed Martyrs of Avignonet a.k.a. "Blessed Guillaume Arnaud and 10 Companions"
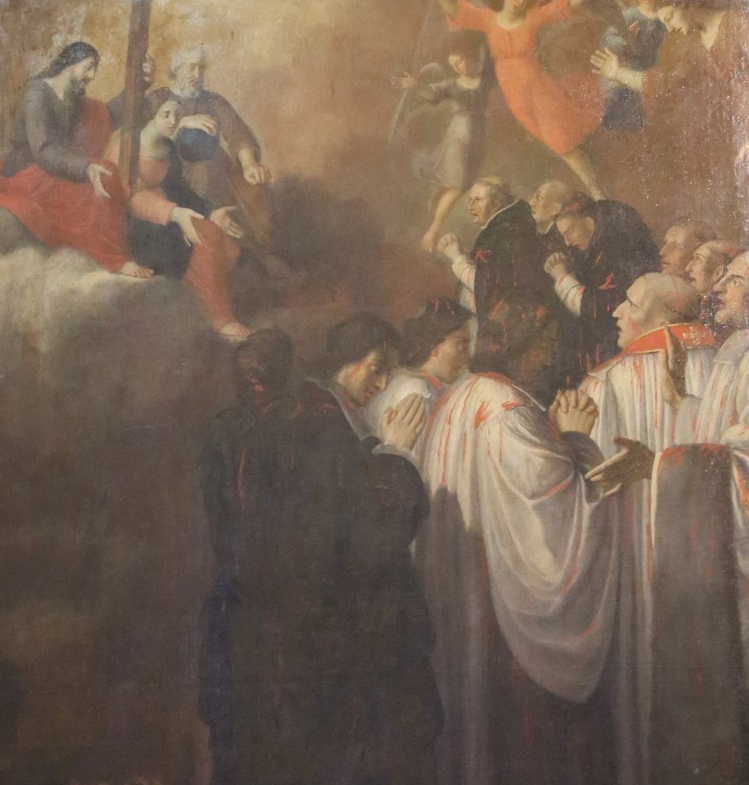
- Painting depicting the Blessed Martyrs of Avignonet

Martyrs
- Died: 28 May 1242; Avignonet-Lauragais, France
- Honored in: Roman Catholic Church
- Beatified: 6 September 1866, Rome by Pope Pius IX
- Feast: 29 May
- Attributes: Religious habits Martyr's palm Swords piercing their bodies Murdered by Cathars

The Avignonet massacre occurred on the eve of 28 May 1242 when a small force, mainly consisting of Cathars, massacred a group of inquisitors during the Albigensian Crusade.

Guillaume Arnaud and Etienne de Saint-Thibery, the chief inquisitors of the County of Toulouse were visiting Avignonet. Arnaud and Saint-Thibery were lodged at the castle of Raymond VII, Count of Toulouse. The count's nephew, Raymond d'Alfaro sent a letter to Montsegur, where there were a number of prominent Cathars, including Pierre Roger. The letter informed Pierre Roger that the inquisitors were in Avignonet.

Pierre Roger set out for Avignonet with about 15 knights and 40 horse riding sergeants, which was about half of his Montsegur garrison. Pierre Roger stopped at the town of Gaja-la-Selve, taking up a reserve position while the others continued.

By nightfall, the raiders had arrived at Avignonet. A messenger continued to give them information about the activities of the inquisitors. Sympathetic locals opened the gates for the raiders and twelve knights and fifteen locals marched toward the castle. The raiders broke down the castle door and hacked the inquisitors to death. Eleven men died. The castle was then looted.

The massacre was celebrated by Cathars in short vernacular songs (coblas esparsas). Eventually, the French government decided to crack down on the Cathars, resulting in the Siege of Montségur from 1243 to 1244.

== Victims ==
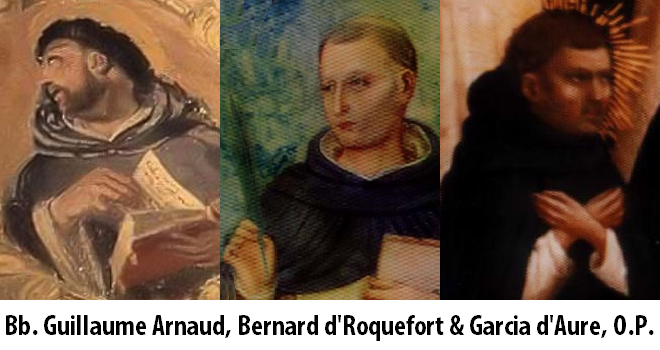
Three of the martyrs' images: the Dominicans Guillaume Arnaud, Bernard d'Roquefort and Garcia d'Aure.

The twelve victims at Avignonet were:

- William Arnaud, a Dominican, the inquisitor
- Stephen of Saint-Thibéry, a Franciscan, the assistant Inquisitor
- Garcia d'Aure, a Dominican lay brother
- Bernard de Roquefort, a Dominican
- Raymond Carbonier, the representative of the bishop
- Raymond Cortisan, an archdeacon
- Pierre d'Arnaud, a lay notary
- Fortanerius, a Franciscan
- Ademar, a monk of Chiusa
- two Benedictine monks
- the prior of Avignonet

They are recognized as martyrs by the Catholic Church and were beatified on 6 September 1866 by Pope Pius IX.
