= Downfall of the Derg (holiday) =

National holiday of Ethiopia on 28 May

- Observed by: Ethiopia
- Type: National
- Significance: Fall of the Derg
- Date: 28 May
- Frequency: Annual

The Downfall of the Derg (Amharic: ደርግ የወደቀበት ቀን) is a national holiday in Ethiopia celebrated on 28 May in commemoration of the fall of communist military junta Derg by the rebel coalition Ethiopian People's Revolutionary Democratic Front (EPRDF) in 1991. The day also pay homage to victims of the Ethiopian Civil War casualties and the Red Terror. Visitors often visited memorial places in this day such as "Red Terror" Martyrs' Memorial Museum in Addis Ababa.
