= Ockershausen =

- Borough of Marburg
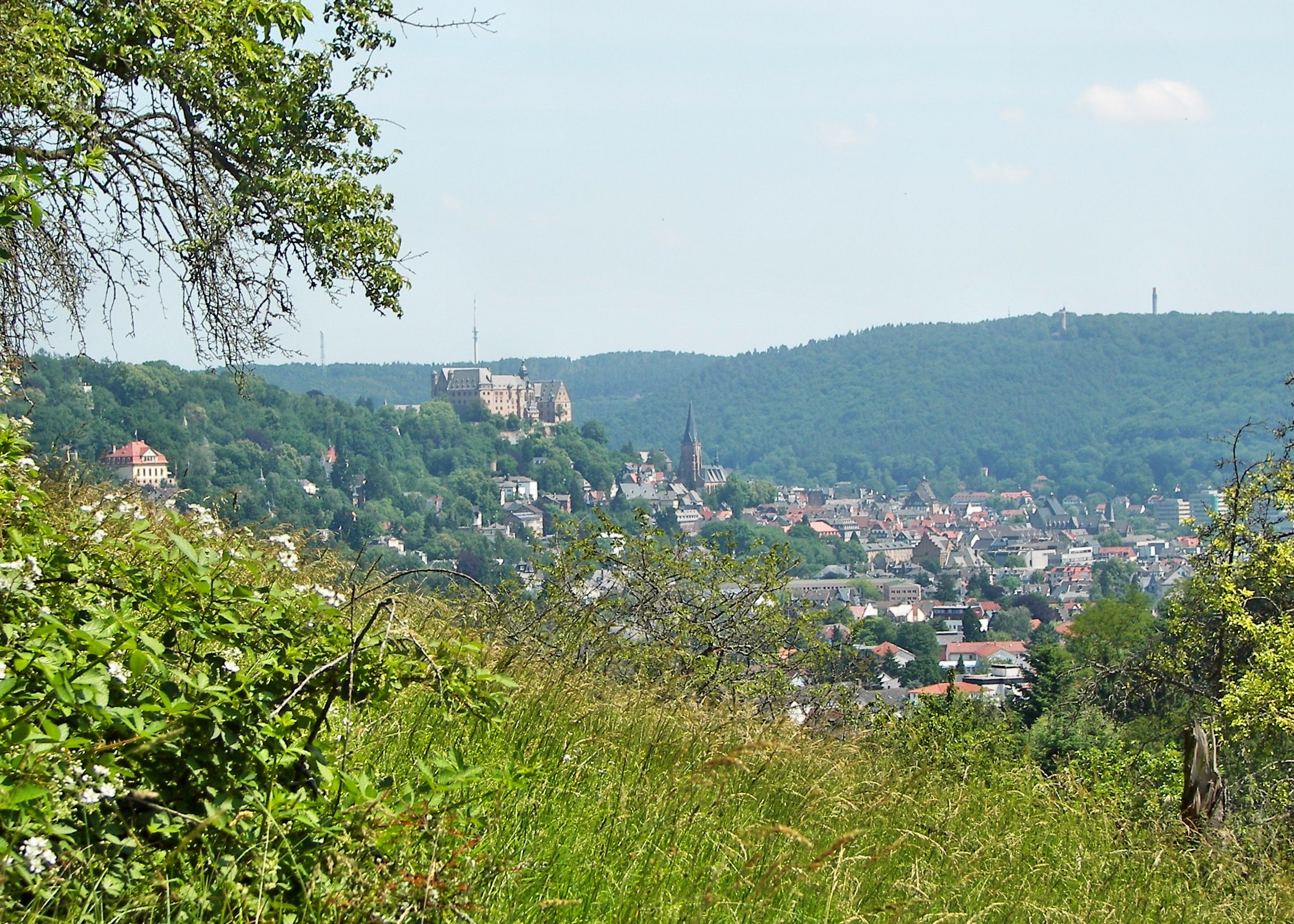
- View of Marburg Castle from high ground above Ockershausen

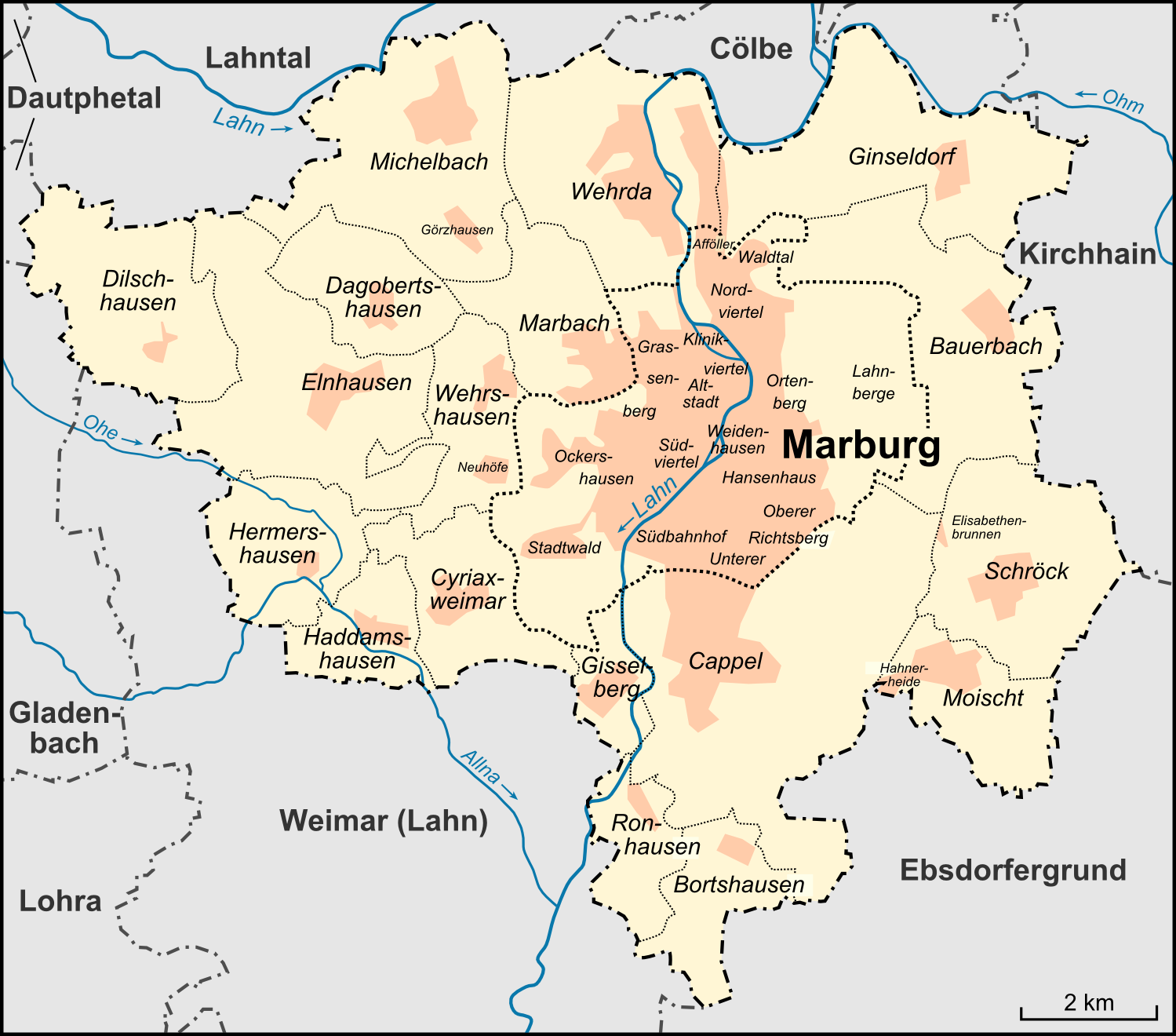
- City Quarter (Stadtteile) of Marburg
- Interactive map of Ockershausen
- Location within Germany Location within Hesse
- Coordinates: 50°48′3″N 8°44′56″E
- Country: Germany
- State: Hesse
- District: Marburg-Biedenkopf
- Town: Marburg
- Elevation: 201 m (659 ft)

Population (2010-12-31)
  - Total: 4,717
- Time zone: UTC+01:00 (CET)
  - Summer (DST): UTC+02:00 (CEST)
- Postal codes: 35037
- Dialling codes: 06421

Ockershausen is a borough (Ortsbezirk) of Marburg in Hesse.
