= William Arnaud (inquisitor) =

Dominican inquisitor, martyr (died 1242)

Blessed William Arnaud O.P.
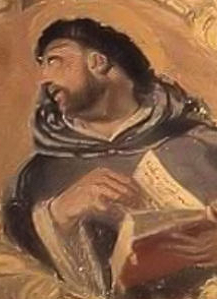
- Born: Montpellier, France
- Died: 28 May 1242; Avignonet-Lauragais, Haute-Garonne, France
- Venerated in: Roman Catholic Church
- Beatified: 6 September 1866, Saint Peter's Basilica, Papal States by Pope Pius IX

William Arnaud or Guillaume Arnaud (died 28 May 1242) was a Dominican inquisitor and martyr.

William was a native of Montpellier. In 1234, Pope Gregory IX named him inquisitor in the dioceses of Agen, Albi, Carcassonne and Toulouse. He was also active with Pierre Seilan in the diocese of Cahors. He was learned in canon law and gained a reputation for zealousness in his inquisitorial duties. He raised enough opposition that he was banished from Toulouse in October 1235 and only allowed back in March 1236 after papal intercession with the count. The Chronicle of Guillaume Pelhisson is an important source for William's inquests, since Pelhisson had access to its now lost records. He appears to have been the most active inquisitor in the region in the 1230s.

On 28 May 1242, William and eleven others were massacred at Avignonet. Their murder was arranged by the bailiff, Raymond of Alfaro, perhaps with the tacit agreement of Count Raymond VII of Toulouse. The murderers themselves came from the castle of Montségur. None of the murderers were ever punished. The Cathars celebrated William's death, even composing songs in Occitan about it, according to an inquisitorial deposition from 1244. The Cathar leader Pierre-Roger de Mirepoix expressed a desire to drink wine from William's skull, had it not been crushed to pieces. The fictionalized but historically based account in the Novas de l'heretje is probably referring to William under the name "Huc Arnaut":

Per quels Prezicadors no se volon cessar,
Nil savis Huc Arnaut anc no s'i volc palpar,
Per que li fals heretje l'an fag lo cap trencar;
Fraire B. de Caus lo volc de recemblar.

Translation:

These preachers do not wish to stop,
nor did the learned Huc Arnaut ever hold back,
which is why the false heretics have had him decapitated;
Friar Bernard de Caux wants to emulate him.

Catholics reported miracles following the deaths at Avignonet, but it was not until 6 September 1866 that they were beatified by Pope Pius IX. William is listed in the revised Roman Martyrology of 2004, but not in the General Roman Calendar.

== Bibliography ==
- Barber, Malcolm (2014) [2000]. The Cathars: Dualist Heretics in Languedoc in the High Middle Ages. Routledge.
- Dossat, Yves (1971). "Le massacre d'Avignonet". Cahiers de Fanjeaux. 6 (1): 343–359. doi:10.3406/cafan.1971.1024. S2CID 254727895.
- Léglu, Catherine (2002). "Vernacular Poems and Inquisitors in Languedoc and Champagne, ca. 1242–1249". Viator. 33: 117–132. doi:10.1484/J.VIATOR.2.300542.
- Oldenbourg, Zoé (1961). Massacre at Montségur: A History of the Albiegensian Crusade. Translated by Peter Green. Pantheon Books.
- Starrs, P. M. (2003). "William Arnaud, Bl.". New Catholic Encyclopedia. Vol. 14: Thi–Zwi (2nd ed.). Gale. p. 731.
- Taylor, Claire (2011). Heresy, Crusade and Inquisition in Medieval Quercy. York Medieval Press.
- Watkins, Basil (2016). The Book of Saints: A Comprehensive Biographical Dictionary (8th rev. ed.). Bloomsbury.
