= 2002 DFB-Ligapokal final =

German League Cup
- Event: 2002 DFB-Ligapokal
Schalke 04	Hertha BSC
1	4
- Date: 1 August 2002
- Venue: Ruhrstadion, Bochum
- Referee: Hartmut Strampe (Handorf)
- Attendance: 11,200

The 2002 DFB-Ligapokal final decided the winner of the 2002 DFB-Ligapokal, the 6th edition of the reiterated DFB-Ligapokal, a knockout football cup competition.

The match was played on 1 August 2002 at the Ruhrstadion in Bochum. Hertha BSC won the match 4–1 against Schalke 04, an exact repeat of the previous final, for their 2nd title.

== Teams ==
Team	Qualification for tournament	Previous appearances (bold indicates winners)
Schalke 04	2001–02 DFB-Pokal winners and 2001–02 Bundesliga fifth place	1 (2001)
Hertha BSC^{TH}	2001–02 Bundesliga fourth place	2 (2000, **2001**)

== Route to the final ==
The DFB-Ligapokal is a six team single-elimination knockout cup competition. There are a total of two rounds leading up to the final. Four teams enter the preliminary round, with the two winners advancing to the semi-finals, where they will be joined by two additional clubs who were given a bye. For all matches, the winner after 90 minutes advances. If still tied, extra time, and if necessary penalties are used to determine the winner.

Schalke 04		Round	Hertha BSC
Opponent	Result	2002 DFB-Ligapokal	Opponent	Result
Bye		Preliminary round	Bayern Munich	2–2 (4–3 p)
Bayer Leverkusen	2–0	Semi-finals	Borussia Dortmund	2–1

== Match ==
=== Details ===
1 August 2002
17:45 CEST

Schalke 04	1–4	Hertha BSC
Agali 61'	Report	Marcelinho 32', 84' (pen.); Alex Alves 33'; Pinto 89'

Ruhrstadion, Bochum
Attendance: 11,200
Referee: Hartmut Strampe (Handorf)

**Schalke 04**	**Hertha BSC**

GK	1	(Germany) Frank Rost	Booked
RB	18	(Netherlands) Niels Oude Kamphuis		(substituted off) 40'
CB	6	(Poland) Tomasz Hajto
CB	12	(Netherlands) Marco van Hoogdalem
LB	3	(Argentina) Aníbal Matellán
DM	20	(Denmark) Christian Poulsen
CM	17	(Belgium) Sven Vermant		(substituted off) 70'
CM	7	(Germany) Andreas Möller (c)
CM	8	(Germany) Jörg Böhme	Booked	(substituted off) 46'
CF	22	(Nigeria) Victor Agali
CF	11	(Denmark) Ebbe Sand
Substitutes:
GK	27	(Germany) Oliver Reck
DF	32	(Germany) Christian Pander
MF	5	(Germany) Sven Kmetsch	Booked	(substituted on) 40'
MF	19	(Germany) Mike Büskens
MF	35	(Czech Republic) Filip Trojan
FW	14	(Germany) Gerald Asamoah		(substituted on) 46'
FW	34	(Nigeria) Abdul Iyodo		(substituted on) 70'
Manager:
(Germany) Frank Neubarth

GK	1	(Hungary) Gábor Király
RB	19	(Germany) Andreas Schmidt		(substituted off) 73'
CB	3	(Germany) Arne Friedrich
CB	14	(Croatia) Josip Šimunić	Booked
LB	21	(Germany) Michael Hartmann	Booked
CM	25	(Netherlands) Rob Maas
CM	20	(Germany) Andreas Neuendorf		(substituted off) 67'
RW	13	(Poland) Bartosz Karwan		(substituted off) 79'
AM	10	(Brazil) Marcelinho	Booked
LW	8	(Belgium) Bart Goor (c)
CF	7	(Brazil) Alex Alves	Booked
Substitutes:
GK	12	(Germany) Christian Fiedler
DF	5	(Greece) Kostas Konstantinidis
MF	16	(Portugal) Roberto Pinto		(substituted on) 79'
MF	18	(Hungary) Pál Dárdai
MF	23	(Germany) René Tretschok		(substituted on) 67'
MF	32	(Germany) Thorben Marx		(substituted on) 73'
FW	11	(Germany) Michael Preetz
Manager:
(Netherlands) Huub Stevens
