= List of Hertha BSC records and statistics =

This article has details on Hertha BSC Berlin statistics.

== Recent seasons ==
Season	Division	Position	Points	Goal difference	Top goalscorer(s)	Cup	Europe
1988–89	2. Bundesliga (II)	13th	36:40	+1	(Germany) Theo Gries 9	–	–
1989–90	2. Bundesliga (II)	1st	53:23	+26	(Germany) Theo Gries 18	R1	–
1990–91	Bundesliga (I)	18th	14:54	−47	(Germany) Theo Gries 6	R2	–
1991–92	2. Bundesliga Nord (II)	3rd	35:29	+5	(Germany) Theo Gries 11	R1	–
1992–93	2. Bundesliga (II)	5th	53:39	+27	(Germany) Theo Gries 23	R4	–
1993–94	2. Bundesliga (II)	11th	37:39	+6	(Germany) Frank Schmöller 12	R2	–
1994–95	2. Bundesliga (II)	11th	32:36	−4	(Germany) Mike Lünsmann 11	R1	–
1995–96	2. Bundesliga (II)	14th	45	+2	(Croatia) Niko Kovač 11	R2	–
1996–97	2. Bundesliga (II)	3rd	58	+19	(Germany) Axel Kruse 15	R2	–
1997–98	Bundesliga (I)	11th	43	−12	(Germany) Michael Preetz 14	R2	–
1998–99	Bundesliga (I)	3rd	62	+27	(Germany) Michael Preetz 23	R3	–
1999–2000	Bundesliga (I)	6th	50	−7	(Germany) Michael Preetz 12	R4	CL R2
2000–01	Bundesliga (I)	5th	56	+6	(Germany) Michael Preetz 16	R2	UC R3
2001–02	Bundesliga (I)	4th	61	+23	(Brazil) Marcelinho 13	QF	UC R3
2002–03	Bundesliga (I)	5th	54	+9	(Brazil) Marcelinho 14	R1	UC R4
2003–04	Bundesliga (I)	12th	39	−17	(Brazil) Marcelinho 8	R3	UC R1
2004–05	Bundesliga (I)	4th	58	+28	(Brazil) Marcelinho 18	R2	–
2005–06	Bundesliga (I)	6th	48	+4	(Brazil) Marcelinho 12	R3	UC R3
2006–07	Bundesliga (I)	10th	44	−5	(Serbia) Marko Pantelić 14	QF	UC R1
2007–08	Bundesliga (I)	10th	44	−5	(Serbia) Marko Pantelić 13	R2	–
2008–09	Bundesliga (I)	4th	63	+7	(Ukraine) Andriy Voronin 11	R2	UC R2
2009–10	Bundesliga (I)	18th	24	−22	(Colombia) Adrián Ramos 10	R2	EL R2
2010–11	2. Bundesliga (II)	1st	74	+41	(Colombia) Adrián Ramos 15	R2	–
2011–12	Bundesliga (I)	16th	31	−26	(Germany) Pierre-Michel Lasogga 8	QF	–
2012–13	2. Bundesliga (II)	1st	76	+37	(Brazil) Ronny 18	R1	–
2013–14	Bundesliga (I)	11th	41	−8	(Colombia) Adrián Ramos 16	R2	–
2014–15	Bundesliga (I)	15th	35	−16	(Germany) Julian Schieber 7	R2	–
2015–16	Bundesliga (I)	7th	50	0	(Ivory Coast) Salomon Kalou 14	SF	–
2016–17	Bundesliga (I)	6th	49	−4	(Bosnia and Herzegovina) Vedad Ibišević 12	R3	–
2017–18	Bundesliga (I)	10th	43	−3	(Ivory Coast) Salomon Kalou 12	R2	EL R1
2018–19	Bundesliga (I)	11th	43	−8	(Slovakia) Ondrej Duda 11	R3	–
2019–20	Bundesliga (I)	10th	41	−11	(Bosnia and Herzegovina) Vedad Ibišević 7 (Belgium) Dodi Lukebakio 7	R3	–
2020–21	Bundesliga (I)	14th	35	−11	(Colombia) Jhon Córdoba 7 (Brazil) Matheus Cunha 7 (Poland) Krzysztof Piątek 7	R1	–
2021–22	Bundesliga (I)	16th	33	−34	(Montenegro) Stevan Jovetić 6	R3	–
2022–23	Bundesliga (I)	18th	29	−27	(Belgium) Dodi Lukebakio 11	R1	–
2023–24	2. Bundesliga (II)	9th	48	+10	(Switzerland) Haris Tabaković 22	QF	–
2024–25	2. Bundesliga (II)	11th	44	−2	(Germany) Fabian Reese 11	R16	–
2025–26	2. Bundesliga (II)	7th	51	+3	(Germany) Fabian Reese 10	QF	

=== Coaches since 1963 ===
No.	Coach	From	To	Record					Trophies won
No.	Coach	From	To	G	W	D	L	Win %	Trophies won
1	(Germany) Jupp Schneider	1 July 1963	9 March 1965	55	16	14	25	29.09	None
2	(Germany) Gerhard Schulte	9 March 1965	30 June 1966	38	32	3	3	84.21	1965–66 Regionalliga Berlin
3	(Germany) Helmut Kronsbein	1 July 1966	13 March 1974	223	92	53	78	41.26	None
4	(Germany) Hans "Gustav" Eder	17 March 1974	30 June 1974	9	3	1	5	33.33	None
5	(Germany) Dettmar Cramer	1 July 1974	9 July 1974	0	0	0	0	—	None
6	(Germany) Hans "Gustav" Eder	10 July 1974	16 July 1974	0	0	0	0	—	None
7	(Germany) Georg Kessler	17 July 1974	30 June 1977	118	54	26	38	45.76	None
8	(Germany) Kuno Klötzer	1 July 1977	27 October 1979	94	38	25	31	40.43	None
9	(Germany) Hans "Gustav" Eder	28 October 1979	26 December 1979	7	1	3	3	14.29	None
10	(Germany) Helmut Kronsbein	27 December 1979	30 June 1980	19	8	3	8	42.11	None
11	(Germany) Uwe Klimaschewski	1 July 1980	8 December 1981	62	41	5	16	66.13	None
12	(Germany) Georg Gawliczek	9 December 1981	10 December 1983	59	20	15	24	33.90	None
13	(Germany) Martin Luppen	11 December 1983	25 May 1984	43	16	12	15	37.21	None
14	(Germany) Hans "Gustav" Eder	26 May 1984	30 June 1984	0	0	0	0	—	None
15	(Germany) Uwe Kliemann	1 July 1984	11 November 1985	61	16	23	22	26.23	None
16	(Germany) Hans "Gustav" Eder	11 November 1985	31 December 1985	1	0	1	0	0.00	None
17	(Germany) Rudi Gutendorf	1 January 1986	18 April 1986	13	2	5	6	15.38	None
18	(Germany) Jürgen Sundermann	19 April 1986	8 October 1988	18	4	5	9	22.22	None
19	(Germany) Werner Fuchs	13 October 1988	13 November 1990	79	33	22	24	41.77	1989–90 2. Bundesliga
20	(Hungary) Pál Csernai	13 November 1990	12 March 1991	6	1	3	2	16.67	None
21	(Germany) Peter Neururer	13 March 1991	28 May 1991	12	0	2	10	0.00	None
22	(Germany) Karsten Heine	28 May 1991	30 June 1991	3	1	0	2	33.33	None
23	(Germany) Bernd Stange	1 July 1991	20 August 1992	41	14	12	15	34.15	None
24	(Germany) Günter Sebert	21 August 1992	20 October 1993	55	24	19	12	43.64	None
25	(Germany) Karsten Heine	20 October 1993	23 October 1993	1	0	0	1	0.00	None
26	(Germany) Uwe Reinders	24 October 1993	23 March 1994	11	2	4	5	18.18	None
27	(Germany) Karsten Heine	23 March 1994	31 December 1995	70	23	23	24	32.86	None
28	(Germany) Jürgen Röber	1 January 1996	6 February 2002	227	112	57	58	49.34	2001 DFB-Ligapokal
29	(Germany) Falko Götz (interim)	6 February 2002	30 June 2002	13	9	1	3	69.23	None
30	(Netherlands) Huub Stevens	1 July 2002	4 December 2003	64	25	17	22	39.06	2002 DFB-Ligapokal
31	(Germany) Andreas Thom (interim)	4 December 2003	17 December 2003	3	0	2	1	0.00	None
32	(Germany) Hans Meyer	1 January 2004	30 June 2004	17	7	5	5	41.18	None
33	(Germany) Falko Götz	1 July 2004	10 April 2007	121	47	40	34	38.84	None
34	(Germany) Karsten Heine (interim)	10 April 2007	30 June 2007	6	3	0	3	50.00	None
35	(Switzerland) Lucien Favre	1 July 2007	28 September 2009	94	40	20	34	42.55	None
36	(Germany) Karsten Heine (interim)	29 September 2009	3 October 2009	1	0	0	1	0.00	None
37	(Germany) Friedhelm Funkel	3 October 2009	30 June 2010	33	7	10	16	21.21	None
38	(Germany) Markus Babbel	1 July 2010	18 December 2011	55	30	13	12	54.55	2010–11 2. Bundesliga
39	(Germany) Rainer Widmayer (interim)	18 December 2011	21 December 2011	1	1	0	0	100.00	None
40	(Germany) Michael Skibbe	22 December 2011	12 February 2012	5	0	0	5	0.00	None
41	(Germany) René Tretschok (interim)	14 February 2012	19 February 2012	1	0	0	1	0.00	None
42	(Germany) Otto Rehhagel	19 February 2012	30 June 2012	14	3	3	8	21.43	None
43	(Netherlands) Jos Luhukay	1 July 2012	5 February 2015	71	34	18	19	47.89	2012–13 2. Bundesliga
44	(Hungary) Pál Dárdai	5 February 2015	30 June 2019	172	64	44	64	37.21	None
45	(Croatia) Ante Čović	1 July 2019	27 November 2019	14	4	3	7	28.57	None
46	(Germany) Jürgen Klinsmann	27 November 2019	11 February 2020	10	3	3	4	30.00	None
47	(Germany) Bruno Labbadia	9 April 2020	24 January 2021	28	8	6	14	28.57	None
48	(Hungary) Pál Dárdai	25 January 2021	29 November 2021	32	9	10	13	28.13	None
49	(Turkey) Tayfun Korkut	29 November 2021	13 March 2022	14	2	3	9	14.29	None
50	(Germany) Felix Magath	13 March 2022	23 May 2022	9	3	1	5	33.33	None
51	(Germany) Sandro Schwarz	19 June 2022	16 April 2023	13	2	5	6	15.38	None
52	(Germany) Stefan Leitl	18 February 2025	Present	0	0	0	0	—	None

== Honours ==
=== League ===
- German Champions: 2
  - Winners: 1930, 1931
  - Runners-up: 1926, 1927, 1928, 1929, 1975
- 2. Bundesliga Champions: 3
  - 1990, 2011, 2013

=== Cup ===
- DFB-Ligapokal: 2
  - Winners: 2001, 2002
  - Runners-up: 2000
- DFB-Pokal: 0
  - Runners-up: 1977, 1979, 1993^{1}

=== Regional ===
- Oberliga Berlin Champions:
  - 1925, 1926, 1927, 1928, 1929, 1930, 1931, 1933
- Gauliga Berlin-Brandenburg Champions:
  - 1935, 1937, 1944
- Brandenburg football champions:
  - 1906, 1915, 1917, 1918, 1925–31, 1933
- Berliner Landespokal (Tiers 3-7):
  - Winners: 1920, 1924, 1928, 1929, 1943, 1958, 1959, 1966, 1967, 1976^{1}, 1987, 1992^{1}, 2004^{1}

Note 1: Reserve Team

=== Youth ===
- German Under 19 Championship
  - Champions: 2018
  - Runners-up: 2022
- German Under 17 championship
  - Champions: 2000, 2003, 2005
  - Runners-up: 1991
- Under 19 Bundesliga North/Northeast
  - Champions: 2005, 2006
- Under 17 Bundesliga North/Northeast
  - Champions: 2008
