= 2001 DFB-Ligapokal final =

German League Cup
- Event: 2001 DFB-Ligapokal
Schalke 04	Hertha BSC
1	4
- Date: 21 July 2001
- Venue: Carl-Benz-Stadion, Mannheim
- Referee: Alfons Berg (Konz)
- Attendance: 10,000

The 2001 DFB-Ligapokal final decided the winner of the 2001 DFB-Ligapokal, the 5th edition of the reiterated DFB-Ligapokal, a knockout football cup competition.

The match was played on 21 July 2001 at the Carl-Benz-Stadion in Mannheim. Hertha BSC won the match 4–1 against Schalke 04 for their 1st title.

== Teams ==
Team	Qualification for tournament	Previous appearances (bold indicates winners)
Schalke 04	2000–01 DFB-Pokal winners and 2000–01 Bundesliga runners-up	None
Hertha BSC	2000–01 Bundesliga fifth place	1 (2000)

== Route to the final ==
The DFB-Ligapokal is a six team single-elimination knockout cup competition. There are a total of two rounds leading up to the final. Four teams enter the preliminary round, with the two winners advancing to the semi-finals, where they will be joined by two additional clubs who were given a bye. For all matches, the winner after 90 minutes advances. If still tied, extra time, and if necessary penalties are used to determine the winner.

Schalke 04		Round	Hertha BSC
Opponent	Result	2001 DFB-Ligapokal	Opponent	Result
Bye		Preliminary round	Bayer Leverkusen	2–1
Borussia Dortmund	2–1	Semi-finals	Bayern Munich	1–0

== Match ==
=== Details ===
21 July 2001
17:45 CEST

Schalke 04	1–4	Hertha BSC
Böhme 40'	Report	Wałdoch 24' (o.g.); Marcelinho 29'; Alex Alves 66'; Hartmann 84'

Carl-Benz-Stadion, Mannheim
Attendance: 10,000
Referee: Alfons Berg (Konz)

**Schalke 04**	**Hertha BSC**

GK	13	(Norway) Frode Grodås
CB	6	(Poland) Tomasz Hajto
CB	15	(Poland) Tomasz Wałdoch (c)
CB	2	(Belgium) Nico Van Kerckhoven
DM	12	(Netherlands) Marco van Hoogdalem
DM	20	(Czech Republic) Jiří Němec
RM	16	(Federal Republic of Yugoslavia) Kristijan Đorđević
LM	8	(Germany) Jörg Böhme
AM	7	(Germany) Andreas Möller	(substituted off) 57'
CF	14	(Germany) Gerald Asamoah	(substituted off) 57'
CF	11	(Denmark) Ebbe Sand	(substituted off) 70'
Substitutes:
GK	1	(Germany) Oliver Reck
DF	25	(Germany) Marcel Rozgonyi
MF	5	(Germany) Sven Kmetsch
MF	17	(Belgium) Sven Vermant	(substituted on) 57'
MF	19	(Germany) Mike Büskens
FW	21	(Belgium) Émile Mpenza	(substituted on) 57'
FW	22	(Nigeria) Victor Agali	(substituted on) 70'
Manager:
(Netherlands) Huub Stevens

GK	1	(Hungary) Gábor Király
CB	33	(Germany) Marko Rehmer
CB	5	(Greece) Kostas Konstantinidis
CB	14	(Croatia) Josip Šimunić
RM	21	(Germany) Michael Hartmann		(substituted off) 88'
CM	26	(Germany) Sebastian Deisler		(substituted off) 63'
DM	22	(Germany) Stefan Beinlich
CM	30	(Brazil) Marcelinho
LM	20	(Germany) Andreas Neuendorf
CF	7	(Brazil) Alex Alves	Booked	(substituted off) 82'
CF	11	(Germany) Michael Preetz (c)
Substitutes:
GK	12	(Germany) Christian Fiedler
DF	6	(Iceland) Eyjólfur Sverrisson
MF	8	(Belgium) Bart Goor		(substituted on) 82'
MF	18	(Hungary) Pál Dárdai		(substituted on) 63'
MF	23	(Germany) René Tretschok
MF	25	(Netherlands) Rob Maas
MF	32	(Germany) Thorben Marx		(substituted on) 88'
Manager:
(Germany) Jürgen Röber
