= 2002 DFB-Ligapokal =

- Tournament programme cover

Tournament details
- Country: Germany
- Teams: 6

Final positions
- Champions: Hertha BSC
- Runners-up: Schalke 04

Tournament statistics
- Matches played: 5
- Goals scored: 15 (3 per match)
- Top goal scorer(s): Marcelinho; Alex Alves (3 goals each)

The 2002 DFB-Ligapokal was the sixth edition of the DFB-Ligapokal. Hertha BSC won the competition for the second consecutive year, beating Schalke 04 4–1 in the final, an exact repeat of the previous year's competition, although Huub Stevens, the Hertha coach, had been in charge at Schalke the year prior.

== Participating clubs ==
A total of six teams qualified for the competition. The labels in the parentheses show how each team qualified for the place of its starting round:

- 1st, 2nd, 3rd, 4th, etc.: League position
- CW: Cup winners
- TH: Title holders

Semi-finals
Borussia Dortmund (1st)	Schalke 04 (CW + 5th)
Preliminary round
Bayer Leverkusen (2nd)	Hertha BSC^{TH} (4th)
Bayern Munich (3rd)	Werder Bremen (6th)

== Matches ==
=== Preliminary round ===
24 July 2002
20:30

Bayer Leverkusen	1–0	Werder Bremen
Sebescen 63'	Report

Lohmühle, Lübeck
Attendance: 7,250
Referee: Torsten Koop

25 July 2002
20:30

Bayern Munich	2–2	Hertha BSC
Élber 17', 88'	Report	Marcelinho 49'; Preetz 87'
Penalties
Salihamidžić (penalty scored); Scholl (penalty scored); Zickler (penalty scored); Sagnol (penalty missed); Tarnat (penalty missed); Élber (penalty missed)	3–4	(penalty scored) Konstantinidis; (penalty scored) Neuendorf; (penalty missed) Marcelinho; (penalty scored) Schmidt; (penalty missed) Preetz; (penalty scored) Pinto

Erzgebirgsstadion, Aue
Attendance: 13,400
Referee: Peter Gagelmann

=== Semi-finals ===
29 July 2002
20:30

Schalke 04	2–0	Bayer Leverkusen
Wałdoch 20'; Hajto 76' (pen.)	Report

Emslandstadion, Meppen
Attendance: 12,500
Referee: Uwe Kemmling

30 July 2002
20:30

Borussia Dortmund	1–2	Hertha BSC
Ricken 71' (pen.)	Report	Alves 25', 67'

Ernst-Abbe-Sportfeld, Jena
Attendance: 11,900
Referee: Florian Meyer

=== Final ===
1 August 2002
17:45 CEST

Schalke 04	1–4	Hertha BSC
Agali 61'	Report	Marcelinho 32', 84' (pen.); Alex Alves 33'; Pinto 89'

Ruhrstadion, Bochum
Attendance: 11,200
Referee: Hartmut Strampe (Handorf)

== See also ==
- 2002–03 Bundesliga
- 2002–03 DFB-Pokal
