= Bart Goor =

Belgian footballer

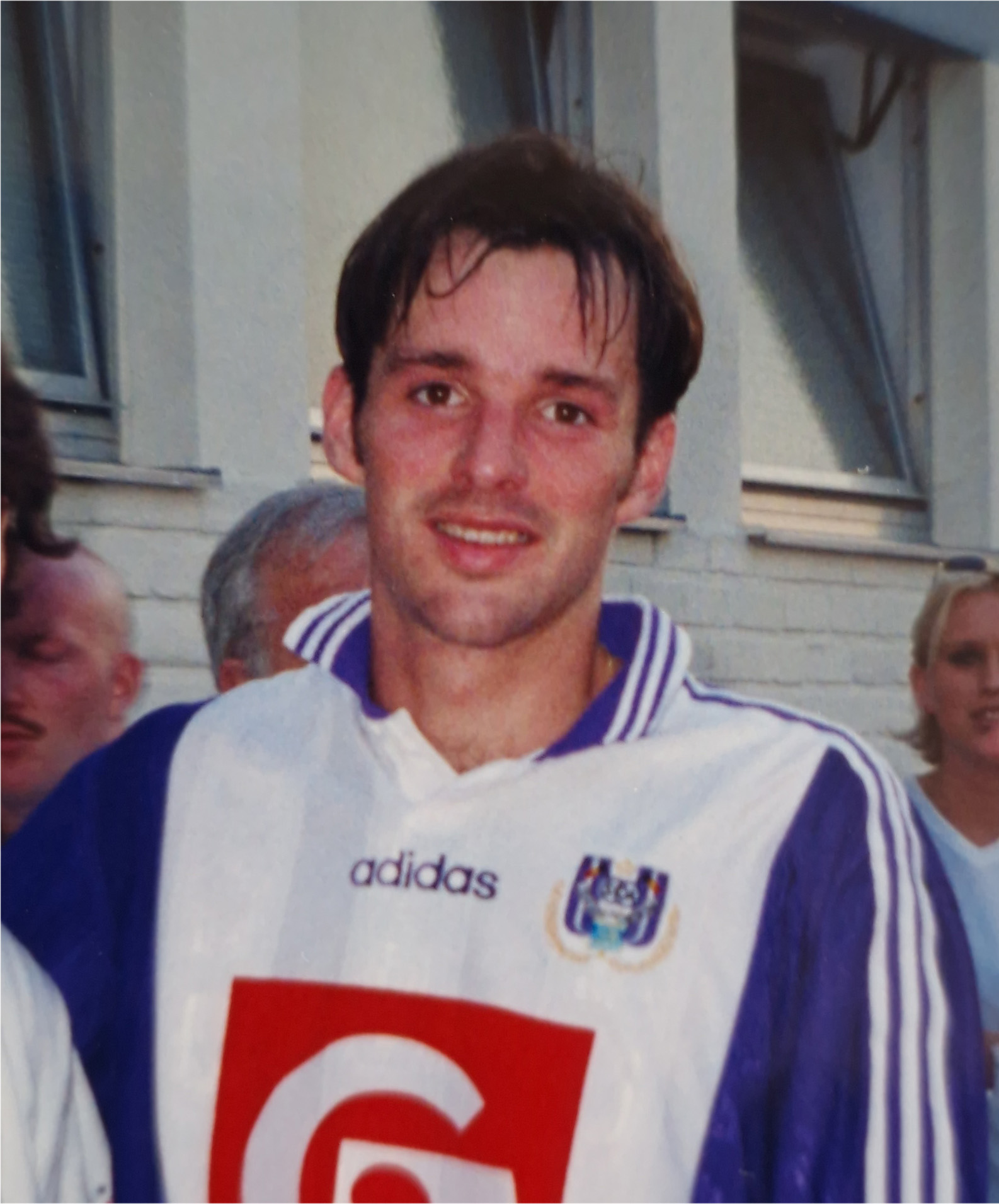
- Goor with Anderlecht in 1997

Personal information
- Date of birth: 9 April 1973 (age 53)
- Place of birth: Neerpelt, Belgium
- Height: 1.83 m (6 ft 0 in)
- Position: Left winger

Youth career
- 1981–1986: Buul
- 1986–1991: Verbroedering Geel

Senior career*
Years	Team	Apps	(Gls)
1991–1996	Verbroedering Geel	142	(27)
1996–1997	Genk	33	(18)
1997–2001	Anderlecht	131	(32)
2001–2004	Hertha BSC	87	(13)
2004–2005	Feyenoord	34	(7)
2005–2008	Anderlecht	97	(10)
2009–2011	Germinal Beerschot	61	(7)
2011–2013	Westerlo	50	(16)
2013–2014	Dessel Sport	31	(10)
Total		666	(140)

International career
1999–2008	Belgium	78	(13)

Managerial career
- 2021–2023: Westerlo (assistant)
- 2023: Westerlo (caretaker)
- 2023–2024: Westerlo (assistant)
- 2024: Westerlo (caretaker)
- * Club domestic league appearances and goals

Bart Goor (Dutch pronunciation: [bɑrt ˈxoːr]; (Note: In isolation, Goor is pronounced [ˈɣoːr].) born 9 April 1973) is a Belgian football manager and former professional international footballer who played as a left winger. Goor played for clubs including Anderlecht, Feyenoord, Genk, and Hertha Berlin. He enjoyed his most successful period at Anderlecht, with whom he became Belgian champion four times, among other achievements.

From 1999 to 2008, he also played for the Belgium national team. He played a total of 78 international matches, scoring thirteen times and wearing the captain's armband 12 times. With the Red Devils, he participated in Euro 2000 in the Netherlands and Belgium and the 2002 World Cup in Japan and South Korea.

== Club career ==
=== Geel ===
Goor began his professional career representing K.F.C. Verbroedering Geel in 1991 having risen through the club's youth ranks. He spent six years at the Antwerp-based club, playing 142 league games for and scoring 27 goals for the club playing from a midfield position.

=== Racing Genk ===
Eventually, Goor caught the eye of Racing Genk and transferred there for the 1996–97 season. His first and only season at the club proved very successful, especially in goal return, the midfielder successfully netting with an average for the club of just over a goal every two games.

=== Anderlecht ===
His season at Genk obviously caught the eye of the RSC Anderlecht hierarchy and Goor joined the Belgian giants, making his debut for his new side on 12 August 1997, in an eventual 2–0 victory over Ukrainian side Vorskla Poltava. A month later, on 16 September, Goor netted his first Anderlecht goal, scoring the second goal for R.S.C. in a 4–3 win over SV Austria Salzburg. In this first term with Anderlecht, Goor completed 32 Belgian First Division games, scoring 8 goals – a downturn from his tally the previous year at Genk but an impressive feat nonetheless for a midfielder.

Following this first season, Goor would go on to represent Anderlecht in all competitions, playing a regular role in the side's starting eleven. His most notable period in this first spell at Anderlecht was during the 2000–01 campaign, during which Anderlecht gained several high-profile victories over a host of big-name European clubs, such as Manchester United, Real Madrid and Lazio. In the 2–0 victory over Real, Goor got himself on the score-sheet.

=== Hertha BSC and Feyenoord ===
Goor's impressive and consistent form for Anderlecht was eventually rewarded by a transfer to Hertha BSC, where the Belgian would go on to spend three seasons. During this time he notched up a respectable number of performances for the German Bundesliga outfit, statistically improving his goal return in an average that saw 87 league appearances include a total of 13 goals.

He then transferred to Feyenoord, playing at the club as a regular in a time at the club that proved short-lived. After a falling-out with management staff, a decision was made for Goor to cut short his stay at the Eredivisie side.

=== Return to Anderlecht ===
A return to previous team Anderlecht proved the most tantalizing proposition for Goor following his Feyenoord troubles, and he signed back on for the side in the 2005–06 season. For a second time around Goor proved to be a hit for the Belgian side, featuring again as a regular in the squad and eventually becoming the club captain in 2006 following the retirement of Pär Zetterberg. He was captain of the Anderlecht side in the 2006–07 season. In the 2007–08 season, the captain's armband was handed over to the younger vice-captain Olivier Deschacht in times of Goor's absence through injury or national duty, with Deschacht ultimately becoming Anderlecht's official captain. He would go on to represent Anderlecht until midway through the 2008–09 campaign, having collected four Belgian First Division titles during his two stays at the Brussels club.

=== Post-Anderlecht ===
Having played his final game for Anderlecht on 18 December 2008, Goor completed a planned transfer to Germinal Beerschot in January 2009, where he played over two seasons. On 25 November 2011, news was released that Bart Goor and Beerschot had mutually agreed to terminate his contract, allowing Goor to sign for Westerlo who signed him to help avoid relegation. Westerlo was however unable to avoid relegation, but Goor remained with the team, completing the 2012–13 season in the Belgian Second Division. Goor then transferred to Dessel Sport in the same league, where he played the final season in his career.

== International career ==
=== Euro 2000 ===
Goor was part of the Belgium national football team at Euro 2000, which was co-hosted by Belgium and the Netherlands. Despite the team's victory in the opening game of tournament against Sweden, in which Goor scored the opening goal, the Belgians lost their second group match against Italy, and subsequently crashed out of the tournament in disappointing style in front of their own fans at the hands of Turkey in the first round.

== Career statistics ==
Appearances and goals by club, season and competition
Club	Season	League			National cup (Note: Includes Belgian Cup, KNVB Cup, FA Cup)		Europe		Other		Total	
Club	Season	Division	Apps	Goals	Apps	Goals	Apps	Goals	Apps	Goals	Apps	Goals
Geel	1991–92	Belgian Second Division	2	0	2	0	—		—		4	0
Geel	1992–93	Belgian Second Division	8	1	3	1	—		—		11	2
Geel	1993–94	Belgian Second Division	11	2	2	0	—		—		13	2
Geel	1994–95	Belgian Second Division	12	4	—		—		—		12	4
Geel	1995–96	Belgian Second Division	17	5	—		—		—		17	5
Geel	Total		50	12	7	1	—		—		57	13
Genk	1996–97	Belgian First Division	33	18	0	0	—		—		33	18
Anderlecht	1997–98	Belgian First Division	32	8	2	1	4 (Note: Appearances in UEFA Cup)	1	2 (Note: Appearances in UEFA Cup qualifying round)	0	40	10
Anderlecht	1998–99	Belgian First Division	34	7	1	0	2	0	4	0	41	7
Anderlecht	1999–2000	Belgian First Division	32	7	1	0	4	0	4 (Note: 2 appearances in UEFA Cup qualifying round, 2 in Belgian League Cup)	2	41	9
Anderlecht	2000–01	Belgian First Division	33	10	3	1	12 (Note: Appearances in UEFA Champions League)	1	5 (Note: 4 appearances in UEFA Champions League qualifying round, 1 in Belgian Super Cup)	0	53	12
Anderlecht	Total		131	32	7	2	22	2	15	2	175	38
Herta Berlin	2001–02	Bundesliga	30	8	3	1	4	0	3	0	40	9
Herta Berlin	2002–03	Bundesliga	33	5	1	0	7	0	3	0	44	5
Herta Berlin	2003–04	Bundesliga	24	0	3	0	2	0	1	0	30	0
Herta Berlin	Total		87	13	7	1	13	0	7	0	114	14
Feyenoord	2004–05	Eredivisie	34	7	2	0	7	3	—		43	10
Anderlecht	2005–06	Belgian First Division	32	4	1	0	6	0	4 (Note: Appearances in UEFA Champions League qualifying round)	2	43	6
Anderlecht	2006–07	Belgian First Division	26	4	4	0	6	0	1 (Note: Appearances in Belgian Super Cup)	0	37	4
Anderlecht	2007–08	Belgian First Division	30	1	5	1	8	1	3 (Note: 2 appearances in UEFA Champions League qualifying round, 1 in Belgian Super Cup)	0	46	3
Anderlecht	2008–09	Belgian First Division	13	1	—		0	0	3	0	3	0
Anderlecht	Total		101	10	10	1	20	1	11	2	142	14
Germinal Beerschot	2008–09	Belgian First Division	13	1	—		—		—		13	1
Germinal Beerschot	2009–10	Belgian First Division	20	5	2	0	0	0	— (Note: Appearances in Europa League playoff)		22	5
Germinal Beerschot	2010–11	Belgian First Division	25	1	3	1	—		3	0	31	2
Germinal Beerschot	2011–12	Belgian First Division	2	0	2	0	—		—		4	0
Germinal Beerschot	Total		60	7	7	1	0	0	3	0	70	8
Westerlo	2011–12	Belgian First Division	13	3	—		—		10 (Note: 6 appearances in Relegation playoff, 4 in Jupiler Pro League Playout)	3	23	6
Westerlo	2012–13	Belgian Second Division	33	11	3	3	—		3 (Note: Appearances in Relegation playoff)	0	39	14
Westerlo	Total		46	14	3	3	—		13	3	62	20
Dessel Sport	2013–14	Belgian Second Division	31	10	—		—		—		31	10
Career total			573	123	43	9	62	6	49	7	727	145

Appearances and goals by national team and year
National team	Year	Apps	Goals
Belgium	1999	3	0
Belgium	2000	2	0
Belgium	2001	5	0
Belgium	2002	11	3
Belgium	2003	5	3
Belgium	2004	10	0
Belgium	2005	5	1
Belgium	2006	8	3
Belgium	2007	5	0
Belgium	2008	12	4
Total		78	13

Scores and results list Belgium's goal tally first, score column indicates score after each Goor goal.

List of international goals scored by Bart Goor
No.	Date	Venue	Opponent	Score	Result	Competition
1	4 September 1999	Stadion Feijenoord, Rotterdam, Netherlands	Netherlands	3–3	5–5	Friendly
2	13 November 1999	Stadio Via del Mare, Lecce, Italy	Italy	3–1	2–1	Friendly
3	10 June 2000	King Baudouin Stadium, Brussels, Belgium	Sweden	1–0	2–1	Euro 2000
4	28 February 2001	King Baudouin Stadium, Brussels, Belgium	San Marino	3–0	10–1	2002 World Cup qualification
5	28 February 2001	King Baudouin Stadium, Brussels, Belgium	San Marino	5–0	10–1	2002 World Cup qualification
6	15 August 2001	Helsingfors Olympiastadion, Helsinki, Finland	Finland	1–3	1–4	Friendly
7	5 September 2001	King Baudouin Stadium, Brussels, Belgium	Scotland	2–0	2–0	2002 World Cup qualification
8	27 March 2002	Olympic Stadium, Athens, Greece	Greece	1–0	2–3	Friendly
9	17 April 2002	King Baudouin Stadium, Brussels, Belgium	Slovakia	1–0	1–1	Friendly
10	26 May 2002	KKWing Stadium, Kumamoto, Japan	Costa Rica	1–0	1–0	Friendly
11	11 June 2003	Cristal Arena, Genk, Belgium	Andorra	1–0	3–0	Euro 2004 qualification
12	11 June 2003	Cristal Arena, Genk, Belgium	Andorra	3–0	3–0	Euro 2004 qualification
13	29 May 2004	Philips Stadion, Eindhoven, Netherlands	Netherlands	1–0 ‡	1–0	Friendly

Key
‡	Indicates goal was scored from a penalty kick

== Honours ==
Anderlecht

- Belgian First Division: 1999–2000, 2000–01, 2005–06, 2006–07
- Belgian Cup: 2007–08
- Belgian Supercup: 2000, 2006, 2007
- Belgian League Cup: 2000
- Belgian Sports Team of the Year: 2000
- Jules Pappaert Cup: 2000, 2001

Hertha Berlin

- DFL-Ligapokal: 2001, 2002

Belgium

- FIFA Fair Play Trophy: 2002 World Cup

=== Individual ===
- Goal of the Season: 2009-2010
