= Kostas Konstantinidis =

German-born Greek footballer

Personal information
- Full name: Konstantinos Konstantinidis
- Date of birth: 31 August 1972 (age 54)
- Place of birth: Schorndorf, West Germany
- Height: 1.87 m (6 ft 2 in)
- Position: Defender

Youth career
- 1979–1983: VfL Schorndorf
- 1983–1985: VfB Stuttgart
- 1985–1991: Omonia Sindos Thessaloniki

Senior career*
Years	Team	Apps	(Gls)
1991–1994	Pierikos	84	(5)
1994–1997	OFI	65	(7)
1997–1999	Panathinaikos	60	(7)
1999–2002	Hertha BSC	48	(2)
2002	→ Bolton Wanderers (loan)	3	(0)
2002–2004	Hannover 96	43	(3)
2004–2005	1. FC Köln	14	(1)
2006–2007	OFI	35	(1)
2007–2008	Nea Salamis Famagusta	6	(0)
Total		358	(26)

International career
1995–2003	Greece	38	(1)

Managerial career
- 2009–2012: Skoda Xanthi (assistant)
- * Club domestic league appearances and goals

Kostas Konstantinidis (Greek: Κώστας Κωνσταντινίδης; born 31 August 1972) is a former professional footballer who works as technical director of Greece national team. A defender, he spent most of his career in Greece and Germany. Born in Germany, he represented Greece internationally.

== Career ==
Konstantinidis was born in Schorndorf, West Germany. As a youth he played for VfB Stuttgart before his family moved to Greece in 1985. Having established himself as a professional player with Pierikos, OFI and Hertha BSC he went on to play in Germany for Hertha BSC, Hannover 96 and 1. FC Köln.

In March 2002 he was loaned to English Premier League side Bolton Wanderers. He made three appearances for the club and was sent off in his second appearance against Everton.

== Coaching career ==
On 10 March 2009, it was announced by Greek Super League club Skoda Xanthi that Konstantinidis would be their next assistant coach, starting from 1 July.

As of 2011 he was still with Xanthi, as their head of scouting.

In August 2019 he was appointed technical director of Greece.

== Honours ==
Hertha Berlin

- DFL-Ligapokal: 2001, 2002
