= Andreas Neuendorf =

German footballer

Zecke Neuendorf
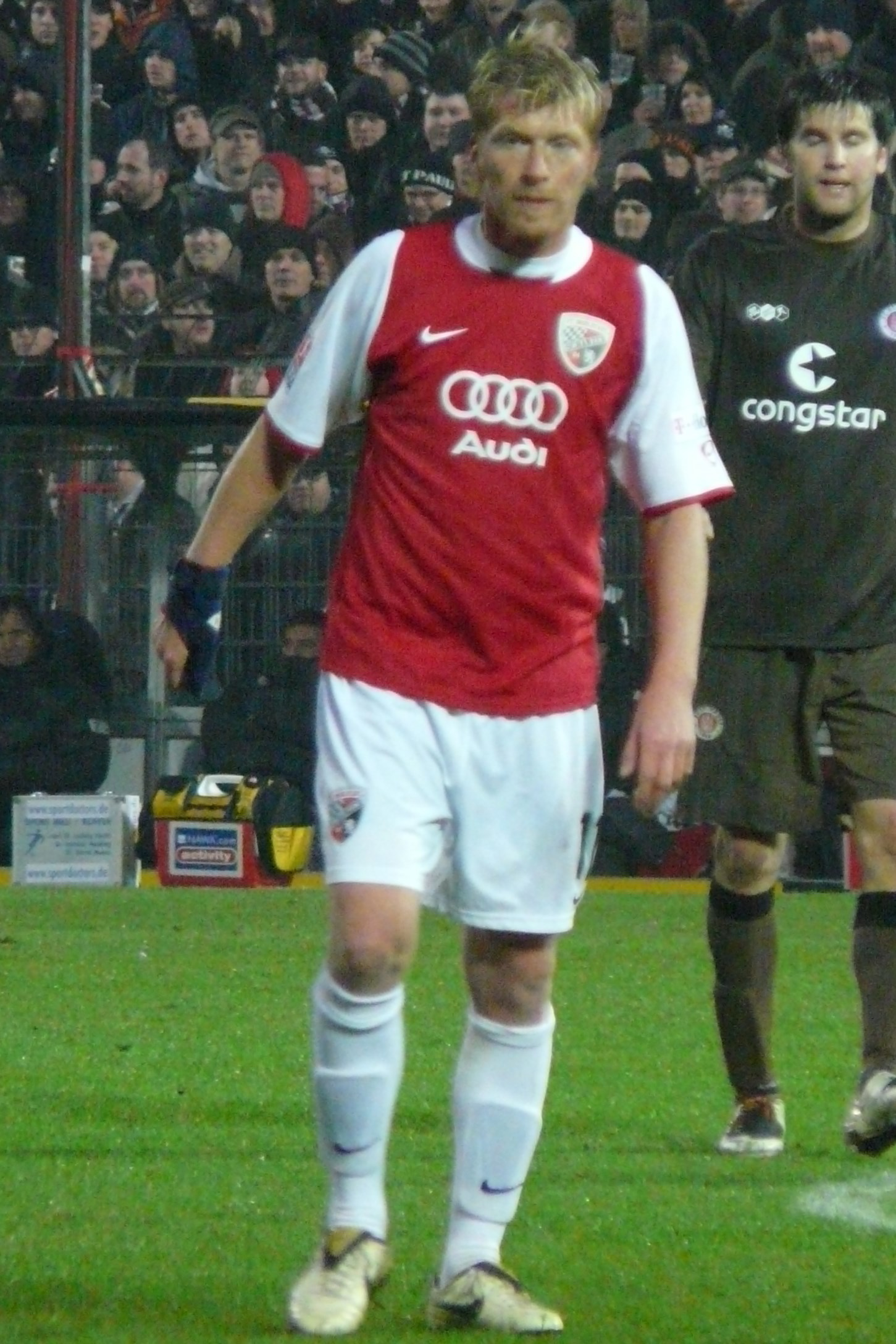
- Andreas Neuendorf as a football player for FC Ingolstadt

Personal information
- Full name: Andreas Neuendorf
- Date of birth: 9 February 1975 (age 51)
- Place of birth: West Berlin, West Germany
- Height: 1.78 m (5 ft 10 in)
- Position: Midfielder

Senior career*
Years	Team	Apps	(Gls)
1992–1994	Reinickendorfer Füchse	33	(2)
1994–1997	Bayer Leverkusen	44	(1)
1998–2000	Hertha BSC	30	(3)
2000–2001	Bayer Leverkusen	7	(0)
2001–2007	Hertha BSC	119	(12)
2007–2010	FC Ingolstadt 04	58	(3)
2010–2014	Hertha BSC II	73	(8)
2010	Hertha BSC	1	(0)
Total		365	(29)

International career
1994–1998	Germany U-21	23	(1)

Managerial career
- 2019–2021: Hertha BSC II
- 2021–: Hertha BSC (assistant)
- * Club domestic league appearances and goals

Andreas "Zecke" Neuendorf (born 9 February 1975) is a German former professional footballer who played as a midfielder.

== Career ==
Neuendorf has played for Bayer Leverkusen and Hertha BSC. He left Berlin after the 2006–07 season, having played with the club for six years. After three years with FC Ingolstadt 04, he returned to Hertha in 2010.

== Nickname ==
Neuendorf is nicknamed "Zecke" (German for tick), a name that was given to him by Leverkusen team-mate Ulf Kirsten after Neuendorf fell ill from a tick bite. He wears the name on his shirt, similar the common practice among Brazilian footballers, and it is listed in his passport as his stage name.

== Honours ==
Hertha Berlin

- DFL-Ligapokal: 2001, 2002
