= Alex Alves (footballer, born 1974) =

Brazilian footballer (1974–2012)

Personal information
- Full name: Alexandro Alves do Nascimento
- Date of birth: 30 December 1974
- Place of birth: Campo Formoso, Brazil
- Date of death: 14 November 2012 (aged 37)
- Place of death: Jaú, Brazil
- Height: 1.79 m (5 ft 10 in)
- Position: Striker

Senior career*
Years	Team	Apps	(Gls)
1993–1994	Vitória	31	(11)
1994–1995	Palmeiras	20	(2)
1996	Juventude (RS)		
1997	Portuguesa (SP)	43	(12)
1998–1999	Cruzeiro	42	(28)
1999–2003	Hertha BSC	81	(25)
2003	Atlético Mineiro	25	(8)
2004	Vasco da Gama	11	(3)
2005–2006	Vitória	14	(3)
2006	Shenyang Ginde	4	(0)
2007	Boavista (RJ)		
2008	Fortaleza		
2008	Boavista (RJ)		
2008–2009	Kavala	3	(1)
2010	União Rondonópolis		
Total		274	(92)
- * Club domestic league appearances and goals

Alexandro Alves do Nascimento (30 December 1974 – 14 November 2012) was a Brazilian professional footballer who played as a striker. He played in Brazil for Vitória, Palmeiras, Juventude (RS), Portuguesa (SP), Cruzeiro, Atlético Mineiro, Vasco da Gama, Boavista (RJ), Fortaleza, Chinese side Shenyang Ginde, in Germany for Hertha BSC, and in Greece for Kavala.

== Goal of the year ==
Alex Alves scored the Goal of the Year in Germany in 2000, scoring from inside the centre circle playing for Hertha BSC against 1. FC Köln. His goal reduced the deficit to 2–1, and Hertha won the match 4–2.

== Death ==
Alex Alves died on 14 November 2012 in Jaú, São Paulo, after facing a battle against the paroxysmal nocturnal hemoglobinuria.

== Honours ==
Hertha BSC

- DFL-Ligapokal: 2001, 2002
