= Rainer Widmayer =

German footballer (born 1967)

Personal information
- Date of birth: 2 April 1967 (age 59)
- Place of birth: Sindelfingen, West Germany
- Height: 1.83 m (6 ft 0 in)
- Position: Defender

Senior career*
Years	Team	Apps	(Gls)
–1993	1. FC Pforzheim		
1993–1994	TSF Ditzingen		
1994–1995	VfR Pforzheim		
1995–1997	SpVgg 07 Ludwigsburg	62	(6)
1997–1999	SSV Ulm	50	(1)

Managerial career
- 2001: VfB Stuttgart II (caretaker)
- 2011: Hertha BSC (caretaker)
- 2022: Greuther Fürth (caretaker)
- * Club domestic league appearances and goals

Rainer Widmayer (born 2 April 1967) is a German football manager and former player. During his playing career, he played mostly in the lower divisions, except his final season, during which he played in the 2. Bundesliga for SSV Ulm. As manager, he has been assistant manager of Swiss clubs FC St. Gallen and Grasshopper Club Zürich. In Germany, he assistant managed Hertha BSC and the reserves and professional squad of VfB Stuttgart. After Markus Babbel was sacked as manager of Hertha BSC, Widmayer was appointed caretaker of the Berlin club. Several days later, having completed his duties of caretaker, Widmayer left Hertha altogether. In 2012 Widmayer was assistant coach of Markus Babbel for TSG Hoffenheim. In January 2021, Widmayer became assistant coach of the new head coach of Schalke 04, Christian Gross. In 2022, he was assistant coach of Greuther Fürth and in October he was the interim manager for one game.
