= Jürgen Röber =

German footballer and manager

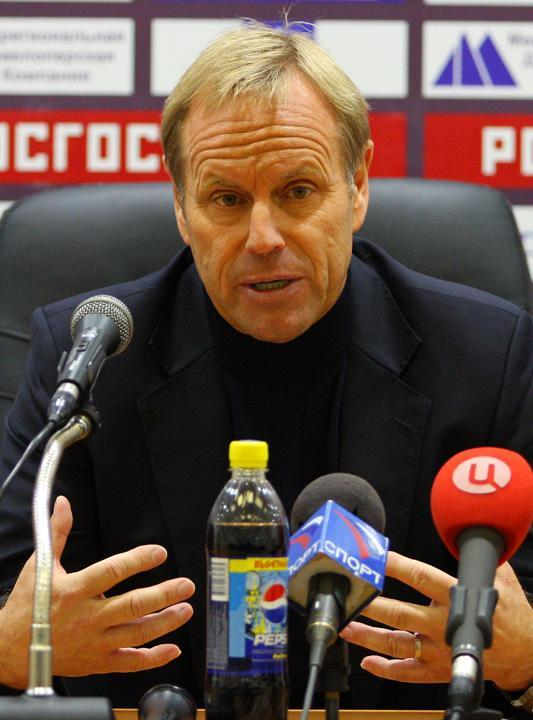
- Röber in 2010

Personal information
- Date of birth: 25 December 1953 (age 72)
- Place of birth: Gernrode, East Germany
- Height: 1.71 m (5 ft 7 in)
- Position: Midfielder

Youth career
- 1963–1967: SuS Bertlich
- 1967–1971: FC Zons

Senior career*
| Years | Team | Apps | (Gls) |
| 1971–1972 | CfB Ford-Niehl Köln | | |
| 1972–1974 | TuS Lingen | | |
| 1974–1980 | Werder Bremen | 184 | (57) |
| 1980–1981 | Bayern Munich | 14 | (0) |
| 1981 | Calgary Boomers | 30 | (6) |
| 1981–1982 | Nottingham Forest | 21 | (3) |
| 1982–1986 | Bayer Leverkusen | 105 | (18) |
| 1986–1991 | Rot-Weiss Essen | 104 | (17) |

Managerial career
- 1987–1991: Rot-Weiss Essen (assistant)
- 1991–1993: Rot-Weiss Essen
- 1993–1995: VfB Stuttgart
- 1996–2002: Hertha BSC
- 2003–2004: VfL Wolfsburg
- 2005–2006: Partizan
- 2006–2007: Borussia Dortmund
- 2008–2009: Saturn Ramenskoye
- 2009: Ankaraspor
- 2015–2017: Osmanlıspor (sporting director)
- 2017–2019: Mouscron (sporting director)
- * Club domestic league appearances and goals

Jürgen Röber (born 25 December 1953) is a German football manager and former player.

== Playing career ==
Röber's Bundesliga career lasted 12 years with a one year interruption, when he played in Canada and England. His greatest success as a player was winning the national German championship with Bayern Munich in 1981. He played as a midfielder.

== Coaching career ==
Röber started his manager career in 1991 at the club where he had ended his active career, Rot-Weiss Essen. His Bundesliga debut as manager was in 1994 with the VfB Stuttgart. His most successful time so far was as coach of Hertha BSC. In 1997, he led the team to promotion, only two years later Hertha finished at third position and made their entry into the Champions League.

After two more engagements at VfL Wolfsburg and Partizan he signed at Borussia Dortmund in December 2006. On 12 March 2007 he resigned, because he said he wasn't able "to reach the team".

Röber was with Saturn Ramenskoye from 21 August 2008 to 15 May 2009. Röber signed for Ankaraspor in summer 2009.

== Coaching record ==
As of 18 January 2014

| Team | From | To | Record | | | | | |
| Team | From | To | G | W | D | L | Win % | Ref. |
|---|---|---|---|---|---|---|---|---|
| Rot-Weiss Essen | 1 July 1991 | 14 December 1993 | — | | | | | |
| VfB Stuttgart | 15 December 1993 | 25 April 1995 | 44 | 18 | 13 | 13 | 40.91 | |
| Hertha BSC | 1 January 1996 | 6 February 2002 | 252 | 112 | 57 | 83 | 44.44 | |
| VfL Wolfsburg | 4 March 2003 | 3 April 2004 | 48 | 21 | 5 | 22 | 43.75 | |
| Partizan | 6 October 2005 | 10 May 2006 | 24 | 17 | 5 | 2 | 70.83 | |
| Borussia Dortmund | 19 December 2006 | 12 March 2007 | 8 | 2 | 0 | 6 | 25.00 | |
| Saturn Ramenskoye | 21 August 2008 | 15 May 2009 | 22 | 4 | 10 | 8 | 18.18 | |
| Ankaraspor | — | | | | | | | |
| Total | | | 398 | 174 | 90 | 134 | 43.72 | — |

== Honours ==
=== Player ===
Bayern Munich

- Bundesliga: 1980–81

=== Manager ===
Hertha BSC

- DFL-Ligapokal: 2001
