= Tomasz Wałdoch =

Polish footballer (born 1971)

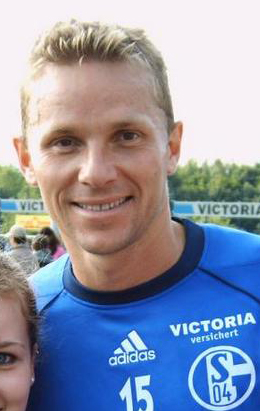
- Wałdoch with Schalke 04

Personal information
- Full name: Tomasz Wojciech Wałdoch
- Date of birth: 10 May 1971 (age 55)
- Place of birth: Gdańsk, Polish People's Republic
- Height: 1.87 m (6 ft 2 in)
- Position: Defender

Team information
- Current team: Schalke 04 II (assistant)

Youth career
- 1986–1988: Stoczniowiec Gdańsk

Senior career*
Years	Team	Apps	(Gls)
1988–1995	Górnik Zabrze	152	(8)
1995–1999	VfL Bochum	133	(8)
1999–2006	Schalke 04	141	(12)
2006–2007	Jagiellonia Białystok	5	(0)
Total		432	(29)

International career
- Poland Olympic
1991–2002	Poland	74	(2)

Managerial career
- 2006–2008: Schalke 04 U17 (assistant)
- 2008: Schalke 04 II (assistant)
- 2008–2009: Schalke 04 U17 (assistant)
- 2011–2012: Schalke 04 U17
- 2012–2014: Schalke 04 Jugend
- 2014–: Schalke 04 II (assistant)
Medal record
Representing Poland
Men's football
Olympic Games
Silver medal – second place	1992 Barcelona	Team
- * Club domestic league appearances and goals

Tomasz Wojciech Wałdoch (Polish pronunciation: [ˈtɔmaʐ ˈvawdɔx]; born 10 May 1971) is a Polish former professional footballer who played as a defender in Poland and Germany.

Wałdoch had a ten-year international career with Poland. He often captained the side, including at the 2002 World Cup. Most of his club career was spent in German leagues with VfL Bochum and Schalke 04.

== Club career ==
Wałdoch played for Górnik Zabrze, VfL Bochum, Schalke 04 and Jagiellonia Białystok.

== International career ==
Wałdoch played for the Poland national team, for a total of 74 caps. He was a participant at the 1992 Summer Olympics, where Poland won the silver medal. He was the captain of the Polish team for the 2002 World Cup.

== Coaching career ==
On 1 July 2006, Wałdoch was named as the assistant coach of the FC Schalke 04 U17 team. From 15 April 2008 until 30 June 2008, he was the assistant coach at Schalke 04 II. On 11 November 2009, it was announced that he would become the temporary assistant coach of Poland national team, assisting Franciszek Smuda. He was later replaced in the role by his former teammate Jacek Zielinski. On 20 April 2010, he was named the new sporting director of his first professional club Górnik Zabrze. He left later that year, in November. He went on to be coach of the Schalke 04 U17 team from July 2011 to June 2012. From July 2012 to June 2014, he was the coach of the Schalke 04 Jugend team. Currently, he is the assistant coach of the Schalke 04 II team for the second time, serving under Jürgen Luginger.

== Personal life ==
Wałdoch holds German citizenship. He is married with four children – two sons and two daughters. His son Kamil (born 4 July 1992) currently plays in the German fourth-tier for club FC Kray, situated in Essen.

== Career statistics ==
=== International ===
Appearances and goals by national team and year
National team	Year	Apps	Goals
Poland	1991	2	0
Poland	1992	6	1
Poland	1993	9	0
Poland	1994	6	0
Poland	1995	9	1
Poland	1996	3	0
Poland	1997	6	0
Poland	1998	5	0
Poland	1999	8	0
Poland	2000	9	0
Poland	2001	5	0
Poland	2002	6	0
Total		74	2

Scores and results list Poland's goal tally first, score column indicates score after each Wałdoch goal.

List of international goals scored by Tomasz Wałdoch
No.	Date	Venue	Opponent	Score	Result	Competition
1	23 September 1992	Stadion Miejski, Poznań, Poland	Turkey	1–0	1–0	1994 FIFA World Cup qualification
2	15 March 1995	Miejski Stadion Sportowy "KSZO", Ostrowiec Świętokrzyski, Poland	Lithuania	2–0	4–1	Friendly

== Honours ==
VfL Bochum

- 2. Bundesliga: 1995–96

Schalke 04

- Bundesliga: runner-up 2000–01
- DFB-Pokal: 2000–01, 2001–02
- DFB-Ligapokal: 2005; runner-up 2001, 2002
- UEFA Intertoto Cup: 2003, 2004

Poland Olympic

- Olympic silver medal: 1992
