= Pál Dárdai =

Hungarian footballer and manager (born 1976)

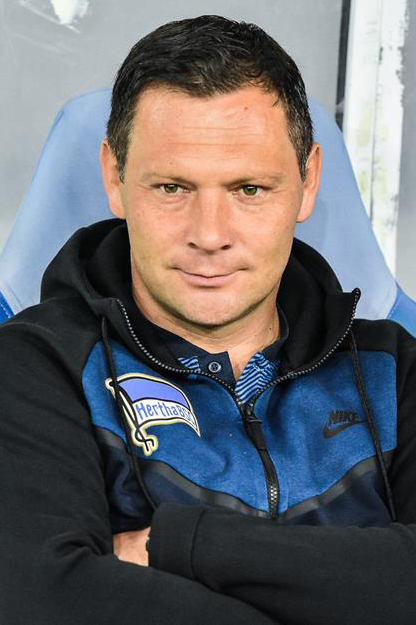
- Dárdai as a Hertha BSC coach in 2017

Personal information
- Date of birth: 16 March 1976 (age 50)
- Place of birth: Pécs, Hungary
- Height: 1.79 m (5 ft 10 in)
- Position: Defensive midfielder

Youth career
- Pécs

Senior career*
Years	Team	Apps	(Gls)
1991–1995	Pécs	68	(11)
1996	Budapesti VSC	22	(3)
1997–2011	Hertha BSC	297	(17)
Total		387	(31)

International career
1996–1997	Hungary U21	5	(1)
1998–2010	Hungary	61	(5)

Managerial career
- 2014–2015: Hungary
- 2015–2019: Hertha BSC
- 2021: Hertha BSC
- 2023–2024: Hertha BSC
- * Club domestic league appearances and goals

Pál Dárdai (born 16 March 1976) is a Hungarian former footballer who played mainly as a defensive midfielder. He was most recently the head coach of 2. Bundesliga club Hertha BSC.

In a 20-year professional career, he played for over a decade with the same club, Hertha BSC, in Germany. With 286 Bundesliga appearances, he is the club's most capped player. Dárdai gained 61 caps for the Hungary national team in 12 years, scoring five goals. He also worked as the country's manager.

== Club career ==
=== Hungary ===
Born in Pécs, Dárdai began his professional career with local Pécsi Mecsek FC, moving in January 1996 to Budapesti VSC. He helped his new club finish second in both the league and cup.

=== Hertha BSC ===
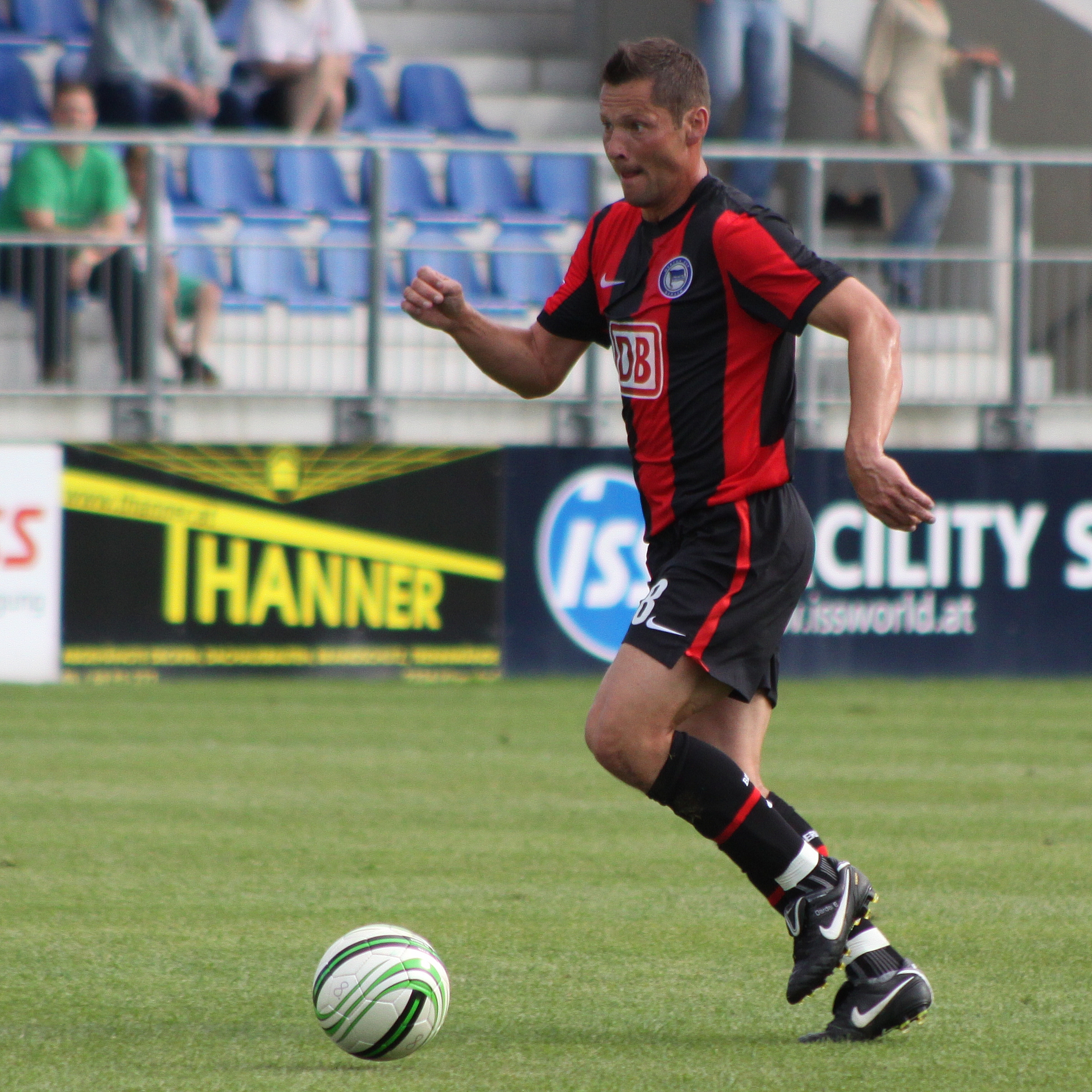
Dárdai playing for Hertha in 2009

In January 1997, Dárdai signed with Germany's Hertha BSC, appearing in ten matches for the 2. Bundesliga side before the end of the season, as the club was promoted to the top-flight Bundesliga. In 1998–99, he made 21 appearances (6 as a starter) as Hertha finished in third place, behind second-placed Bayer Leverkusen by one point.

On 13 November 2008, Dárdai marked his 250th Bundesliga appearance during the 1–0 win against 1899 Hoffenheim. Following the match, he thanked "the team and the fans".

On 16 January 2009, Dárdai damaged his meniscus during training. He was operated on by Gert Schleicher after returning to Berlin from Marbella in Spain, where Hertha spent their winter training camp.

Hertha extended Dárdai's contract by one year on 28 May 2009, and he became the club's longest-serving player.

He expressed his wish to further extend his link, stating, "I can imagine that I will end my career here in Berlin, but before I return to Hungary I want to fulfil my ambition and that is to win the championship and the cup." Dieter Hoeneß responded by saying the club would also like to keep him.

Dárdai helped Die Alte Dame qualify several times for the UEFA Cup, appearing sparingly from 2004 to 2006 (33 total matches) but featuring heavily in the following years. From 2009, his appearances became less and less frequent: after only one match in the 2010–11 campaign – with eventually returning to the top level – and being demoted to the reserve team, the 35-year-old retired from football, having appeared in 297 league contests.

== International career ==
Dárdai began playing for Hungary with the under-21s, in 1996. He made his senior debut in a friendly against Slovenia on 19 August 1998, and scored his first international goal on 10 October in an UEFA Euro 2000 qualifier against Azerbaijan, in the 58th minute of a 4–0 triumph.

Often cast as starting central midfielder alongside Krisztián Lisztes, under managers Bertalan Bicskei and Imre Gellei, Dárdai captained the national side seven times in 2006, netting twice. On 15 November 2006, he was not included in Péter Várhidi's provisional 25-man squad for the Euro 2008 qualifying phase, but featured in the 2010 FIFA World Cup qualifying campaign as Hungary was now managed by Erwin Koeman.

== Managerial career ==
=== 2012–2015: Hertha BSC ===
In 2012, Dárdai began working as a coach at Hertha BSC, his assistants at the under-15 team being Admir Hamžagić and Jochem Ziegert.

=== 2014–15: Hungary ===
On 18 September 2014, Dárdai was appointed as interim manager of the Hungary national team. He turned down an offer from the Hungarian Football Federation ("MLSZ") to manage the side on a permanent basis, with the former's president Sándor Csányi confirming the latter would be in charge of three Euro 2016 qualifying matches for free.

On 23 September 2014, Zsolt Lőw, assistant coach of Red Bull Salzburg, was not permitted by his club to join Dárdai's coaching staff in the same capacity. The latter's debut took place on 11 October against Romania, a 1–1 draw in Bucharest. Three days later, he managed his first win, prevailing 1–0 away against the Faroe Islands; he said after the second match that "the minimum aims were to get the three points".

Former international István Sallói said in an interview with Nemzeti Sport in October 2014 that, "Dárdai is the only chance for Hungarian football." The former was appointed by the latter as the aid to map the opponents of the national team, and also said, "In the last ten days it became incredible clear what type of work I have to do."

On 14 November 2014, Hungary won their first home match under Dárdai by beating Finland 1–0 thanks to Zoltán Gera's 84th-minute goal in the Euro 2016 qualifier at the Groupama Arena in Budapest. The following month, the MLSZ announced Dárdai would remain as manager until 30 November 2015, and he admitted that his son influenced him in making the decision by saying, "You have to return because without you they are not going to win."

After returning to Hertha BSC, Dárdai was replaced as Hungary manager by his former mentor, Bernd Storck.

In November 2015, Hungary under Storck qualified for the UEFA European Championship after a 44-year absence, and Dárdai stated in an interview with Hertha's official website that he built the base of the team while his successor added his part to reach the finals.

=== 2015–2019 and 2021: Return to Hertha ===
On 5 February 2015, he was appointed interim manager of the main squad. His first match in charge was a 2–0 victory over Mainz 05 two days later.

On 29 May 2015, Dárdai signed a permanent contract with Hertha.

Hertha began the season by getting eliminated from the UEFA Europa League in the third qualifying round by Brøndby.

Hertha won the first leg 1–0 and lost the second leg 3–1.

On 16 April during the 2018–19 Bundesliga season, it was announced Dárdai would be leaving his role at the end of the season and would return to a youth coach role in 2020.

After returning to the youth section, the senior team slumped under Bruno Labbadia, he once again took over the head coach duty on 25 January 2021 after Labbadia was sacked. He was sacked on 29 November 2021. He returned to manage Hertha in April 2023. After the 2023–24 season, the contract was not extended.

=== Újpest ===
On 18 December 2025, he was appointed as the sports director of Újpest FC.

== Personal life ==
Dárdai is married and has three sons: Palkó, Márton and Bence. On 29 July 2023, Pál Dárdai played all three of his sons together at the same time for the first time in Hertha's Bundesliga 2 opener against Fortuna Düsseldorf.

On 20 July 2002, Balázs Dárdai, his brother and a midfielder for FC Barcs, died during a tournament after an artery burst when he jumped for a ball. His father, also named Pál (1951–2017) and the club's coach, was watching the game when it happened; Balázs was only 23 years old.

== Career statistics ==
=== Club ===
Appearances and goals by club, season and competition
Club	Season	League		
Club	Season	Division	Apps	Goals
Pécsi MSC	1991–92	Nemzeti Bajnokság I	4	0
Pécsi MSC	1992–93	Nemzeti Bajnokság I	10	1
Pécsi MSC	1993–94	Nemzeti Bajnokság I	10	1
Pécsi MSC	1994–95	Nemzeti Bajnokság I	30	4
Pécsi MSC	1995–96	Nemzeti Bajnokság I	14	5
BVSC Budapest	1995–96	Nemzeti Bajnokság I	7	0
BVSC Budapest	1996–97	Nemzeti Bajnokság I	15	3
Hertha BSC	1996–97	2. Bundesliga	10	0
Hertha BSC	1997–98	Bundesliga	14	0
Hertha BSC	1998–99	Bundesliga	21	1
Hertha BSC	1999–00	Bundesliga	15	1
Hertha BSC	2000–01	Bundesliga	24	2
Hertha BSC	2001–02	Bundesliga	27	3
Hertha BSC	2002–03	Bundesliga	29	4
Hertha BSC	2003–04	Bundesliga	29	0
Hertha BSC	2004–05	Bundesliga	17	0
Hertha BSC	2005–06	Bundesliga	16	2
Hertha BSC	2006–07	Bundesliga	28	3
Hertha BSC	2007–08	Bundesliga	23	0
Hertha BSC	2008–09	Bundesliga	26	1
Hertha BSC	2009–10	Bundesliga	17	0
Hertha BSC	2010–11	2. Bundesliga	1	0
Career total			387	31

=== International ===
Scores and results list Hungary's goal tally first, score column indicates score after each Dárdai goal.

List of international goals scored by Pál Dárdai
No.	Date	Venue	Cap	Opponent	Score	Result	Competition
1	10 October 1998	Tofiq Bahramov, Baku, Azerbaijan	3	Azerbaijan	1–0	4–0	Euro 2000 qualifying
2	7 September 2002	Laugardalsvöllur, Reykjavík, Iceland	28	Iceland	2–0	2–0	Friendly
3	20 November 2002	Üllői úti, Budapest, Hungary	31	Moldova	1–1	1–1	Friendly
4	30 May 2006	Old Trafford, Manchester, England	44	England	1–2	1–3	Friendly
5	6 September 2006	Bilino Polje, Zenica, Bosnia and Herzegovina	47	Bosnia and Herzegovina	3–0	3–1	Euro 2008 qualifying

== Managerial statistics ==
As of 19 May 2024

Team	From	To	Record								
Team	From	To	P	W	D	L	GF	GA	GD	Win %	Ref
Hungary	18 September 2014	20 July 2015	7	4	2	1	9	3	+6	57.14	
Hertha BSC	5 February 2015	30 June 2019	172	64	44	64	219	231	−12	37.21	
Hertha BSC	25 January 2021	29 November 2021	32	10	9	13	34	48	−14	31.25	
Hertha BSC	16 April 2023	present	44	17	11	16	90	71	+19	38.64	
Total			255	95	66	94	352	361	−9	37.25	

== Honours ==
Budapesti VSC

- Hungarian Cup runner-up: 1995–96

Hertha BSC

- 2. Bundesliga: 2010–11
- DFB-Ligapokal: 2001, 2002; runner-up: 2000
- UEFA Intertoto Cup: 2006

Individual

- Hungarian Footballer of the Year: 2006
