= 2001 DFB-Ligapokal =

- Tournament programme cover

Tournament details
- Country: Germany
- Teams: 6

Final positions
- Champions: Hertha BSC
- Runners-up: Schalke 04

Tournament statistics
- Matches played: 5
- Goals scored: 14 (2.8 per match)
- Top goal scorer(s): Victor Agali; Marcelinho (2)

The 2001 DFB-Ligapokal was the fifth edition of the DFB-Ligapokal. Hertha BSC won the competition, beating Schalke 04 4–1 in the final. Hertha had ended Bayern Munich's dominance of the competition by beating them in the semi-finals.

== Participating clubs ==
A total of six teams qualified for the competition. The labels in the parentheses show how each team qualified for the place of its starting round:

- 1st, 2nd, 3rd, 4th, etc.: League position
- CW: Cup winners
- TH: Title holders

Semi-finals
Bayern Munich^{TH} (1st)	Schalke 04 (CW + 2nd)
Preliminary round
Borussia Dortmund (3rd)	Hertha BSC (5th)
Bayer Leverkusen (4th)	SC Freiburg (6th)

== Matches ==
=== Preliminary round ===
11 July 2001
20:30

Borussia Dortmund	1–1	SC Freiburg
Kohler 61'	Report	Müller 47'
Penalties
Rosický (penalty scored); Evanílson (penalty missed); Dedé (penalty scored); Koller (penalty scored)	3–1	(penalty scored) Tskitishvili; (penalty missed) Iashvili; (penalty missed) Kobiashvili; (penalty missed) Zeyer

Dietmar-Hopp-Stadion, Hoffenheim
Attendance: 6,500
Referee: Lutz Wagner

12 July 2001
20:30

Bayer Leverkusen	1–2	Hertha BSC
Neuville 44'	Report	Marcelinho 49'; Deisler 63'

Paul Greifzu Stadium, Dessau
Attendance: 14,400
Referee: Michael Weiner

=== Semi-finals ===
17 July 2001
20:30

Schalke 04	2–1	Borussia Dortmund
Agali 2', 12'	Report	Bobic 75'

Nattenberg Stadion, Lüdenscheid
Attendance: 15,300
Referee: Christian Wack

18 July 2001
20:30

Bayern Munich	0–1	Hertha BSC
	Report	Preetz 39'

Rosenaustadion, Augsburg
Attendance: 15,000
Referee: Jürgen Jansen

=== Final ===
21 July 2001
17:45 CEST

Schalke 04	1–4	Hertha BSC
Böhme 40'	Report	Wałdoch 24' (o.g.); Marcelinho 29'; Alex Alves 66'; Hartmann 84'

Carl-Benz-Stadion, Mannheim
Attendance: 10,000
Referee: Alfons Berg (Konz)

== See also ==
- 2001–02 Bundesliga
- 2001–02 DFB-Pokal
