= Huub Stevens =

Dutch footballer and manager

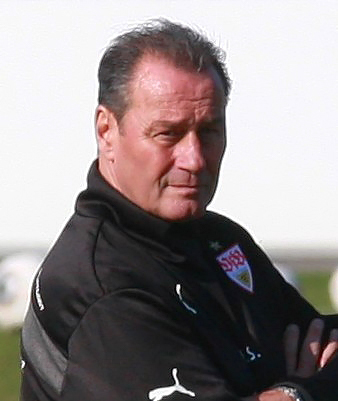
- Stevens as manager of VfB Stuttgart in 2014

Personal information
- Full name: Hubertus Jozef Margaretha Stevens
- Date of birth: 29 November 1953 (age 72)
- Place of birth: Sittard, Netherlands
- Height: 1.81 m (5 ft 11 in)
- Position: Defender

Senior career*
Years	Team	Apps	(Gls)
1970–1975	Fortuna Sittard	104	(4)
1975–1986	PSV	293	(15)
Total		397	(19)

International career
1979–1985	Netherlands	18	(1)

Managerial career
- 1986–1993: PSV (youth)
- 1993–1996: Roda JC
- 1996–2002: Schalke 04
- 2002–2003: Hertha BSC
- 2004–2005: 1. FC Köln
- 2005–2007: Roda JC
- 2007–2008: Hamburger SV
- 2008–2009: PSV
- 2009–2011: Red Bull Salzburg
- 2011–2012: Schalke 04
- 2013–2014: PAOK
- 2014: VfB Stuttgart
- 2014–2015: VfB Stuttgart
- 2015–2016: TSG Hoffenheim
- 2019: Schalke 04 (interim)
- 2020: Schalke 04 (interim)
- * Club domestic league appearances and goals

Hubertus Jozef Margaretha "Huub" Stevens (Dutch pronunciation: [ɦyp ˈsteːvəns]; born 29 November 1953) is a Dutch former professional football manager and player.

== Playing career ==
Stevens was born in Sittard. While active, he played for Fortuna Sittard and PSV. During his time at PSV, he won the Eredivisie three times, the KNVB Cup once and also won the UEFA Cup once, in 1978. He also earned 18 caps for the Netherlands national team, scoring one goal and appearing in the 1980 European Championship finals.

== Managerial career ==
Soon after beginning his career as head of youth development at PSV, where he helped bring and develop players and managers such as Nick Theslof, in 1993, Stevens became the manager of Roda JC. From October 1996 to June 2002, he managed German Bundesliga side Schalke 04, with whom he won the UEFA Cup in 1997 and the DFB-Pokal in 2001 and 2002. In 1999, Schalke fans picked Stevens as manager of the century.

Afterwards, Stevens was appointed manager of Hertha BSC, but he was sacked on 4 December 2003. He was then hired by 1. FC Köln, which he managed from 14 June 2004 to 27 May 2005, when he signed a two-year contract with Roda JC. Under Stevens, Köln became champions of the 2. Bundesliga and were promoted to the Bundesliga. Stevens was at Roda until he returned to the German Bundesliga, becoming the new manager of Hamburger SV on 2 February 2007. By the time Stevens took over, the club was in the relegation zone. Results improved quite dramatically and led to Hamburg avoiding relegation and even finishing seventh in the league, thereby qualifying for the 2007 UEFA Intertoto Cup.

Stevens took over the managing vacancy at PSV after his Hamburg contract expired at the end of the 2007–08 season. It was reported he signed a two-year contract with the Eindhoven club, a club he holds very dearly to his heart. However, on 28 January 2009, he resigned as manager, after which he signed a contract with Red Bull Salzburg in the Austrian Bundesliga on 22 April 2009.

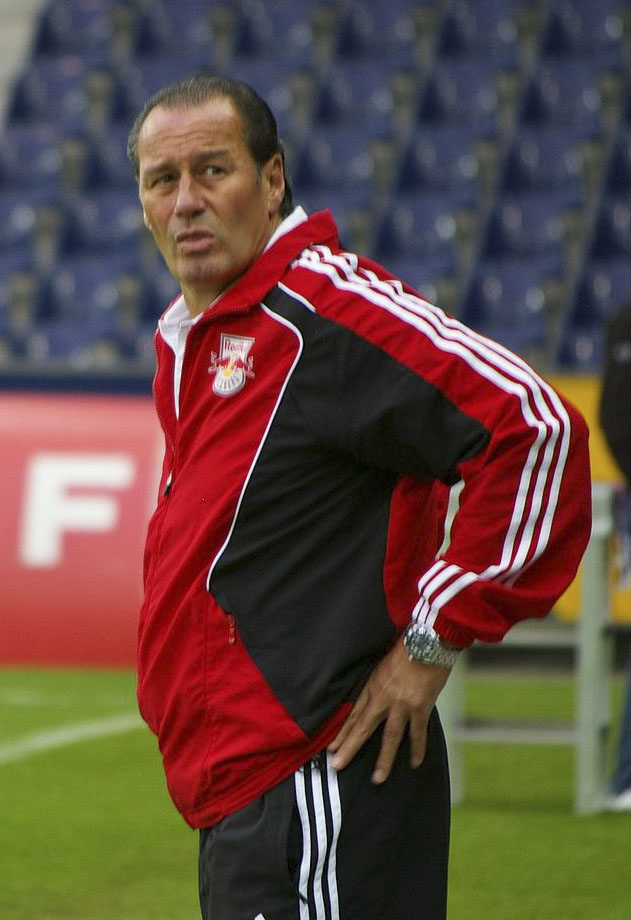
Stevens with Salzburg

On 9 February 2010, Stevens extended his contract with Red Bull Salzburg until 2012, but he was sacked on 8 April 2011. On 27 September 2011, he returned to Schalke 04 and signed a contract lasting until 2013, following Ralf Rangnick's resignation. On 16 December 2012, Stevens was sacked by Schalke.

On 25 June 2013, Stevens became manager of Super League Greece side PAOK. PAOK terminated his contract on 2 March 2014 due to the club's poor results.

After his departure, Stevens was appointed manager of VfB Stuttgart on 9 March 2014, replacing Thomas Schneider. Stevens started his new position with training on 10 March 2014. His first match in charge was against Werder Bremen, a 1–1 draw. He resigned as manager of Stuttgart on 10 May 2014 following a 1–0 loss to Bayern Munich. He finished his stint with a record of three wins, three draws and four losses in ten matches.

On 25 November 2014, Stevens returned to VfB Stuttgart. His first match in his return to the club was a 4–1 win against SC Freiburg on 28 November 2014. On 21 March 2015, in a 3–1 win against Eintracht Frankfurt, Stuttgart won its first match of 2015 and its second home win of the 2014–15 season. He left Stuttgart at the end of the 2014–15 season, where Stuttgart finished in the 14th position in the Bundesliga.

Stevens was appointed manager of TSG Hoffenheim on 26 October 2015 after the club started the season with just six points in ten matches. He resigned on 10 February 2016, citing health problems.

On 14 March 2019, he returned to Schalke as an interim until the end of the season after Domenico Tedesco was sacked by the club.

On 18 December 2020, he returned to Schalke once again as an interim. This time he coached the club for only two matches. Schalke could not end a winless streak of 28 games in the Bundesliga in his first match, losing 0–1 to Arminia Bielefeld, but won the next match 3–1 against SSV Ulm in the DFB-Pokal.

== Career statistics ==
=== International ===
Appearances and goals by national team and year
National team	Year	Apps	Goals
Netherlands	1979	8	1
Netherlands	1980	4	0
Netherlands	1981	3	0
Netherlands	1982	2	0
Netherlands	1983	0	0
Netherlands	1984	0	0
Netherlands	1985	1	0
Total		18	1

Scores and results list the Netherlands' goal tally first, score column indicates score after each Stevens goal.

List of international goals scored by Huub Stevens
No.	Date	Venue	Opponent	Score	Result	Competition
1	17 October 1979	Olympisch Stadion, Amsterdam, Netherlands	Poland	1–1	1–1	UEFA Euro 1980 qualification

== Managerial statistics ==
As of 22 December 2020

Team	From	To	Record					
Team	From	To	G	W	D	L	Win %	Ref.
Roda JC	1 March 1993	8 October 1996	139	66	41	32	47.48	
Schalke 04	8 October 1996	30 June 2002	242	105	65	72	43.39	
Hertha BSC	1 July 2002	4 December 2003	64	25	17	22	39.06	
1. FC Köln	14 June 2004	27 May 2005	36	21	8	7	58.33	
Roda JC	27 May 2005	2 February 2007	69	32	13	24	46.38	
Hamburger SV	2 February 2007	30 June 2008	67	35	19	13	52.24	
PSV	1 July 2008	28 January 2009	28	12	5	11	42.86	
Red Bull Salzburg	15 June 2009	8 April 2011	94	46	28	20	48.94	
Schalke 04	27 September 2011	16 December 2012	63	34	14	15	53.97	
PAOK	25 June 2013	2 March 2014	44	25	9	10	56.82	
VfB Stuttgart	10 March 2014	10 May 2014	10	3	3	4	30.00	
VfB Stuttgart	25 November 2014	24 May 2015	22	7	6	9	31.82	
TSG Hoffenheim	26 October 2015	10 February 2016	10	1	5	4	10.00	
Schalke 04	14 March 2019	30 June 2019	10	2	4	4	20.00	
Schalke 04	18 December 2020	22 December 2020	2	1	0	1	50.00	
Total			900	415	237	248	46.11	

== Honours ==
=== Player ===
PSV

- Eredivisie: 1975–76, 1977–78, 1985–86
- KNVB Cup: 1975–76
- UEFA Cup: 1977–78

=== Manager ===
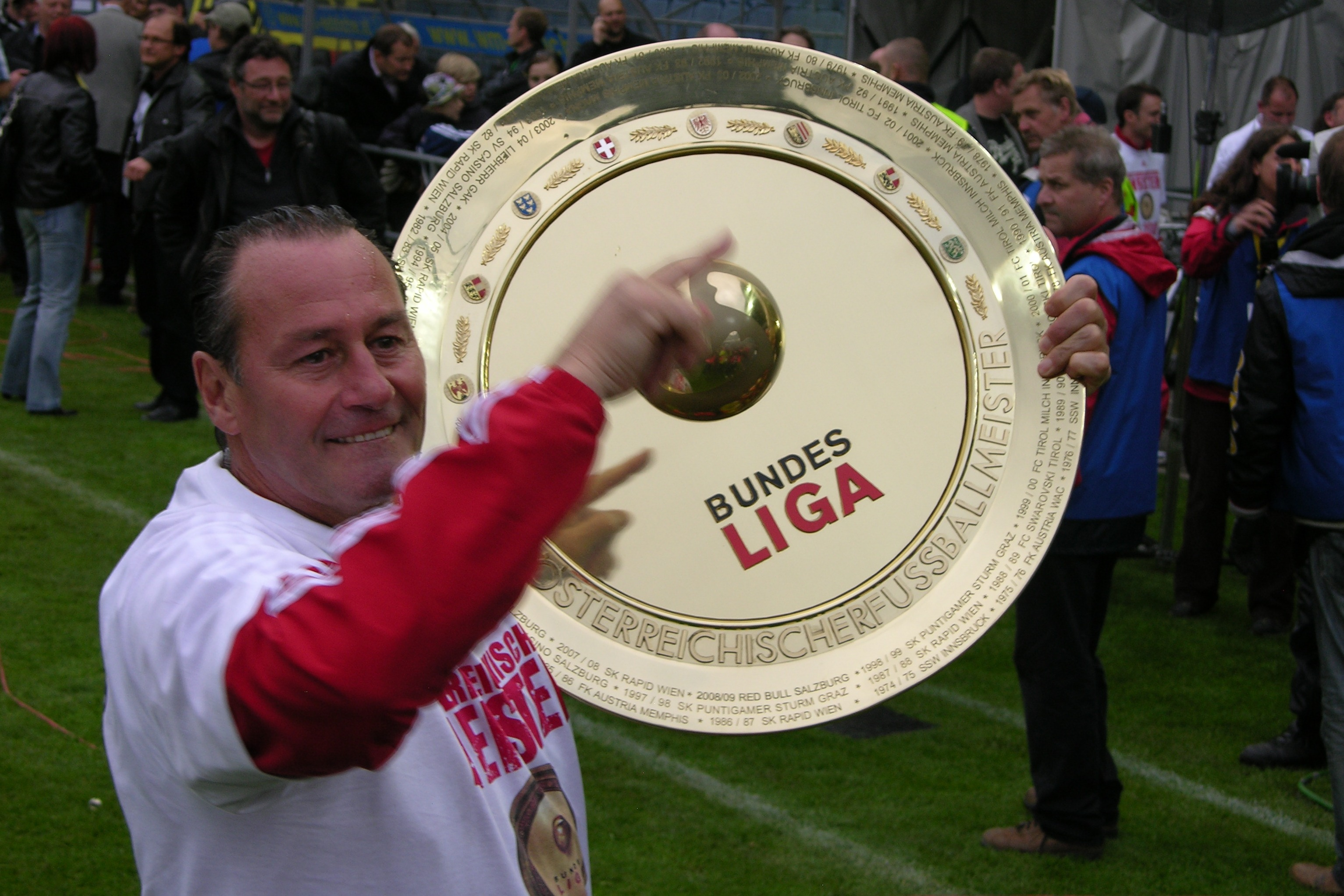
Stevens celebrates winning the 2009–10 Austrian Bundesliga with Red Bull Salzburg.

Roda JC

- Eredivisie runner-up: 1994–95

Schalke 04

- UEFA Cup: 1996–97
- DFB-Pokal: 2000–01, 2001–02
- Bundesliga runner-up: 2000–01

Hertha BSC

- DFB-Ligapokal: 2002

1. FC Köln

- 2. Bundesliga: 2004–05

Hamburger SV

- UEFA Intertoto Cup: 2007

PSV

- Johan Cruyff Shield: 2008

Red Bull Salzburg

- Austrian Bundesliga: 2009–10

== See also ==
- List of UEFA Cup winning managers
