= Michael Hartmann (footballer) =

German footballer (born 1974)

Personal information
- Date of birth: 11 July 1974 (age 52)
- Place of birth: Hennigsdorf, East Germany
- Height: 1.73 m (5 ft 8 in)
- Position: Midfielder

Youth career
- Stahl Hennigsdorf
- FSV Borgsdorf
- –1993: BSV Brandenburg

Senior career*
Years	Team	Apps	(Gls)
1992–1994	BSV Brandenburg		
1994–2004	Hertha BSC	240	(10)
2005–2007	Hansa Rostock	47	(1)
2007–2008	Hansa Rostock II	7	(0)

International career
2003	Germany	4	(0)

Managerial career
- 2008–2010: Hansa Rostock U19
- 2010–2013: Hansa Rostock (assistant)
- 2012: Hansa Rostock U17 (caretaker)
- 2013: Hertha BSC (youth coach)
- 2013–2015: Hertha BSC U19
- 2015–2016: Hertha BSC U17
- 2016–2022: Hertha BSC U19
- 2022–2023: Bayern Munich U17
- 2023–2024: Bayern Munich U19
- * Club domestic league appearances and goals

Michael Hartmann (born 11 July 1974) is a German football coach and a former player. Most recently he served as the head coach for Bayern Munich U19.

== Club career ==
Hartmann was born in Hennigsdorf, East Germany. The midfielder played in more than 300 matches in the first three levels of the German football pyramid.

== International career ==
Hartmann made his debut for the Germany national team on 30 April 2003 in a friendly against Serbia and Montenegro. He played in two UEFA Euro 2004 qualifiers, but was not selected for the final tournament squad.

== Coaching career ==
After three years as head coach of the under-19 team for Hansa Rostock he was named on 10 June 2010 as assistant coach of the first team. From 2013 to 2022 Hartmann is coach for the youth ranks of one of his other former clubs as a player, Hertha BSC. In 2022 he was appointed as head coach for Bayern Munich under-17 team.

== Honours ==
Hertha BSC

- DFB-Ligapokal: 2001, 2002
