= Michael Preetz =

German footballer

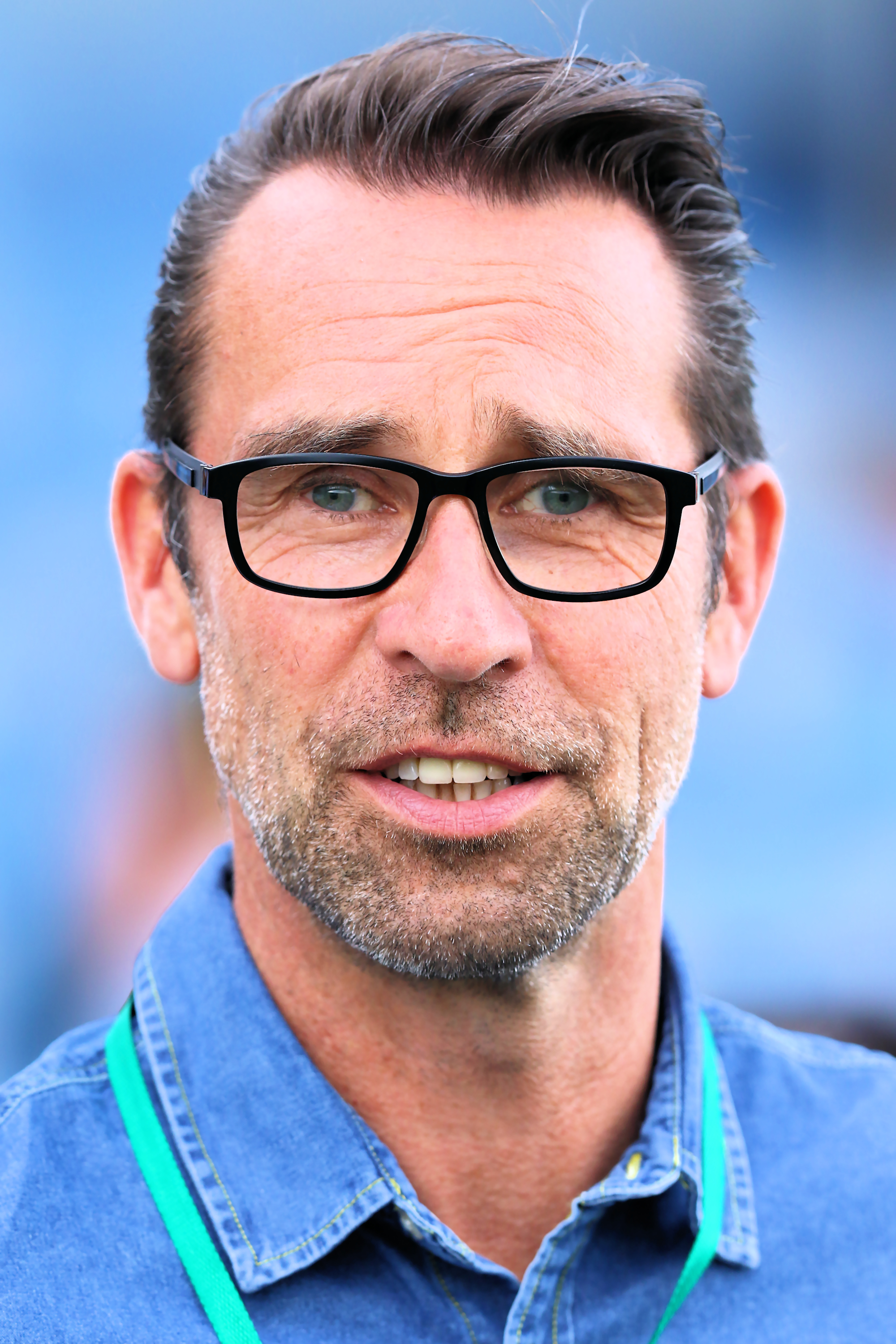
- Preetz in 2019

Personal information
- Full name: Michael Preetz
- Date of birth: 17 August 1967 (age 59)
- Place of birth: Düsseldorf, West Germany
- Height: 1.92 m (6 ft 4 in)
- Position: Forward

Youth career
- –1982: Düsseldorfer SC 99
- 1982–1986: Fortuna Düsseldorf

Senior career*
Years	Team	Apps	(Gls)
1986–1990	Fortuna Düsseldorf	88	(20)
1990–1992	1. FC Saarbrücken	70	(28)
1992–1994	MSV Duisburg	65	(19)
1994–1996	SG Wattenscheid 09	60	(17)
1996–2003	Hertha BSC	227	(93)
Total		529	(177)

International career
1988–1989	West Germany U-21	2	(0)
1999–2000	Germany	7	(3)

Managerial career
- 2003–2009: Hertha BSC (Assistant of the management)
- 2009–2021: Hertha BSC (General manager)
- * Club domestic league appearances and goals

Michael Preetz (born 17 August 1967) is a German former professional footballer who played as a forward. He spent his whole career in Germany, playing for Fortuna Düsseldorf, 1. FC Saarbrücken, MSV Duisburg and SG Wattenscheid 09, but he is mostly remembered for his seven-year spell at Hertha BSC where he ended his career. After retiring from active play, he stayed with the club, going directly into management.

== Playing career ==
Michael Preetz scored 178 goals in the top two divisions of the German league system. In 1998–99 he won the top scorer crown of the Bundesliga.

His good form in this season brought him a call-up to Erich Ribbeck's Germany national team in early 1999. Overall, he won seven caps.

== Managerial career ==
On 7 June 2009, Preetz was named as the new general manager of Hertha BSC, replacing former VfB Stuttgart and FC Bayern Munich forward Dieter Hoeneß. On 23 January 2021, Preetz, along with manager Bruno Labbadia, was relieved of his duties.

== Managerial record ==
As of 24 January 2021

Team	From	To	Record				
Team	From	To	G	W	D	L	Win %
Hertha BSC	7 June 2009	23 January 2021	88	35	19	34	39.77
Total			88	35	19	34	39.77

== Honours ==
Hertha BSC

- Ligapokal: 2001, 2002; runners-up 2000
