= Hertha BSC =

German association football club

- Full name: Hertha, Berliner Sport-Club e. V.
- Nickname: Die Alte Dame (The Old Lady)
- Founded: 25 July 1892; 134 years ago
- Stadium: Olympiastadion
- Capacity: 74,475
- Limited shareholders: 78,8 %: A-CAP; 21,2 %: Hertha BSC e. V.
- President: Fabian Drescher
- Head coach: Stefan Leitl
- League: 2. Bundesliga
- 2025–26: 2. Bundesliga, 7th of 18
- Website: herthabsc.com
Home colours	Away colours	Third colours

Hertha, Berliner Sport-Club e. V., commonly known as Hertha BSC (German pronunciation: [ˈhɛʁtaː beː ʔɛs t͡seː]) or Hertha Berlin, is a German professional football club based in Berlin. Hertha BSC plays in the 2. Bundesliga, the second tier of German football, following relegation from the Bundesliga in 2022–23. Hertha BSC was founded in 1892, and was a founding member of the German Football Association in Leipzig in 1900.

The team won the German championship in 1930 and 1931. Since 1963, Hertha's stadium has been the Olympiastadion. The club is known as Die Alte Dame in German, which translates to "The Old Lady". In 2002, the sports activities of the professional, amateur, and under-19 teams were separated into Hertha BSC GmbH & Co. KGaA.

== History ==
=== Early years ===
The club was formed in 1892 as BFC Hertha 92, taking its name from a steamship with a blue and white smokestack; one of the four young men who founded the club had taken a day trip on this ship with his father. The name Hertha is a variation on Nerthus, referring to a fertility goddess from Germanic mythology. The ship itself was named for the ship's owner's daughter.

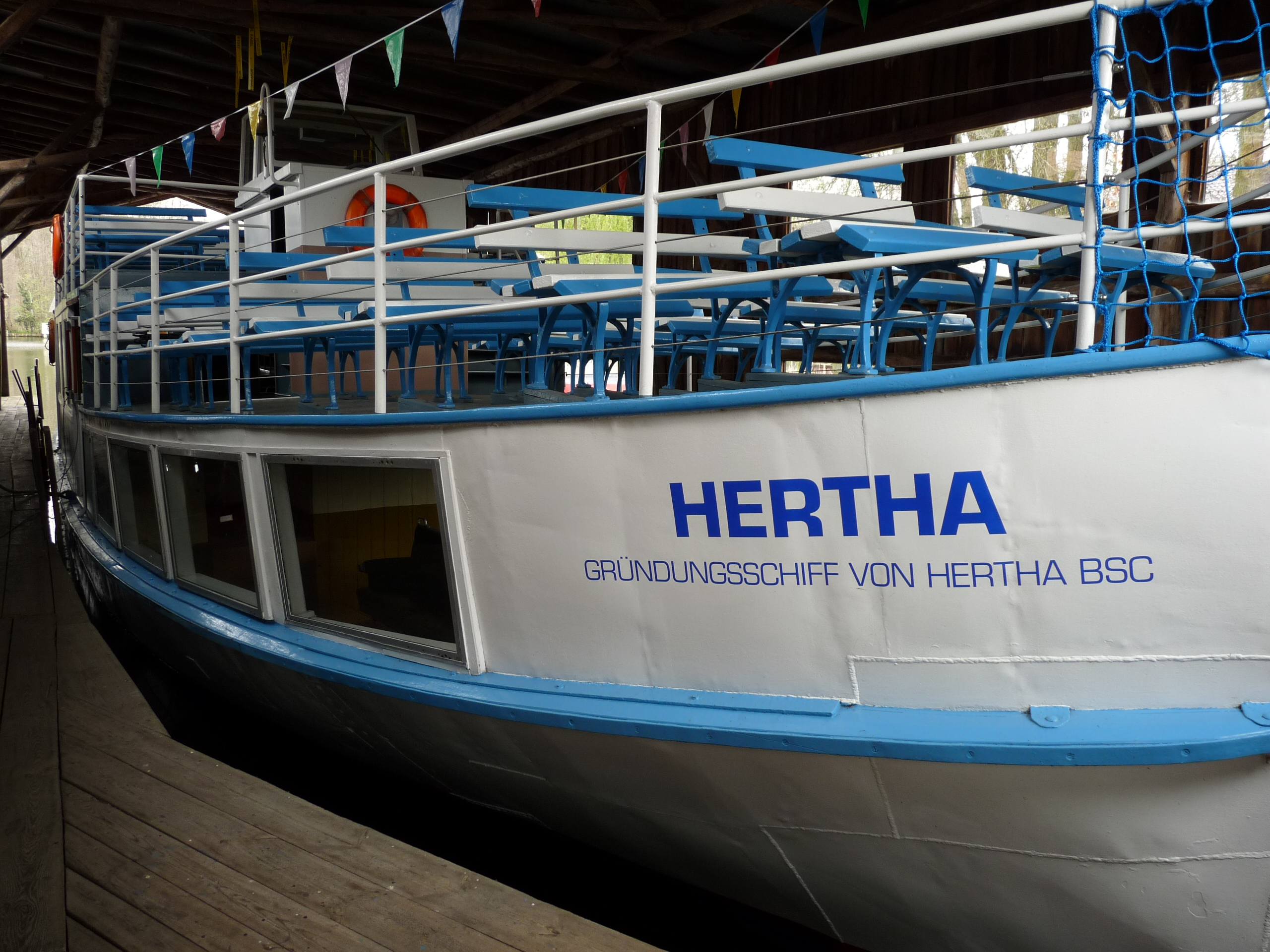
The ship that gave its name to the club

Hertha performed consistently well on the field, including a win in the first Berlin championship final in 1905. In May 1910, Hertha won a friendly match against Southend United, which was considered significant at the time, as England was where the game originated and English clubs dominated the sport. However, their on-field success was not matched financially, and in 1920 the staunchly working-class Hertha merged with the well-heeled club Berliner Sport-Club to form Hertha Berliner Sport-Club. The new team continued to enjoy considerable success in the Oberliga Berlin-Brandenburg. The team played its way to the German championship final in six consecutive seasons from 1926 to 1931, but was only able to win the title in 1930 and 1931, with BSC leaving to become an independent club again after the combined side's first championship. Hertha was the Germany's second most successful team during the inter-war years, after FC Nürnberg.

=== Play under the Third Reich ===
German football was re-organized under the Third Reich in 1933 into 16 top-flight divisions, which saw Hertha playing in the Gauliga Berlin-Brandenburg. The club continued to enjoy success within their division, regularly finishing in the upper half of the table and winning the divisional title in 1935, 1937 and 1944. It faded from prominence, however, due to its inability to advance out of the early rounds of the national championship rounds. Politically, the club was overhauled under Hitler, with Hans Pfeifer, a Nazi party member, being installed as president.

=== Postwar play ===
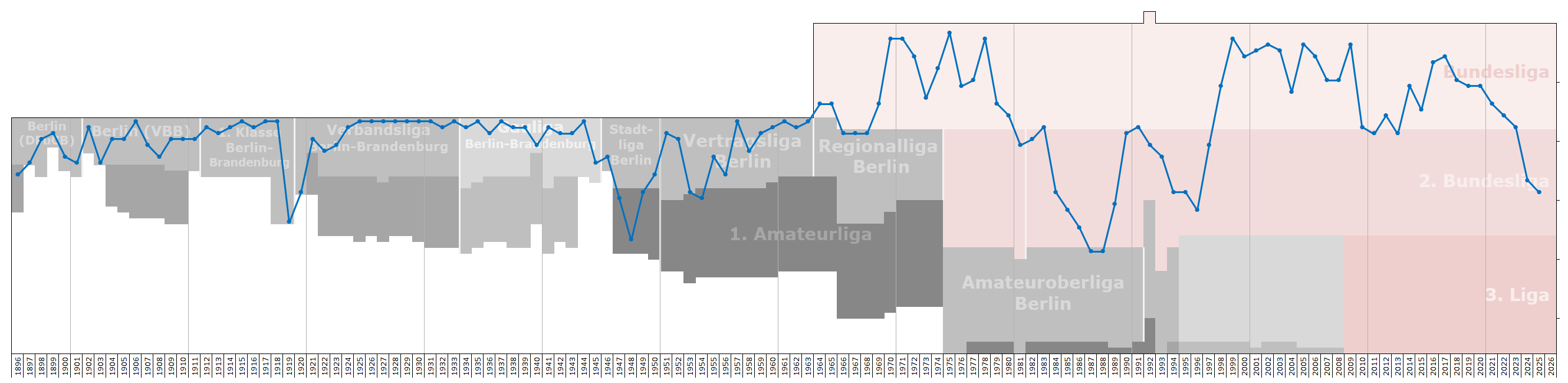
Historical chart of Hertha BSC league performance

Tensions between the western Allies and the Soviets occupying various sectors of the city, and the developing Cold War, led to chaotic conditions for football in the capital. Hertha was banned from playing against East German teams in the 1949–50 season after taking on several players and a coach who had fled the Dresden club SG Friedrichstadt for West Berlin. A number of sides from the eastern half of the city were forced from the Oberliga Berlin to the newly established DDR-Liga beginning with the 1950–51 season.

Through the 1950s, an intense rivalry developed with Tennis Borussia Berlin. A proposal for a merger between the two clubs in 1958 was rejected, with only three of the 266 members voting in favour.

Being a major Berlin side, Hertha had fans in the entirety of Berlin, but following the division of the city, supporters in East Berlin found it both difficult and dangerous to follow the team. In interviews with long-time supporter Helmut Klopfleisch, he described his difficulties as a supporter in East Berlin. Klopfleisch came from the district of Pankow, and, attending his first home match as a young boy in 1954, he became an instant supporter. He continued to attend home matches at the stadium, but with the construction of the Berlin Wall in 1961, this became impossible. Despite this, he did not give up. By this time, Hertha played at the Stadion am Gesundbrunnen, nicknamed Die Plumpe. The stadium was located close enough to the Berlin wall for the sounds from the stadium to be heard over the wall. Thus, Klopfleisch and other supporters gathered behind the wall to listen to the home matches. When the crowd at the stadium cheered, Klopfleisch and the others cheered as well. Klopfleisch later came under suspicion from the Stasi, the East German secret police. He was arrested and interrogated on numerous occasions. He also had his passport confiscated and eventually lost his job as an electrician.

=== Entry to the Bundesliga ===
At the time of the formation of the Bundesliga in 1963, Hertha was Berlin's reigning champion, and so became an inaugural member of the new professional national league. In spite of finishing clear of the relegation zone, the team was demoted after the 1964–65 season following attempts to bribe players to play in the city under what had become decidedly unpleasant circumstances after the erection of the Berlin Wall. This caused something of a crisis for the Bundesliga which wanted, for political reasons, to continue to have a team in its ranks representing the former capital. Through various machinations, this led to the promotion of SC Tasmania 1900 Berlin, which then delivered the worst-ever performance in Bundesliga history. Hertha managed a return to the premier German league in 1968–69 and developed a solid following, making it Berlin's favourite side.

Hertha, however, was again soon touched by scandal through its involvement with several other clubs in the Bundesliga matchfixing scandal of 1971. In the course of an investigation of Hertha's role, it was also revealed that the club was 6 million DM in debt. Financial disaster was averted through the sale of the team's former home ground.

In spite of this, the team found success on the field through the 1970s with a second place Bundesliga finish behind Borussia Mönchengladbach in 1974–75, a semi-final appearance in the 1978–79 UEFA Cup, and two appearances in the final of the DFB-Pokal (1977 and 1979). The following season saw the fortunes of the team take a turn for the worse as it was relegated to the 2. Bundesliga, where it would spend 13 of the next 17 seasons.

Plans in 1982 for a merger with Tennis Borussia Berlin, SpVgg Blau-Weiß 1890 Berlin and SCC Berlin to form a side derisively referred to as "FC Utopia" never came to fruition. Hertha slipped as low as the third tier Amateur Oberliga Berlin, where it spent two seasons (1986–87 and 1987–88). Two turns in the Bundesliga (1982–83 and 1990–91) saw the team immediately relegated after poor performances. Hertha's amateur side enjoyed a greater measure of success, advancing to the final of the DFB-Pokal in 1993, where its run ended in a close 0–1 defeat to Bundesliga club Bayer Leverkusen.

After the fall of the Berlin Wall, Hertha became a popular side in East Berlin as well. Two days after the wall came down, 11,000 East Berliners attended Hertha's match against SG Wattenscheid. A fan friendship with Union Berlin developed, and a friendly match between the two attracted over 50,000 spectators.

Financial woes once more burdened the club in 1994, as it accumulated 10 million DM of debt. The crisis was again resolved through the sale of real estate holdings, in addition to the signing of a new sponsor and management team. By 1997, Hertha had returned to the Bundesliga, where it generally managed to finish in the upper-third of the league table. When Hertha was promoted in 1997, it ended Berlin's six-year-long drought without a Bundesliga side, which had made the Bundesliga the only top league in Europe without representation from its country's biggest city and capital.

=== A period of oscillation ===
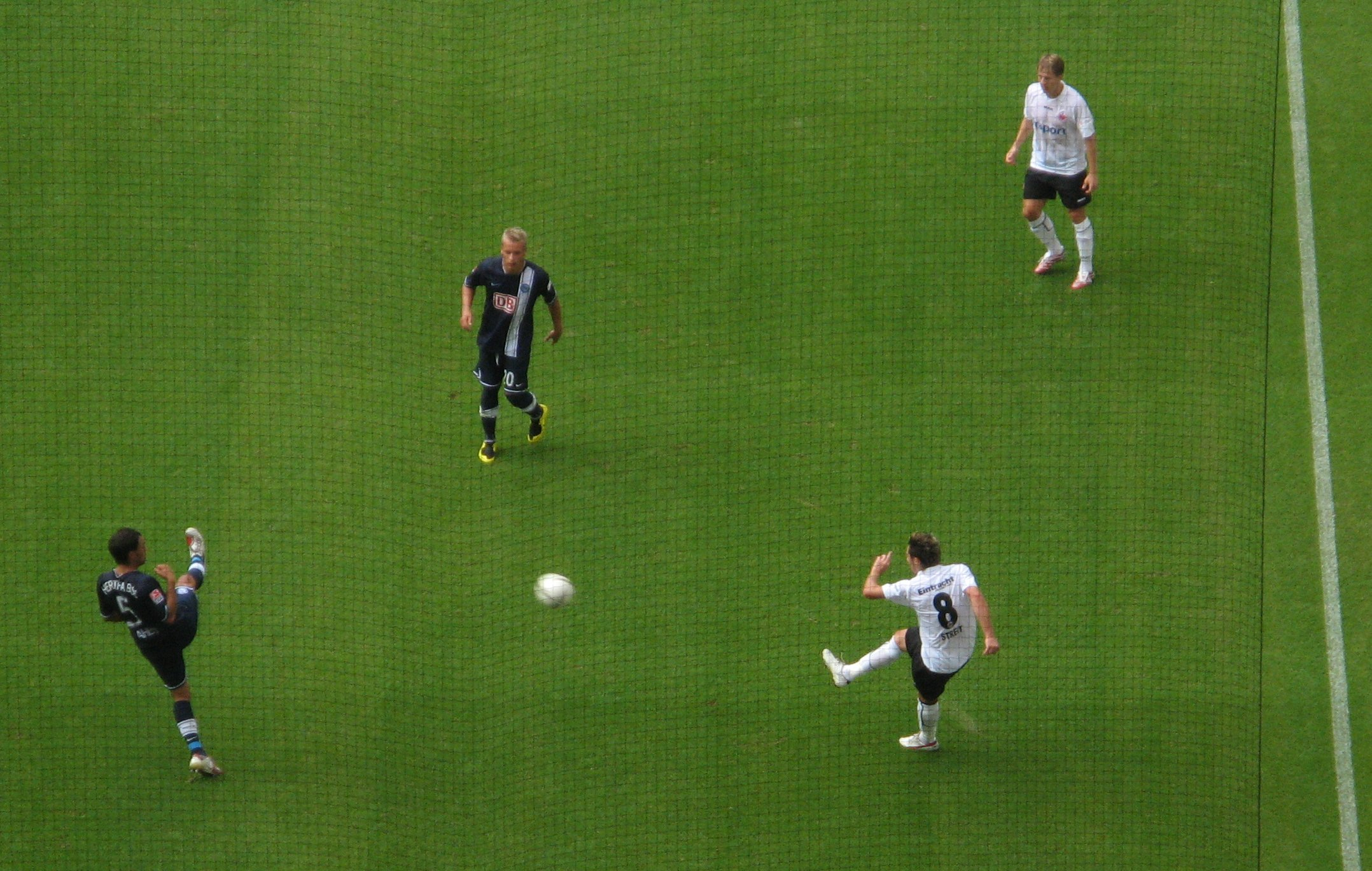
Two years in a row, Hertha's opening Bundesliga fixture was against Eintracht Frankfurt

Hertha's return to the Bundesliga began well, with a continuous string of appearances in international play in the UEFA Cup and the UEFA Champions League beginning in the 1999 season, and the signing of key players such as Pál Dárdai in 1997 who became Hertha's most capped player ever, Sebastian Deisler in 1999 and Brazilian international Marcelinho in 2001, who was named the Bundesliga's Player of the Year in 2005. Hertha also invested heavily in its own youth football academy.

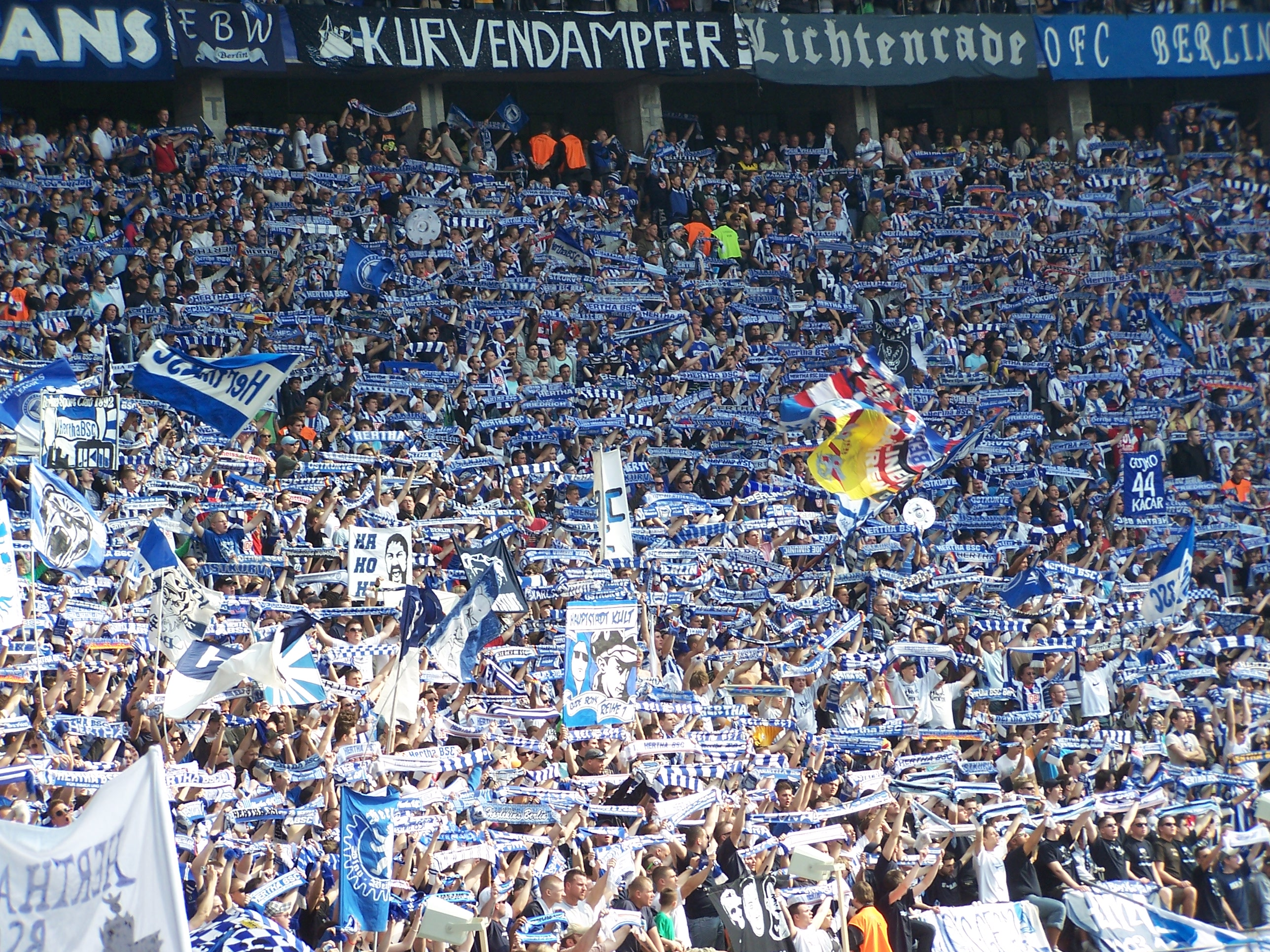
The Ostkurve at the Olympiastadion

Hertha could not maintain its strong run of form, however, and the club's next few years saw dramatic highs and lows. The team was almost relegated in the 2003–04 season, but rebounded and finished fourth the following season, missing out on the Champions League when Hannover 96 held it to a draw on the final day, a result which led to Werder Bremen overtaking them for the spot on the final league matchday (as a "thank-you" gesture, Werder sent the Hannover squad 96 bottles of champagne). In 2005–06, the Herthaner finished in sixth position, then qualified for the UEFA Cup after defeating FC Moscow in the UEFA Intertoto Cup. However, Hertha was eliminated in the first round of the UEFA Cup by Odense BK. In 2006–07, Hertha finished tenth after sacking manager Falko Götz on 11 April. Hertha started the 2007–08 season with new manager Lucien Favre, who had won the Swiss championship in 2006 and 2007 with Zürich. Hertha finished tenth again, but started in the first qualification round of the UEFA Cup via the UEFA Respect Fair Play ranking, making it as far as the group stage of the tournament. After a successful campaign in 2008–09 season, finishing in fourth place and remaining in the title race up until the second to last matchday, the club had a very poor season in 2009–10 season, finishing last in the Bundesliga and suffering relegation.

After spending the 2010–11 season in the 2. Bundesliga, Hertha secured its return to the Bundesliga for 2011–12 by winning 1–0 at MSV Duisburg with three matchdays to play in the season. Hertha, however, finished 16th in the 2011–12 Bundesliga and lost in the relegation playoff to Fortuna Düsseldorf to fall back to the 2. Bundesliga.

In 2012–13, Hertha achieved promotion from the second division as champions for the second time in three seasons. On the opening day of the 2013–14 season, the club beat Eintracht Frankfurt 6–1 at the Olympiastadion to top the Bundesliga table at the end of matchday 1.

On 5 February 2015 Pál Dárdai, Hertha's longest serving and most capped player ever with 366 appearances took over as the manager of the main squad. At the halfway point of the 2015–16 Bundesliga season, Hertha lay in third place, its highest position at the winter break since 2008–09. Despite a late-season slump, Hertha still finished in seventh place for the season, its highest finish in the Bundesliga since 2008–09 during which Hertha finished fourth. The seventh-place finish meant the club secured Europa League football for the 2016–17 season by the means of a third round play-off. Hertha lost the third round play-off 3–2 on aggregate to Brøndby, winning the first leg 1–0 in Berlin, but losing the second away tie 3–1, with Teemu Pukki scoring a hat-trick for the Danish side.

In the 2016–17 Bundesliga season, Hertha enjoyed its best ever start to a Bundesliga season in terms of points won during the opening eight matches, losing just one match – away against Bayern Munich – and forcing a draw away against Borussia Dortmund. At the 2016–17 Bundesliga winter break, Hertha stood at third place in the league, with nine wins, three draws and four losses. Hertha finished the season in 6th place and qualified for the 2017–18 Europa League. Their place in the group stage was secured on 27 May 2017, after Borussia Dortmund defeated Eintracht Frankfurt in the 2017 DFB–Pokal final.

=== Lars Windhorst's era ===
In June 2019, Lars Windhorst bought a €125 million stake in the club. On 27 November 2019, Jürgen Klinsmann became the new manager of Hertha BSC, replacing Ante Čović. Klinsmann left the club on 11 February 2020, after only 76 days in charge. Assistant manager Alexander Nouri took interim charge of the team, before the permanent appointment of Bruno Labbadia on 9 April 2020.

In 2020, Windhorst bought an increased stake in the club, bringing his total investment to almost $500 million. But sporting success did not follow.

On 24 January 2021, Labbadia was sacked as Hertha manager, with the club sitting inside the relegation play off places with his replacement being former manager Pál Dárdai. After nine months in charge and steering the club to safety, Dárdai was terminated as manager and replaced with Tayfun Korkut. Korkut was terminated after just four months in charge with the club sitting 17th on the table in the relegation zone. Korkut was replaced with Felix Magath. Magath managed to steer the club to safety as they won the relegation play-off against Hamburger SV 2–1 on aggregate. After avoiding relegation, Magath was replaced with Sandro Schwarz as manager. Within months of Schwarz's hiring, however, relations between Hertha and Windhorst had deteriorated to the point where Windhorst no longer wanted anything to do with the club. Schwarz was sacked in April 2023 following a 5–2 loss to Schalke 04 that left Hertha at the bottom of the table. Pál Dárdai took over the head coaching job for the third time but he could not prevent Hertha's inevitable relegation , and Hertha were relegated after conceding a 93rd minute equaliser at home to VfL Bochum on Matchday 33.

== Stadium ==
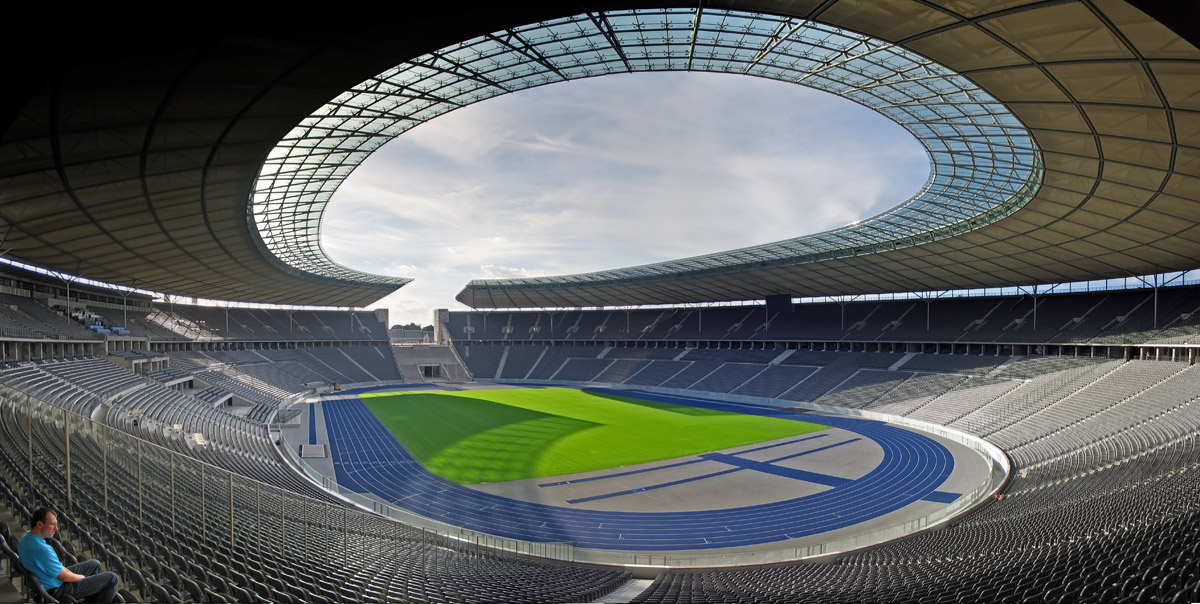
The Olympiastadion after renovation in 2004

Since 1963, Hertha BSC has played its matches in Berlin's Olympiastadion, originally built for the 1936 Summer Olympics.

The stadium has a permanent capacity of 74,649 seats, making it the largest stadium in Germany in terms of seating capacity and the second largest stadium in Germany, behind the Signal Iduna Park in Dortmund, in terms of total capacity. For certain football matches, such as those against Bayern Munich, the capacity can be temporarily expanded. This is made by the addition of mobile grandstand over the Marathon Arch. The extended capacity reached 76,197 seats in 2014.

The stadium underwent major renovations twice, in 1974 and from 2000 to 2004. In both cases, the renovations were for the upcoming FIFA World Cup. In the 1974 upgrades, the stadium received a partial roof. It underwent a thorough modernization for the 2006 World Cup. In addition, the colour of the track was changed to blue to match Hertha's club colours. In addition to Hertha's home games, Olympiastadion serves as one of the home grounds for the Germany national football team, and it hosts concerts, track and field competitions, and the annual DFB-Pokal final. It was also the site for six matches of the 2006 World Cup, including the tournament final.

Hertha played its matches on a sports field on the "Exer" on Schönhauser Allee in Prenzlauer Berg until 1904. This was the first home ground of Hertha. The Exer was a former parade ground of the 1st (Emperor Alexander) Guards Grenadiers and the site is today occupied by the Friedrich-Ludwig-Jahn-Sportpark. Hertha then moved it matches to the Schebera-Sportplatz in the locality of Gesundbrunnen in 1904. The Stadion am Gesundbrunnen was built in the area in 1923. The stadium would be nicknamed "Die Plumpe" and had a capacity of 35,000, of which 3,600 seated. Hertha left the stadium when it joined the Bundesliga in 1963. Hertha returned to the site during the Regionalliga years from 1965 to 1968. The sale of the site in 1971 helped the club avoid bankruptcy.

Due to a lack of spectator interest, Hertha played its 2. Bundesliga and Amateurliga matches from 1986 to 1989 at the Poststadion. The opening fixtures of the 1992–93 season, as well as the Intertoto Cup and UEFA Cup qualifying matches, were played at the Friedrich-Ludwig-Jahn-Sportpark.

It was confirmed on 23 May 2016 that Hertha will continue to play its home matches at the Olympiastadion until 2025.

=== New stadium ===
On 30 March 2017, Hertha announced its intentions to build a new 55,000 seater stadium, to be ready in 2025 when their contract to play at the Olympiastadion runs out. The club noted many factors for this decision, one being that the Berlin side are the only club in the Bundesliga without a dedicated football stadium. In the announcement, the club acknowledged that the Olympiastadion was suitable for major national and international matches, but was too large for the average attendance of a Hertha home game, with only 64% seats being sold; opposed to the Bundesliga average of 92%. On the announcement, the club stated that its preferred option was to construct its own stadium, with a survey identifying a suitable site in Berlin's Olympic Park close to the Olympiastadion. But, at the same time, Berlin's state government indicated a willingness to consider rebuilding the Olympiastadion itself into a football-only venue. However, following the success of the 2018 European Athletics Championships held at the stadium, combined with the potential cost of the conversion, the state government subsequently elected not to proceed, leading Hertha to return to the Olympic Park proposal. However, if that plan was rejected, they also have secondary plans for the stadium to be built in Brandenburg Park, Ludwigsfelde. In September 2026, a site on Jesse-Owens-Allee was determined to be the suitable location for Hertha's new stadium.

== Colours and kit ==
Hertha's club colours are blue and white which come, like its name, from the Hertha steamship. Traditionally, the club wears these colours as stripes, however, since the 1970s, it has employed many different uniforms.

Between the 70s and the 90s, a variety of plain shirts or shirts with large blocks of colour were used, and the team rarely wore its traditional stripes. In 1997, Hertha unveiled a strip with navy blue hoops and shorts, which the team wore for two seasons, abandoning its colours and traditional motif.

The club reintroduced a very traditional kit for the 2000/2001 season, however it continuously flirted with navy uniforms throughout the early 2000s, and navy often appears as part of the home uniform, or as the primary colour of second and third choice strips even today. Since the mid-2000s the club has generally opted for a traditional style of uniform.

The Old Lady also has a historically traditional away kit, being a red and black version of their home.

Traditional home kit	Common away kit

== Crest ==
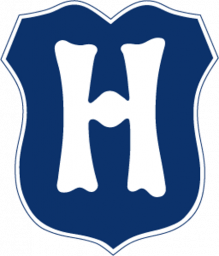
Badge of Hertha Berlin (1892–1923)

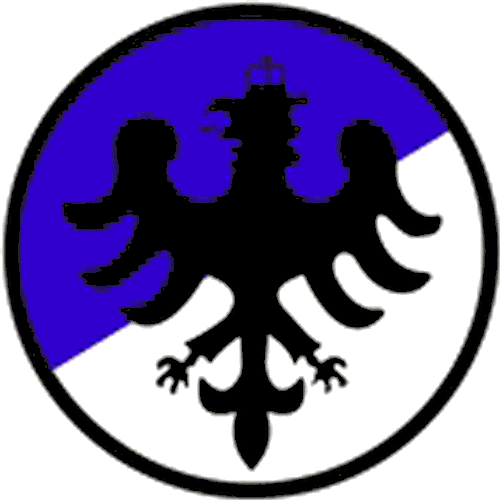
Badge of Hertha Berlin (1923–1931)

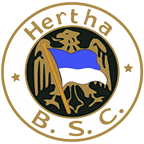
Badge of Hertha Berlin (1931–1933)

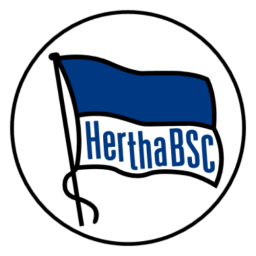
Badge of Hertha Berlin (1968–1974)

Badge of Hertha Berlin (1987–1995, 2012–)

Badge of Hertha Berlin (1995–2012)

== Players ==
=== Current squad ===
As of 2 September 2026

Note: Flags indicate national team as defined under FIFA eligibility rules; some limited exceptions apply. Players may hold more than one non-FIFA nationality.

No.	Pos.	Nation	Player
2	DF	GER	Julian Eitschberger
7	FW	CRO	Josip Brekalo (captain)
8	MF	GER	Kevin Sessa
9	FW	SWE	Gustaf Nilsson (on loan from Club Brugge)
13	GK	GER	Konstantin Heide
17	FW	DEN	Sebastian Grønning
18	FW	GER	Luca Schuler
19	MF	AUT	Oluwaseun Adewumi (on loan from Burnley)
20	FW	GER	Farid Alfa-Ruprecht (on loan from Bayer Leverkusen)
21	MF	GER	Boris Mamuzah Lum
22	DF	DEN	Mads Pedersen
24	FW	ISL	Jón Dagur Þorsteinsson
26	FW	GER	Niklas Hildebrandt
27	DF	GER	Niklas Kolbe

No.	Pos.	Nation	Player
28	FW	GER	Jelani Ndi
29	DF	GER	Jerome Diallo
30	MF	GER	Paul Seguin
31	DF	HUN	Márton Dárdai
33	MF	GER	Soufian Gouram
34	DF	GER	Mayson Grothe
35	GK	GER	Marius Gersbeck
36	MF	TUR	Kian Todorović
41	DF	GER	Pascal Klemens
42	DF	SUR	Deyovaisio Zeefuik
43	GK	GER	Tim Goller
44	DF	GER	Linus Gechter
47	MF	EGY	Selim Telib

=== Out on loan ===
Note: Flags indicate national team as defined under FIFA eligibility rules; some limited exceptions apply. Players may hold more than one non-FIFA nationality.

No.	Pos.	Nation	Player
—	DF	GER	Janne Berner (at SC Verl until 30 June 2027)
—	MF	LTU	Lukas Michelbrink (at Energie Cottbus until 30 June 2027)

No.	Pos.	Nation	Player
—	FW	DEN	Gustav Christensen (at Kristiansund until 31 December 2026)

=== Player records ===
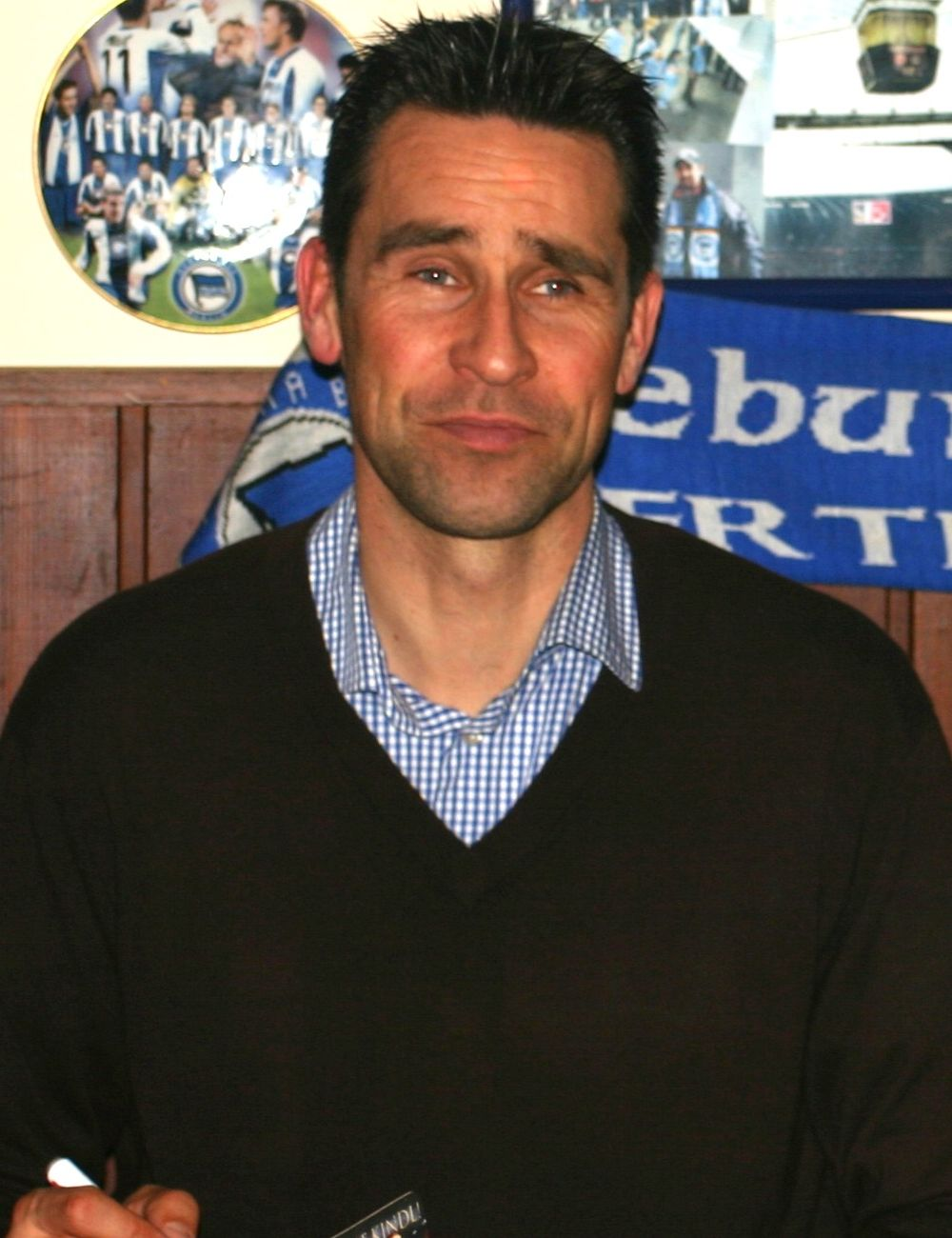
Michael Preetz is Hertha's top goalscorer in the Bundesliga.

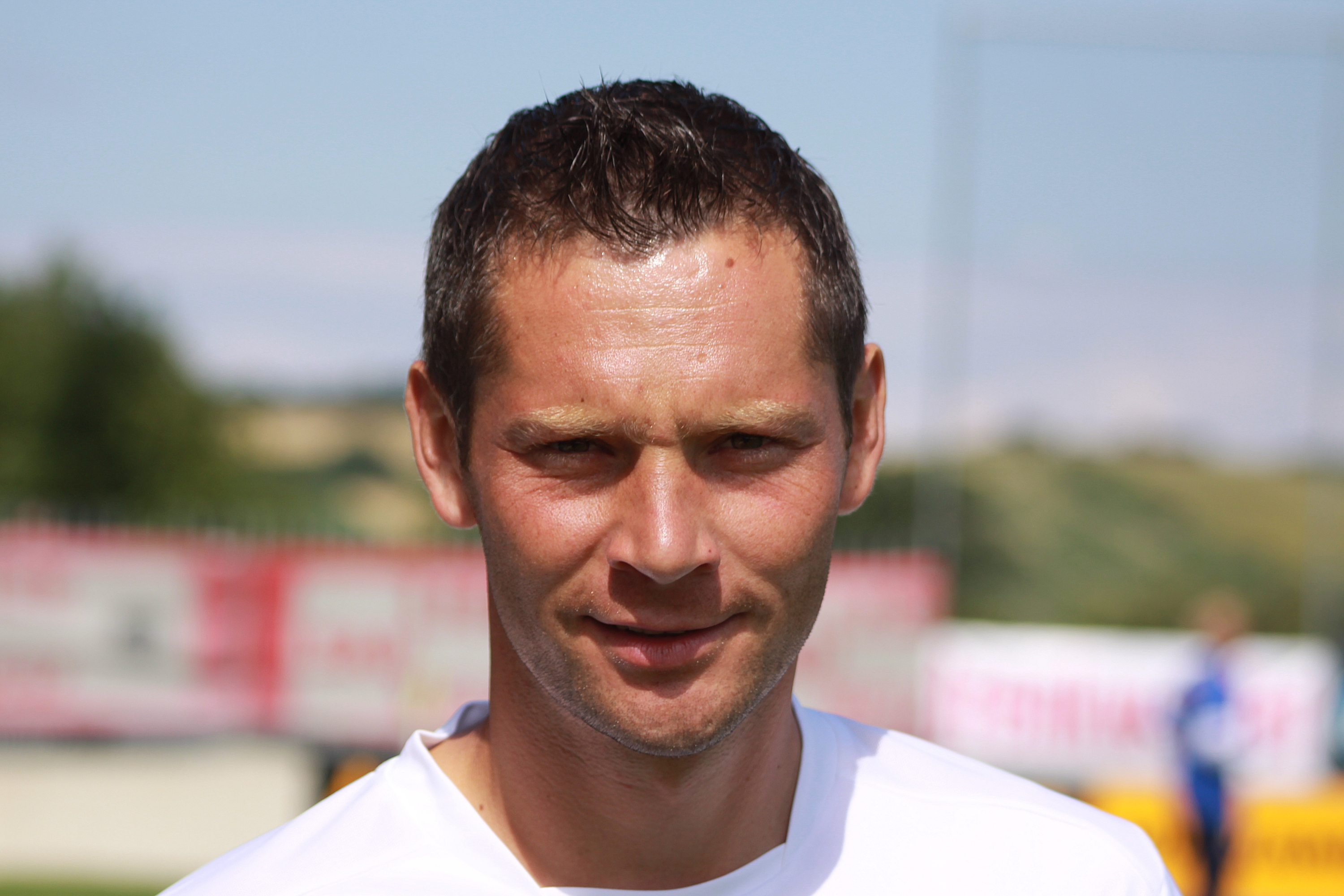
Pál Dárdai is Hertha's most capped player ever.

- Most Bundesliga/2. Bundesliga appearances – 366; (Hungary) Pál Dárdai
- Most Bundesliga goals scored – 93; (Germany) Michael Preetz

=== "Squad of the Century" ===
For the club's 111th birthday, Hertha fans elected the "Squad of the Century".

Pos	Player	Period
GK	Gábor Király	1997–04
DF	Arne Friedrich	2002–10
DF	Ludwig Müller	1972–75
DF	Uwe Kliemann	1974–80
DF	Eyjólfur Sverrisson	1995–03
MF	Kjetil Rekdal	1997–00
MF	Hanne Sobek	1924–45
MF	Erich Beer	1971–79
MF	Marcelinho	2001–06
FW	Axel Kruse	1989–91; 1996–98
FW	Michael Preetz	1996–03
Substitutes
GK	Norbert Nigbur	1976–79
DF	Hans Weiner	1972–79; 1982–86
DF	Otto Rehhagel	1962–66
MF	Lorenz Horr	1969–77
FW	Karl-Heinz Granitza	1976–79

=== Former players ===
- (Thailand) Witthaya Hloagune

== Current staff ==
As of 18 February 2025

Position	Name
Head coach	(Germany) Stefan Leitl
Assistant coach	(Croatia) Andre Mijatović
Goalkeeper coach	(Germany) Andreas Menger
Head of athletics	(Germany) Henrik Kuchno
Rehabilitation athletic coach	(Germany) Hendrik Vieth
Talent & transition trainer	(Germany) Michael Hartmann
Game analyst	(Germany) Fynn-Cedric Bach
Game analyst	(Germany) Ole Marschall
Sporting director	(Germany) Benjamin Weber
Coordinator sport	(Tunisia) Sami Allagui
Team management	(Germany) Maximilian Fürst
Team management	(Germany) Gabriel Bratić
Medical director & team doctor	(Austria) Fabian Plachel
Team doctor	(Austria) Dr. Gerald Ackerl
Coordinator for imaging and image-guided interventions	(Germany) Dr. Markus Lerchbaumer
Internist	(Germany) Dr. Klaus Neye
Sports psychologist	(Germany) Paula Isringhausen
Physiotherapist	(Germany) Anne Kaube
Physiotherapist	(Germany) Jürgen Lange
Physiotherapist	(Austria) Maximilian Plachel
Equipment manager	(Poland) Robert Abramczyk

== Coaches ==
No.	Coach	From	To	Matches	W				
No.	Coach	From	To	Matches	W	D	L	Win %	Trophies Won
1	(Germany) Josef Schneider	1 July 1963	9 March 1965	55	16	14	25	29.09	None
2	(Germany) Gerhard Schulte	9 March 1965	30 June 1966	38	32	3	3	84.21	1965–66 Regionalliga Berlin
3	(Germany) Helmut Kronsbein	1 July 1966	13 March 1974	223	92	53	78	41.26	None
4	(Germany) Hans Eder	17 March 1974	30 June 1974	9	3	1	5	33.33	None
5	(Germany) Dettmar Cramer	1 July 1974	9 July 1974	0	0	0	0	—	None
6	(Germany) Hans Eder	10 July 1974	16 July 1974	0	0	0	0	—	None
7	(Germany) Georg Kessler	17 July 1974	30 June 1977	118	54	26	38	45.76	None
8	(Germany) Kuno Klötzer	1 July 1977	27 October 1979	94	38	25	31	40.43	None
9	(Germany) Hans Eder	28 October 1979	26 December 1979	7	1	3	3	14.29	None
10	(Germany) Helmut Kronsbein	27 December 1979	30 June 1980	19	8	3	8	42.11	None
11	(Germany) Uwe Klimaschefski	1 July 1980	8 December 1981	62	41	5	16	66.13	None
12	(Germany) Georg Gawliczek	9 December 1981	10 December 1983	59	20	15	24	33.90	None
13	(Germany) Martin Luppen	11 December 1983	25 May 1984	43	16	12	15	37.21	None
14	(Germany) Hans Eder	26 May 1984	30 June 1984	0	0	0	0	—	None
15	(Germany) Uwe Kliemann	1 July 1984	11 November 1985	61	16	23	22	26.23	None
16	(Germany) Hans Eder	11 November 1985	31 December 1985	1	0	1	0	0.00	None
17	(Germany) Rudi Gutendorf	1 January 1986	18 April 1986	13	2	5	6	15.38	None
18	(Germany) Jürgen Sundermann	19 April 1986	8 October 1988	18	4	5	9	22.22	None
19	(Germany) Werner Fuchs	13 October 1988	13 November 1990	79	33	22	24	41.77	1989–90 2. Bundesliga
20	(Hungary) Pál Csernai	13 November 1990	12 March 1991	6	1	3	2	16.67	None
21	(Germany) Peter Neururer	13 March 1991	28 May 1991	12	0	2	10	0.00	None
22	(Germany) Karsten Heine	28 May 1991	30 June 1991	3	1	0	2	33.33	None
23	(Germany) Bernd Stange	1 July 1991	20 August 1992	41	14	12	15	34.15	None
24	(Germany) Günter Sebert	21 August 1992	20 October 1993	55	24	19	12	43.64	None
25	(Germany) Karsten Heine	20 October 1993	23 October 1993	1	0	0	1	0.00	None
26	(Germany) Uwe Reinders	24 October 1993	23 March 1994	11	2	4	5	18.18	None
27	(Germany) Karsten Heine	23 March 1994	31 December 1995	70	23	23	24	32.86	None
28	(Germany) Jürgen Röber	1 January 1996	6 February 2002	227	112	57	58	49.34	2001 DFB-Ligapokal
29	(Germany) Falko Götz (interim)	6 February 2002	30 June 2002	13	9	1	3	69.23	None
30	(Netherlands) Huub Stevens	1 July 2002	4 December 2003	64	25	17	22	39.06	2002 DFB-Ligapokal
31	(Germany) Andreas Thom (interim)	4 December 2003	17 December 2003	3	0	2	1	0.00	None
32	(Germany) Hans Meyer	1 January 2004	30 June 2004	17	7	5	5	41.18	None
33	(Germany) Falko Götz	1 July 2004	10 April 2007	121	47	40	34	38.84	None
34	(Germany) Karsten Heine (interim)	10 April 2007	30 June 2007	6	3	0	3	50.00	None
35	(Switzerland) Lucien Favre	1 July 2007	28 September 2009	94	40	20	34	42.55	None
36	(Germany) Karsten Heine (interim)	29 September 2009	3 October 2009	1	0	0	1	0.00	None
37	(Germany) Friedhelm Funkel	3 October 2009	30 June 2010	33	7	10	16	21.21	None
38	(Germany) Markus Babbel	1 July 2010	18 December 2011	55	30	13	12	54.55	2010–11 2. Bundesliga
39	(Germany) Rainer Widmayer (interim)	18 December 2011	21 December 2011	1	1	0	0	100.00	None
40	(Germany) Michael Skibbe	22 December 2011	12 February 2012	5	0	0	5	0.00	None
41	(Germany) René Tretschok (interim)	14 February 2012	19 February 2012	1	0	0	1	0.00	None
42	(Germany) Otto Rehhagel	19 February 2012	30 June 2012	14	3	3	8	21.43	None
43	(Netherlands) Jos Luhukay	1 July 2012	5 February 2015	71	34	18	19	47.89	2012–13 2. Bundesliga
44	(Hungary) Pál Dárdai	5 February 2015	30 June 2019	172	64	44	64	37.21	None
45	(Croatia) Ante Čović	1 July 2019	27 November 2019	14	4	3	7	28.57	None
46	(Germany) Jürgen Klinsmann	27 November 2019	11 February 2020	10	3	3	4	30.00	None
47	(Germany) Alexander Nouri (interim)	12 February 2020	8 April 2020	4	1	2	1	25.00	None
48	(Germany) Bruno Labbadia	9 April 2020	24 January 2021	28	8	6	14	28.57	None
49	(Hungary) Pál Dárdai	25 January 2021	29 November 2021	32	10	9	13	31.25	None
50	(Turkey) Tayfun Korkut	29 November 2021	13 March 2022	14	2	3	9	14.29	None
51	(Germany) Felix Magath	13 March 2022	23 May 2022	9	3	1	5	33.33	None
52	(Germany) Sandro Schwarz	19 June 2022	16 April 2023	28	5	7	16	17.86	None
53	(Hungary) Pál Dárdai	16 April 2023	30 June 2024	35	13	9	13	37.14	None
54	(Germany) Cristian Fiél	1 July 2024	17 February 2025	25	9	4	12	36.00	None
55	(Germany) Stefan Leitl	18 February 2025	present	44	20	14	10	45.45	None

== Honours ==
=== Domestic ===
- German Champions:
  - Winners: 1930, 1931
  - Runners-up: 1926, 1927, 1928, 1929, 1974–75
- 2. Bundesliga:
  - Winners: 1989–90, 2010–11, 2012–13
  - Runners-up: 1981–82
- DFB-Ligapokal:
  - Winners: 2001, 2002
  - Runners-up: 2000
- DFB-Pokal:
  - Runners-up: 1976–77, 1978–79, 1992–93 ^{1}

Note 1: Reserve Team

=== International ===
- UEFA Cup:
  - Semi-finals: 1978–79

=== Tournaments ===
- Nova Supersports Cup:
  - Runners-up: 1999

=== Regional ===
- Berlin/Brandenburg Champions (−1933):
  - Winners (12): 1906, (Note: Competition organized by football association Verband Berliner Ballspielvereine (VBB)) 1915, (Note: VBB-Verbandsliga, organized by football association Verband Brandenburgischer Ballspielvereine (VBB).) 1917, 1918, 1925, (Note: VBB-Oberliga, organized by football association Verband Brandenburgischer Ballspielvereine (VBB).) 1926, 1927, 1928, 1929, 1930, 1931, 1933
  - Runners-up: 1914, 1916
- Gauliga Berlin-Brandenburg:
  - Winners: 1935, 1937, 1944
  - Runners-up: 1934, 1938, 1939, 1941
- Oberliga Berlin (1945–63):
  - Winners: 1957, 1961, 1963
  - Runners-up: 1960, 1962
- Regionalliga Berlin: (II)
  - Winners: 1966, 1967, 1968
- Amateur-Oberliga Berlin: (III)
  - Winners: 1949, 1987, 1988
  - Runners-up: 1954
- Berlin Cup: (Tiers III–VII)
  - Winners (13): 1920, 1924, 1928, 1929, 1943, 1958, 1959, 1966, 1967, 1976, (Note: Reserve team.) 1987, 1992, 2004
  - Runners-up: 2006

=== Youth ===
- German Under 19 Championship
  - Winners: 2018
  - Runners-up: 2022
- German Under 17 Championship
  - Winners: 2000, 2003, 2005, 2012
  - Runners-up: 1991, 2013
- Under 19 Bundesliga North/Northeast
  - Winners: 2005, 2006, 2018, 2022, 2023
  - Runners-up: 2003, 2004, 2012, 2017
- Under 17 Bundesliga North/Northeast
  - Winners: 2008, 2010, 2012, 2013, 2020, 2022
  - Runners-up: 2011, 2014, 2018, 2019
- Under 19 DFB-Pokal (de)
  - Winners: 2004, 2015
  - Runners-up: 2010, 2012, 2016
- Under 17 NOFV-Pokal (de)
  - Winners: (4) 2001, 2008, 2012, 2014

== In European football ==
Accurate as of 10 December 2017

Competition	Pld	W	D	L	GF	GA	GD	Win %
UEFA Champions League	14	3	5	6	11	19	−8	21.43
UEFA Cup / UEFA Europa League	80	37	21	22	102	73	+29	46.25
UEFA Intertoto Cup	2	1	1	0	2	0	+2	50.00
Total	96	41	27	28	115	92	+23	42.71

== Women's football ==
Missing out on a trend of promoting women's football, Hertha became one of a decreasing number of major German football clubs left outside the top of women's football. Several steps had been taken to develop women's football, but most of them ended up inconclusive. The change came in 2009, when the club announced that it was to launch a cooperation in women's football with 1. FC Lübars, a football club from the Berlin borough Reinickendorf and with decades of history in women's football.

From one side, the partnership meant that Hertha was to provide Lübars with various forms of support, including financial support, expertise in licensing and sponsor acquisition, equipment and training instruction – investing approximately 1 million Euros in the project. From the other side, the partnership meant that Lübars was to compete in the colours of Hertha, thus earning the nickname Die Hertha-Frauen ('The Hertha-women'). In the long run, the club plans for the team of 1. FC Lübars to be integrated with Hertha BSC.

In summer 2023, Hertha BSC officially launched its women's department by absorbing all women's teams from Hertha 03 Zehlendorf.
