= 2003–04 Hertha BSC season =

Hertha BSC
2003–04 season
- Manager: Huub Stevens (until 4 December); Andreas Thom (interim, between 4 and 17 December); Hans Meyer (from 20 December)
- Bundesliga: 12th
- UEFA Cup: First round
- DFB-Pokal: Round of 16
- DFB-Ligapokal: Preliminary round
| Home colours | Away colours |

During the 2003–04 season, Hertha BSC competed in the Bundesliga.

== Season summary ==
After five seasons of finishing in the European places, Hertha slumped to 12th, seven points clear of relegation. Manager Huub Stevens had paid for the poor form with his job in December, and his replacement Hans Meyer failed to continue Hertha's streak of European qualification. Meyer left at the end of the season, with Falko Götz - a former Hertha BSC II manager and Hertha caretaker manager - appointed as his replacement.

== Players ==
=== First-team squad ===
Squad at end of season

Note: Flags indicate national team as defined under FIFA eligibility rules; some limited exceptions apply. Players may hold more than one non-FIFA nationality.

| No. | Pos. | Nation | Player |
|---|---|---|---|
| 1 | GK | HUN | Gábor Király |
| 3 | DF | GER | Arne Friedrich |
| 4 | DF | NED | Dick van Burik |
| 5 | MF | CRO | Niko Kovač (Note: Kovač was born in West Berlin, West Germany (now Berlin, Germany), but also qualified to represent Croatia and Bosnia and Herzegovina internationally through his parents and made his international debut for Croatia in December 1996.) |
| 7 | MF | POL | Bartosz Karwan |
| 8 | MF | BEL | Bart Goor |
| 10 | MF | BRA | Marcelinho |
| 11 | FW | POL | Artur Wichniarek |
| 12 | GK | GER | Christian Fiedler |
| 13 | FW | GER | Fredi Bobic (Note: Bobic was born in Maribor, Yugoslavia (now Slovenia), but also was raised in West Germany (now Germany) from a few months after birth and made his international debut for Germany in 1994.) |
| 14 | DF | CRO | Josip Šimunić (Note: Šimunić was born in Canberra, Australia, but also qualified to represent Croatia and Bosnia and Herzegovina internationally through his parents and made his international debut for Croatia in November 2001.) |
| 15 | FW | GER | Giuseppe Reina |
| 16 | MF | GER | Roberto Pinto |
| 17 | DF | GER | Alexander Madlung |

| No. | Pos. | Nation | Player |
|---|---|---|---|
| 18 | MF | HUN | Pál Dárdai |
| 19 | MF | GER | Andreas Schmidt |
| 20 | MF | GER | Andreas Neuendorf |
| 21 | MF | GER | Michael Hartmann |
| 22 | DF | GER | Denis Lapaczinski |
| 23 | DF | DEN | Dennis Cagara (Note: Cagara was born in Glostrup, Denmark, and represented Denmark at U-16, U-17, U-18, U-19, U-20, and U-21 level, but also qualified to represent the Philippines internationally through his father and made his international debut for the Philippines in October 2011.) |
| 24 | FW | ANG | Nando Rafael (Note: Rafael was born in Luanda, Angola, but was raised in the Netherlands from the age of 8, later gained German citizenship, and represented Germany at U-21 level before making his international debut for Angola in 2012.) |
| 25 | MF | GER | Alexander Ludwig |
| 27 | MF | BUL | Aleksandar Mladenov |
| 28 | DF | GER | Sofian Chahed (Note: Chahed was born in West Berlin, West Germany (now Berlin, Germany), and represented Germany at U-19 and U-20 level, but also qualified to represent Tunisia internationally and made his debut for Tunisia in October 2009.) |
| 29 | DF | GER | Malik Fathi |
| 32 | MF | GER | Thorben Marx |
| 33 | DF | GER | Marko Rehmer |
| 40 | GK | POL | Tomasz Kuszczak |

=== Left club during season ===
Note: Flags indicate national team as defined under FIFA eligibility rules; some limited exceptions apply. Players may hold more than one non-FIFA nationality.

| No. | Pos. | Nation | Player |
|---|---|---|---|
| 9 | FW | BRA | Luizão (to Botafogo) |

=== Hertha BSC II ===
Note: Flags indicate national team as defined under FIFA eligibility rules; some limited exceptions apply. Players may hold more than one non-FIFA nationality.

| No. / Pos. / Nation / Player; 26 / MF / GER / René Tretschok | No. / Pos. / Nation / Player; 44 / FW / CMR / Joël Tchami |

== Transfers ==
=== Out ===
Note: Flags indicate national team as defined under FIFA eligibility rules; some limited exceptions apply. Players may hold more than one non-FIFA nationality.

| No. | Pos. | Nation | Player |
|---|---|---|---|
| 6 | DF | ISL | Eyjólfur Sverrisson (retired) |
| 15 | DF | BRA | Nenê (to Vitória) |
| 22 | MF | GER | Stefan Beinlich (to Hamburg) |
| 35 | MF | GER | Benjamin Köhler (to Rot-Weiss Essen) |
| 25 | MF | NED | Rob Maas (to Duisburg) |
| 28 | MF | MKD | Nderim Nexhipi (to Wolfsburg) |
| 11 | FW | GER | Michael Preetz (retired) |
| 24 | FW | NOR | Trond Fredrik Ludvigsen (to Bodø/Glimt) |
| 17 | FW | BIH | Sead Zilić (Note: Zilić was born in Prijepolje, SFR Yugoslavia (now Serbia, but at the time part of Serbia and Montenegro), but also holds Bosnian and Slovenian citizenship.) (to Drava Ptuj) |
| 7 | FW | BRA | Alex Alves (to Atlético Mineiro) |

== Bundesliga ==
=== League table ===
| Pos | Team | Pld | W | D | L | GF | GA | GD | Pts |
|---|---|---|---|---|---|---|---|---|---|
| 8 | VfL Bochum | 34 | 13 | 6 | 15 | 49 | 50 | −1 | 45 |
| 9 | Borussia Dortmund | 34 | 12 | 8 | 14 | 41 | 43 | −2 | 44 |
| 10 | Hertha BSC | 34 | 12 | 8 | 14 | 50 | 55 | −5 | 44 |
| 11 | Hannover 96 | 34 | 12 | 8 | 14 | 41 | 50 | −9 | 44 |
| 12 | Arminia Bielefeld | 34 | 11 | 9 | 14 | 47 | 49 | −2 | 42 |

Source: kicker.de
Rules for classification: 1) Points; 2) Goal difference; 3) Goals scored

=== Matches ===
Bundesliga match details
| Match | Date | Time | Opponent | Venue | Result F–A | Scorers | Attendance | Ref. |
|---|---|---|---|---|---|---|---|---|
| 1 | 2 August 2003 | 15:30 | Werder Bremen | Home | 0–3 | | 40,152 | |
| 2 | 10 August 2003 | 17:30 | VfB Stuttgart | Away | 0–0 | | 35,000 | |
| 3 | 16 August 2003 | 15:30 | SC Freiburg | Home | 0–0 | | 32,508 | |
| 4 | 23 August 2003 | 15:30 | Eintracht Frankfurt | Away | 0–0 | | 22,500 | |
| 5 | 13 September 2003 | 15:30 | Hannover 96 | Home | 2–3 | Bobic 14', 21' | 30,000 | |
| 6 | 20 September 2003 | 15:30 | VfL Bochum | Away | 2–2 | Neuendorf 6', 66' | 21,999 | |
| 7 | 28 September 2003 | 17:30 | Hamburger SV | Home | 1–1 | Friedrich 32' | 36,876 | |
| 8 | 4 October 2003 | 15:30 | Bayern Munich | Away | 1–4 | Kovač 65' | 63,000 | |
| 9 | 18 October 2003 | 15:30 | Bayer Leverkusen | Home | 1–4 | Bobic 47' | 36,638 | |
| 10 | 25 October 2003 | 15:30 | Hansa Rostock | Away | 1–0 | Luizão 32' | 22,000 | |
| 11 | 1 November 2003 | 15:30 | VfL Wolfsburg | Away | 0–3 | | 21,325 | |
| 12 | 8 November 2003 | 15:30 | Borussia Mönchengladbach | Home | 2–1 | Luizão 17', Madlung 85' | 32,963 | |
| 13 | 23 November 2003 | 17:30 | 1. FC Kaiserslautern | Away | 2–4 | Rafael 37', Knavs 45' (o.g.) | 33,200 | |
| 14 | 30 November 2003 | 17:30 | Schalke 04 | Home | 1–3 | Lapaczinski 37' | 37,325 | |
| 15 | 6 December 2003 | 15:30 | Borussia Dortmund | Away | 1–1 | Madlung 79' | 77,000 | |
| 16 | 13 December 2003 | 15:30 | 1860 Munich | Home | 1–1 | Costa 53' (o.g.) | 27,112 | |
| 17 | 16 December 2003 | 20:00 | 1. FC Köln | Away | 0–3 | | 35,000 | |
| 18 | 31 January 2004 | 15:30 | Werder Bremen | Away | 0–4 | | 34,500 | |
| 19 | 8 February 2004 | 17:30 | VfB Stuttgart | Home | 1–0 | Bobic 87' | 39,153 | |
| 20 | 14 February 2004 | 15:30 | SC Freiburg | Away | 3–2 | Friedrich 22', Neuendorf 44', Reina 62' | 22,950 | |
| 21 | 22 February 2004 | 17:30 | Eintracht Frankfurt | Home | 1–2 | Rafael 62' | 37,389 | |
| 22 | 29 February 2004 | 17:30 | Hannover 96 | Away | 3–1 | Marcelinho 41', 81', Reina 78' | 21,755 | |
| 23 | 6 March 2004 | 15:30 | VfL Bochum | Home | 1–1 | Marcelinho 20' | 31,600 | |
| 24 | 13 March 2004 | 15:30 | Hamburger SV | Away | 0–2 | | 44,181 | |
| 25 | 20 March 2004 | 15:30 | Bayern Munich | Home | 1–1 | Marcelinho 42' (pen.) | 60,800 | |
| 26 | 27 March 2004 | 15:30 | Bayer Leverkusen | Away | 1–4 | Marcelinho 7' | 22,500 | |
| 27 | 3 April 2004 | 15:30 | Hansa Rostock | Home | 1–1 | Rasmussen 65' | 47,305 | |
| 28 | 10 April 2004 | 15:30 | VfL Wolfsburg | Home | 1–0 | Rafael 22' | 33,970 | |
| 29 | 17 April 2004 | 15:30 | Borussia Mönchengladbach | Away | 1–1 | Pinto 9' | 34,500 | |
| 30 | 24 April 2004 | 15:30 | 1. FC Kaiserslautern | Home | 3–0 | Marcelinho 2', Wichniarek 16', Bobic 24' | 45,292 | |
| 31 | 2 May 2004 | 17:30 | Schalke 04 | Away | 0–3 | | 61,266 | |
| 32 | 8 May 2004 | 15:30 | Borussia Dortmund | Home | 6–2 | Kehl 7' (o.g.), Marcelinho 19', Bobic 37', Wichniarek 58', Neuendorf 86', Rafael 90+2' | 56,307 | |
| 33 | 15 May 2004 | 15:30 | 1860 Munich | Away | 1–1 | Madlung 81' | 48,000 | |
| 34 | 22 May 2004 | 15:30 | 1. FC Köln | Home | 3–1 | Marcelinho 51' (pen.), Bobic 63', Rafael 78' | 56,083 | |

== DFB-Pokal ==
DFB-Pokal match details
| Round | Date | Time | Opponent | Venue | Result F–A | Scorers | Attendance | Ref. |
|---|---|---|---|---|---|---|---|---|
| First round | 30 August 2003 | 15:00 | SSV Reutlingen 05 | Away | 6–1 | Madlung 15', 66', Friedrich 44', Wichniarek 48', Šimunić 51', Karwan 56' | 2,687 | |
| Second round | 28 October 2003 | 19:30 | Hansa Rostock | Away | 2–2 (a.e.t.) (4–3 p) | Luizão 19', Rafael 120' | 10,100 | |
| Round of 16 | 3 December 2003 | 19:30 | Werder Bremen | Away | 1–6 | Marcelinho 89' | 22,100 | |

== DFB-Ligapokal ==
DFB-Ligapokal match details
| Round | Date | Time | Opponent | Venue | Result F–A | Scorers | Attendance | Ref. |
|---|---|---|---|---|---|---|---|---|
| Preliminary round | 17 July 2003 | 20:30 | Hamburger SV | Neutral | 1–2 | Bobic 37' | 12,100 | |

== UEFA Cup ==
UEFA Cup match details
| Round | Date | Time | Opponent | Venue | Result F–A | Scorers | Attendance | Ref. |
|---|---|---|---|---|---|---|---|---|
| First round, first leg | 24 September 2003 | 17:30 | Dyskobolia Grodzisk | Home | 0–0 | | 23,142 | |
| First round, second leg | 15 October 2003 | 17:30 | Dyskobolia Grodzisk | Away | 0–1 | | 4,200 | |
