= 2002–03 Hertha BSC season =

Hertha BSC
2002–03 season
- Manager: Huub Stevens
- Bundesliga: 5th
- UEFA Cup: Fourth round
- DFB-Pokal: First round
- DFB-Ligapokal: Winners
- Top goalscorer: Marcelinho (14)
Home colours	Away colours	Third colours

During the 2002–03 season, Hertha BSC competed in the Bundesliga.

== Season summary ==
After two successive eliminations in the UEFA Cup third round, Hertha went one better by reaching the round of 16, before elimination by eventual semi-finalists Boavista in away goals. Qualification for the UEFA Cup for the fourth time in a row was obtained with a 5th-placed finish.

== Players ==
=== First-team squad ===
Squad at end of season

Note: Flags indicate national team as defined under FIFA eligibility rules; some limited exceptions apply. Players may hold more than one non-FIFA nationality.

No.	Pos.	Nation	Player
1	GK	HUN	Gábor Király
2	DF	GER	Denis Lapaczinski
3	DF	GER	Arne Friedrich
4	DF	NED	Dick van Burik
6	DF	ISL	Eyjólfur Sverrisson
7	FW	BRA	Alex Alves
8	MF	BEL	Bart Goor
9	FW	BRA	Luizão
10	MF	BRA	Marcelinho
11	FW	GER	Michael Preetz
12	GK	GER	Christian Fiedler
13	MF	POL	Bartosz Karwan
14	DF	CRO	Josip Šimunić (Note: Šimunić was born in Canberra, Australia, but also qualified to represent Croatia and Bosnia and Herzegovina internationally through his parents and made his international debut for Croatia in November 2001.)
15	DF	BRA	Nenê
16	MF	GER	Roberto Pinto
17	FW	BIH	Sead Zilić (Note: Zilić was born in Prijepolje, SFR Yugoslavia (now Serbia, but at the time part of Yugoslavia and then Serbia and Montenegro), but also holds Bosnian and Slovenian citizenship.)

No.	Pos.	Nation	Player
18	MF	HUN	Pál Dárdai
19	MF	GER	Andreas Schmidt
20	MF	GER	Andreas Neuendorf
21	MF	GER	Michael Hartmann
22	MF	GER	Stefan Beinlich
23	MF	GER	René Tretschok
24	FW	ANG	Nando Rafael (Note: Rafael was born in Luanda, Angola, but was raised in the Netherlands from the age of 8, later gained German citizenship, and represented Germany at U-21 level before making his international debut for Angola in 2012.)
25	MF	NED	Rob Maas
27	MF	BUL	Aleksandar Mladenov
28	MF	MKD	Nderim Nexhipi
32	MF	GER	Thorben Marx
33	DF	GER	Marko Rehmer
35	MF	GER	Benjamin Köhler
39	DF	GER	Alexander Madlung
40	GK	POL	Tomasz Kuszczak
44	FW	CMR	Joël Tchami

=== Left club during season ===
Note: Flags indicate national team as defined under FIFA eligibility rules; some limited exceptions apply. Players may hold more than one non-FIFA nationality.

No. / Pos. / Nation / Player; 5 / DF / GRE / Kostas Konstantinidis (Note: Konstantinidis was born in Schorndorf, West Germany (now Germany), but also qualified to represent Greece internationally and made his international debut for Greece in 1995.) (to Hannover 96)	No. / Pos. / Nation / Player; 24 / FW / NOR / Trond Fredrik Ludvigsen (on loan to Rosenborg)
