= 2004–05 Hertha BSC season =

Hertha BSC
2004–05 season
- Head coach: Falko Götz
- Stadium: Olympiastadion
- Bundesliga: 4th
- DFB-Pokal: Second round
- Top goalscorer: League: Marcelinho (18); All: Marcelinho (19)
- Biggest win: Hertha BSC 6–0 Borussia Mönchengladbach
Home colours	Away colours

The 2004–05 season was the 113th season in the existence of Hertha BSC and the club's eighth consecutive season in the top flight of German football. In addition to the domestic league, Hertha BSC participated in this season's edition of the DFB-Pokal. The season covered the period from 1 July 2004 to 30 June 2005.

== Players ==
=== First-team squad ===
Squad at end of season

Note: Flags indicate national team as defined under FIFA eligibility rules; some limited exceptions apply. Players may hold more than one non-FIFA nationality.

No.	Pos.	Nation	Player
1	GK	GER	Gerhard Tremmel
3	DF	GER	Arne Friedrich
4	DF	NED	Dick van Burik
5	MF	CRO	Niko Kovač (Note: Kovač was born in West Berlin, West Germany (now Berlin, Germany), but also qualified to represent Croatia and Bosnia and Herzegovina internationally through his parents and made his international debut for Croatia in December 1996.)
7	MF	TUR	Yıldıray Baştürk (Note: Baştürk was born in Herne, West Germany, but also qualified to represent Turkey internationally and made his international debut for Turkey in 1998.)
8	MF	HUN	Pál Dárdai
10	MF	BRA	Marcelinho
11	DF	BRA	Gilberto
12	GK	GER	Christian Fiedler
13	FW	GER	Fredi Bobic (Note: Bobic was born in Maribor, Yugoslavia (now Slovenia), but also was raised in West Germany (now Germany) from a few months after birth and made his international debut for Germany in 1994.)
14	DF	CRO	Josip Šimunić (Note: Šimunić was born in Canberra, Australia, but also qualified to represent Croatia and Bosnia and Herzegovina internationally through his parents and made his international debut for Croatia in November 2001.)
15	FW	GER	Giuseppe Reina
16	MF	GER	Ashkan Dejagah (Note: Dejagah was born in Tehran, Iran, but was raised in Germany from the age of 1 and represented Germany at every youth level between U-17 and U-21 level. He was permitted to represent Iran internationally after a FIFA rule change in 2009 and made his international debut for Iran in February 2012.)
17	DF	GER	Alexander Madlung
18	FW	POL	Artur Wichniarek

No.	Pos.	Nation	Player
19	MF	GER	Andreas Schmidt
20	MF	GER	Andreas Neuendorf
22	DF	GER	Oliver Schröder
23	DF	DEN	Dennis Cagara (Note: Cagara was born in Glostrup, Denmark, and represented Denmark at U-16, U-17, U-18, U-19, U-20, and U-21 level, but also qualified to represent the Philippines internationally through his father and made his international debut for the Philippines in October 2011.)
24	FW	ANG	Nando Rafael (Note: Rafael was born in Luanda, Angola, but was raised in the Netherlands from the age of 8, later gained German citizenship, and represented Germany at U-21 level before making his international debut for Angola in 2012.)
25	MF	GER	Alexander Ludwig
26	FW	TUR	İlhan Mansız (Note: Mansız was born in Kempten, West Germany (now Germany), but also qualified to represent Turkey internationally and made his debut for Turkey in October 2001.)
28	DF	GER	Sofian Chahed (Note: Chahed was born in West Berlin, West Germany (now Berlin, Germany), and represented Germany at U-19 and U-20 level, but also qualified to represent Tunisia internationally and made his debut for Tunisia in October 2009.)
29	DF	GER	Malik Fathi
32	MF	GER	Thorben Marx
33	DF	GER	Marko Rehmer
34	MF	BIH	Sejad Salihović
36	DF	GER	Pascal Bieler
37	MF	GER	Christian Müller
39	GK	GER	Nourreddine Semghoun

=== Left club during season ===
Note: Flags indicate national team as defined under FIFA eligibility rules; some limited exceptions apply. Players may hold more than one non-FIFA nationality.

No. / Pos. / Nation / Player; 21 / MF / GER / Michael Hartmann (to Hansa Rostock)	No. / Pos. / Nation / Player; 27 / MF / BUL / Aleksandar Mladenov (on loan to Karlsruhe)

=== Hertha BSC II ===
Note: Flags indicate national team as defined under FIFA eligibility rules; some limited exceptions apply. Players may hold more than one non-FIFA nationality.

No.	Pos.	Nation	Player
—	MF	GER	René Tretschok

== Competitions ==
=== Overall record ===
Competition	First match	Last match	Starting round	Final position	Record							
Competition	First match	Last match	Starting round	Final position	Pld	W	D	L	GF	GA	GD	Win %
Bundesliga	7 August 2004	21 May 2005	Matchday 1	4th	34	15	13	6	59	31	+28	44.12
DFB-Pokal	22 August 2004	22 September 2004	First round	Second round	2	1	0	1	3	3	+0	50.00
Total					36	16	13	7	62	34	+28	44.44

Source: Competitions

=== Bundesliga ===
==== League table ====
Pos	Team	Pld	W	D	L	GF	GA	GD	Pts	Qualification or relegation
2	Schalke 04	34	20	3	11	56	46	+10	63	Qualification to Champions League group stage
3	Werder Bremen	34	18	5	11	68	37	+31	59	Qualification to Champions League third qualifying round
4	Hertha BSC	34	15	13	6	59	31	+28	58	Qualification to UEFA Cup first round (Note: Since DFB Cup winners Bayern Munich and finalists Schalke 04 both qualified for the Champions League, the UEFA Cup place for the cup-winners was given to 6th placed Bayer Leverkusen.)
5	VfB Stuttgart	34	17	7	10	54	40	+14	58	Qualification to UEFA Cup first round
6	Bayer Leverkusen	34	16	9	9	65	44	+21	57	Qualification to UEFA Cup first round

Rules for classification: 1) points; 2) goal difference; 3) number of goals scored.

==== Results summary ====
Overall								Home						Away					
Pld	W	D	L	GF	GA	GD	Pts	W	D	L	GF	GA	GD	W	D	L	GF	GA	GD
34	15	13	6	59	31	+28	58	8	8	1	34	13	+21	7	5	5	25	18	+7

Source: DFB

==== Results by round ====
Round	1	2	3	4	5	6	7	8	9	10	11	12	13	14	15	16	17	18	19	20	21	22	23	24	25	26	27	28	29	30	31	32	33	34
Ground	H	A	H	A	H	A	A	H	A	H	A	H	A	H	A	H	A	A	H	A	H	A	H	H	A	H	A	H	A	H	A	H	A	H
Result	D	D	D	D	D	L	W	W	L	L	W	D	W	D	W	W	W	D	D	W	W	L	W	W	D	W	L	W	W	W	L	W	D	D
Position	8	13	13	12	14	16	8	7	10	11	9	11	10	9	9	7	6	5	7	5	4	7	4	5	6	5	5	5	5	4	5	4	4	4

Source: DFB
A = Away; H = Home; W = Win; D = Draw; L = Loss

==== Matches ====
7 August 2004 1	Hertha BSC	2–2	VfL Bochum	Berlin
CEST (UTC+2)				Stadium: Olympiastadion

14 August 2004 2	Bayern Munich	1–1	Hertha BSC
CEST (UTC+2)

28 August 2004 3	Hertha BSC	1–1	Mainz 05	Berlin
CEST (UTC+2)				Stadium: Olympiastadion

11 September 2004 4	1. FC Nürnberg	0–0	Hertha BSC
CEST (UTC+2)

19 September 2004 5	Hertha BSC	0–0	VfB Stuttgart	Berlin
CEST (UTC+2)				Stadium: Olympiastadion

26 September 2004 6	Hamburger SV	2–1	Hertha BSC
CEST (UTC+2)

2 October 2004 7	1. FC Kaiserslautern	0–2	Hertha BSC
CEST (UTC+2)

16 October 2004 8	Hertha BSC	3–1	Bayer Leverkusen	Berlin
CEST (UTC+2)				Stadium: Olympiastadion

23 October 2004 9	Arminia Bielefeld	1–0	Hertha BSC
CEST (UTC+2)

26 October 2004 10	Hertha BSC	0–1	Borussia Dortmund	Berlin
CEST (UTC+2)				Stadium: Olympiastadion

30 October 2004 11	SC Freiburg	1–3	Hertha BSC
CEST (UTC+2)

6 November 2004 12	Hertha BSC	1–1	Werder Bremen	Berlin
CEST (UTC+2)				Stadium: Olympiastadion

13 November 2004 13	Schalke 04	1–3	Hertha BSC
CEST (UTC+2)

20 November 2004 14	Hertha BSC	1–1	Hansa Rostock	Berlin
CEST (UTC+2)				Stadium: Olympiastadion

27 November 2004 15	VfL Wolfsburg	2–3	Hertha BSC
CEST (UTC+2)

4 December 2004 16	Hertha BSC	6–0	Borussia Mönchengladbach	Berlin
CEST (UTC+2)				Stadium: Olympiastadion

11 December 2004 17	Hannover 96	0–1	Hertha BSC
CEST (UTC+2)

23 January 2005 18	VfL Bochum	2–2	Hertha BSC
CEST (UTC+2)

30 January 2005 19	Hertha BSC	0–0	Bayern Munich	Berlin
CEST (UTC+2)				Stadium: Olympiastadion

5 February 2005 20	Mainz 05	0–3	Hertha BSC
CEST (UTC+2)

12 February 2005 21	Hertha BSC	2–1	1. FC Nürnberg	Berlin
CEST (UTC+2)				Stadium: Olympiastadion

20 February 2005 22	VfB Stuttgart	1–0	Hertha BSC
CEST (UTC+2)

26 February 2005 23	Hertha BSC	4–1	Hamburger SV	Berlin
CEST (UTC+2)				Stadium: Olympiastadion

6 March 2005 24	Hertha BSC	1–1	1. FC Kaiserslautern	Berlin
CEST (UTC+2)				Stadium: Olympiastadion

12 March 2005 25	Bayer Leverkusen	3–3	Hertha BSC
CEST (UTC+2)

19 March 2005 26	Hertha BSC	3–0	Arminia Bielefeld	Berlin
CEST (UTC+2)				Stadium: Olympiastadion

3 April 2005 27	Borussia Dortmund	2–1	Hertha BSC
CEST (UTC+2)

9 April 2005 28	Hertha BSC	3–1	SC Freiburg	Berlin
CEST (UTC+2)				Stadium: Olympiastadion

16 April 2005 29	Werder Bremen	0–1	Hertha BSC
CEST (UTC+2)

23 April 2005 30	Hertha BSC	4–1	Schalke 04	Berlin
CEST (UTC+2)				Stadium: Olympiastadion

30 April 2005 31	Hansa Rostock	2–1	Hertha BSC
CEST (UTC+2)

7 May 2005 32	Hertha BSC	3–1	VfL Wolfsburg	Berlin
CEST (UTC+2)				Stadium: Olympiastadion

14 May 2005 33	Borussia Mönchengladbach	0–0	Hertha BSC
CEST (UTC+2)

21 May 2005 34	Hertha BSC	0–0	Hannover 96	Berlin
CEST (UTC+2)				Stadium: Olympiastadion

=== DFB-Pokal ===
22 August 2004 First round	TSV 1946 Aindling	0–1	Hertha BSC	Aindling
15:00 CEST (UTC+2)			Neuendorf 86'	Stadium: Stadion am Schüsselhauser Kreuz; Attendance: 5,200; Referee: Lutz Wagner

22 September 2004 Second round	Eintracht Braunschweig	3–2	Hertha BSC	Braunschweig
19:00 CEST (UTC+2)	Graf 60'; Grimm 74'; Madlung 80' (o.g.)		Marcelinho 58'; Neuendorf 78'	Stadium: Stadion an der Hamburger Straße; Attendance: 20,000; Referee: Peter Sippel

== Statistics ==
=== Goalscorers ===
Rank	No.	Pos	Nat	Name	Bundesliga	DFB-Pokal	Total
1	10	MF	(Brazil)	Marcelinho	18	1	19
2	7	MF	(Turkey)	Yıldıray Baştürk	7	0	7
3	24	FW	(Angola)	Nando Rafael	6	0	6
3	11	MF	(Brazil)	Gilberto	6	0	6
5	5	MF	(Croatia)	Niko Kovač	4	0	4
5	17	DF	(Germany)	Alexander Madlung	4	0	4
Totals					59	3	62
