= Malik Fathi =

German footballer (born 1983)

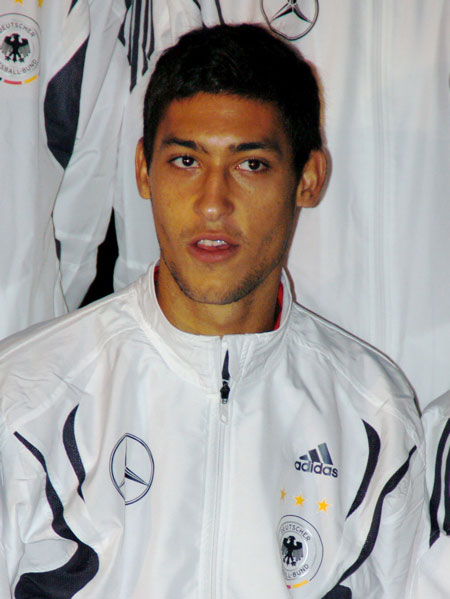
- Fathi in 2006

Personal information
- Full name: Malik Deniz Fathi
- Date of birth: 29 October 1983 (age 43)
- Place of birth: West Berlin, West Germany
- Height: 1.85 m (6 ft 1 in)
- Position: Left-back

Youth career
- 1993–2000: Hertha Zehlendorf
- 2000–2001: Tennis Borussia Berlin
- 2001–2003: Hertha BSC

Senior career*
Years	Team	Apps	(Gls)
2003–2008	Hertha BSC	123	(2)
2004–2007	Hertha BSC II	3	(0)
2008–2011	Spartak Moscow	36	(6)
2010–2011	→ Mainz 05 (loan)	33	(1)
2010	→ Mainz 05 II (loan)	2	(0)
2011–2014	Mainz 05	19	(0)
2011–2014	Mainz 05 II	11	(0)
2012	→ Kayserispor (loan)	16	(0)
2013	→ 1860 Munich (loan)	15	(0)
2015–2018	Atlético Baleares	96	(3)
Total		354	(12)

International career
2002	Germany U19	8	(0)
2002–2003	Germany U20	11	(0)
2004–2006	Germany U21	18	(2)
2006	Germany	2	(0)
- * Club domestic league appearances and goals

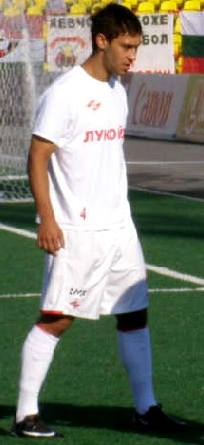
Fathi warming up for FC Spartak Moscow

Malik Deniz Fathi (born 29 October 1983) is a German former professional footballer who played as a left-back.

== Club career ==
From 2003 to 2008 he played as a defender for Hertha BSC.

On 12 March 2008, he signed for Spartak Moscow. In January 2010, he was loaned to 1. FSV Mainz 05. This move was made permanent in July 2011. He was loaned to Kayserispor for the 2012–13 season, but at the end of the winter transfer window of 2012–13, he joined TSV 1860 Munich on a half-season loan.

On 14 April 2014, it was announced that his expiring contract at Mainz 05 would not be extended. On 30 January 2015 he moved to Spanish Segunda División B club Atlético Baleares. Fathi played almost 100 league matches in the third highest level of the Spanish football pyramid.

== International career ==
Fathi represented Germany Under-20 team at the 2003 FIFA World Youth Championship, Germany Under-21 team at European under-21 championship 2006.

He earned his first cap for the Germany national team on 16 August 2006 in a 3–0 home friendly win against Sweden. He replaced Marcell Jansen at half-time. In his second and last international, he replaced Thomas Hitzlsperger against Georgia for the final 15 minutes of a 2-0 friendly win in Rostock.

== Personal life ==
Before beginning his football career he played tennis for Hertha Zehlendorf Berlin and for Borussia Berlin. He also plays basketball in his spare time.

== Career statistics ==
Appearances and goals by club, season and competition
Club	Season	League			Cup		Continental		Other		Total		Ref.
Club	Season	Division	Apps	Goals	Apps	Goals	Apps	Goals	Apps	Goals	Apps	Goals	Ref.
Hertha BSC	2003–04	Bundesliga	14	0	0	0	0	0	0 (Note: Appearances in DFB-Ligapokal)	0	14	0	
Hertha BSC	2004–05	Bundesliga	30	0	1	0	—		—		31	0	
Hertha BSC	2005–06	Bundesliga	26	0	3	1	8	0	1	0	38	1	
Hertha BSC	2006–07	Bundesliga	31	1	4	1	5	0	1	0	41	2	
Hertha BSC	2007–08	Bundesliga	22	1	2	1	—		—		24	2	
Hertha BSC	Total		123	2	10	3	13	0	2	0	148	5	—
Hertha BSC II	2004–05	Regionalliga Nord	1	0	1	0	—		—		2	0	
Hertha BSC II	2006–07	Regionalliga Nord	2	0	—		—		—		2	0	
Hertha BSC II	Total		3	0	1	0	0	0	0	0	4	0	—
Spartak Moscow	2008	Premier League	21	3	1	0	6	1	—		28	4	
Spartak Moscow	2009	Premier League	15	3	1	0	0	0	—		16	3	
Spartak Moscow	Total		36	6	2	0	6	1	0	0	44	7	—
Mainz 05 (loan)	2009–10	Bundesliga	14	1	0	0	—		—		14	1	
Mainz 05 (loan)	2010–11	Bundesliga	19	0	1	0	—		—		20	0	
Mainz 05 (loan)	Total		33	1	1	0	0	0	0	0	34	1	—
Mainz 05 II (loan)	2010–11	Regionalliga West	2	0	—		—		—		2	0	
Mainz 05	2011–12	Bundesliga	17	0	3	0	0	0	—		20	0	
Mainz 05	2013–14	Bundesliga	2	0	0	0	—		—		2	0	
Mainz 05	Total		19	0	3	0	0	0	0	0	22	0	—
Mainz 05 II	2011–12	Regionalliga West	3	0	—		—		—		3	0	
Mainz 05 II	2013–14	Regionalliga West	8	0	—		—		—		8	0	
Mainz 05 II	Total		11	0	0	0	0	0	0	0	11	0	—
Kayserispor (loan)	2012–13	Süper Lig	16	0	1	0	—		—		17	0	
1860 Munich (loan)	2012–13	2. Bundesliga	15	0	0	0	—		—		15	0	
Atlético Baleares	2014–15	Segunda División B	8	0	—		—		—		8	0	
Atlético Baleares	2015–16	Segunda División B	31	1	—		—		—		31	1	
Atlético Baleares	2016–17	Segunda División B	29	1	—		—		4 (Note: Appearances in promotion play-offs)	1	33	2	
Atlético Baleares	2016–17	Segunda División B	28	1	1	0	—		—		29	1	
Atlético Baleares	Total		96	3	1	0	0	0	4	1	101	4	—
Career total			354	12	19	3	19	1	6	1	398	17	—
