= Christian Fiedler =

German footballer (born 1975)

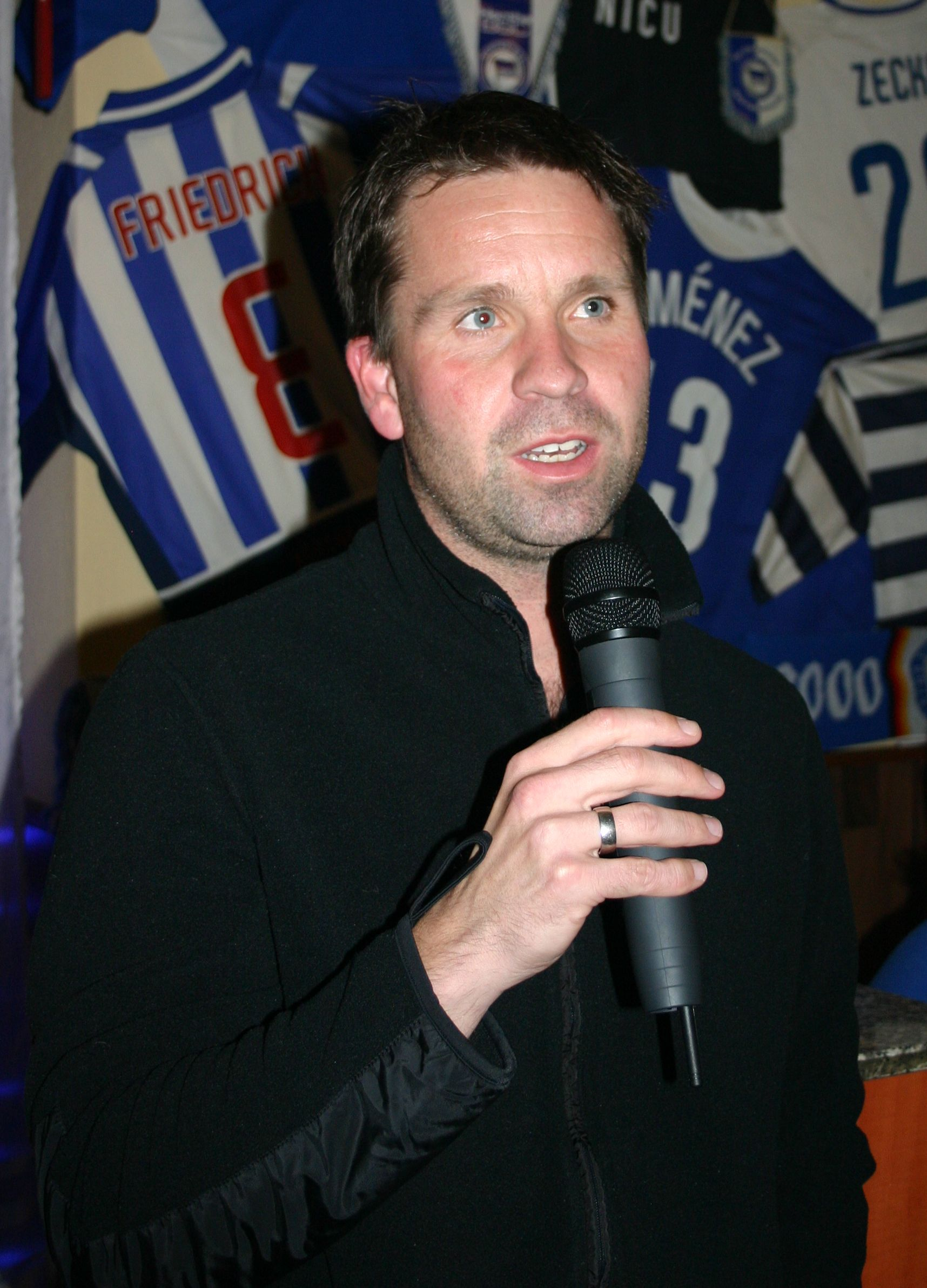

Personal information
- Date of birth: 27 March 1975 (age 51)
- Place of birth: West Berlin, West Germany
- Height: 1.80 m (5 ft 11 in)
- Position: Goalkeeper

Team information
- Current team: Greuther Fürth (goalkeeper coach)

Youth career
- 1982–1990: Lichtenrader BC 92
- 1990–1992: Hertha BSC

Senior career*
Years	Team	Apps	(Gls)
1992–1994	Hertha BSC II		
1994–2009	Hertha BSC	234	(0)

International career
1995–1998	Germany U21	16	(0)

Managerial career
- 2009–2013: Hertha BSC (goalkeeper coach)
- 2013–2015: Germany U17 (goalkeeper coach)
- 2015–: Greuther Fürth (goalkeeper coach)
- * Club domestic league appearances and goals

Christian Fiedler (born 27 March 1975) is a German football coach and former player who is goalkeeper coach at Greuther Fürth. A goalkeeper, he spent his entire playing career with Hertha BSC.

== Career ==
Fiedler was born in Berlin. He led Hertha BSC's amateurs to the 1993 Cup final, losing to a lone Ulf Kirsten strike, 15 minutes from time. He started his professional career in the second division, helping the side promote in 1996–97.

For most of his topflight career, however, he was only second-choice to Hertha, successively to Gábor Király and Jaroslav Drobný; his best years came in 2004–07, before the Czech's arrival.

On 2 August 2008, in a test match against Newcastle United, Fiedler sustained a serious injury, which ultimately forced him to retire at the end of the 2008–09 season. On 1 July 2009, he began working as goalkeeper coach for Hertha, having totalled 234 matches (both major divisions combined).

== Career statistics ==
Appearances and goals by club, season and competition
Club	Season	League			Cup		League Cup		Europe		Total	
Club	Season	Division	Apps	Goals	Apps	Goals	Apps	Goals	Apps	Goals	Apps	Goals
Hertha BSC	1993–94	2. Bundesliga	0	0	0	0	—		—		0	0
Hertha BSC	1994–95	2. Bundesliga	29	0	0	0	—		—		29	0
Hertha BSC	1995–96	2. Bundesliga	34	0	2	0	—		—		36	0
Hertha BSC	1996–97	2. Bundesliga	34	0	2	0	—		—		36	0
Hertha BSC	1997–98	Bundesliga	7	0	1	0	—		—		8	0
Hertha BSC	1998–99	Bundesliga	0	0	0	0	—		—		0	0
Hertha BSC	1999–2000	Bundesliga	7	0	0	0	1	0	2	0	10	0
Hertha BSC	2000–01	Bundesliga	0	0	0	0	0	0	0	0	0	0
Hertha BSC	2001–02	Bundesliga	10	0	3	0	0	0	2	0	15	0
Hertha BSC	2002–03	Bundesliga	1	0	0	0	1	0	0	0	2	0
Hertha BSC	2003–04	Bundesliga	17	0	0	0	0	0	0	0	17	0
Hertha BSC	2004–05	Bundesliga	34	0	2	0	—		—		36	0
Hertha BSC	2005–06	Bundesliga	29	0	2	0	0	0	8	0	39	0
Hertha BSC	2006–07	Bundesliga	32	0	4	0	1	0	6	0	43	0
Hertha BSC	2007–08	Bundesliga	0	0	0	0	—		—		0	0
Hertha BSC	2008–09	Bundesliga	0	0	0	0	—		0	0	0	0
Career total			234	0	16	0	3	0	18	0	271	0

== Honours ==
Hertha BSC

- DFL-Ligapokal: 2001, 2002

== See also ==
- List of one-club men
