= Thorben Marx =

German footballer (born 1981)

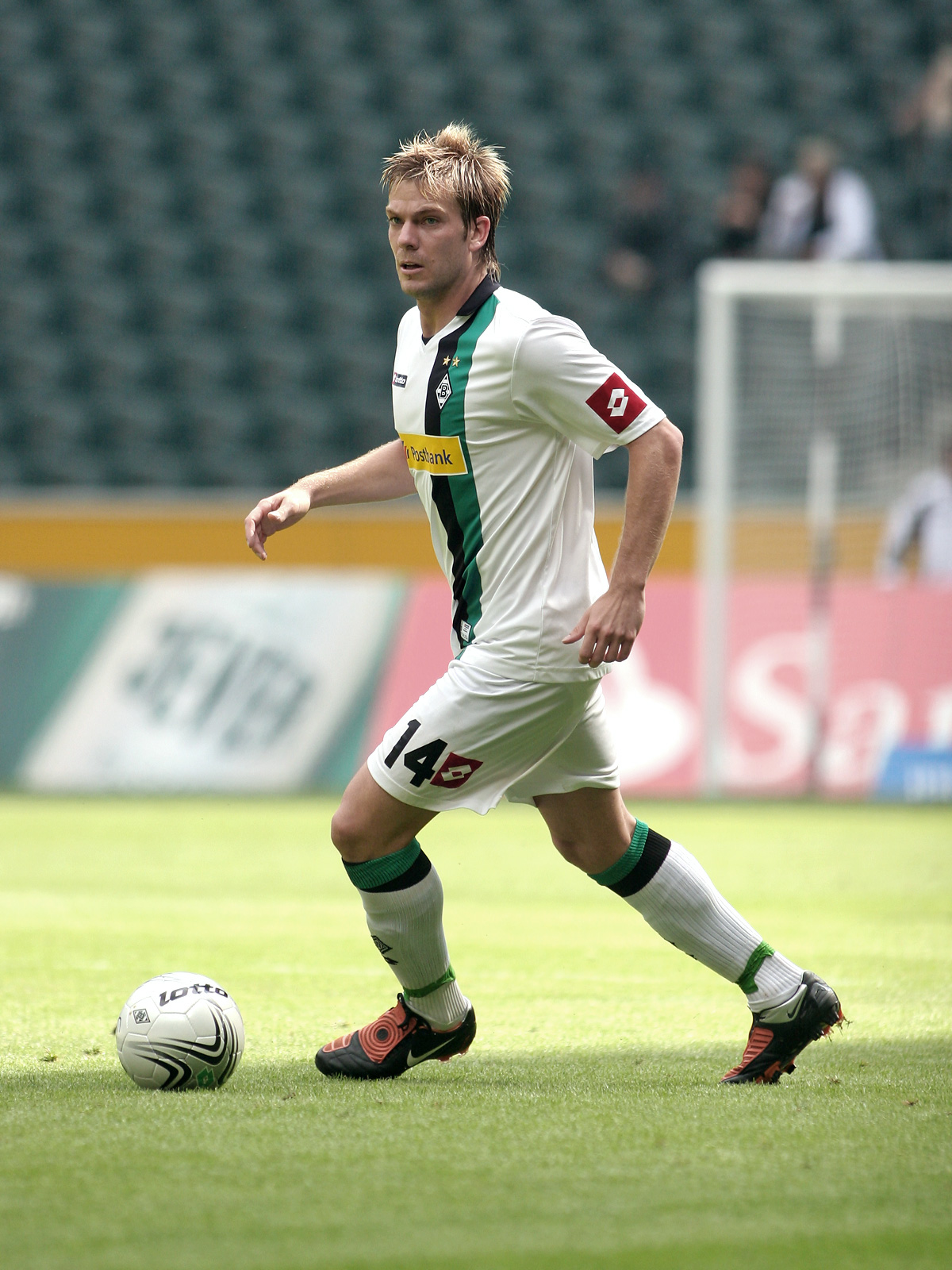
- Marx playing for Borussia Mönchengladbach in 2009

Personal information
- Date of birth: 1 June 1981 (age 45)
- Place of birth: Berlin, West Germany
- Height: 1.84 m (6 ft 0 in)
- Position: Midfielder

Youth career
- –1994: FC Stern Marienfelde
- 1994–1998: Hertha Zehlendorf
- 1998–2000: Hertha BSC

Senior career*
Years	Team	Apps	(Gls)
2000–2006	Hertha BSC II	59	(12)
2000–2006	Hertha BSC	79	(6)
2006–2009	Arminia Bielefeld	77	(2)
2009–2015	Borussia Mönchengladbach	99	(3)
Total		314	(23)

International career
1997	Germany U16		
2002–2003	Germany U21	14	(0)
2004–2005	Germany Team 2006	3	(1)
- * Club domestic league appearances and goals

Thorben Marx (born 1 June 1981) is a German professional football coach and former player who is currently a coach at BFC Preussen. As a player, he operated primarily in midfield and played for Hertha BSC, Arminia Bielefeld and Borussia Mönchengladbach.

== Club career ==
=== Hertha BSC ===
Born in Berlin, Marx started to play youth football for FC Stern Marienfelde from age 5, before joining Hertha Zehlendorf in 1994 and by age 15, was captain of the club's B team in the Landesliga. Despite interest in signing Marx from FC Bayern Munich, Hamburger SV, Borussia Dortmund and Borussia Mönchengladbach, Marx transferred to Hertha BSC in 1998. Marx suffered an cruciate ligament injury shortly after signing for the club, though Hertha paid €5,000 for Marx's operation and he began training with the first team after recovering. Marx made his Bundesliga debut on 25 November 2000 as an 88th-minute substitute in a 4–0 win over Eintracht Frankfurt.

In April 2001, it was announced that Marx had agreed his first professional contract with Hertha BSC, valid from 1 July 2001 for three years. Following the appointment of Falko Götz as interim manager in February 2002, he began to have regular involvement in first team matches, making 12 appearances, in which he scored once and provided two assists between February 2002 and the end of the 2001–02 season.

Marx retained his place in the Hertha team for the 2002–03 season, starting the first four Bundesliga matches of the season and making 13 appearances in total during the first half of the season. In March 2003, Marx was pulled over by police due to speeding and undertook a drug test, which initially showed positive for cocaine use, though a blood test later cleared him of it. He kept his place in the team for the away match against 1. FC Nürnberg that weekend, and scored his first goal of the season, with a volley, in a 3–0 victory. He made 26 appearances in total across the 2002–03 season.

After starting the first five Bundesliga matches of the 2003–04 season, Marx suffered a cruciate ligament rupture in a match against Hannover 96 on 13 September 2003, for which he underwent surgery. He failed to play for Hertha again that season. He missed much of pre-season for the 2004–05 season, but started Hertha's opening game of the season, a 2–2 draw against VfL Bochum, nonetheless and made 26 appearances in the Bundesliga that season. Der Tagesspiegel journalist Stefan Hermanns described the season as, at best, a transitional season in Marx's development, and that he failed to improve from his standard of performance prior to his injury. He lost his place as a regular player for Hertha during the 2005–06 season, playing just 8 times in the Bundesliga, and left the club at the end of his contract in summer 2006 amidst financial difficulties at the club.

=== Arminia Bielefeld ===
On 12 May 2006, it was announced that Marx would join fellow Bundesliga club Arminia Bielefeld on a free transfer. He signed a three-year contract with the club. He made 26 Bundesliga appearances across the 2006–07 season.

He made his first appearance of the 2007–08 season starting in an 8–1 defeat to Werder Bremen in the 8th match on 29 September 2007, and appeared in 9 Bundesliga matches prior to the winter break, but appeared in all but one of the club's matches in the second half of the season, as the club finished 15th and avoided relegation on the final day of the season.

He made 27 appearances for Arminia Bielefeld across the 2008–09 season, as Bielefeld were relegated from the Bundesliga after finishing bottom. Following relegation, Marx told the club he would not extend his contract and he was released.

=== Borussia Mönchengladbach ===
In June 2009, Marx signed for Borussia Mönchengladbach on a two-year contract. Marx made his debut for the club on 1 August 2009 in a 2–1 DFB-Pokal win over FSV Frankfurt, and started every Bundesliga match for the club up to suffering a thigh injury in February 2010. He made 28 Bundesliga appearances total across the 2009–10 season. Marx scored his first goal for Gladbach on 2 October 2010 with a header in a 1–1 draw against VfL Wolfsburg. He started every match in the first half of the 2010–11 season bar two, having been injured for one and suspended for the other, but started just three matches in the second half of the season, after Lucien Favre was appointed as manager in February 2011.

Marx started 7 Bundesliga matches and made 12 substitute appearances during the 2011–12 season. Marx had an operation on his meniscus in April 2012, which left him unavailable for the rest of the season. He made his first appearance of the 2012–13 season on 7 October, starting as a defensive midfielder alongside Lukas Rupp, as Gladbach defeated Eintracht Frankfurt 2–0. Marx kept his place in the team, starting every game up until the winter break, and was credited with improving the sides defensive performances. In January 2013, his contract with the club was extended until summer 2015. He made 23 Bundesliga appearances in total over the 2012–13 season.

Marx made his first appearance of the 2013–14 season as a makeshift centre back - he was substituted on in a 4–1 victory over Eintracht Frankfurt in October for the injured Roel Brouwers. He made just one further appearance that season, again as a substitute, against Borussia Dortmund in March. He announced in December 2014 that he planned to retire at the end of the season when his contract would expire, which he did, having failed to make an appearance during the 2014–15 season, and took up an internship in an off-the-pitch role at Mönchengladbach.

== International career ==
He was part of the Germany national under-16 squad for the 1997 UEFA European Under-16 Championship, having played regularly for the team since being scouted at a tournament in 1995. He later made 13 appearances for the Germany under-21 team, and three appearances for "Team 2006", a secondary German national team set up prior to the 2006 FIFA World Cup.

== Coaching career ==
In April 2021, Marx was appointed as a coach at BFC Preussen.

== Style of play ==
Marx played mainly as a central midfielder. He was described as "hard working, a team player, composed and robust" (German: fleißig, mannschaftsdienlich, abgeklärt und robust) by Karsten Kellermann of Rheinische Post.

== Career statistics ==
Appearances and goals by club, season and competition
Club	Season	League			DFB-Pokal		Other		Total	
Club	Season	Division	Apps	Goals	Apps	Goals	Apps	Goals	Apps	Goals
Hertha BSC	2000–01	Bundesliga	1	0	0	0	0	0	1	0
Hertha BSC	2001–02	Bundesliga	13	1	1	0	1 (Note: Appearance(s) in DFL-Ligapokal)	0	14	1
Hertha BSC	2002–03	Bundesliga	26	2	0	0	8 (Note: 3 appearances in DFL-Ligapokal, 5 appearances in UEFA Cup.)	0	34	2
Hertha BSC	2003–04	Bundesliga	5	0	1	0	1	0	7	0
Hertha BSC	2004–05	Bundesliga	26	3	2	0	0	0	28	3
Hertha BSC	2005–06	Bundesliga	8	0	3	1	4 (Note: 1 appearance in DFL-Ligapokal, 3 appearances in UEFA Cup.)	0	15	1
Hertha BSC	Total		79	6	7	1	14	0	100	7
Hertha BSC II	2004–05	Regionalliga Nord	4	1	—		0	0	4	1
Hertha BSC II	2005–06	Regionalliga Nord	6	0	—		0	0	6	0
Hertha BSC II	Total		10	1	0	0	0	0	10	1
Arminia Bielefeld	2006–07	Bundesliga	26	0	1	0	0	0	27	0
Arminia Bielefeld	2007–08	Bundesliga	24	1	2	0	0	0	26	1
Arminia Bielefeld	2008–09	Bundesliga	27	1	2	0	0	0	29	1
Arminia Bielefeld	Total		77	2	5	0	0	0	82	2
Borussia Mönchengladbach	2009–10	Bundesliga	28	0	1	0	0	0	29	0
Borussia Mönchengladbach	2010–11	Bundesliga	27	1	3	0	0	0	30	1
Borussia Mönchengladbach	2011–12	Bundesliga	19	0	3	0	0	0	22	0
Borussia Mönchengladbach	2012–13	Bundesliga	23	2	1	0	6 (Note: Appearance(s) in UEFA Europa League)	1	30	3
Borussia Mönchengladbach	2013–14	Bundesliga	2	0	0	0	0	0	2	0
Borussia Mönchengladbach	Total		99	3	8	0	6	1	113	4
Career total			265	12	20	1	20	1	305	14

== Honours ==
Hertha BSC

- DFL-Ligapokal: 2001, 2002
