= Arne Friedrich =

German footballer (born 1979)

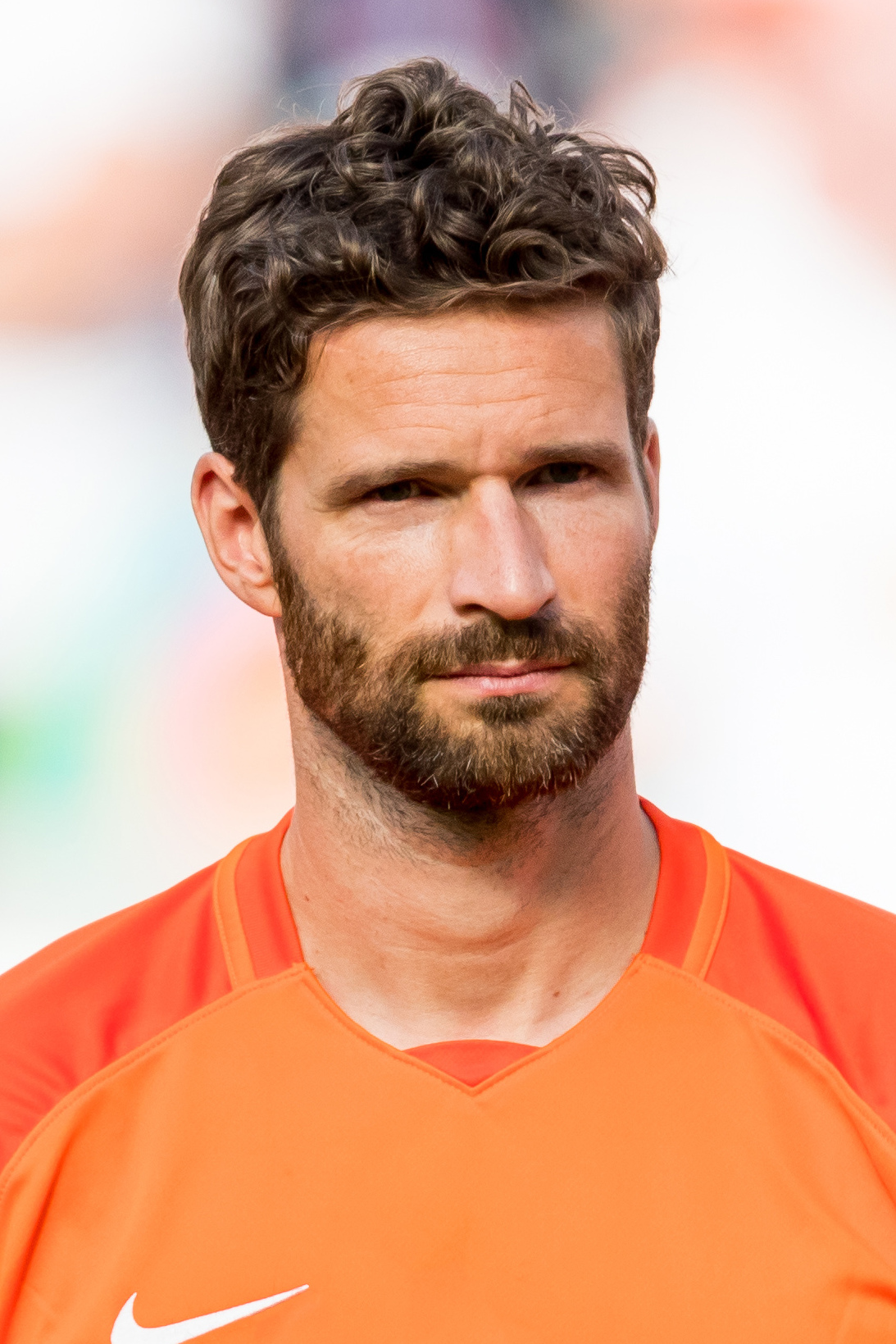
- Friedrich in a charity match in 2019

Personal information
- Full name: Arne Friedrich
- Date of birth: 29 May 1979 (age 47)
- Place of birth: Bad Oeynhausen, West Germany
- Height: 1.85 m (6 ft 1 in)
- Position: Defender

Team information
- Current team: Hertha BSC (sporting director)

Youth career
- 1985–1987: FC Bad Oeynhausen
- 1987–1992: TuS Lohe
- 1992–1995: SC Herford
- 1995–1999: FC Gütersloh

Senior career*
Years	Team	Apps	(Gls)
1999–2000	SC Verl	31	(0)
2000–2002	Arminia Bielefeld	47	(1)
2002–2010	Hertha BSC	231	(13)
2010–2011	VfL Wolfsburg	15	(0)
2012–2013	Chicago Fire	23	(1)
Total		347	(15)

International career
2000–2001	Germany U21	5	(0)
2002	Germany Team 2006	1	(0)
2002–2011	Germany	82	(1)

Managerial career
- 2014–2015: Germany U18 (assistant)
Medal record
Men's Football
Representing Germany
FIFA World Cup
Bronze medal – third place	2006 Germany
Bronze medal – third place	2010 South Africa
UEFA European Championship
Runner-up	2008 Austria–Switzerland
- * Club domestic league appearances and goals

Arne Friedrich (born 29 May 1979) is a German football executive and former player who played as a defender. He formerly was the sporting director of Hertha BSC.

He played 82 times for the Germany national team.

Friedrich was a very versatile player, playing full-back, centre-back and occasionally a midfield position. He represented his country on 82 occasions, scoring once. He participated in Euro 2004, World Cup 2006, Euro 2008 and the World Cup 2010.

== Club career ==
=== Arminia Bielefeld ===
In the 2000–01 season, Friedrich signed his first professional contract. Hermann Gerland, head coach of Arminia Bielefeld at the time, scouted Friedrich while playing for Regionalliga club SC Verl. Because of his convincing performance, Gerland decided to bring Friedrich to Bielefeld, where he immediately became a regular starter.

=== Hertha BSC ===
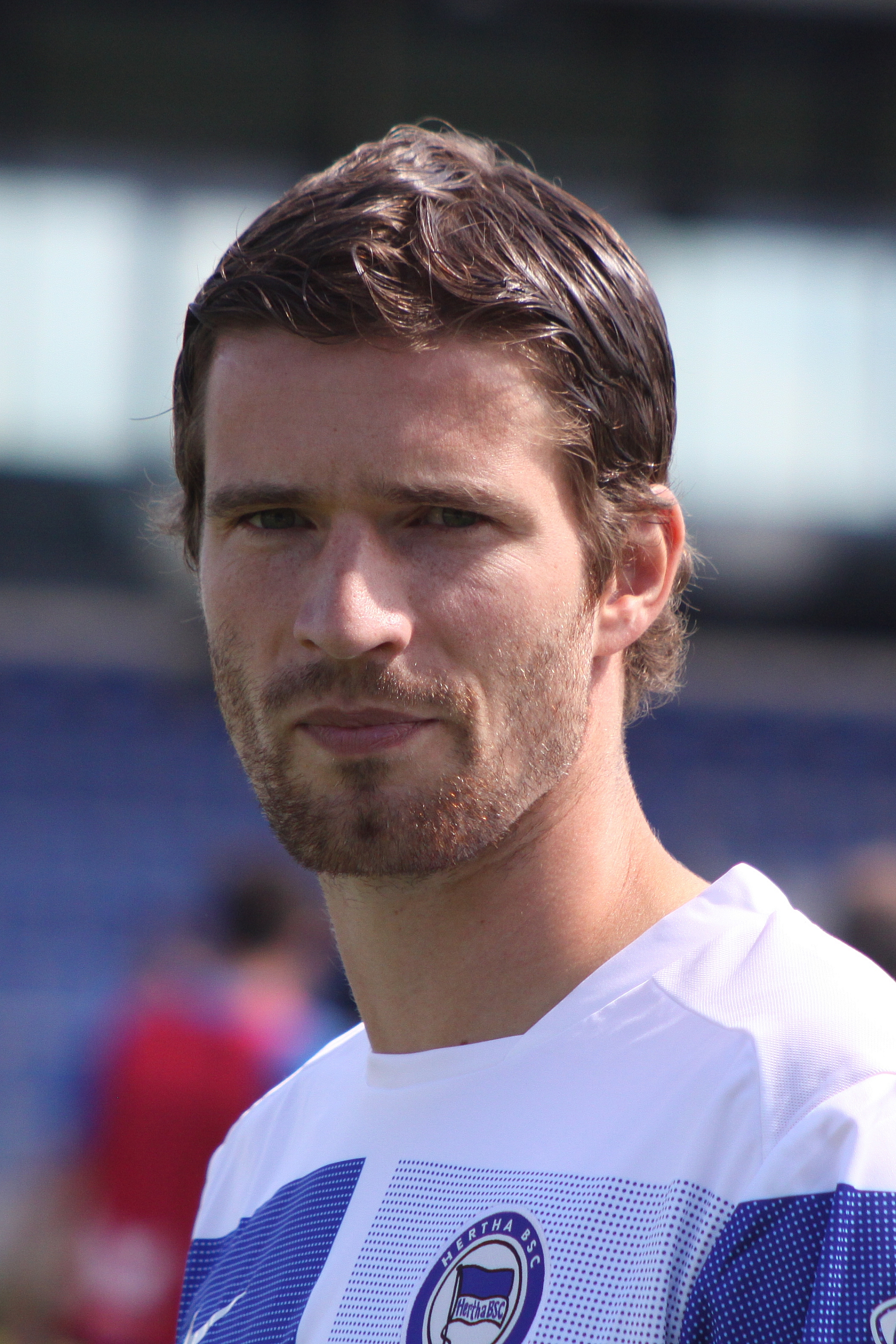
Friedrich with Hertha BSC in 2009

In 2002, Friedrich accepted an offer from Hertha BSC. With the Berlin club, he won the DFB-Ligapokal that year, defeating Bayern Munich, Borussia Dortmund and Schalke 04.

In 2004–05, Falko Götz named Friedrich captain, a role he kept for the remainder of his time at Hertha. He renewed his contract with Hertha twice which was due to run until 2012 with a performance-based option for an additional year. He made 231 matches in the German top-flight for the club from the capital.

=== VfL Wolfsburg ===
However, after Hertha's relegation in 2010, Friedrich left the club in a €2 million transfer to VfL Wolfsburg, signing a three-year contract.

On 19 September 2011, he was released from his contract at Wolfsburg due to long term injury.

=== Chicago Fire ===
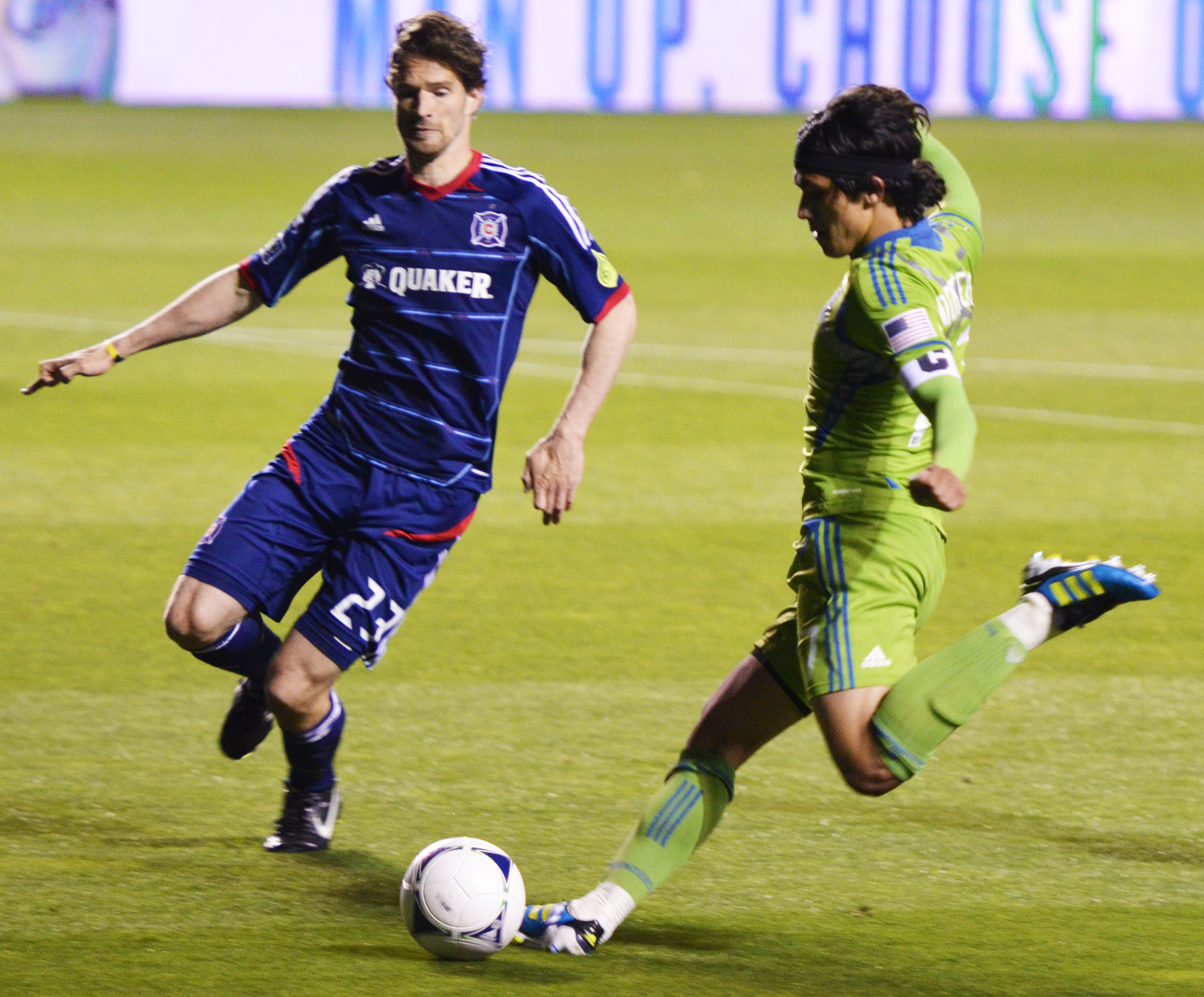
Friedrich (left) playing for Chicago Fire

In March 2012, Friedrich signed with the Chicago Fire of Major League Soccer. He made his competitive debut for the club in a match against the Houston Dynamo on 16 April 2012. The game ended in a 1–1 draw. Friedrich scored his first MLS goal on 12 August 2012 in a match against Philadelphia Union. Friedrich was named the club's 2012 season's Defender of the Year. At the end of 2012 season, he extended his contract with Chicago Fire until the end of 2013.

As announced on 21 January 2013, Friedrich became a US permanent resident which allowed him to no longer occupy an international slot while playing for Major League Soccer clubs. Due to recurring injuries, Friedrich did not appear in any matches in 2013.

On 23 June 2013, Friedrich announced his retirement from professional football.

== International career ==
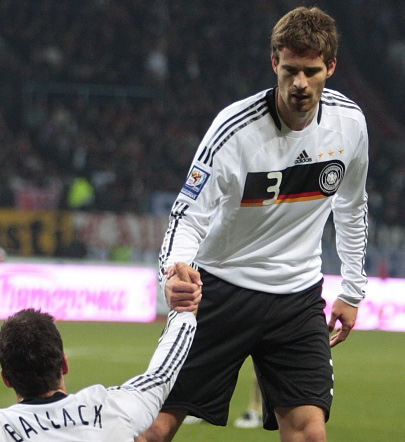
Friedrich and Michael Ballack playing for Germany in 2009

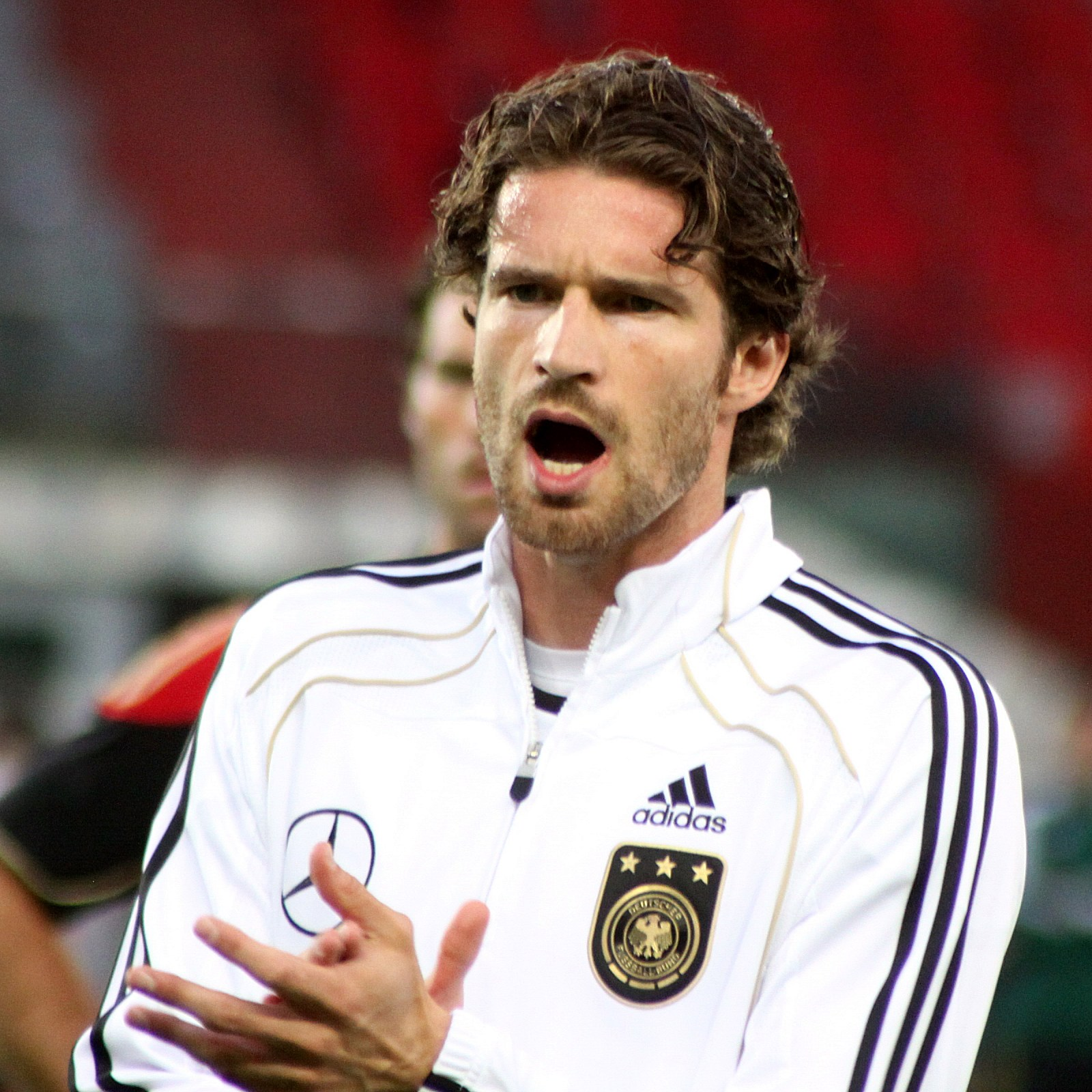
Friedrich with Germany in 2011

Friedrich played a total of five games for the Germany U-21 team and once for the B-team known as "Team 2006".

On 21 August 2002, he made his debut for the senior team against Bulgaria with in a 2–2 draw in Sofia. His first major tournament for the national team was Euro 2004 where he appeared in all three group matches that saw the German team was eliminated. On 21 December 2004, Friedrich captained Germany in a 5–1 friendly win over Thailand in Bangkok. He has captained the team three more times since.

In 2005, Germany took part in the Confederations Cup, as upcoming World Cup hosts. Friedrich took turns with Andreas Hinkel on the right wing-back position. The following year, he was part of the 23-man squad for the 2006 World Cup. Except the match for third place, which he missed due to an injury, Friedrich started all of Germany's games.

At Euro 2008, Friedrich was once again part of the German team, but was initially intended as a substitute. Following an injury to Marcell Jansen, he started the final group game and all three knock-out stage matches. The quarter-final was one of Friedrich's best international matches where he successfully shut down Portugal national team star Cristiano Ronaldo.

In March 2009, German coach Joachim Löw explained that he now planned Friedrich as a centre-back instead of the right wing-back position.

Friedrich was part of Germany's squad in the 2010 World Cup in South Africa. After a Bastian Schweinsteiger solo run, he scored his very first international goal on his 77th appearance for Germany on 3 July 2010 in the 2010 World Cup 4–0 quarter-final win over Argentina.

== Career as manager and executive ==
On 28 August 2014, it was confirmed that Friedrich was the new assistant coach of the German U18 national team. He left the position at the end of 2015.

On 27 November 2019, Friedrich was hired as a performance manager at Hertha BSC under manager Jürgen Klinsmann, who was hired earlier on the same day. After six months as performance manager, Friedrich took over as sporting director in summer 2020. Shortly after, in December, he was appointed interim managing director after manager Michael Preetz was let go. After a successful five months as interim managing director, Friedrich went back to his role of sporting director in July 2021 while simultaneously being appointed to the executive board of Hertha BSC.

== Career statistics ==
=== Club ===
Appearances and goals by club, season and competition
Club	Season	League			DFB-Pokal		Continental		Other		Total	
Club	Season	Division	Apps	Goals	Apps	Goals	Apps	Goals	Apps	Goals	Apps	Goals
Arminia Bielefeld	2000–01	Bundesliga	25	1	2	0	–		–		27	1
Arminia Bielefeld	2001–02	Bundesliga	22	0	2	0	–		–		24	0
Arminia Bielefeld	Total		47	1	2	0	0	0	0	0	49	1
Hertha BSC	2002–03	Bundesliga	33	5	1	0	8 (Note: Appearances in UEFA Cup)	0	3 (Note: Appearances in DFL-Ligapokal)	0	45	5
Hertha BSC	2003–04	Bundesliga	30	2	3	1	2	0	0	0	35	3
Hertha BSC	2004–05	Bundesliga	25	3	0	0	–		–		25	3
Hertha BSC	2005–06	Bundesliga	31	1	3	1	8	0	1	0	43	2
Hertha BSC	2006–07	Bundesliga	26	2	4	0	4	0	0	0	34	2
Hertha BSC	2007–08	Bundesliga	30	0	2	0	0	0	–		32	0
Hertha BSC	2008–09	Bundesliga	25	0	1	0	8	0	–		34	0
Hertha BSC	2009–10	Bundesliga	31	0	0	0	7 (Note: Appearances in UEFA Europa League)	0	–		38	0
Hertha BSC	Total		231	13	14	2	37	0	4	0	286	15
VfL Wolfsburg	2010–11	Bundesliga	15	0	2	0	–		–		17	0
VfL Wolfsburg	2011–12	Bundesliga	0	0	0	0	–		–		0	0
VfL Wolfsburg	Total		15	0	2	0	–		–		17	0
Chicago Fire	2012	MLS	23	1	0	0	–		1 (Note: Appearance in MLS Cup Playoffs)	0	24	1
Chicago Fire	2013	MLS	0	0	0	0	–		–		0	0
Chicago Fire	Total		23	1	0	0	–		1	0	24	1
Career total			316	15	20	2	37	0	5	0	378	17

=== International ===
Scores and results list Germany's goal tally first, score column indicates score after each Friedrich goal.

List of international goals scored by Arne Friedrich
No.	Date	Venue	Opponent	Score	Result	Competition
1	3 July 2010	Cape Town Stadium, Cape Town, South Africa	Argentina	3–0	4–0	2010 FIFA World Cup

== Honours ==
Hertha BSC

- DFB-Ligapokal: 2002
- UEFA Intertoto Cup: 2006

Germany

- UEFA European Championship runner-up: 2008
- FIFA World Cup third place: 2006, 2010
- FIFA Confederations Cup third place: 2005

Orders

- Silbernes Lorbeerblatt: 2006, 2010
