= 2011–12 Borussia Mönchengladbach season =

Borussia Mönchengladbach
2011–12 season
- Manager: Lucien Favre
- Bundesliga: 4th
- DFB-Pokal: Semi-finals
- Top goalscorer: League: Marco Reus (16); All: Marco Reus (19)
Home colours	Away colours

The 2011–12 Borussia Mönchengladbach season was the 112th season in the club's history. They played in the Bundesliga, the top tier of German football. It was the club's fourth consecutive season in this league having been promoted from the 2. Bundesliga in 2008.

They also took part in the DFB Pokal, Germany's top club knockout competition, where they reached the semifinals before being eliminated on penalties by fellow Bundesliga side Bayern Munich.

== Review and events ==
Borussia opened the 2011–12 Bundesliga season with a 1–0 victory against Bayern Munich. This was their first victory against Bayern in Munich in 16 years. In April, masked supporters of 1. FC Köln attacked a bus with Mönchengladbach supporters on it. This was the second attack within a six-week period that Köln supporters attacked a bus with Mönchengladbach supporters on it.

== Match results ==
=== Legend ===
Win Draw Loss

=== Bundesliga ===
==== League table ====
Pos	Team	Pld	W	D	L	GF	GA	GD	Pts	Qualification or relegation
2	Bayern Munich	34	23	4	7	77	22	+55	73	Qualification to Champions League group stage
3	Schalke 04	34	20	4	10	74	44	+30	64	Qualification to Champions League group stage
4	Borussia Mönchengladbach	34	17	9	8	49	24	+25	60	Qualification to Champions League play-off round
5	Bayer Leverkusen	34	15	9	10	52	44	+8	54	Qualification to Europa League group stage (Note: The 2011–12 DFB-Pokal champions (Borussia Dortmund) and runners-up (Bayern Munich) qualified for the 2012–13 UEFA Champions League, thus the three Europa League places were distributed through league positions.)
6	VfB Stuttgart	34	15	8	11	63	46	+17	53	Qualification to Europa League play-off round

Source: kicker
Rules for classification: 1) points; 2) goal difference; 3) number of goals scored.

==== Matches ====
7 August 2011 1	Bayern Munich	0–1	Borussia Mönchengladbach	Munich
17:30 CEST (UTC+02)		Match Report	De Camargo 62', (yellow card) 73'	Stadium: Allianz Arena; Attendance: 69,000; Referee: Babak Rafati; Man of the Match: Ter Stegen

13 August 2011 2	Borussia Mönchengladbach	1–1	VfB Stuttgart	Mönchengladbach
18:30 CEST (UTC+02)	Bobadilla (yellow card) 25'; Brouwers (yellow card) 36' (yellow-red card) 80'; Daems 67' (pen.); Jantschke (yellow card) 69'	Match Report	Molinaro (yellow card) 24'; Kvist (yellow card) 66'; Cacau 72'	Stadium: Borussia-Park; Attendance: 48,322; Referee: Manuel Gräfe; Man of the Match: Ter Stegen

19 August 2011 3	Borussia Mönchengladbach	4–1	VfL Wolfsburg	Mönchengladbach
20:30 CEST (UTC+02)	Reus 15', 67'; Daems 32' (pen.); Hanke (yellow card) 39'; Bobadilla 45'	Match Report	Hasebe 13'; Schulze (yellow card) 31'; Russ (yellow card) 43'	Stadium: Borussia-Park; Attendance: 43,224; Referee: Markus Schmidt; Man of the Match: Reus

28 August 2011 4	Schalke 04	1–0	Borussia Mönchengladbach	Gelsenkirchen
17:30 CEST (UTC+02)	Fuchs (yellow card) 44'; Höwedes (yellow card) 60'; Raúl 64'	Match Report	Jantschke (yellow card) 28'; Bobadilla (yellow card) 63'; Dante (yellow card) 88'	Stadium: Veltins-Arena; Attendance: 61,673; Referee: Felix Zwayer; Man of the Match: Farfán

10 September 2011 5	Borussia Mönchengladbach	1–0	1. FC Kaiserslautern	Mönchengladbach
15:30 CEST (UTC+02)	Arango 58'; Dante (yellow card) 76'; Nordtveit (yellow card) 87'	Match Report	Shechter (yellow card) 3'; Amedick (yellow card) 63'; Tiffert (yellow card) 68'; Şahan (yellow card) 90+1'	Stadium: Borussia-Park; Attendance: 52,083; Referee: Florian Meyer; Man of the Match: Arango

17 September 2011 6	Hamburger SV	0–1	Borussia Mönchengladbach	Hamburg
15:30 CEST (UTC+02)	Jarolím (yellow card) 35'; Tesche (yellow card) 78'	Match Report	Neustädter (yellow card) 33'; Reus (yellow card) 61'; De Camargo 65'; Arango (yellow card) 76'	Stadium: Imtech Arena; Attendance: 55,797; Referee: Peter Sippel; Man of the Match: Reus

24 September 2011 7	Borussia Mönchengladbach	1–0	1. FC Nürnberg	Mönchengladbach
15:30 CEST (UTC+02)	Daems 76' (pen.); Bobadilla (yellow card) 90'	Match Report	Klose (yellow card) 69'	Stadium: Borussia-Park; Attendance: 51,117; Referee: Knut Kircher; Man of the Match: Reus

1 October 2011 8	SC Freiburg	1–0	Borussia Mönchengladbach	Freiburg
15:30 CEST (UTC+02)	Flum 19', (yellow card) 33'; Krmaš (yellow card) 21'	Match Report	Marx (yellow card) 66'; Bobadilla (yellow card) 89'	Stadium: Badenova-Stadion; Attendance: 24,000; Referee: Markus Schmidt; Man of the Match: Baumann

15 October 2011 9	Borussia Mönchengladbach	2–2	Bayer Leverkusen	Mönchengladbach
15:30 CEST (UTC+02)	Arango (yellow card) 28'; Stranzl (yellow card) 54'; Reus 65'; Herrmann 72'	Match Report	Reinartz 20', (yellow card) 28'; Ballack (yellow card) 45+2'; Balitsch (yellow card) 66'; Castro (red card) 68'; Kießling (yellow card) 86'; Schürrle 87'	Stadium: Borussia-Park; Attendance: 52,858; Referee: Wolfgang Stark; Man of the Match: Leno

22 October 2011 10	1899 Hoffenheim	1–0	Borussia Mönchengladbach	Sinsheim
15:30 CEST (UTC+02)	Ibišević 56'; Beck (yellow card) 90+1'	Match Report	Stranzl (yellow card) 58'; Jantschke (yellow card) 81'; Dante (yellow card) 85'	Stadium: Wirsol Rhein Neckar Arena; Attendance: 30,150; Referee: Christian Dingert; Man of the Match: Ibišević

29 October 2011 11	Borussia Mönchengladbach	2–1	Hannover 96	Mönchengladbach
15:30 CEST (UTC+02)	Reus 21', 51'	Matych Report	Schmiedebach (yellow card) 15'; Pogatetz 26'; Ya Konan (yellow card) 89'; Stindl (yellow card) 90+1'	Stadium: Borussia-Park; Attendance: 51,036; Referee: Thorsten Kinhöfer; Man of the Match: Reus

5 November 2011 12	Hertha BSC	1–2	Borussia Mönchengladbach	Berlin
15:30 CET (UTC+01)	Ramos 18'	Match Report	Reus 33', 55'; Herrmann (yellow card) 40'; Dante (yellow card) 45+1'	Stadium: Olympiastadion; Attendance: 60,556; Referee: Tobias Welz; Man of the Match: Reus

19 November 2011 13	Borussia Mönchengladbach	5–0	Werder Bremen	Mönchengladbach
15:30 CET (UTC+01)	Herrmann 16'; Reus 23', 38', 51'; Arango 53'	Match Report	Papastathopoulos (yellow card) 37' (yellow-red card) 76'	Stadium: Borussia-Park; Attendance: 53,465; Referee: Felix Brych; Man of the Match: Reus

25 November 2011 14	1. FC Köln	0–3	Borussia Mönchengladbach	Cologne
20:30 CET (UTC+01)	Peszko (yellow card) 43'	Match Report	Hanke 20', 47'; Arango 30'; Herrmann (yellow card) 67'	Stadium: RheinEnergieStadion; Attendance: 50,000; Referee: Manuel Gräfe; Man of the Match: Hanke

3 December 2011 15	Borussia Mönchengladbach	1–1	Borussia Dortmund	Mönchengladbach
15:30 CET (UTC+01)	Hanke 72'	Match Report	Lewandowski 40'; Schmelzer (yellow card) 43'; Santana (yellow card) 74'	Stadium: Borussia-Park; Attendance: 54,047; Referee: Felix Zwayer; Man of the Match: Dante

10 December 2011 16	FC Augsburg	1–0	Borussia Mönchengladbach	Augsburg
15:30 CET (UTC+01)	Callsen-Bracker 51', (yellow card) 84'; Mölders (yellow card) 54'; Hosogai (yellow card) 86'	Match Report	Marx (yellow card) 41'; De Camargo (yellow card) 69'	Stadium: SGL arena Attendance: 30,660; Referee: Markus Schmidt; Man of the Match: Sankoh

18 December 2011 17	Borussia Mönchengladbach	1–0	Mainz 05	Mönchengladbach
17:30 CET (UTC+01)	Herrmann 5', (yellow card) 86'; Nordtveit (yellow card) 45+1'; Dante (yellow card) 46'	Match Report	Pospěch (yellow card) 85'; Allagui (yellow card) 90'; Bungert (yellow card) 90+3'	Stadium: Borussia-Park; Attendance: 49,089; Referee: Peter Gagelmann; Man of the Match: Herrmann

20 January 2012 18	Borussia Mönchengladbach	3–1	Bayern Munich	Mönchengladbach
20:30 CET	Reus 11'; Herrmann 41', 71'	Match Report	Schweinsteiger 76'	Stadium: Borussia-Park; Attendance: 54,047; Referee: Thorsten Kinhöfer

29 January 2012 19	VfB Stuttgart	0–3	Borussia Mönchengladbach	Stuttgart
17:30 CET (UTC+01)		[uk.soccerway.com/matches/2012/01/29/germany/bundesliga/vfb-stuttgart-1893-ev/borussia-monchengladbach/1122103/ Summary]	Hanke 31'; Nordtveit (yellow card) 76'; Reus 81'; De Camargo 84'	Stadium: Mercedes-Benz Arena; Attendance: 53,600; Referee: Günter Perl

4 February 2012 20	VfL Wolfsburg	0–0	Borussia Mönchengladbach	Wolfsburg
15:30 CET (UTC+01)	Jiráček (yellow card) 32'	Summary	Jantschke (yellow card) 79'	Stadium: Volkswagen Arena; Attendance: 30,000; Referee: Peter Gagelmann

11 February 2012 21	Borussia Mönchengladbach	3–0	Schalke 04	Mönchengladbach
18:30 CET (UTC+01)	Reus 2'; Hanke 15'; Arango 32'; Nordtveit (yellow card) 54'	Summary	Höwedes (yellow card) 31'; Obasi (yellow card) 34'; Papadopoulos (yellow card) 59'	Stadium: Borussia-Park; Attendance: 54,049; Referee: Manuel Gräfe

18 February 2012 22	1. FC Kaiserslautern	1–2	Borussia Mönchengladbach	Kaiserslautern
15:30 CET (UTC+01)	Şahan (yellow card) 17'; Wagner (yellow card) 60'; Jessen 63'; Dick (yellow card) 89'	Summary	Herrmann 9'; Arango 14'; Brouwers (yellow card) 80'	Stadium: Fritz-Walter-Stadion; Attendance: 45,661; Referee: Michael Weiner

24 February 2012 23	Borussia Mönchengladbach	1–1	Hamburger SV	Mönchengladbach
20:30 CET (UTC+01)	Reus (yellow card) 39'; Hanke 45'	Summary	Arslan 56'; Rincón (yellow card) 80'; Arslan (yellow card) 87'; Jarolím (yellow card) 88'	Stadium: Borussia-Park; Attendance: 54,049; Referee: Günter Perl

4 March 2012 24	1. FC Nürnberg	1–0	Borussia Mönchengladbach	Nuremberg
15:30 CET (UTC+01)	Pekhart (yellow card) 71'; Bunjaku 87'	Summary	Daems (yellow card) 74'	Stadium: Frankenstadion; Attendance: 45,675; Referee: Tobias Welz

10 March 2012 25	Borussia Mönchengladbach	0–0	SC Freiburg	Mönchengladbach
15:30 CET (UTC+01)	Stranzl (yellow card) 61'; Jantschke (yellow card) 90+1'	Summary	Caligiuri (yellow card) 46'	Stadium: Borussia-Park; Attendance: 52,207; Referee: Peter Sippel

17 March 2012 26	Bayer Leverkusen	1–2	Borussia Mönchengladbach	Leverkusen
15:30 CET (UTC+01)	Toprak (yellow card) 59'; Schwaab (yellow card) 69'; Kießling 75'	Summary	Reus 7'; Stranzl (yellow card) 57'; Nordtveit (yellow card) 85'; De Camargo 88'	Stadium: BayArena; Attendance: 30,210; Referee: Florian Meyer

24 March 2012 27	Borussia Mönchengladbach	1–2	1899 Hoffenheim	Mönchengladbach
15:30 CET (UTC+01)	Marx (yellow card) 29'; Reus 38'; Brouwers (yellow card) 89'; Wendt (yellow card) 90+3'	Summary	Salihović (yellow card) 39'; Compper (yellow card) 57'; Firmino 77', (yellow card) 77'; Vukčević 79'	Stadium: Borussia-Park; Attendance: 52,796; Referee: Wolfgang Stark

1 April 2012 28	Hannover 96	2–1	Borussia Mönchengladbach	Hanover
15:30 CET (UTC+01)	Ya Konan 57'; Diouf 77'	Summary	Dante (yellow card) 63'; Nordtveit 78'	Stadium: AWD-Arena; Attendance: 49,000; Referee: Felix Brych

7 April 2012 29	Borussia Mönchengladbach	0–0	Hertha BSC	Mönchengladbach
18:30 CET (UTC+01)		Summary	Ben-Hatira (yellow card) 87'	Stadium: Borussia-Park; Attendance: 52,691; Referee: Deniz Aytekin

10 April 2012 30	Werder Bremen	2–2	Borussia Mönchengladbach	Bremen
20:00 CET (UTC+01)	Rosenberg 18'; Boenisch (red card) 27'; Naldo 74'	Summary	Neustädter (yellow card) 36'; Reus (yellow card) 39'; Brouwers (yellow card) 49'; Hanke 52', 67'; Arango (yellow card) 60'	Stadium: Weserstadion; Attendance: 42,100; Referee: Marco Fritz

15 April 2012 31	Borussia Mönchengladbach	3–0	1. FC Köln	Mönchengladbach
15:30 CET (UTC+01)	Arango 19'; Jantschke 53'; Reus 55'; Dante (yellow card) 82'	Summary	Geromel (yellow card) 67'; Podolski (yellow card) 79'	Stadium: Borussia-Park; Attendance: 52,990; Referee: Knut Kircher

21 April 2012 32	Borussia Dortmund	2–0	Borussia Mönchengladbach	Dortmund
18:30	Perišić 23'; Kagawa (yellow card) 58', (goal) 59'	Summary	Stranzl (yellow card) 59'	Stadium: Signal Iduna Park; Attendance: 80,720; Referee: Florian Meyer

28 April 2012 33	Borussia Mönchengladbach	0–0	FC Augsburg	Mönchengladbach
15:30 CEST (UTC+02)		Summary	Ndjeng (yellow card) 42'; Morávek (yellow card) 72'	Stadium: Borussia-Park; Attendance: 53,306; Referee: Michael Weiner

5 May 2012 34	Mainz 05	0-3	Borussia Mönchengladbach	Mainz
15:30 CEST (UTC+02)		Summary	Reus 31', 62'; De Camargo 69'	Stadium: Coface Arena; Attendance: 34,000; Referee: Wolfgang Stark

=== DFB-Pokal ===
29 July 2011 1st Round	Jahn Regensburg	1–3	Borussia Mönchengladbach	Regensburg
20:30 CEST (UTC+02)	Schweinsteiger 29' (pen.); Klauß (yellow card) 56'; Philp (yellow card) 64'	Match Report	Stranzl 13'; Reus 22'; Ter Stegen (yellow card) 29'; De Camargo 71'	Stadium: Jahnstadion; Attendance: 10,388; Referee: Tobias Welz

25 October 2011 2nd Round	1. FC Heidenheim	0–0 (a.e.t.) (3–4 p)	Borussia Mönchengladbach	Heidenheim
19:00 CEST (UTC+02)	Schittenhelm (yellow card) 43'; Sirigu (yellow card) 47'; Spann (yellow card) 104'	Match Report	Dante (yellow card) 69'	Stadium: Voith-Arena; Attendance: 10,000; Referee: Markus Wingenbach; Man of the Match: Ter Stegen
	Penalties
	Sauter (penalty scored); Krebs (penalty scored); Spann (penalty missed); Schittenhelm (penalty scored); Tausendpfund (penalty missed)		(penalty scored) Daems; (penalty scored) Dante; (penalty scored) Nordtveit; (penalty scored) Stranzl

21 December 2011 3rd Round	Borussia Mönchengladbach	3–1	Schalke 04	Mönchengladbach
20:30 CET (UTC+01)	Arango 18'; Reus 56', 88'; De Camargo (yellow card) 90+1'	Summary	Jones (yellow card) 10' (yellow-red card) 90+1'; Papadopoulos (yellow card) 28'; Huntelaar (yellow card) 47' (yellow-red card) 47'; Draxler 70'	Stadium: Borussia-Park; Attendance: 54,057; Referee: Wolfgang Stark

8 February 2012 Quarter-finals	Hertha BSC	0–2 (a.e.t.)	Borussia Mönchengladbach	Berlin
19:00	Ebert (yellow card) 45+1'; Hubník (red card) 100'	Summary	Dante (yellow card) 55'; De Camargo (yellow card) 76'; Daems 101' (pen.); Wendt 102+2'	Stadium: Olympiastadion; Attendance: 47,465; Referee: Felix Brych

21 March 2012 Semi-finals	Borussia Mönchengladbach	0–0 (a.e.t.) (2–4 p)	Bayern Munich	Mönchengladbach
20:30	Jantschke (yellow card) 100'	Summary	Robben (yellow card) 42'; Kroos (yellow card) 99'	Stadium: Borussia-Park; Attendance: 54,049; Referee: Thorsten Kinnhöfer

== Player information ==
=== Roster and statistics ===
As of 5 May 2012

Squad Season 2011–12 Sources:
Player						Bundesliga		DFB-Pokal		Totals	
No.	Player	Nat.	Birthday	at Borussia since	Previous club	Matches	Goals	Matches	Goal	Matches	Goals
Goalkeepers
	Marc-André ter Stegen	German	30 April 1992	1996	—	34	0	5	0	39	0
	Janis Blaswich	German	2 May 1991	2005	VfR Mehrhoog	0	0	0	0	0	0
	Christofer Heimeroth	German	1 August 1981	2006	Schalke 04	0	0	0	0	0	0
Defenders
	Roel Brouwers	Dutch	28 November 1981	2007	SC Paderborn	21	0	4	0	25	0
	Filip Daems	Belgian	31 October 1978	2005	Gençlerbirliği	31	3	5	1	36	4
	Dante	Brazilian	18 October 1983	2009	Standard Liège	33	0	5	0	38	0
	Tony Jantschke	German	7 April 1990	2006	FV Dresden-Nord	32	1	4	0	36	1
	Martin Stranzl	Austrian	16 June 1980	2011	Spartak Moscow	22	0	4	1	26	1
	Oscar Wendt	Swedish	24 October 1985	2011	Copenhagen	14	0	2	1	16	1
	Matthias Zimmermann	German	16 June 1992	2011	Karlsruher SC	1	0	0	0	1	0
Midfielders
	Juan Arango	Venezuelan	17 May 1980	2009	Mallorca	34	6	4	1	38	7
	Patrick Herrmann	German	12 February 1992	2008	1. FC Saarbrücken	27	6	4	0	31	6
	Julian Korb	German	21 March 1992	2006	MSV Duisburg	1	0	0	0	1	0
	Thorben Marx	German	1 June 1981	2009	Arminia Bielefeld	19	0	3	0	22	0
	Roman Neustädter	German	18 February 1988	2009	Mainz 05	33	0	5	0	38	0
	Håvard Nordtveit	Norwegian	21 June 1990	2011	Arsenal	31	1	5	0	36	1
	Yuki Otsu	Japanese	24 March 1990	2011	Kashiwa Reysol	3	0	1	0	4	0
	Marco Reus	German	31 May 1989	2009	Rot Weiss Ahlen	32	18	5	3	37	21
	Lukas Rupp	German	8 January 1991	2011	Karlsruher SC	3	0	1	0	4	0
Forwards
	Raúl Bobadilla	Argentinian	18 June 1987	2011	Aris	15	1	1	0	16	1
	Igor de Camargo	Belgian	12 May 1983	2010	Standard Liège	25	5	4	1	29	6
	Mike Hanke	German	5 November 1983	2010	Hannover 96	31	8	5	0	36	8
	Elias Kachunga	German	22 April 1994	2005	VfB Hilden	0	0	0	0	0	0
	Joshua King	Norwegian	15 January 1992	2011	Manchester United	2	0	0	0	2	0
	Mathew Leckie	Australian	4 February 1991	2011	Adelaide United	9	0	2	0	11	0

=== Transfers ===
==== In ====
No.	Pos.	Nat.	Name	Age	EU	Moving from	Type	Transfer window	Ends	Transfer fee	Source
17	DF	(Sweden)	Oscar Wendt	25	EU	Copenhagen (Denmark)	Transfer	Summer	2014	Free	
2	DF	(Germany)	Matthias Zimmermann	19	EU	Karlsruher SC	Transfer	Summer	Undisclosed	Undisclosed	
8	MF	(Germany)	Lukas Rupp	20	EU	Karlsruher SC	Transfer	Summer	Undisclosed	Undisclosed	
9	FW	(Argentina)	Raúl Bobadilla	24	Non-EU	Aris (Greece)	Loan Return	Summer			
23	MF	(Japan)	Yuki Otsu	21	Non-EU	Kashiwa Reysol (Japan)	Transfer	Summer	2014	Undisclosed	
15	FW	(Norway)	Joshua King	19	Non-EU	Manchester United (England)	Loan	Summer	2012	Undisclosed	
20	FW	(Australia)	Mathew Leckie	20	Non-EU	Adelaide United (Australia)	Transfer	Summer			

==== Out ====
Roman Neustädter

== Coaching and backroom staff ==
Position	Staff
Head Coach	Lucien Favre
Assistant Coach	Frank Geideck
Assistant Coach	Manfred Stefes
Goalkeeping Coach	Uwe Kamps
Team Doctor and Orthopedic Surgeon	Dr. Stefan Hertl
Team Doctor	Dr. Heribert Ditzel
Team Doctor and Orthopedic surgeon	Dr. Stefan Porten
Athletic Trainer	Christian Weigl
Physiotherapist	Andreas Bluhm
Physiotherapist	Dirk Müller
Physiotherapist	Adam Szordykowski

Last updated: 11 December 2011
Source: Borussia Mönchengladbach's official website

== Kits ==
Home	Home Alternate	Home Alt. 2	Home Alt. 3	Away
