= Gábor Király =

Hungarian footballer (born 1976)

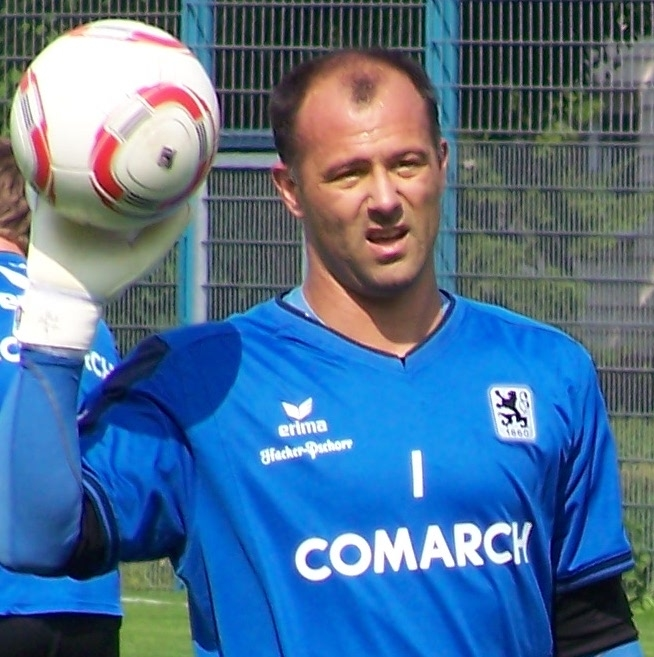
- Király training with 1860 Munich in 2011

Personal information
- Full name: Gábor Ferenc Király
- Date of birth: 1 April 1976 (age 50)
- Place of birth: Szombathely, Hungary
- Height: 1.90 m (6 ft 3 in)
- Position: Goalkeeper

Senior career*
Years	Team	Apps	(Gls)
1993–1997	Haladás	96	(0)
1997–2004	Hertha BSC	198	(0)
2004–2007	Crystal Palace	104	(0)
2006	→ West Ham United (loan)	0	(0)
2006–2007	→ Aston Villa (loan)	5	(0)
2007–2009	Burnley	27	(0)
2009	→ Bayer Leverkusen (loan)	0	(0)
2009–2014	1860 Munich	168	(0)
2014–2015	Fulham	4	(0)
2015–2019	Haladás	107	(0)
Total		709	(0)

International career
1993–1994	Hungary U18	6	(0)
1996–1997	Hungary U21	5	(0)
1998–2016	Hungary	108	(0)
- * Club domestic league appearances and goals

Gábor Ferenc Király (Hungarian pronunciation: [ˈkiraːj ˈɡaːbor ˈfɛrɛnt͡s]; born 1 April 1976) is a Hungarian former professional footballer who played as a goalkeeper.

In his 25-year-long playing career, Király spent most of his career in Germany and England. He signed for Hertha BSC in 1997, going on to appear in 198 official games, and played for 1860 Munich later in his career. In England, he represented Crystal Palace, Burnley, and Fulham and had loan spells with West Ham United, and Aston Villa. In 2015, he re-joined his hometown team Haladás.

Since making his international debut against Austria in 1998, Király amassed a record 108 caps for the Hungary national team. He represented his nation at UEFA Euro 2016, and on 14 June 2016, he became the oldest player to represent their country at a UEFA European Championship at 40 years and 74 days, beating the previous record of 39 years and 91 days held by Lothar Matthäus. The record was later extended to 40 years and 86 days on 26 June 2016. Király retired from international football after the tournament.

Throughout his career, Király was known for wearing a recognisable pair of grey tracksuit bottoms instead of shorts in almost every match he played. "I will never take off my sweatpants" he swore.

== Club career ==
=== Early career ===
Born in Szombathely, Király began his career with local club Haladás in 1993, moving to Bundesliga club Hertha BSC in 1997.

=== Hertha BSC ===
At Hertha, he was initially the second-choice keeper, but after a streak of seven matches without a win, he was chosen over the first-choice goalkeeper Christian Fiedler for Hertha's home match against 1. FC Köln on 28 September 1997 in which they managed their first Bundesliga victory that season. He subsequently became the first-choice keeper and Fiedler did not appear in the Bundesliga for more than two years, until February 2000, when Király missed seven league matches due to an injury. He also appeared in 10 UEFA Champions League matches for Hertha in the 1999–2000 season of the competition.

However, after Hans Meyer was named the new Hertha coach in the winter break of the 2003–04 Bundesliga season, Király lost his place in the starting line-up and Fiedler was named the first-choice keeper after spending most of the previous six years on the bench. Király was then told his contract would only be renewed if he took a pay cut. In the spring of 2004, he only played the last 14 minutes of Hertha's final Bundesliga match of the season, against 1. FC Köln; the same club against whom he had made his Bundesliga debut. Overall he played almost 200 top-flight matches for Hertha.

=== Crystal Palace ===
Crystal Palace made Király their first signing for the 2004–05 season; but also signed Argentine goalkeeper Julián Speroni later that pre-season and it was he who was initially installed as the first-choice keeper. Király made his debut for Palace in the League Cup game at home to Hartlepool United where his performance, along with the poor form of Speroni, resulted in his promotion to the first choice in Palace goal. He stayed in the first team for over 12 months before being rested over the Christmas period in 2005, making 32 Premier League appearances before Palace were relegated back to the Championship following the 2004–05 season. After the rest, he went straight back into the Palace side, and kept his place for the remainder of the 2005–06 season in which he made 43 appearances in the Championship.

On 18 May 2006, Király made a transfer request. With the signing of Scott Flinders, it seemed he would leave Crystal Palace and his chances of securing a move to the Premier League seemed to increase on 30 May, when he impressed for Hungary in their 3–1 defeat to England, saving a penalty by Frank Lampard in the process. However, Bob Dowie, Palace's director of football, revealed that the club had received no offers for the keeper's services, and thus he started a third season at Palace.

New manager Peter Taylor installed Király as his number-one choice in goal, with Flinders as his backup, but later on in the season Flinders was recalled from a loan spell and replaced Király in the starting line-up. However, Flinders only played two games, conceding seven goals and giving Király a quick return to the first team.

Király had a two-week loan spell at Premier League side West Ham United from mid-November to early December 2006 in which he did not make an appearance, spending three matches on the bench as an unused substitute.

Király then returned to Palace, but almost immediately left for another loan spell at Aston Villa for one month, following injuries to Villa's regular keepers Thomas Sørensen and Stuart Taylor. At Villa, Király eventually managed a return to playing Premier League football after an eighteen-month absence following Palace's relegation. The 30-year-old was given his Villa debut on 16 December 2006 in their 1–0 defeat to Bolton Wanderers at Villa Park. The last match in his loan spell at Villa was their third-round FA Cup match against Manchester United at Old Trafford on 7 January 2007. After an otherwise strong performance, Király's late error gifted Manchester United a 2–1 victory. Following Sørensen and Taylor's return to fitness, he was allowed to return to Palace on 12 January 2007.

By the end of January 2007, he made a return in the Palace goal, with his first league match being a goalless draw away at Sunderland on 30 January 2007. Király continued in the team until the end of the season, when Speroni stepped in with three games remaining. After the last game, Taylor announced that Király had left the club in the week before the match.

=== Burnley ===
Király joined Burnley on 30 May 2007 after being released by Crystal Palace.

In January 2009, Király left Burnley on loan to Bayer Leverkusen as cover for their injured second choice keeper.

=== 1860 Munich ===
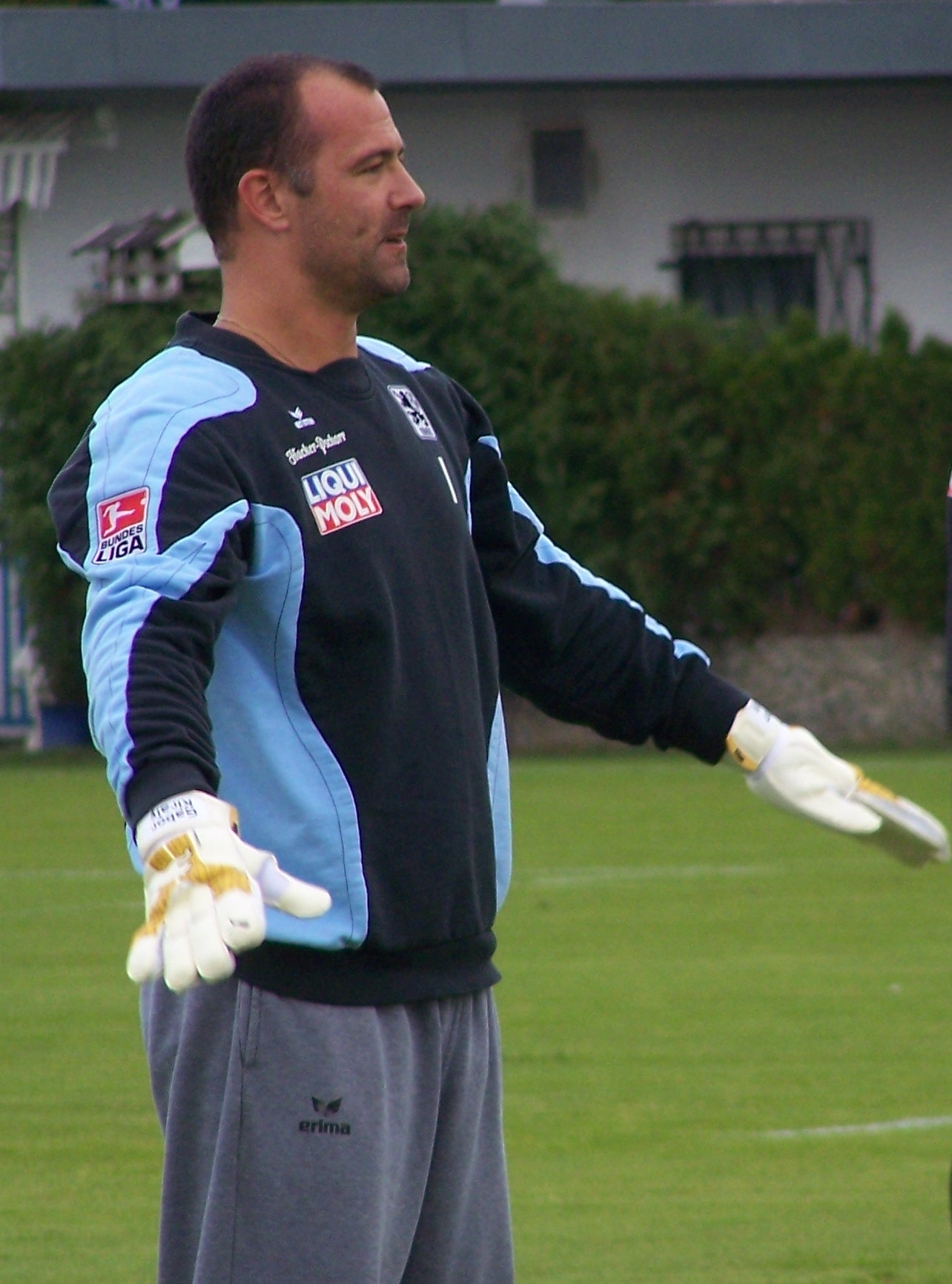
Király at 1860 Munich, 2009

In June 2009, Király was released by Burnley at the end of his contract alongside Steve Jones and Alan Mahon. On 3 June 2009, signed a three-year contract with TSV 1860 Munich.

After the second match of the 2014–15 season Király was suspended to the second squad along with his teammates Vitus Eicher, Daniel Adlung, Yannick Stark and captain Julian Weigl. Király had assaulted Gary Kagelmacher during a match, while the other four players had been out drinking late at night and were overheard talking negatively about the club.

=== Fulham ===
On 28 August 2014, it was announced that Király had signed for the English Championship side Fulham. In September 2014, against Reading, Király made his Fulham debut, and was in action multiple times, but the pressure inevitably told, with two goals against him within an hour. Király tipped a header from home substitute Pavel Pogrebnyak – a former Fulham player – against the crossbar and Jake Taylor drove narrowly wide from distance. But Fulham could not hold out at 2–0 until the end. In the 85th minute, substitute Nick Blackman ran through, went by Király and slotted the ball home.

=== Retirement ===
Király announced his retirement from playing in May 2019.

== International career ==
Király made his debut for the Hungary national team against Austria on 25 March 1998 in Ernst-Happel-Stadion. After only four minutes, he saved a penalty from Austria's all-time top scorer Toni Polster, and Hungary won 3–2. During the 2006 FIFA World Cup qualifying, Király was the only player in the Hungarian squad to appear in all of their ten qualifying matches. He had not played for the national team since the embarrassing 2–1 defeat by Malta on 11 October 2006, but was called up to the squad for the World Cup Qualifiers against Sweden and Portugal in September 2009 and has remained in the squad despite being second choice behind Gábor Babos.

On 12 November 2015, he earned his 100th cap for Hungary in a 1–0 win away to Norway in the first leg of their UEFA Euro 2016 qualifying play-off in Oslo. He was the second Hungarian to reach the milestone, after József Bozsik of the Golden Team. Király was eventually called up in Hungary's UEFA Euro 2016 squad.

On 14 June 2016, Király played at UEFA Euro 2016 in the first match of Group F in a 2–0 victory over Austria at Nouveau Stade de Bordeaux, Bordeaux, France. Hence, he became the oldest player to feature in the competition at 40 years and 70 days, breaking Lothar Matthäus' record by almost a year. Three days later on 18 June 2016 he played in a 1–1 draw against Iceland at the Stade Vélodrome, Marseille. He also played in the last group match in a 3–3 draw against Portugal at the Parc Olympique Lyonnais, Lyon on 22 June 2016. He later played in a 4–0 defeat against Belgium in the round of 16, in which he managed to extend his record as the oldest player to appear in the competition, aged 40 years and 86 days. He announced his retirement from international football on 2 August 2016. However, on 15 November 2016, he played his testimonial match against Sweden. He played the first 30 minutes in 2–0 loss.

== Tracksuit trousers ==
Throughout his career, Király has stood out for his gimmick of wearing a recognisable pair of grey tracksuit bottoms instead of shorts in almost every match he has played since 1996; several commentators have taken note of his unusual attire. He said in an interview that they are grey in colour because they bring him good luck.

In an interview with UEFA.com, he said that "I'm a goalie, not a top model. It's essentially a question of comfort. I've played on clay or grass that's been frozen in winter; it makes your legs hurt when you dive so jogging bottoms seemed obvious. I always take a size above to facilitate movement. I tried shorts during my spells in Germany and England but it didn't suit me. The end result is more important than your look."

== Király SZE ==
In 2006 Király founded his own association football club, Király SZE.

== Career statistics ==
=== Club ===
Appearances and goals by club, season and competition
Club	Season	League			Cup		League Cup		Europe		Other		Total	
Club	Season	Division	Apps	Goals	Apps	Goals	Apps	Goals	Apps	Goals	Apps	Goals	Apps	Goals
Haladás	1993–94	NB I	15	0	0	0	—		—		—		15	0
Haladás	1994–95	NB II	29	0	0	0	—		—		—		29	0
Haladás	1995–96	NB I	19	0	0	0	—		—		—		19	0
Haladás	1996–97	NB I	33	0	8	0	—		—		—		41	0
Haladás	Total		96	0	8	0	—		—		—		104	0
Hertha BSC	1997–98	Bundesliga	27	0	1	0	—		—		—		28	0
Hertha BSC	1998–99	Bundesliga	34	0	3	0	—		—		—		37	0
Hertha BSC	1999–2000	Bundesliga	27	0	2	0	0	0	12	0	—		41	0
Hertha BSC	2000–01	Bundesliga	34	0	2	0	3	0	6	0	—		45	0
Hertha BSC	2001–02	Bundesliga	25	0	1	0	3	0	4	0	—		33	0
Hertha BSC	2002–03	Bundesliga	33	0	1	0	2	0	8	0	—		44	0
Hertha BSC	2003–04	Bundesliga	18	0	3	0	1	0	2	0	—		24	0
Hertha BSC	Total		198	0	13	0	9	0	32	0	—		252	0
Crystal Palace	2004–05	Premier League	32	0	1	0	1	0	—		—		34	0
Crystal Palace	2005–06	Championship	43	0	3	0	0	0	—		2	0	48	0
Crystal Palace	2006–07	Championship	29	0	—		0	0	—		—		29	0
Crystal Palace	Total		104	0	4	0	1	0	—		2	0	111	0
West Ham United (loan)	2006–07	Premier League	0	0	1	0	—		—		—		1	0
Aston Villa (loan)	2006–07	Premier League	5	0	—		—		—		—		5	0
Burnley (loan)	2007–08	Championship	27	0	1	0	1	0	—		—		29	0
Bayer Leverkusen (loan)	2008–09	Bundesliga	0	0	0	0	—		—		—		0	0
1860 Munich	2009–10	2. Bundesliga	33	0	3	0	—		—		—		36	0
1860 Munich	2010–11	2. Bundesliga	33	0	2	0	—		—		—		35	0
1860 Munich	2011–12	2. Bundesliga	32	0	2	0	—		—		—		34	0
1860 Munich	2012–13	2. Bundesliga	34	0	1	0	—		—		—		35	0
1860 Munich	2013–14	2. Bundesliga	34	0	2	0	—		—		—		36	0
1860 Munich	2014–15	2. Bundesliga	2	0	0	0	—		—		—		2	0
1860 Munich	Total		168	0	10	0	—		—		—		178	0
Fulham	2014–15	League Championship	4	0	0	0	1	0	—		—		5	0
Haladás	2015–16	NB I	33	0	0	0	—		—		—		33	0
Haladás	2016–17	NB I	19	0	0	0	—		—		—		19	0
Haladás	2017–18	NB I	31	0	0	0	—		—		—		31	0
Haladás	2018–19	NB I	24	0	0	0	—		—		—		24	0
Haladás	Total		107	0	0	0	—		—		—		107	0
Career total			709	0	37	0	11	0	32	0	2	0	791	0

=== International ===
Appearances and goals by national team and year
National team	Year	Apps	Goals
Hungary	1998	6	0
Hungary	1999	9	0
Hungary	2000	7	0
Hungary	2001	8	0
Hungary	2002	9	0
Hungary	2003	7	0
Hungary	2004	6	0
Hungary	2005	10	0
Hungary	2006	7	0
Hungary	2007	0	0
Hungary	2008	0	0
Hungary	2009	1	0
Hungary	2010	7	0
Hungary	2011	7	0
Hungary	2012	2	0
Hungary	2013	3	0
Hungary	2014	2	0
Hungary	2015	9	0
Hungary	2016	8	0
Total		108	0

== Honours ==
Hertha Berlin

- DFL-Ligapokal: 2001, 2002

Individual

- UEFA Save of the Season: 2015–16

== See also ==
- List of men's footballers with 100 or more international caps
