= Denis Lapaczinski =

German footballer and manager

Personal information
- Date of birth: 26 September 1981 (age 45)
- Place of birth: Reutlingen, West Germany
- Height: 1.85 m (6 ft 1 in)
- Position: Defender

Youth career
- 1998–1999: VfB Stuttgart

Senior career*
Years	Team	Apps	(Gls)
1999–2001	SSV Reutlingen	56	(11)
2001–2004	Hertha BSC	22	(2)
2004–2006	Hansa Rostock	26	(0)
2006–2007	1899 Hoffenheim	2	(0)
2007–2008	1899 Hoffenheim II	27	(1)
2009	SSV Reutlingen	18	(3)
2009–2011	Schalke 04 II	27	(2)

International career
2002–2003	Germany U-21	5	(0)

Managerial career
- 2011: SSV Reutlingen (caretaker)
- * Club domestic league appearances and goals

Denis Lapaczinski (born 26 September 1981) is a German former professional football player and manager who played as a defender.

== Playing career ==
Lapaczinski was born in Reutlingen. He spent four seasons in the Bundesliga with Hertha BSC and Hansa Rostock.

== Coaching career ==
Lapaczinski, along with Petros Tengelidis, became co–interim head coach of Reutlingen 05 on 24 November 2011. They managed two matches before Reutlingen 05 hired Murat Isik as their new head coach on 31 December 2011.

== Coaching record ==
As of 22 January 2014

Team	From	To	Record					
Team	From	To	G	W	D	L	Win %	Ref.
Reutlingen 05	25 November 2011	31 December 2011	2	1	0	1	50.00	
Total			2	1	0	1	50.00	—

== Honours ==
- DFB-Ligapokal: 2001, 2002
