= Sead Zilić =

Bosnian football player (born 1982)

Personal information
- Date of birth: 17 September 1982 (age 44)
- Place of birth: Prijepolje, Yugoslavia
- Height: 1.78 m (5 ft 10 in)
- Position: Striker

Youth career
- –1998: Partizan
- 1998–2000: Fiorentina

Senior career*
Years	Team	Apps	(Gls)
2000–2002	Hertha BSC	1	(0)
2002–2003	Sarajevo	2	(0)
2003–2005	Drava Ptuj	43	(18)
2005–2006	Wisła Płock	24	(5)
2006–2009	Drava Ptuj	92	(30)
2009	Maccabi Petah Tikva	0	(0)
2010	Drava Ptuj	10	(2)
2010–2011	AO Trikala	0	(0)
2011	Domžale	5	(0)
2012–2013	Grad		
2014	St. Stefan Rosental	19	(12)
2015	SV Frauental	7	(2)
2015–2016	UFC Wettmannstätten	24	(10)
2016	SV Sinabelkirchen	11	(7)
2017–2018	USV Hatzendorf	12	(11)
Total		250	(97)

International career
2000	Bosnia and Herzegovina U21	7	(1)
- * Club domestic league appearances and goals

Sead Zilić (born 17 September 1982) is a Bosnian former professional footballer who played as a striker.

He holds Serbian, Bosnian and Slovenian citizenships.

== Club career ==
He made his debut on the professional league level in the Bundesliga for Hertha BSC on 10 February 2000 when he came on as a substitute in the 45th minute of the game against VfL Wolfsburg. For Wisła Płock he made one appearance in European cup competitions.

He played the latter years of his career in the Austrian lower leagues.

== Honours ==
Wisła Płock

- Polish Cup: 2005–06
