= Roberto Pinto =

Portuguese-German footballer

Personal information
- Full name: Roberto Gonçalves Pinto
- Date of birth: 22 August 1978 (age 48)
- Place of birth: Stuttgart, West Germany
- Height: 1.70 m (5 ft 7 in)
- Position: Midfielder

Senior career*
Years	Team	Apps	(Gls)
1997–2001	VfB Stuttgart	52	(2)
2001–2004	Hertha BSC	34	(2)
2005–2006	Arminia Bielefeld	43	(2)
2006–2007	Grasshopper Club Zürich	31	(1)
2008–2012	SV Sandhausen	129	(19)
Total		289	(26)
- * Club domestic league appearances and goals

Roberto Gonçalves Pinto (born 22 August 1978) is a Portuguese-German footballer who played as a midfielder.

== Club career ==
Pinto was born in Stuttgart.

He was released by Hertha BSC in summer 2004. In January 2005, he signed an 18-month deal with Arminia Bielefeld, having been without club for six months. In summer 2007, he signed a two-year contract with Grasshopper Club Zürich.

== Honours ==
VfB Stuttgart

- UEFA Intertoto Cup: 2000

Hertha Berlin

- DFB-Ligapokal winner: 2001, 2002
