= Nando Rafael =

Angolan footballer (born 1984)

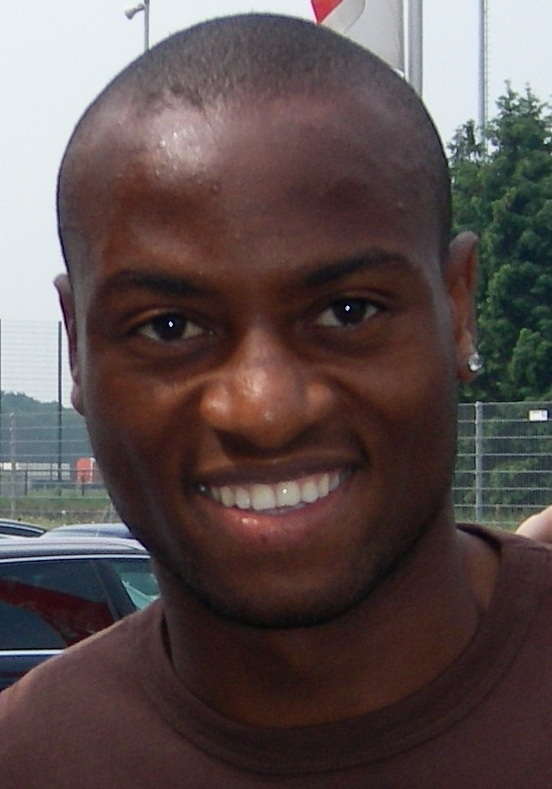
- Rafael in 2007

Personal information
- Date of birth: 10 January 1984 (age 42)
- Place of birth: Luanda, Angola
- Height: 1.80 m (5 ft 11 in)
- Position: Forward

Youth career
- 1994–2001: Ajax

Senior career*
Years	Team	Apps	(Gls)
2001–2002	Ajax II	18	(2)
2001–2002	Ajax	0	(0)
2002–2006	Hertha BSC II	26	(18)
2002–2006	Hertha BSC	70	(16)
2006–2008	Borussia Mönchengladbach	45	(9)
2006–2008	Borussia Mönchengladbach II	3	(0)
2008–2009	AGF	33	(10)
2010	→ FC Augsburg (loan)	10	(4)
2010–2012	FC Augsburg	33	(16)
2012–2013	Fortuna Düsseldorf	11	(2)
2013–2014	Henan Jianye	35	(10)
2015–2016	VfL Bochum	8	(1)
Total		292	(88)

International career
2005–2006	Germany U21	13	(5)
2012	Angola	3	(0)
- * Club domestic league appearances and goals

Nando Rafael (born 10 January 1984) is an Angolan former professional footballer who played as a forward. A former youth international for Germany, he played for the Angola national team three times.

== Early life ==
Rafael was born in Luanda. He fled from the Angolan Civil War at the age of eight after both of his parents had been killed, and resided at first illegally in the Netherlands. There he did not receive a work permit and was therefore unable to play football professionally, forcing him to move elsewhere.

== Club career ==
In 2002, Rafael signed for Hertha BSC in Germany. In 2006, he was signed by Borussia Mönchengladbach. His first season at AGF was partly spoiled by injuries, making his impact on the team less significant than expected. His physically strong appearance makes him a solid target player, but he also has good technical skills and is a competent goal scorer. He joined from AGF on 10 January 2010 on loan to FC Augsburg for one season. On 19 July 2010, Rafael signed a two-year contract with FC Augsburg.

On 27 June 2013, Rafael joined China League One club Henan Jianye, replacing Joël Tshibamba who was released by the club.

== International career ==
Rafael was born in Angola, raised in the Netherlands, and moved to Germany as a teenager to further his footballing career. Rafael eventually received a German passport and was a German international at U21 level. He switched to the Angola in the 2012 Africa Cup of Nations. He already played for Palancas Negras in a rated-B friendly match against Portuguese side Sporting CP on 10 November 2011.

== Career statistics ==
Appearances and goals by club, season and competition
Club	Season	League			National cup		League cup		Continental		Total	
Club	Season	Division	Apps	Goals	Apps	Goals	Apps	Goals	Apps	Goals	Apps	Goals
Ajax II	2001–02	Beloften Eredivisie	18	2			—		—			
Ajax	2001–02	Eredivisie	0	0	0	0	—		0	0	0	0
Hertha BSC II	2002–03	NOFV-Oberliga Nord	16	13	—		—		—		16	13
Hertha BSC II	2003–04	NOFV-Oberliga Nord	10	5	—		—		—		10	5
Hertha BSC II	Total		26	18	0	0	0	0	0		26	18
Hertha BSC	2002–03	Bundesliga	6	2	0	0	0	0	1	0	7	2
Hertha BSC	2003–04	Bundesliga	24	5	3	1	0	0	0	0	27	6
Hertha BSC	2004–05	Bundesliga	28	6	2	0	—		—		30	6
Hertha BSC	2005–06	Bundesliga	12	3	1	0	1	0	5	1	19	4
Hertha BSC	Total		70	16	6	1	1	0	6	1	83	18
Borussia Mönchengladbach	2005–06	Bundesliga	14	3	0	0	—		—		14	3
Borussia Mönchengladbach	2006–07	Bundesliga	19	3	2	0	—		—		21	3
Borussia Mönchengladbach	2007–08	2. Bundesliga	12	3	1	0	—		—		13	3
Borussia Mönchengladbach	Total		35	9	3	0	0	0	0	0	38	9
Borussia Mönchengladbach II	2006–07	Regionalliga Nord	2	0	—		—		—		2	0
Borussia Mönchengladbach II	2007–08	Oberliga Nordrhein	1	0	—		—		—		1	0
Borussia Mönchengladbach II	Total		3	0	0	0	0	0	0		3	0
AGF	2008–09	Danish Superliga	17	5	2	1	—		—		19	6
AGF	2009–10	Danish Superliga	16	5	0	0	—		—		16	5
AGF	Total		33	10	2	1	0	0	0	0	35	1
FC Augsburg (loan)	2009–10	2. Bundesliga	10	4	2	1	—		—		12	5
FC Augsburg	2010–11	2. Bundesliga	27	14	3	4	—		—		30	18
FC Augsburg	2011–12	Bundesliga	6	2	1	0	—		—		7	2
FC Augsburg	Total		33	16	4	4	0	0	0	0	37	20
Fortuna Düsseldorf	2012–13	Bundesliga	11	2	3	1	—		—		14	3
Henan Jianye	2013	China League One	14	7			—		—			
Henan Jianye	2014	Chinese Super League	21	3			—		—			
Henan Jianye	Total		35	10			0	0	0	0		
VfL Bochum	2015–16	2. Bundesliga	8	1	0	0	—		—		8	1
Career total			292	88			1	0	6	1		

== Honours ==
Borussia Mönchengladbach

- 2. Bundesliga: 2007–08

Henan Jianye

- China League One: 2013
