= Aleksandar Mladenov =

Bulgarian footballer (born 1982)

Personal information
- Full name: Aleksandar Stoychev Mladenov
- Date of birth: 25 June 1982 (age 44)
- Place of birth: Sofia, Bulgaria
- Height: 1.88 m (6 ft 2 in)
- Position: Attacking midfielder

Youth career
- CSKA Sofia

Senior career*
Years	Team	Apps	(Gls)
1999–2004	Hertha BSC	10	(0)
2004–2005	Karlsruher SC	12	(0)
2005	CSKA Sofia	2	(0)
2006–2008	Tom Tomsk	43	(4)
2009	Slavia Sofia	7	(1)
2010	Krasnodar	3	(0)
2010	Kaliakra Kavarna	5	(0)
2011	Sevastopol	3	(0)
2011	Etar 1924	8	(2)
2012	Lokomotiv Sofia	2	(0)
Total		95	(7)

International career
- Bulgaria U21

Managerial career
- 2016–2017: Tsarsko Selo (assistant)
- * Club domestic league appearances and goals

Aleksandar Stoychev Mladenov (Bulgarian: Александър Стойчев Младенов; born 25 June 1982) is a Bulgarian former professional footballer who played as a midfielder. He is the son of Stoycho Mladenov.

== Career ==
Mladenov was born in Sofia.

He played in Germany for Hertha BSC and Karlsruher SC and in Russia for Tom Tomsk.

On 25 March 2010, Mladenov signed a one-year contract with FC Krasnodar.
