= 2005–06 Hertha BSC season =

Hertha BSC
2005–06 season
- Stadium: Olympiastadion
- Bundesliga: 6th
- DFB-Pokal: Round of 16
- UEFA Cup: Round of 32
- Top goalscorer: Marcelinho (12)
Home colours	Away colours

The 2005–06 season was the 114th season in the existence of Hertha BSC and the club's fourth consecutive season in the top flight of German football. In addition to the domestic league, Hertha BSC participated in this season's edition of the DFB-Pokal. The season covered the period from 1 July 2005 to 30 June 2006.

== Competitions ==
=== Overall record ===
Competition	First match	Last match	Starting round	Final position	Record							
Competition	First match	Last match	Starting round	Final position	Pld	W	D	L	GF	GA	GD	Win %
Bundesliga	6 August 2005	May 2006	Matchday 1	6th	34	12	12	10	52	48	+4	35.29
DFB-Pokal	20 August 2005	21 December 2005	First round	Round of 16	3	2	0	1	9	6	+3	66.67
Total					37	14	12	11	61	54	+7	37.84

Source: Competitions

=== Bundesliga ===
==== League table ====
Pos	Team	Pld	W	D	L	GF	GA	GD	Pts	Qualification or relegation
4	Schalke 04	34	16	13	5	47	31	+16	61	Qualification to UEFA Cup first round
5	Bayer Leverkusen	34	14	10	10	64	49	+15	52	Qualification to UEFA Cup first round
6	Hertha BSC	34	12	12	10	52	48	+4	48	Qualification to Intertoto Cup third round
7	Borussia Dortmund	34	11	13	10	45	42	+3	46	
8	1. FC Nürnberg	34	12	8	14	49	51	−2	44	

Source: kicker.de
Rules for classification: 1) points; 2) goal difference; 3) number of goals scored.

==== Results summary ====
Overall								Home						Away					
Pld	W	D	L	GF	GA	GD	Pts	W	D	L	GF	GA	GD	W	D	L	GF	GA	GD
34	12	12	10	52	48	+4	48	8	5	4	30	22	+8	4	7	6	22	26	−4

Source: DFB

==== Results by round ====
Round	1	2	3	4	5	6	7	8	9	10	11	12	13	14	15	16	17	18	19	20	21	22	23	24	25	26	27	28	29	30	31	32	33	34
Ground	A	H	A	H	A	H	A	H	A	H	A	H	A	H	A	A	H	H	A	H	A	H	A	H	A	H	A	H	A	H	A	H	H	A
Result	D	W	L	W	D	W	W	L	L	W	D	W	L	D	W	L	D	D	D	D	D	L	L	L	W	W	D	W	W	D	D	L	W	L
Position																																		

Source: DFB
A = Away; H = Home; W = Win; D = Draw; L = Loss

==== Matches ====
6 August 2005 1	Hannover 96	2–2	Hertha BSC
CEST (UTC+2)

13 August 2005 2	Hertha BSC	2–0	Eintracht Frankfurt
CEST (UTC+2)

27 August 2005 3	Bayern Munich	3–0	Hertha BSC
CEST (UTC+2)

11 September 2005 4	Hertha BSC	3–0	VfL Wolfsburg
CEST (UTC+2)

18 September 2005 5	Schalke 04	0–0	Hertha BSC
CEST (UTC+2)

21 September 2005 6	Hertha BSC	3–2	MSV Duisburg
CEST (UTC+2)

25 September 2005 7	1. FC Köln	0–1	Hertha BSC
CEST (UTC+2)

1 October 2005 8	Hertha BSC	1–2	Werder Bremen
CEST (UTC+2)

15 October 2005 9	Arminia Bielefeld	3–0	Hertha BSC
CEST (UTC+2)

22 October 2005 10	Hertha BSC	3–1	Mainz 05
CEST (UTC+2)

29 October 2005 11	VfB Stuttgart	3–3	Hertha BSC
CEST (UTC+2)

5 November 2005 12	Hertha BSC	3–0	1. FC Kaiserslautern
CEST (UTC+2)

19 November 2005 13	Borussia Dortmund	2–0	Hertha BSC
CEST (UTC+2)

27 November 2005 14	Hertha BSC	2–2	Borussia Mönchengladbach
CEST (UTC+2)

4 December 2005 15	Bayer Leverkusen	1–2	Hertha BSC
CEST (UTC+2)

10 December 2005 16	Hamburger SV	2–1	Hertha BSC
CEST (UTC+2)

18 December 2005 17	Hertha BSC	1–1	1. FC Nürnberg
CEST (UTC+2)

28 January 2006 18	Hertha BSC	1–1	Hannover 96
CEST (UTC+2)

4 February 2006 19	Eintracht Frankfurt	1–1	Hertha BSC
CEST (UTC+2)

7 February 2006 20	Hertha BSC	0–0	Bayern Munich
CEST (UTC+2)

11 February 2006 21	VfL Wolfsburg	1–1	Hertha BSC
CEST (UTC+2)

18 February 2006 22	Hertha BSC	1–2	Schalke 04
CEST (UTC+2)

26 February 2006 23	MSV Duisburg	2–1	Hertha BSC
CEST (UTC+2)

4 March 2006 24	Hertha BSC	2–4	1. FC Köln
CEST (UTC+2)

11 March 2006 25	Werder Bremen	0–3	Hertha BSC
CEST (UTC+2)

19 March 2006 26	Hertha BSC	1–0	Arminia Bielefeld
CEST (UTC+2)

25 March 2006 27	Mainz 05	2–2	Hertha BSC
CEST (UTC+2)

1 April 2006 28	Hertha BSC	2–0	VfB Stuttgart
CEST (UTC+2)

8 April 2006 29	1. FC Kaiserslautern	0–2	Hertha BSC
CEST (UTC+2)

15 April 2006 30	Hertha BSC	0–0	Borussia Dortmund
CEST (UTC+2)

22 April 2006 31	Borussia Mönchengladbach	2–2	Hertha BSC
CEST (UTC+2)

2 May 2006 32	Hertha BSC	1–5	Bayer Leverkusen
CEST (UTC+2)

6 May 2006 33	Hertha BSC	4–2	Hamburger SV
CEST (UTC+2)

13 May 2006 34	1. FC Nürnberg	2–1	Hertha BSC
CEST (UTC+2)

=== DFB-Pokal ===
20 August 2005 First round	TuS Koblenz	2–3 (a.e.t.)	Hertha BSC	Koblenz
18:45 CEST (UTC+2)				Stadium: Stadion Oberwerth; Attendance: 14,800; Referee: Lutz Wagner

26 October 2005 Second round	Hertha BSC	3–0	Borussia Mönchengladbach	Berlin
19:30 CEST (UTC+2)				Stadium: Olympiastadion; Attendance: 25,100; Referee: Florian Meyer

21 December 2005 Round of 16	FC St. Pauli	4–3 (a.e.t.)	Hertha BSC	Hamburg
19:00 CEST (UTC+2)				Stadium: Millerntorstadion; Attendance: 19,800; Referee: Knut Kircher

== Statistics ==
=== Goalscorers ===
Rank	No.	Pos	Nat	Name	Bundesliga	DFB-Pokal	Coupe de la Ligue	Total
1	25	DF	(Germany)	[[]]	0	0	0	0
1	8	MF	(Germany)	[[]]	0	0	0	0
1	17	MF	(Germany)	[[]]	0	0	0	0
1	27	FW	(Germany)	[[]]	0	0	0	0
Totals					0	0	0	0
