= Dick van Burik =

Dutch footballer (born 1973)

Personal information
- Full name: Dick van Burik
- Date of birth: 29 November 1973 (age 52)
- Place of birth: Utrecht, Netherlands
- Height: 1.86 m (6 ft 1 in)
- Position: Defender

Youth career
- Ultraejectum Utrecht
- DSO Zoetermeer
- Elinkwijk Utrecht
- 1991–1992: Ajax

Senior career*
Years	Team	Apps	(Gls)
1992–1993	Ajax	3	(0)
1993–1996	NAC	72	(3)
1996–1997	Utrecht	26	(3)
1997–2007	Hertha BSC	245	(7)
Total		346	(13)

Managerial career
- 2010: SC Heerenveen (assistant)
- * Club domestic league appearances and goals

Dick van Burik (born 29 November 1973) is a retired Dutch professional footballer who played as a central defender. Van Burik had three children during his football career: Dominique, Michele, and Estelle van Burik.

== Club career ==
Born in Utrecht, Van Burik played in the Eredivisie with Ajax, NAC and FC Utrecht.

However, he is best known for a 10-year stint with German Bundesliga outfit Hertha BSC, where he would be a defensive mainstay and captain for a side that participated in five UEFA Cup editions and the 1999–2000 UEFA Champions League (as a result of a third league place in 1998–99, with Van Burik subsequently appearing in ten Champions League contests, as Hertha reached the second group stage).

Van Burik was dismissed by Hertha after the club accused him of playing a role in the departure of teammate Jérôme Boateng, who was a client of Van Burik's father and football agent Karel. Despite receiving interest from various clubs, he ultimately chose to retire as a professional football player in June 2007, at the age of 33.

== Retirement ==
He served as the assistant manager at SC Heerenveen from February to June 2010. At present, Van Burik runs an international football agency, EuroSoccerAdvice, and is the proprietor of a protective coating company, VB Coatings.
