= Marcelinho Paraíba =

Brazilian footballer

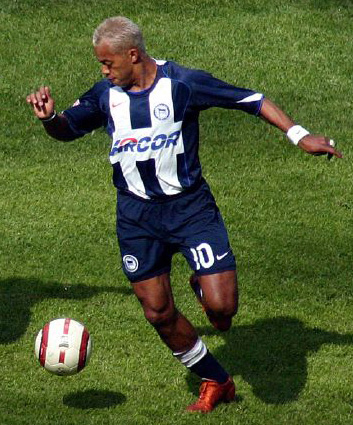
- Marcelinho playing for Hertha BSC in 2005

Personal information
- Full name: Marcelo dos Santos
- Date of birth: 17 May 1975 (age 51)
- Place of birth: Campina Grande, Brazil
- Height: 1.74 m (5 ft 9 in)
- Position: Attacking midfielder

Senior career*
Years	Team	Apps	(Gls)
1991–1993	Campinense	16	(3)
1994	Paraguaçuense	28	(7)
1994	→ Santos (loan)	7	(0)
1995–1997	Rio Branco-SP	42	(7)
1997–2000	São Paulo	60	(15)
2000	Marseille	19	(3)
2001	Grêmio	49	(23)
2001–2006	Hertha BSC	155	(65)
2006	Trabzonspor	17	(2)
2007–2008	VfL Wolfsburg	51	(12)
2008–2009	Flamengo	7	(8)
2009	Coritiba	34	(14)
2010–2011	São Paulo	8	(1)
2010	→ Sport Recife (loan)	23	(6)
2011–2012	Sport Recife	33	(12)
2012	Grêmio Barueri	19	(3)
2012–2013	Boa Esporte	33	(5)
2014	Fortaleza	19	(2)
2015	Inter de Lages	17	(9)
2015	Joinville	32	(5)
2016	Oeste	14	(4)
2016	Inter de Lages	9	(3)
2016	→ Ypiranga-RS (loan)	4	(2)
2017	Treze	4	(4)
2017–2018	Portuguesa	6	(0)
2018	Treze	13	(5)
2018–2019	Perilima	2	(2)
2019	Treze	16	(3)
2020	Perilima	3	(0)
2020	Treze	2	(0)
Total		742	(225)

International career
2001	Brazil	5	(1)

Managerial career
- 2021: Treze
- 2021: Sport Lagoa Seca
- 2022: Oeirense
- 2022: Treze
- 2022–2023: Serra Branca
- * Club domestic league appearances and goals

Marcelo dos Santos (born 17 May 1975), commonly known as Marcelinho or Marcelinho Paraíba, is a Brazilian professional football coach and former player who played as an attacking midfielder. The suffix "Paraíba" refers to his home state in Brazil, distinguishing him from other footballers sharing the nickname.

During his playing career, Marcelinho was widely regarded as a highly creative playmaker, recognized for his vision, dribbling skills, and set-piece ability. He spent his most notable years in the German Bundesliga, primarily with Hertha BSC, where he became a club icon and won two DFB-Ligapokal titles, before later captaining VfL Wolfsburg. At international level, he earned five caps and scored one goal for the Brazil national football team.

In addition, he is also one of a select number of players who have amassed over 1,100 career appearances.

== Career ==
Born in Campina Grande, Paraíba, Marcelinho began his career in Campinense, where he won two league titles there. Between 1994 and 1995, he played for Santos. Two years later, however, he made his breakthrough at São Paulo, where he won two Paulistões before being sold to Olympique de Marseille.

He only spent a year in France, and in 2001 he returned to Brazil to play for Grêmio, where he began to experience the pinnacle of his career. At that time, Marcelinho was called "Marcelinho Paraúcho" by Gremistas, because of his passage in the team. He became champion and top scorer of the Campeonato Gaúcho, and champion of the Copa do Brasil, where he scored a goal in the second game in the final against Corinthians. He did not play in the league that year because he had previously signed a five-year contract with Hertha BSC.

Marcelinho played for Hertha from 2001 to 2006, establishing himself as one of the most important players in the club's history. Operating primarily as a playmaker, he was known for his technical brilliance, vision, and leadership, while also carrying the responsibility for the team's free kicks, corner kicks, and penalties. To help him settle in Germany, Marcelinho relocated a large group of family and friends to live with him in three rented apartments in Berlin.

He made an immediate impact, scoring on his debut and helping Hertha win the 2001 and 2002 DFB-Ligapokal, the club's first major trophies since 1990. His most statistically impressive campaign was the 2004–05 season, where he registered 18 goals and 13 assists, helping Hertha secure a fourth-place finish. Notably, in a match against SC Freiburg, he scored a memorable goal from the center circle. His performances earned him a spot in the Hertha Team of the Century in 2003, and in 2005, he became the first non-German in 39 years to win the Berlin Sportsperson of the Year award.

Despite his on-pitch success, Marcelinho was known for an extravagant off-field lifestyle, frequently partying into the early hours and regularly returning late from winter and summer breaks. While the club's management, particularly vice-president Dieter Hoeneß, tolerated his behavior due to his exceptional fitness and match performances, tensions eventually boiled over. At the beginning of the 2006–07 season, Marcelinho returned from Brazil 11 days late, citing airport runway maintenance. Following a fallout with manager Falko Götz and making contradictory statements regarding his future, he departed the club.

In August 2006, Marcelinho signed a three-year contract with Turkish club Trabzonspor for approximately €2.5 million (£2.5 million). Despite a passionate welcome from the fans, he struggled to adapt to the local football culture. After scoring just two goals in 17 appearances, he left the club after only six months, returning to Germany to sign with VfL Wolfsburg in January 2007. He played one and a half seasons with them.

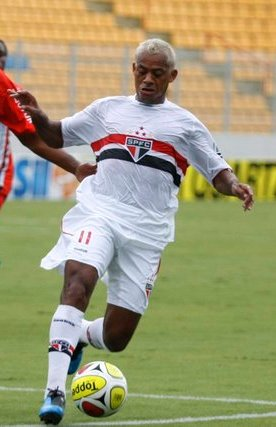
Marcelinho during his second stint with São Paulo in 2010

In August 2008, he returned to Brazil to play for Flamengo. On 6 March 2009, Coritiba signed him on a free transfer until the end of the year, as Marcelinho terminated his contract with Flamengo. After the relegation of Coritiba, he re-signed for São Paulo in December 2009. In August 2010, he was loaned to Sport until the end of the 2010 season, and his contract was extended to the end of the 2011 season.

Marcelinho subsequently embarked on a journeyman career, representing Sport, Boa Esporte, Fortaleza, Internacional de Lages (two stints), Joinville, Oeste, Ypiranga de Erechim, Treze, and Portuguesa.

=== Retirement and return ===
On 15 March 2020, he announced his retirement as a professional player, playing for Perilima against Centro Sportivo Paraibano in the eighth round of the 2020 Campeonato Paraibano; however, eight months later, he changed his mind and rejoined Treze in an effort to help them avoid relegation. He made his first appearance since returning from retirement on 28 November as a half-time substitute in a 1–1 draw with Vila Nova, being substituted himself in the 78th minute.

== International goals ==
No.	Date	Venue	Opponent	Score	Result	Competition
1.	15 August 2001	Estádio Olímpico Monumental, Porto Alegre, Brazil	Paraguay	1–0	2–0	2002 FIFA World Cup qualification

== Managerial career ==
On 10 December 2020, after Treze suffered relegation from the 2020 Campeonato Brasileiro Série C, Marcelinho was appointed manager of the club for the 2021 campaign. Despite a promising start in the 2021 Copa do Nordeste, he could not prevent a drop in performance which saw his side finish fourth in the first stage of the 2021 Campeonato Paraibano, and on 24 May 2021 he was dismissed. He joined Sport-PB as manager in September 2021. He was in role for only 15 days before resigning due to off-field problems. In late October 2021, Marcelinho was announced as the coach of Oeirense for the 2022 season. He was sacked in February 2022 after just six games following a heavy defeat. On 11 March 2022, he was announced as the coach of Treze for a second time.

== Honours ==
Campinense

- Campeonato Paraibano: 1991, 1993

São Paulo

- Campeonato Paulista: 1998, 2000

Grêmio

- Campeonato Gaúcho: 2001
- Copa do Brasil: 2001

Hertha BSC

- DFB-Ligapokal: 2001, 2002

Boa Esporte

- Taça Minas Gerais: 2012

Individual

- kicker Bundesliga Team of the Season: 2002–03, 2004–05
- Bola de Prata: 2009

== See also ==
- List of men's footballers with the most official appearances
