= 2006–07 Hertha BSC season =

German football club season

Hertha BSC
2006–07 season
- President: Bernd Schiphorst
- Manager: Falko Götz (until 10 April); Karsten Heine (from 11 April)
- Bundesliga: 10th
- DFB-Pokal: Quarterfinals
- DFL-Ligapokal: Preliminary round
- UEFA Intertoto Cup: Co-winner
- UEFA Cup: First round
- Top goalscorer: League: Marko Pantelić (14 goals); All: Marko Pantelić; Christian Giménez (14 goals)
- Highest home attendance: 74,220 vs. Bayern/Werder
- Lowest home attendance: 3,500 vs. Moskva
Home colours	Away colours

Hertha BSC's 2006–07 season began on 16 July, with their UEFA Intertoto Cup match against FC Moscow, and ended on 19 May, with their Bundesliga match against Eintracht Frankfurt. They were one of 11 winners of the UEFA Intertoto Cup. In the UEFA Cup, and in the DFB-Ligapokal they were eliminated in the first round. They made it as far as the quarter-finals of the DFB-Pokal, and finished tenth in the Bundesliga.

== Players ==
=== First-team squad ===
Squad at end of season

Note: Flags indicate national team as defined under FIFA eligibility rules; some limited exceptions apply. Players may hold more than one non-FIFA nationality.

No.	Pos.	Nation	Player
3	DF	GER	Arne Friedrich
4	DF	NED	Dick van Burik
5	DF	GER	Sofian Chahed (Note: Chahed was born in West Berlin, West Germany (now Berlin, Germany), and represented Germany at U-19 and U-20 level, but also qualified to represent Tunisia internationally and made his debut for Tunisia in October 2009.)
6	DF	BRA	Gilberto
7	MF	TUR	Yıldıray Baştürk (Note: Baştürk was born in Herne, West Germany (now Germany), but also qualified to represent Turkey internationally and made his debut for Turkey in 1998.)
8	MF	HUN	Pál Dárdai
9	FW	SRB	Marko Pantelić
11	FW	NED	Ellery Cairo
12	GK	GER	Christian Fiedler
13	FW	ARG	Christian Giménez (on loan from Marseille)
14	DF	CRO	Josip Šimunić (Note: Šimunić was born in Canberra, Australia, but also qualified to represent Croatia and Bosnia and Herzegovina internationally through his parents and made his international debut for Croatia in November 2001.)
15	MF	BRA	Mineiro
16	MF	GER	Ashkan Dejagah (Note: Dejagah was born in Tehran, Iran, but was raised in Germany from the age of 1 and represented Germany at U-17, U-18, U-19, U-20 and U-21 level before making his international debut for Iran in February 2012.)
17	MF	GER	Kevin-Prince Boateng (Note: Boateng was born in West Berlin, West Germany (now Berlin, Germany), and represented Germany at U-19, U-20 and U-21 level, but also qualified to represent Ghana internationally through his father and made his international debut for Ghana in June 2010.)

No.	Pos.	Nation	Player
18	FW	CRO	Srđan Lakić
20	MF	GER	Andreas Neuendorf
23	DF	DEN	Dennis Cagara (Note: Cagara was born in Glostrup, Denmark, and represented Denmark at U-16, U-17, U-18, U-19, U-20, and U-21 level, but also qualified to represent the Philippines internationally through his father and made his international debut for the Philippines in October 2011.)
27	DF	GER	Amadeus Wallschläger
29	DF	GER	Malik Fathi
31	DF	GER	Andreas Schmidt
32	DF	GER	Robert Müller
33	GK	DEN	Kevin Stuhr Ellegaard
37	MF	GER	Christian Müller
38	MF	GER	Patrick Ebert
39	MF	GER	Chinedu Ede
40	GK	GER	Nico Pellatz
41	DF	GER	Jérôme Boateng
43	DF	GER	Christopher Schorch

== Transfers ==
=== Summer ===
In: Note: Flags indicate national team as defined under FIFA eligibility rules; some limited exceptions apply. Players may hold more than one non-FIFA nationality.

No.	Pos.	Nation	Player
9	FW	SRB	Marko Pantelić (from Red Star Belgrade, previously on loan)
13	FW	ARG	Christian Giménez (on loan from Marseille)
18	FW	CRO	Srđan Lakić (from Kamen Ingrad)
23	DF	DEN	Dennis Cagara (loan return from Dynamo Dresden)
27	DF	GER	Amadeus Wallschläger (from Hertha BSC II)
32	DF	GER	Robert Müller (from Hertha BSC II)
38	MF	GER	Patrick Ebert (from Hertha BSC II)
39	DF	GER	Chinedu Ede (from Hertha BSC II)
40	GK	GER	Nico Pellatz (from Hertha BSC II)
43	DF	GER	Christopher Schorch (from Hertha BSC II)

Out: Note: Flags indicate national team as defined under FIFA eligibility rules; some limited exceptions apply. Players may hold more than one non-FIFA nationality.

No.	Pos.	Nation	Player
—	MF	GER	Thorben Marx (to Arminia Bielefeld)
—	MF	GER	Oliver Schröder (to Bochum)
—	MF	GER	Alexander Ludwig (to Dynamo Dresden, previously on loan)
—	GK	GER	Gerhard Tremmel (to Energie Cottbus)
—	MF	BRA	Marcelinho (to Trabzonspor)
—	MF	BIH	Sejad Salihović (to 1899 Hoffenheim)
—	DF	GER	Alexander Madlung (to Wolfsburg)
—	DF	GER	Pascal Bieler (on loan to Rot-Weiss Essen)
—	FW	CZE	Václav Svěrkoš (to Borussia Mönchengladbach)

=== Winter ===
In: Note: Flags indicate national team as defined under FIFA eligibility rules; some limited exceptions apply. Players may hold more than one non-FIFA nationality.

No.	Pos.	Nation	Player
41	DF	GER	Jérôme Boateng (from Hertha BSC II)

Out: Note: Flags indicate national team as defined under FIFA eligibility rules; some limited exceptions apply. Players may hold more than one non-FIFA nationality.

No.	Pos.	Nation	Player
21	FW	NGR	Solomon Okoronkwo (on loan to Rot-Weiss Essen)
35	DF	CGO	Christopher Samba (Note: Samba was born in Créteil, France, but also qualified to represent the Congo internationally and made his international debut for the Congo in September 2004.) (to Blackburn Rovers)

== Statistics ==
=== Goalscorers ===
Player	Bundesliga	DFB-Pokal	UEFA Intertoto Cup	UEFA Cup	DFB-Ligapokal	Total
(Argentina) Christian Giménez	12	2	0	1	0	15
(Serbia) Marko Pantelić	14	0	1	0	0	15
(Brazil) Gilberto	5	0	0	0	0	5
(Turkey) Yıldıray Baştürk	1	2	1	0	0	4
(Hungary) Pál Dárdai	3	0	0	0	0	3
(Germany) Kevin-Prince Boateng	2	0	0	1	0	3
(Germany) Arne Friedrich	2	0	0	0	0	2
(Netherlands) Dick van Burik	2	0	0	0	0	2
(Germany) Patrick Ebert	2	0	0	0	0	2
(Germany) Malik Fathi	1	1	0	0	0	2
(Nigeria) Solomon Okoronkwo	0	1	0	1	0	2
(Germany) Chinedu Ede	1	0	0	0	0	1
(Germany) Andreas Neuendorf	1	0	0	0	0	1
(Germany) Ashkan Dejagah	1	0	0	0	0	1
(Brazil) Mineiro	1	0	0	0	0	1
(Germany) Andreas Schmidt	1	0	0	0	0	1
(Croatia) Josip Šimunić	1	0	0	0	0	1

== Results ==
=== Intertoto Cup ===
==== Third round ====
15 July 2006	Hertha BSC	0–0	FC Moscow	Friedrich-Ludwig-Jahn-Sportpark, Berlin
15:00 CET				Attendance: 8,404; Referee: Mark Clattenburg (England)

22 July 2006	FC Moscow	0–2	Hertha BSC	Eduard Streltsov Stadium, Moscow
17:30 CET			Pantelić 25'; Baştürk 88'	Attendance: 3,500; Referee: Bülent Demirlek (Turkey)

=== DFB-Ligapokal ===
==== First round ====
29 July 2006	Hamburger SV	1–0	Hertha BSC	LTU Arena, Düsseldorf
15:30 CET	Kompany 52'			Attendance: 15,000; Referee: Pieter Vink (Netherlands)

=== UEFA Cup ===
==== Second qualifying round ====
10 August 2006	Hertha BSC	1–0	Ameri Tbilisi	Friedrich-Ludwig-Jahn Sportpark, Berlin
19:00	Okoronkwo 90+1'			Attendance: 7,377; Referee: Christoforos Zografos (Greece)

24 August	Ameri Tbilisi	2–2	Hertha BSC	Mikheil Meskhi Stadium, Tbilisi
19:00 CET	Davitnidze 19', 47'		Lakić 34'; Pantelić 88'	Attendance: 5,000; Referee: Pavel Olsiak (Slovakia)

==== First round ====
14 September 2006	Hertha BSC	2–2	Odense BK	Olympiastadion, Berlin
17:00 CET	Giménez 38'; K. Boateng 50'		Šimunić 7' (o.g.); Bechara 53'	Attendance: 12,814; Referee: Viktor Kassai (Hungary)

28 September	Odense BK	1–0	Hertha BSC	Fionia Park, Odense
15:30 CET	Timm 62'			Attendance: 11,466; Referee: Iain Brines (Scotland)

=== DFB-Pokal ===
==== First round ====
10 September 2006	Darmstadt 98	0–1	Hertha BSC	Stadion am Böllenfalltor, Darmstadt
17:00 CET			Baştürk 109'	Attendance: 14,700; Referee: Christian Dingert (Lichtenberg)

==== Second round ====
25 October 2006	Stuttgarter Kickers	0–2	Hertha BSC	GAZi Stadion, Stuttgart
20:00 CET			Okoronkwo 58'; Baştürk 74'	Attendance: 10,500; Referee: Michael Weiner (Ottenstein)

==== Third round ====
19 December 2006	VfL Osnabrück	0–3	Hertha BSC	Osnatel-Arena, Osnabrück
20:30 CET			Malik Fathi 34'; Giménez 41', 51'	Attendance: 18,300; Referee: Throsten Kinhöfer (Constantin)

==== Quarterfinal ====
28 February 2007	VfB Stuttgart	2–0	Hertha BSC	Gottlieb-Daimler-Stadion, Stuttgart
21:30 CET	Cacau 38'; Hitzlsperger 77'			Attendance: 32,000; Referee: Markus Merk (Kaiserslautern)

=== Bundesliga ===
13 August 2006 1	VfL Wolfsburg	0–0	Hertha BSC	Volkswagen Arena, Wolfsburg
17:00 CET				Attendance: 23,496; Referee: Thorsten Kinhöfer (Constatin)

19 August 2006 2	Hertha BSC	4–0	Hannover 96	Olympiastadion, Berlin
15:30 CET	Pantelić 20', 63'; Dárdai 31'; Ebert 77'			Attendance: 37,166; Referee: Dr. Jochen Drees (Münster)

27 August 2006 3	Hamburger SV	1–1	Hertha BSC	HSH Nordbank Arena, Hamburg
17:00 CET	Sanogo 18'		Giménez 64'	Attendance: 53,989; Referee: Herbert Fandel (Utscheid)

17 September 4	Hertha BSC	2–0	Schalke 04	Olympiastadion, Berlin
17:00 CET	Giménez 34', 52'			Attendance: 60,547; Referee: Peter Gagelmann (Bremen)

23 September 5	Mainz 05	1–1	Hertha BSC	Stadion am Bruchweg, Mainz
15:30 CET	Diakité 49'		K. Boateng 56'	Attendance: 20,300; Referee: Knut Kircher (Hirschau)

1 October 2006 6	Hertha BSC	2–2	VfB Stuttgart	Olympiastadion, Berlin
17:00 CET	Friedrich 9'; Pantelić 14'		Gómez 4'; Cacau 57'	Attendance: 48,673; Referee: Thorsten Kinhöfer (Constantin)

14 October 2006 7	Bayern Munich	4–2	Hertha BSC	Allianz Arena, Munich
15:30 CET	Makaay 9'; Sagnol 15'; Pizzaro 53'; Podolski 78'		Fathi 58'; Pantelić 73'	Attendance: 69,000; Referee: Babak Rafati (Döhren)

21 October 2006 8	Hertha BSC	2–1	Borussia Mönchengladbach	Olympiastadion, Berlin
15:30 CET	Dárdai 50'; Pantelić 73'		Neuville 63'	Attendance: 43,604; Referee: Markus Merk (Kaiserslautern)

28 October 2006 9	Energie Cottbus	2–0	Hertha BSC	Stadion der Freundschaft, Cottbus
15:30	Gunkel 66'; Shao 83'			Attendance: 20,000; Referee: Lutz Wagner (Kritfel)

4 November 2006 10	Hertha BSC	2–1	1. FC Nürnberg	Olympiastadion, Berlin
15:30 CET	Pantelić 29', 65'		Banović 47'	Attendance: 41,162; Referee: Florian Meyer (Braunschweig)

8 November 2006 11	Arminia Bielefeld	2–2	Hertha BSC	Bielefelder Alm, Bielefeld
20:00 CET	Zuma 28'; Kučera 76'		Gilberto 45'; Giménez 59'	Attendance: 21,075; Referee: Michael Kempter (Sauldorf)

11 November 2006 12	Hertha BSC	3–3	VfL Bochum	Olympiastadion, Berlin
15:30 CET	Pantelić 9'; Van Burik 58'; Zecke 80'		Gekas 30'; Misimović 45+1', 47'	Attendance: 29,104; Referee: Dr. Felix Brych (Munich)

18 November 2006 13	Borussia Dortmund	1–2	Hertha BSC	Signal Iduna Park, Dortmund
15:30 CET	Frei 23' (pen.)		Schmidt 10'; Gilberto 16'	Attendance: 70,200; Referee: Knut Kircher (Hirschau)

25 November 2006 14	Hertha BSC	2–1	Alemannia Aachen	Olympiastadion, Berlin
15:30 CET	Pantelić 41'; Dejagah 62'		Lehmann 45'	Attendance: 40,879; Referee: Günter Perl (Munich)

2 December 2006 15	Werder Bremen	3–1	Hertha BSC	Weserstadion, Bremen
15:30 CET	Diego 24' (pen.); Klose 32', 40'		Šimunić 25'	Attendance: 40,168; Referee: Herbert Fandel (Utscheid)

8 December 2006 16	Bayer Leverkusen	2–1	Hertha BSC	BayArena, Leverkusen
20:30 CET	Freier 33'; Babić 80'		Pantelić 22'	Attendance: 22,500; Referee: Dr. Felix Brych (Munich)

16 December 2006 17	Hertha BSC	1–0	Eintracht Frankfurt	Olympiastadion, Berlin
15:30 CET	Giménez 63'			Attendance: 42,549; Referee: Marc Seeman (Frintrop)

27 January 2007 18	Hertha BSC	2–1	VfL Wolfsburg	Olympiastadion, Berlin
15:30 CET	Giménez 27'; Pantelić 86'		Madlung 18'	Attendance: 40,272; Referee: Dr. Felix Brych (Munich)

31 January 2007 19	Hannover 96	5–0	Hertha BSC	AWD-Arena, Hannover
20:00 CET	Vinícius 16', 37'; Fahrenhorst 45'; Rosenthal 64'; Lala 76'			Attendance: 30,584; Referee: Markus Schmidt (Sillenbuch)

3 February 2007 20	Hertha BSC	2–1	Hamburger SV	Olympiastadion, Berlin
15:30 CET	Friedrich 78'; Mineiro 90+2'		Laas 33'	Attendance: 47,354; Referee: Thorsten Kinhöfer (Constantin)

10 February 2007 21	Schalke 04	2–0	Hertha BSC	Veltins-Arena, Gelsenkirchen
15:30 CET	Kurányi 64'; Løvenkrands 75'			Attendance: 61,482; Referee: Michael Weiner (Ottenstein)

17 February 2007 22	Hertha BSC	1–2	Mainz 05	Olympiastadion, Berlin
15:30 CET	Dárdai 22'		Zidan 54' (pen.); Andreasen 64'	Attendance: 35,473; Referee: Peter Sippel (Würzburg)

23 February 2007 23	VfB Stuttgart	0–0	Hertha BSC	Gottlieb-Daimler-Stadion, Stuttgart
20:30 CET				Attendance: 45,000; Referee: Florian Meyer (Braunschweig)

3 March 2007 24	Hertha BSC	2–3	Bayern Munich	Olympiastadion, Berlin
15:30 CET	Giménez 58'; Van Burik 82'		Salihamidžić 30'; Podolski 31'; Makaay 68'	Attendance: 74,220; Referee: Herbert Fandel (Utscheid)

10 March 2007 25	Borussia Mönchengladbach	3–1	Hertha BSC	Borussia Park, Mönchengladbach
15:30 CET	Rafael 32', 69'; Delura 86'		Giménez 56'	Attendance: 40,518; Referee: Günter Perl (Munich)

16 March 2007 26	Hertha BSC	0–1	Energie Cottbus	Olympiastadion, Berlin
20:30 CET			Radu 47'	Attendance: 51,831; Referee: Dr. Jochen Drees (Münster)

31 March 2007 27	1. FC Nürnberg	2–1	Hertha BSC	Easy-Credit Stadion, Nuremberg
15:30 CET	Galásek 4'; Engelhardt 60'		Giménez 69'	Attendance: 45,694; Referee: Babak Rafati (Döhren)

4 April 2007 28	Hertha BSC	1–1	Arminia Bielefeld	Olympiastadion, Berlin
15:30 CET	Ebert 71'		Kučera 19'	Attendance: 41,512; Referee: Dr. Felix Brych (Munich)

14 April 2007 29	VfL Bochum	1–3	Hertha BSC	rewirpowerSTADION, Bochum
15:30 CET	Gekas 1'		Giménez 58'; Gilberto 66'; Ede 90'	Attendance: 27,181; Referee: Günter Perl (Munich)

21 April 2007 30	Hertha BSC	0–1	Borussia Dortmund	Olympiastadion, Berlin
15:30			Brzenska 50'	Attendance: 64,382; Referee: Peter Sippel (Würzburg)

28 April 2007 31	Alemannia Aachen	0–4	Hertha BSC	Tivoli, Aachen
15:30 CET			Gilberto 7'; Giménez 48'; Pantelić 77'; Baştürk 80'	Attendance: 20,800; Referee: Markus Merk (Kaiserslautern

6 May 2007 32	Hertha BSC	1–4	Werder Bremen	Olympiastadion, Berlin
17:00 CET	Gilberto 61'		Rosenberg 19', 50', 82'; Diego 60'	Attendance: 74,220; Referee: Herbert Fandel (Utscheid)

12 May 2007 33	Hertha BSC	2–3	Bayer Leverkusen	Olympiastadion, Berlin
15:30 CET	Pantelić 32'; Giménez 51'		Callsen-Bracker 13'; Voronin 34'; Schneider 64' (pen.)	Attendance: 50,000; Referee: Wolfgang Stark (Altdorf)

19 May 2007 34	Eintracht Frankfurt	1–2	Hertha BSC	Commerzbank Arena, Frankfurt
15:30 CET	Streit 61'		K. Boateng 48'; Pantelić 87'	Attendance: 50,500; Referee: Günter Perl (Munich)
