= Kevin-Prince Boateng =

Footballer (born 1987)

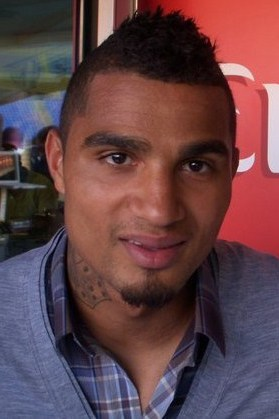
- Boateng in 2011

Personal information
- Full name: Kevin-Prince Boateng
- Date of birth: 6 March 1987 (age 39)
- Place of birth: West Berlin, West Germany
- Height: 1.86 m (6 ft 1 in)
- Positions: Midfielder; forward

Youth career
- 1994: Reinickendorfer Füchse
- 1994–1995: Hertha BSC
- 1995–1996: Reinickendorfer Füchse
- 1996–2004: Hertha BSC

Senior career*
Years	Team	Apps	(Gls)
2004–2007	Hertha BSC II	59	(11)
2005–2007	Hertha BSC	53	(5)
2007–2009	Tottenham Hotspur	24	(0)
2009	→ Borussia Dortmund (loan)	11	(0)
2009–2010	Portsmouth	27	(5)
2010–2011	Genoa	0	(0)
2010–2011	→ Milan (loan)	34	(3)
2011–2013	Milan	66	(14)
2013–2015	Schalke 04	60	(7)
2016	Milan	14	(1)
2016–2017	Las Palmas	29	(10)
2017–2018	Eintracht Frankfurt	36	(6)
2018–2019	Sassuolo	15	(5)
2019	→ Barcelona (loan)	4	(0)
2019–2020	Fiorentina	15	(1)
2020	→ Beşiktaş (loan)	11	(3)
2020–2021	Monza	25	(5)
2021–2023	Hertha BSC	38	(0)
Total		521	(76)

International career
2004–2005	Germany U19	12	(7)
2006	Germany U20	2	(0)
2006–2009	Germany U21	6	(0)
2010–2014	Ghana	15	(2)
- * Club domestic league appearances and goals

Kevin-Prince Boateng (German: [ˈkɛvɪn ˈpʁɪns boaˈtɛŋ]; born 6 March 1987) is a football manager and former player.

Coming through the youth system, Boateng began his career at Hertha BSC, before joining Tottenham Hotspur in England. After a short loan spell with Borussia Dortmund, Boateng moved to Portsmouth. In 2010 he joined Serie A side AC Milan, winning both the league and Supercoppa Italiana titles in his first season. Boateng left Milan after three seasons, returning to Germany joining Schalke 04. In January 2016 he returned to Milan, remaining for six months, before moving to Spanish club Las Palmas. Boateng made his third return to Germany in 2017, playing for Eintracht Frankfurt, before joining Italian side Sassuolo. After a short loan to Barcelona, with whom he won a La Liga title, he moved back to Italy, joining Fiorentina. In January 2020 he was sent on a six-month loan to Turkish side Beşiktaş, and in September 2020 he moved to Monza.

Boateng represented his country of birth, Germany, internationally at youth level; he opted to represent Ghana at senior level 15 times between 2010 and 2014—scoring two goals—and represented them at the 2010 and 2014 FIFA World Cups.

== Early life and education ==
Kevin-Prince Boateng was born on 6 March 1987 in Berlin, West Germany. He grew up in Wedding. His mother, Christine Rahn, is German and his father is from Ghana. Boateng stated that his father abandoned him in childhood and his mother raised five children.

Boateng is the older, paternal half-brother of fellow professional footballer Jérôme Boateng. He is the nephew of Yaw Boateng Gyan, a former national organiser of the National Democratic Congress political party in Ghana.

== Club career ==
=== Reinickendorfer Füchse ===
Boateng started his club career with the club Reinickendorfer Füchse in early 1994 at age six prior to signing for Hertha BSC on 1 July 1994, at the age of seven, first playing for them until 31 July 2007, when he was 20 years old.

=== Hertha BSC II ===
After emerging from the Hertha feeder teams, Boateng played for Hertha BSC II for two seasons. He was promoted to the Hertha first team squad in the 2005–06 season.

=== Hertha BSC ===
Boateng made his first team debut in a 2–0 win against Eintracht Frankfurt in the second round of the 2005–06 Bundesliga season on 13 August 2005, at the Olympic Stadium, being brought on at the beginning of the second half.

Boateng was awarded the Fritz Walter Bronze Medal Award in the Under-18 category in 2005. Boateng started his first Bundesliga match in a 2–2 draw against Borussia Mönchengladbach in the 14th round of the Bundesliga season.

On 27 July 2006, Boateng was awarded the Fritz Walter Gold Medal in the Under-19 category.

=== Tottenham Hotspur ===
Boateng signed a four-year contract with Tottenham Hotspur in July 2007 for a reported £5.4 million, securing him ahead of UEFA Cup holders Sevilla. His success at the club was limited, and he was loaned to Borussia Dortmund in January 2009 for the remainder of the season.

==== Borussia Dortmund (loan) ====
He made ten Bundesliga appearances during his loan, but was forced to miss the final two matches of the season for a suspension of four matches imposed by the German Football Association (DFB) following a tough challenge and "no-nonsense flying kick" to the head of VfL Wolfsburg's Makoto Hasebe.

Dortmund were eager to sign Boateng permanently at the end of the season, but financial constraints prevented them from doing so.

=== Portsmouth ===
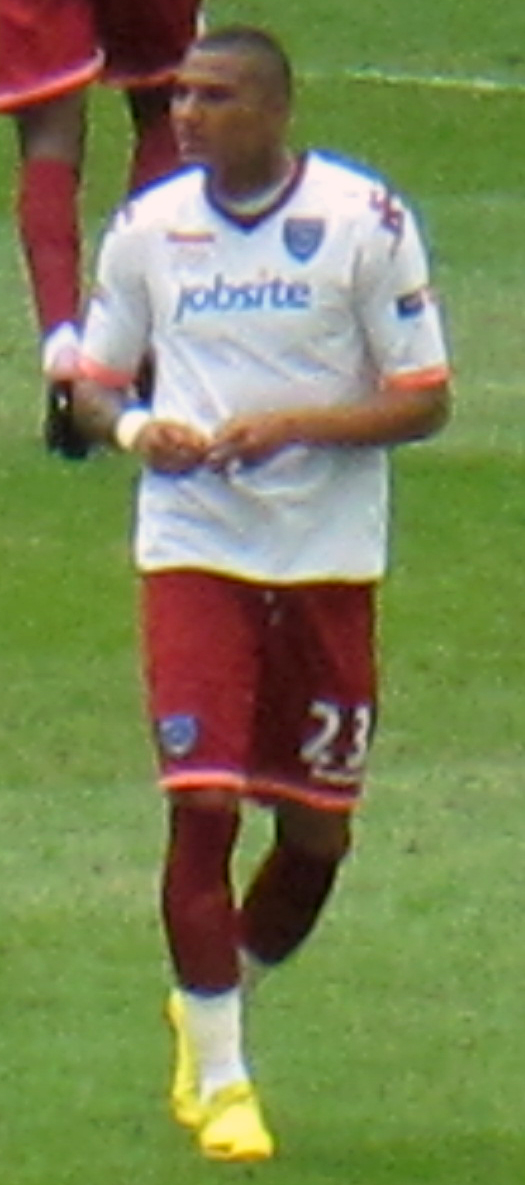
Boateng playing for Portsmouth in the 2010 FA Cup Final

English Premier League club Portsmouth signed Boateng on a three-year contract in August 2009 for a reported fee of around £4 million. On 12 September 2009, he scored his first goal for the club against Bolton Wanderers, and was named Portsmouth's joint Player of the Month. He finished his only season at the club with three goals in 22 Premier League games as they were relegated amidst financial disarray.

In May 2010, Portsmouth played Chelsea in the FA Cup Final, which Chelsea won 1–0. Boateng had his penalty for Portsmouth saved in the 54th minute, four minutes before Didier Drogba scored Chelsea's winning goal. During the match, Boateng fouled Chelsea midfielder Michael Ballack, injuring Ballack's ankle and ruling him out of the impending 2010 World Cup. Boateng claimed that Ballack slapped him in the face prior to this, and that he apologised to Ballack personally for the tackle which left him injured.

Boateng called the German media and the German national team players hypocrites for backing Ballack while ignoring his slap on the pitch. Boateng also criticised Joachim Löw for protecting Ballack after he slapped striker Lukas Podolski in a Germany national football team training match the previous year.

=== Genoa and AC Milan ===
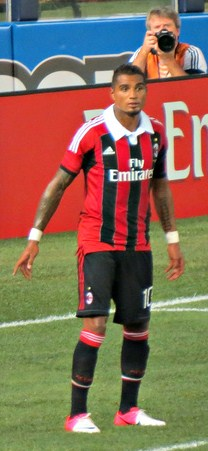
Boateng playing for AC Milan in 2012

On 17 August 2010, Boateng transferred to Italian Serie A club Genoa on a three-year contract for €5.75 million, (a reported €5.7 million plus the transfer of Anthony Vanden Borre, despite the latter deal falling-through) and then immediately joined AC Milan on loan. The deal later became a co-ownership deal in the same transfer window for €5.25 million. Milan signed Boateng permanently from Genoa in June 2011 for €7 million on a four-year contract due to expire in June 2015.

On 23 October 2011, Boateng came on as a half-time substitute against Lecce and scored three goals in 14 minutes. Milan had been 3–0 down at half-time, but went on to win the game 4–3. Boateng is only the second player in the history of Serie A to score a hat-trick after coming on as a substitute. The hat-trick was the fastest in Serie A since David Trezeguet scored a ten-minute hat-trick for Juventus in 2001.

On 3 January 2013, Milan was playing Italian Lega Pro 2 side Pro Patria in a mid-season friendly when Boateng and several other Milan players were the targets of racist chanting from a section of the Pro Patria crowd. Boateng reacted by kicking the ball into the stands before leaving the pitch, and was followed off by his teammates. The match was subsequently abandoned. His decision to walk off the pitch was later backed by various players and commentators.

On 20 February, Boateng scored the opening goal for Milan against Barcelona in the 2012–13 UEFA Champions League round of 16 first leg, which Milan went on to win 2–0. In August 2013, he was quoted as saying he had changed his style since signing for Milan, from playing primarily as a defensive midfielder to adopting the role of trequartista.

=== Schalke 04 ===
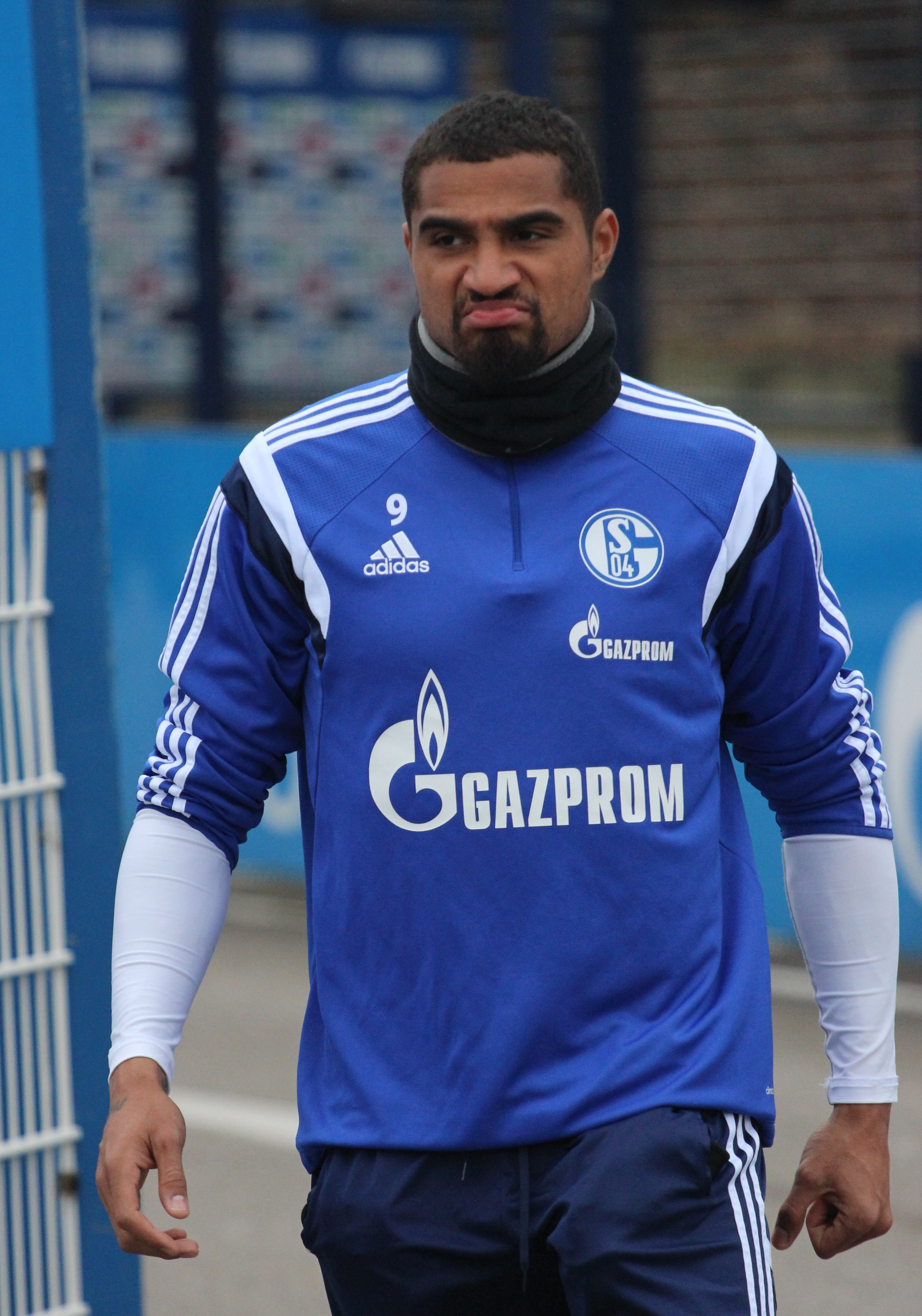
Boateng training with Schalke 04 in 2015

On 30 August 2013, Milan announced that Boateng had been transferred to German Bundesliga club Schalke 04 for a €10 million transfer fee on a four-year contract due to expire in June 2017.

Boateng made his debut for Schalke 04 in a 2–0 victory against Bayer Leverkusen. On 14 September 2013, he scored the winning goal for Schalke 04 in a 1–0 win over Mainz 05. On 30 October 2013, Boateng was voted the Schalke 04 player of the month for October 2013 by fans. On 9 November 2013, Boateng scored two goals against Werder Bremen; Schalke 04 won the match 3–1. Boateng scored seven Bundesliga goals over the season as Schalke finished in third place.

On 11 May 2015, Boateng, alongside Sidney Sam and Marco Höger, was suspended indefinitely from the club in the aftermath of a defeat against Köln as a result of poor behaviour which claimed to have led to the club's poor domestic performances.

His contract with Schalke was terminated on 8 December 2015.

=== Return to Milan ===
As Schalke 04 terminated his contract in December 2015, Boateng re-joined Milan on 5 January 2016, on a free transfer and signed a six-month contract. He was training with Milan since his suspension in September 2015. He made his official return debut on 9 January 2016, playing 36 minutes against Roma in a 1–1 draw and scored his first goal in his first match back at the San Siro six days later against Fiorentina in a 2–0 win.

On 25 May 2016, club owner Silvio Berlusconi announced Boateng's departure, along with those of Alex, Philippe Mexès, and Mario Balotelli.

=== Las Palmas ===
On 2 August 2016, Spanish La Liga club Las Palmas announced that they had reached an agreement with Boateng for his signature following his release from Milan. He made his debut on 22 August 2016, in a 4–2 away win against Valencia at the Mestalla Stadium. On 24 October Boateng scored a goal against Villarreal which was regarded by some pundits as one of the best goals of La Liga that year.

On 16 August 2017, Las Palmas announced that Boateng had cancelled his contract by the club by mutual consent, citing "irreversible personal reasons" for the decision.

=== Eintracht Frankfurt ===
On 18 August 2017, Boateng completed his move to Eintracht Frankfurt on a three-year deal, where he won the DFB-Pokal.

=== Sassuolo ===
On 5 July 2018, Boateng signed with Sassuolo on a three-year deal.

==== Barcelona (loan) ====
Boateng joined Spanish La Liga club Barcelona on 21 January 2019, on loan until the end of the 2018–19 season, with the club holding an option to sign him permanently for an €8 million transfer fee. He had joined the Catalan side to serve as a backup for Luis Suárez after Munir El Haddadi was sold to Sevilla. The transfer made him the first Ghanaian ever to represent the club. He made his club debut on 23 January, in a 2–0 away defeat to Sevilla in the first leg of the Copa del Rey quarter-finals.

=== Fiorentina ===
On 30 July 2019, Boateng signed with ACF Fiorentina. He made his debut for the club on 24 August in the opening game of the 2019–20 Serie A season, coming on as a substitute in the second half and scoring a goal in an eventual 4–3 home loss to Napoli.

==== Beşiktaş (loan) ====
On 31 January 2020, Boateng joined Turkish Süper Lig club Beşiktaş on loan for the remainder of the 2019–20 season.

=== Monza ===
On 28 September 2020, Boateng moved to newly promoted Serie B side Monza on a one-year contract, with the option to extend for a further year. He scored his first goal on 24 October 2020, converting a penalty in a 1–2 defeat to Chievo at home. On 15 December 2020, Boateng scored two headed goals in a league game against Virtus Entella, helping Monza win 5–0.

=== Hertha BSC return and retirement ===
On 23 June 2021, Boateng returned to Hertha BSC.

On 11 August 2023, he announced his retirement from playing.

== International career ==
=== Youth ===
==== Germany ====
Boateng holds a German passport, previously playing for the Germany national youth team. His long-distance goal for the under-19 team in a 2005 UEFA European Under-19 Football Championship match against Greece – which Germany won 3–0 – was voted Goal of the Month by viewers of a German Das Erste TV sports show.

In 2007, Berliner Morgenpost reported that then Germany under-21 coach Dieter Eilts would no longer select him and other team players due to a curfew that had been broken in the team's camp during the June 2007 Toulon Tournament in France. In February 2009, Boateng was called up to the Germany U21 team by new coach Horst Hrubesch for the international match against the Republic of Ireland in Cork. Hrubesch selected Boateng in the preliminary U21 squad for the 2009 UEFA European Under-21 Football Championship in Sweden in June 2009.

In June 2009, Boateng told the German authorities that he was no longer interested in representing Germany.

=== Senior ===
==== Switch to Ghana ====
Boateng received a Ghanaian passport and switched his allegiance to Ghana in May 2010; he has said that he feels more Ghanaian. He began his senior international football career by attending training with the national side, "The Black Stars," that same month at the Accra Sports Stadium in Greater Accra prior the 2010 World Cup. Boateng made his debut in a 1–0 victory over Latvia in June 2010.

==== 2006 World Cup ====
In 2006, the Ghana Football Association had been in contact with Boateng on him representing Ghana ahead of the 2006 World Cup. But the process under which FIFA had to decide on his eligibility would be long, as Boateng was past the age under the old FIFA rules where old youth internationals could switch allegiance. FIFA's decision to reverse the rules in 2009 had given Boateng the green light to switch his allegiance, and time appeared to be running out when his clearance to represent the Black Stars had still not arrived at the beginning of May 2010.

==== 2010 World Cup ====
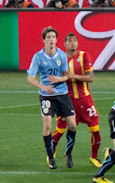
Boateng (right) playing for Ghana at the 2010 FIFA World Cup

Boateng was selected as part of the Ghana squad for the 2010 World Cup in South Africa by head coach Milovan Rajevac, to fill in for the injured Michael Essien alongside defensive midfielder Anthony Annan. On 23 June, he was selected to start in Ghana's game against Germany, whose team included his brother Jérôme Boateng. Ghana held Germany to a 60th-minute lone goal and 1–0 win. It was the first time that two brothers played on opposite teams at the World Cup. Boateng picked up the ball from the half-way line, dribbled it "rapidly bamboozling" his opponents before scoring with a left-footed shot from outside the penalty area in the fourth minute of a 2–1 win over the United States in the round-of-16 in Rustenburg's Royal Bafokeng Sports Palace on 26 June.

==== First retirement ====
In November 2011, Boateng announced his international retirement, citing fatigue from travel at the age of 24 years, thus missing the chance to contest the 2012 Africa Cup of Nations. In September 2012, Marseille's Ghanaian striker and close friend André Ayew revealed that Boateng was considering reversing his decision to retire, but he did not play in the 2013 Africa Cup of Nations either.

==== 2014 World Cup ====
On 1 October 2013, Boateng was selected for Ghana's 2014 FIFA World Cup qualification play-offs against Egypt. On 19 November 2013, he came on as a 79th-minute substitute in the second leg and scored Ghana's only goal in the 89th minute as the Black Stars secured qualification for the 2014 World Cup in Brazil.

On 2 June 2014, Boateng was named in Ghana's squad for the World Cup finals. In the team's opening match, he came on as a second-half substitute against the United States in a 2–1 defeat. He was then selected to start against Germany in a 2–2 draw, playing against his brother again.

On 26 June, Boateng was sent home and suspended from the Ghana squad for disciplinary reasons, only hours before the final group match against Portugal, after he was alleged to have verbally abused former manager James Kwesi Appiah during a team meeting. Boateng was sent home along with midfielder Sulley Muntari. On 29 June, Boateng had hit back at the Ghana Football Association, describing the Black Stars' organisation during the tournament as "amateurish".

== Style of play ==
Boateng is a quick, dynamic, physically strong and well-rounded midfielder, known for his aggression, eye for goal, long-range shooting ability, flair, footspeed, ball-juggling tricks, and dribbling skills. A versatile and tenacious player, his game has a particular dependence on "sheer strength, power and energy." He can produce the work rate, ball retrieval and attacking willingness of the box-to-box midfielder. He combines technical skill with speed of action which makes him more dangerous. A 2014 profile on FIFA's official website described Boateng as being "blessed with strength, speed, killer instinct in front of goal, and an uncommon flamboyance in the attacking third."

Boateng has been used in many midfield positions throughout his career, but usually plays either in the centre in a box-to-box role, or as an attacking midfielder or forward; he has also been deployed as a false-attacking midfielder, as a second striker, or even as a winger on occasion during his time with Milan. With Las Palmas and Sassuolo, he was also deployed in a more advanced, central attacking role, essentially positioned as a lone striker, but effectively functioning as a false-9, due to his ability to drop deep, link-up with midfielders, and create space for his other attacking teammates with his movement off the ball. In addition to his playing ability, Boateng is known for his acrobatic goal celebrations, and often celebrates scoring goals with a backflip. His former Hertha BSC teammate Niko Kovač has also praised Boateng for his leadership, stating: "Kevin gives the team a sense of stability, both mentally and physically," also describing him as a "warrior."

== Other activities ==
=== Anti-racism ===
In February 2013, Boateng was appointed as the first global ambassador for the FIFA anti-discrimination taskforce, to work alongside FIFA Vice-president Jeffrey Webb at FIFA headquarters. In March, Boateng presented FIFA President Sepp Blatter with his first phase of solutions to ending global racism in football, as requested by Blatter. In March 2013, Boateng was named as the United Nations (UN) ambassador for anti-racism. He delivered his first speech in that role accompanied by UN human rights chief Navi Pillay at the United Nations Office at Geneva. In 2020, Boateng produced special Black Lives Matter boots with Puma.

=== Music ===
Boateng is a keen singer and dancer, and has said that his singing and dancing idol is Michael Jackson. He enjoys choreography, and singing. Boateng performed a dance routine involving Jackson's trademarked Moonwalk for a packed-out San Siro of 88,000 spectators upon Milan celebrating their 18th Scudetto, and sang an a cappella live on beIN Sports television to celebrate their eighth birthday.

In August 2018, he released a rap song under the alias PRIN$$ Boateng named King on the World Star Hip Hop channel. Boateng released his second single, Bella Vita, in July 2019.

== Personal life ==
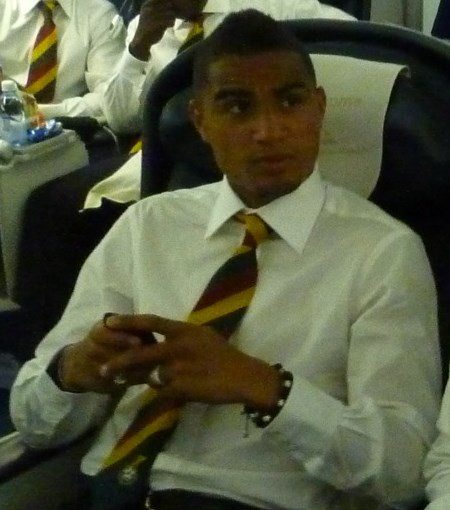
Boateng pictured in 2013

Boateng and his brother Jérôme are the only brothers to face each other in a World Cup match, which they did in 2010 and 2014. Boateng has criticized his brother and stated the two are estranged.

Boateng is divorced from his first wife Jenny. He became engaged to Italian model Melissa Satta in 2011, and the pair have a child. The couple were wed in June 2016 in Porto Cervo, Sardinia. Their marriage ended in December 2020. Boateng has been living in Australia since retirement, after meeting his fourth wife, Marsi, there.

He became a devout Christian in retirement, stating his faith helped him recover from trauma and addiction.

Boateng speaks Turkish, German, English, and Italian, and understands French and Arabic.

He has a tattoo of the map of Ghana and the country's name on his arm. Across his ribs, he has the Chinese words for clan, health, love, success and trust, and he has other tattoos on his upper body.

== Career statistics ==
=== Club ===
Appearances and goals by club, season and competition
Club	Season	League			National cup (Note: Includes DFB-Pokal, FA Cup, Coppa Italia, Copa del Rey, Turkish Cup)		League cup (Note: Includes Football League Cup)		Europe		Other		Total	
Club	Season	Division	Apps	Goals	Apps	Goals	Apps	Goals	Apps	Goals	Apps	Goals	Apps	Goals
Hertha BSC II	2004–05	Regionalliga Nord	18	3	—		—		—		—		18	3
Hertha BSC II	2005–06	Regionalliga Nord	4	1	—		—		—		—		4	1
Hertha BSC II	2006–07	Regionalliga Nord	7	1	—		—		—		—		7	1
Hertha BSC II	Total		29	5	0	0	0	0	0	0	0	0	29	5
Hertha BSC	2005–06	Bundesliga	21	2	2	0	—		4 (Note: Appearances in UEFA Cup)	0	—		27	2
Hertha BSC	2006–07	Bundesliga	21	2	3	0	—		2	1	—		26	3
Hertha BSC	Total		42	4	5	0	0	0	6	1	0	0	53	5
Tottenham Hotspur	2007–08	Premier League	13	0	5	0	0	0	3	0	—		21	0
Tottenham Hotspur	2008–09	Premier League	1	0	2	0	0	0	0	0	—		3	0
Tottenham Hotspur	2009–10	Premier League	0	0	—		1	0	—		—		1	0
Tottenham Hotspur	Total		14	0	7	0	1	0	3	0	0	0	25	0
Borussia Dortmund (loan)	2008–09	Bundesliga	10	0	1	0	—		—		—		11	0
Portsmouth	2009–10	Premier League	22	3	5	2	—		—		—		27	5
Milan	2010–11	Serie A	26	3	1	0	—		7 (Note: Appearances in UEFA Champions League)	0	—		34	3
Milan	2011–12	Serie A	19	5	0	0	—		7	3	1 (Note: Appearance in Supercoppa Italiana)	1	27	9
Milan	2012–13	Serie A	29	2	1	0	—		7	1	—		37	3
Milan	2013–14	Serie A	0	0	0	0	—		2	2	—		2	2
Milan	Total		74	10	2	0	0	0	23	6	1	1	100	17
Schalke 04	2013–14	Bundesliga	28	6	1	0	—		6	1	—		35	7
Schalke 04	2014–15	Bundesliga	18	0	1	0	—		6	0	—		25	0
Schalke 04	Total		46	6	2	0	0	0	12	1	0	0	60	7
Milan	2015–16	Serie A	11	1	3	0	—		—		—		14	1
Las Palmas	2016–17	La Liga	28	10	1	0	—		—		—		29	10
Eintracht Frankfurt	2017–18	Bundesliga	31	6	5	0	—		—		—		36	6
Sassuolo	2018–19	Serie A	13	4	2	1	—		—		—		15	5
Barcelona (loan)	2018–19	La Liga	3	0	1	0	—		0	0	0	0	4	0
Fiorentina	2019–20	Serie A	14	1	1	0	—		—		—		15	1
Beşiktaş (loan)	2019–20	Süper Lig	11	3	—		—		—		—		11	3
Monza	2020–21	Serie B	24	5	0	0	—		—		1 (Note: Appearance in Serie B promotion play-offs)	0	25	5
Hertha BSC	2021–22	Bundesliga	18	0	2	0	—		—		1 (Note: Appearance in Bundesliga relegation play-offs)	0	21	0
Hertha BSC	2022–23	Bundesliga	16	0	1	0	—		—		—		17	0
Hertha BSC	Total		34	0	3	0	0	0	0	0	1	0	38	0
Career total			406	58	38	3	1	0	44	8	3	1	492	70

=== International ===
Appearances and goals by national team and year
National team	Year	Apps	Goals
Ghana	2010	8	1
Ghana	2011	1	0
Ghana	2012	0	0
Ghana	2013	1	1
Ghana	2014	5	0
Total		15	2

Ghana score listed first, score column indicates score after each Boateng goal.

List of international goals scored by Kevin-Prince Boateng
No.	Date	Venue	Opponent	Score	Result	Competition
1	26 June 2010	Royal Bafokeng Stadium, Rustenburg, South Africa	United States	1–0	2–1	2010 FIFA World Cup
2	19 November 2013	30 June Stadium, Cairo, Egypt	Egypt	1–2	1–2	2014 FIFA World Cup qualification

== Honours ==
Portsmouth

- FA Cup runner-up: 2009–10

AC Milan

- Serie A: 2010–11
- Supercoppa Italiana: 2011
- Coppa Italia runner-up: 2015–16

Eintracht Frankfurt

- DFB-Pokal: 2017–18

Barcelona

- La Liga: 2018–19

Individual

- Fritz Walter Medal U18 bronze: 2005
- Fritz Walter Medal U19 gold: 2006
- Das Erste Goal of the Month: 2005
- Serie A Team of the Year: 2010–11
- CAF Team of the Year: 2010, 2011
