= Jérôme Boateng =

German footballer (born 1988)

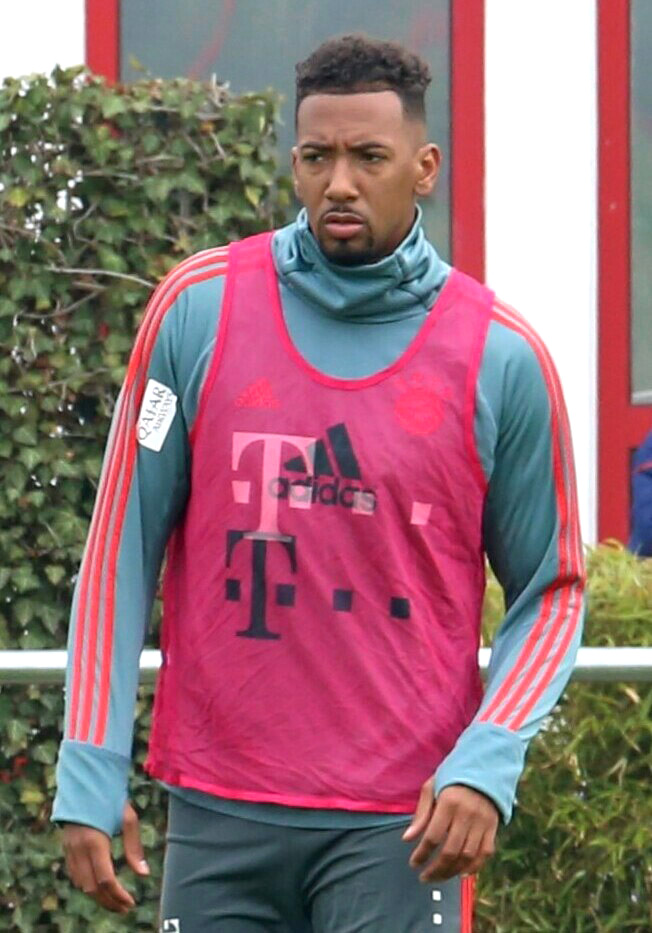
- Boateng training with Bayern Munich in 2019

Personal information
- Full name: Jérôme Agyenim Boateng
- Date of birth: 3 September 1988 (age 38)
- Place of birth: West Berlin, West Germany
- Height: 1.92 m (6 ft 4 in)
- Position: Centre-back

Youth career
- 1994–2002: Tennis Borussia Berlin
- 2002–2006: Hertha BSC

Senior career*
Years	Team	Apps	(Gls)
2006–2007	Hertha BSC II	24	(1)
2007	Hertha BSC	10	(0)
2007–2010	Hamburger SV	75	(0)
2010–2011	Manchester City	16	(0)
2011–2021	Bayern Munich	229	(5)
2021–2023	Lyon	32	(0)
2024	Salernitana	7	(0)
2024–2025	LASK	10	(0)
Total		403	(6)

International career
2004–2005	Germany U17	4	(1)
2005–2007	Germany U19	17	(2)
2007–2009	Germany U21	15	(1)
2009–2018	Germany	76	(1)
Medal record
Men's football
Representing Germany
FIFA World Cup
Winner	2014 Brazil
Third place	2010 South Africa
UEFA European Championship
Bronze medal – third place	2012 Poland–Ukraine
UEFA European Under-21 Championship
Winner	2009 Sweden
- * Club domestic league appearances and goals

Jérôme Agyenim Boateng (German pronunciation: [ʒeˈʁoːm bo.aˈtɛŋ]; born 3 September 1988) is a German former professional footballer who played as a centre-back.

Boateng started his career at Hertha BSC where he developed from the youth ranks to the first team. After his debut season at Hertha, he soon signed for Hamburger SV and established himself as an integral part of the team, helping the club reach two consecutive UEFA Europa League semi-finals.

After a season playing for Manchester City, he joined Bayern Munich in 2011 and won many domestic and European honours with the club, most notably the continental treble in the 2012–13 and 2019–20 seasons. His contract ran out on 30 June 2021 and he subsequently became a free agent before opting to sign for Lyon. Afterwards, he joined Italian side Salernitana.

Boateng played in the Germany U21 side which won the 2009 Euro U-21 Championship and was soon promoted to the national side. Boateng has since accumulated over 70 caps and represented Germany at UEFA Euro 2012, Euro 2016, 2010 World Cup, 2014 World Cup, and 2018 World Cup. He was a key member of his country's victory in the 2014 World Cup.

== Early life ==
Jérôme Agyenim Boateng was born on 3 September 1988in West Berlin, West Germany. He is a Ghanaian German, born to a German mother named Martina and a Ghanaian father.

He is the younger half-brother of fellow footballer Kevin-Prince Boateng. He also another elder half-brother, George, who played for the youth sides at Hertha BSC but not professionally.

== Club career ==
=== Early career ===
Boateng started his career with the youth team of Tennis Borussia Berlin, before joining Hertha BSC in 2002.

=== Hertha BSC ===
After emerging from the youth team set-up, he played for the reserves for two seasons. He scored one goal in nine appearances in the 2005–06 season and made 15 appearances in the 2006–07 season. He won a call-up to the first-team squad on 31 January 2007. He made his debut against Hannover 96 in the AWD-Arena, during week 19 of the 2006–07 Bundesliga season. He then became a first-team regular, despite being barely 18 years of age. He finished the 2006–07 season with 11 appearances for the first team.

Boateng was linked with a move to Hamburger SV in the summer of 2007. Because of this, according to the German media, Boateng did not want to sign a five-year professional contract with Hertha.

=== Hamburger SV ===
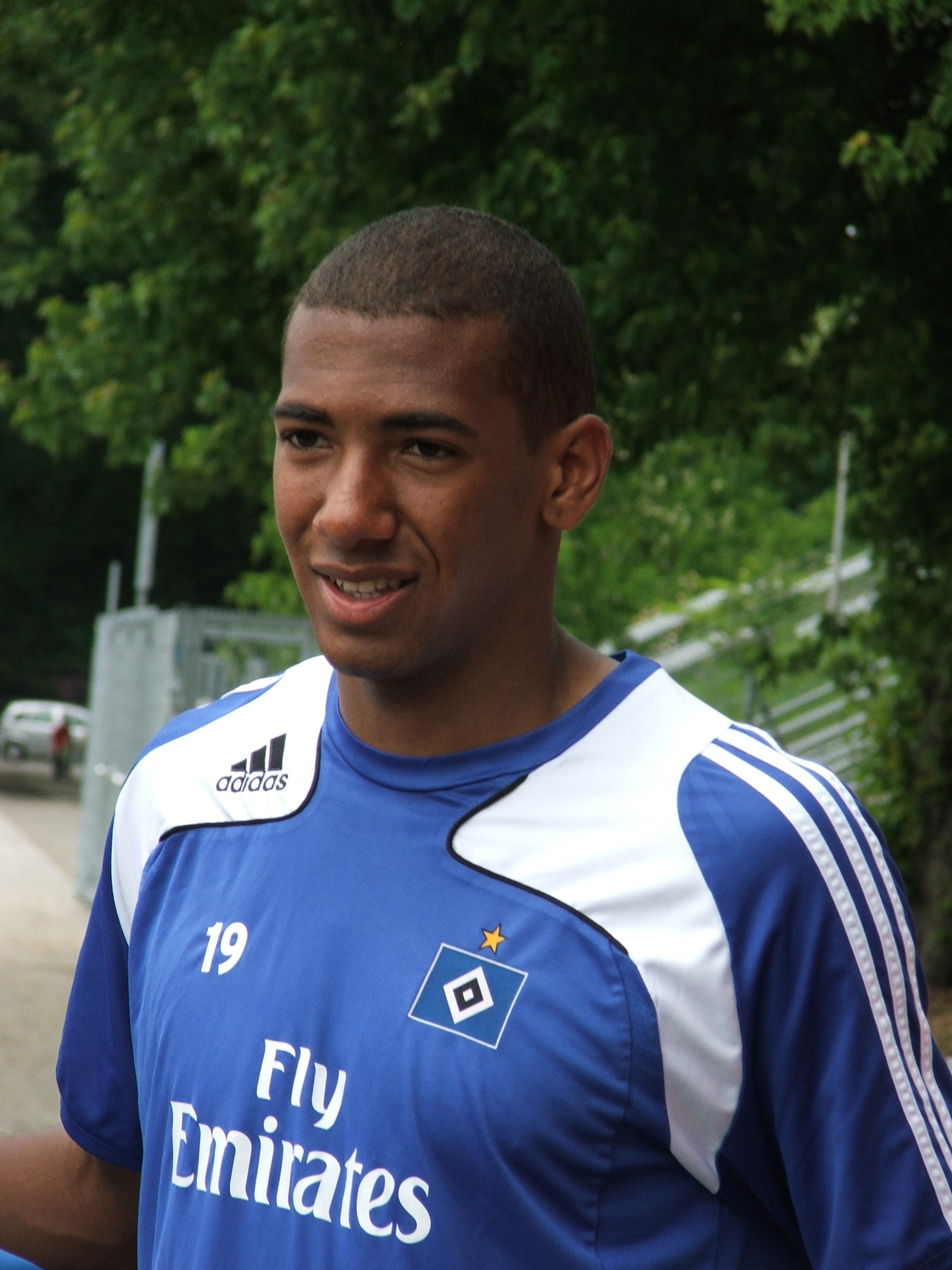
Boateng with Hamburger SV in 2009

Boateng moved to Hamburg on 22 August 2007 for a fee said to be around €1.1 million. Boateng spent two successful years at Hamburg, where he would go on to become an important part of the side's defence in the 2008–09 season which saw Hamburg in the race for the Bundesliga title, as well as reaching the semi-finals of the UEFA Europa League in both his years at the club. He had made 37 appearances during the 2007–08 season. and 35 appearances during the 2008–09 season. In the 2009–10 season, he broke into the Germany national side after impressing for Hamburg, earning himself a place in the squad for the 2010 FIFA World Cup. He finished the 2009–10 season with a goal in 41 appearances.

=== Manchester City ===
On 5 June 2010, Premier League club Manchester City confirmed the transfer of Boateng to the English club for £10.4 million on a five-year deal, where he wore his favoured number 17 shirt. He made his City debut in a pre-season friendly against Valencia for the first half, alternating between centre-back and right-back with Micah Richards. After an impressive run, down the right flank, he provided the assisting cross for Gareth Barry to score.

During the week prior to the start of the 2010–11 Premier League season, Boateng suffered an injury setback on international duty with Germany during a friendly against Denmark. He tore a tendon in his left knee, which was then aggravated on the plane home after a collision with a drinks trolley.

He made his debut for Manchester City with a substitute appearance during a 1–0 victory against Chelsea on 25 September 2010. He followed this with a first competitive start in a 1–1 Europa League draw with Juventus, playing at right-back. In his one season with City, Boateng made 24 appearances. He also won the 2010–11 FA Cup despite not being a member of the matchday squad for the final.

=== Bayern Munich ===
==== 2011–12 season ====
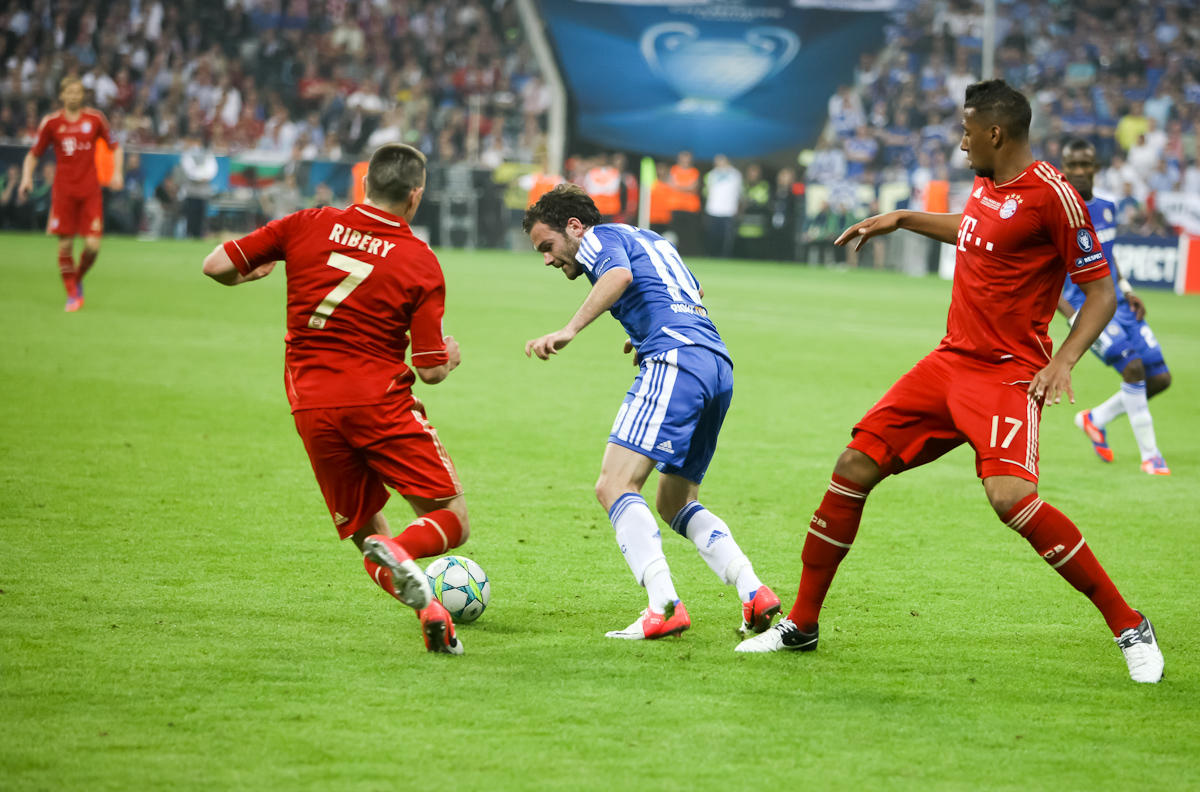
Boateng (right) playing for Bayern in the 2012 UEFA Champions League Final

In June 2011, Boateng expressed his desire to leave Manchester City for Bayern Munich, stating that playing for Bayern would help his chances of playing regularly for the Germany national team and that he was frustrated at having to play almost exclusively at right-back.

On 14 July 2011, Bayern confirmed the transfer of Boateng to the German club for a fee of €13.5 million on a four-year deal. He was given the same number 17 shirt he wore at Manchester City and for most of his time with Hamburg. He made his debut on 27 July 2011 as a second-half substitute for Rafinha during the 2011 Audi Cup in a match against Milan. His Bundesliga debut for Bayern came in a 0–1 home defeat against Borussia Mönchengladbach, on 6 August; an error between himself and fellow new signing goalkeeper Manuel Neuer allowed Igor de Camargo to score the only goal. The team finished the season as runners-up in the Bundesliga, DFB-Pokal and Champions League, with Boateng playing the finals of the latter two tournaments in their entirety. He made 48 appearances during the 2011–12 season.

==== 2012–13 season ====
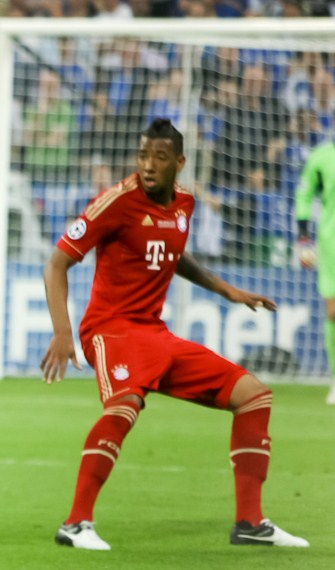
Boateng playing for Bayern Munich in 2012

During the 2012–13 season, Boateng was a regular member of the Bayern team that won a treble of the Bundesliga, DFB-Pokal and Champions League, in addition to the DFL-Supercup at the start of the season. On 5 December 2012, Boateng picked up a red card against BATE Borisov which resulted in a two-match ban. He scored his first Bundesliga goal with a header from Phillip Lahm's cross on 9 March 2013, the winner as Bayern came from behind for a 3–2 home win against Fortuna Düsseldorf. He netted a second on 13 April, an acrobatic half-volley to open a 5–0 home win over 1. FC Nürnberg, after Bayern had already won the league title. He scored two goals in 40 appearances during the 2012–13 season.

==== 2013–14 season ====
On 2 October 2013, Boateng picked up a red card against former club Manchester City which resulted in a one-match ban in the Champions League. His only league goal of the season was on 9 November, finishing a corner after four minutes of a 3–0 home win over FC Augsburg. He extended his contract with Bayern on 11 December, which will keep him at the club until 2018. On 3 May 2014, Boateng picked up a red card which resulted in a two-match ban. Bayern ended the season as winners of a domestic double of the Bundesliga and DFB-Pokal. He scored a goal in 43 appearances during the 2013–14 season.

==== 2014–15 season ====
On 17 September 2014, Boateng scored his first European goal for Bayern in the 2014–15 Champions League season with a strike which was the only goal in the opening group stage match against his former club Manchester City. Boateng picked up a red card against Schalke 04 on 3 February 2015 which resulted in a three-match ban in the Bundesliga.

Boateng scored in a 7–0 Champions League round of 16 win against Shakhtar Donetsk on 11 March 2015, and in a 6–1 quarter-final win over Porto on 21 April. He finished the 2014–15 season three goals in 44 appearances.

==== 2015–16 season ====
Boateng started the 2015–16 season by playing in the German Super Cup. He picked up a red card against 1899 Hoffenheim on 22 August 2015. On 18 December, Boateng signed a new contract with Bayern, keeping him at the club until 2021. He finished the 2015–16 season with 31 appearances.

==== 2016–17 season ====
On 20 December 2016, Boateng suffered pectoral muscle tendon and was out for almost three months. On 11 March 2017, Boateng made his return after 108 days as a substitute by replacing Javi Martínez in the 64th minute in a 3–0 victory over Eintracht Frankfurt. On 14 April 2017, head coach Carlo Ancelotti confirmed that Boateng was ruled out of the away match in the league against Bayer Leverkusen due to adductor problem. He made his return on 20 May 2017, Boateng sustained muscle injury and was subbed off just after 11 minutes in the last match of the season where Bayern won 4–1 against SC Freiburg. He finished the 2016–17 season with 21 appearances.

==== 2017–18 season ====
On 13 September 2017, Boateng made his comeback after 115 days on the sidelines in the Champions League match and provided one assist to Joshua Kimmich's late goal after being subbed on in a 3–0 victory over Anderlecht. On 21 December, Boateng scored a header in a 2–1 win as his side knocked their fierce rival Borussia Dortmund out of the DFB-Pokal during the round of 16 match. On 27 January 2018, Boateng scored another header in the league match and his first league goal since November 2013 as his side made a comeback from two goal behind to finish the game with a 5–2 victory over 1899 Hoffenheim. Boateng made his 250th appearance for the club in a 6–0 victory over Hamburg on 10 March. On 11 April, Boateng and his teammate Thomas Müller made their 100th European appearance in the Champions League match against Sevilla as the game finished 0–0 draw. On 26 April, Boateng suffered thigh muscle injury during the Champions League semi-final first leg match against Real Madrid in which the game ended 2–1 loss for his sides and the injury made him miss all the remaining matches of the season. He finished the 2017–18 season with two goals in 31 appearances.

==== 2018–19 season ====
Boateng entered the season injury-free and started the season strong as he played every minute of Bayern's first three Bundesliga matches. During the first half of the season, Boateng was rotated along with Bayern's other two centre-backs, Mats Hummels and Niklas Süle. Boateng lost his place in the starting lineup as Bayern's coach, Niko Kovač, decided that Hummels and Süle were his first option. After the winter break, Boateng was linked to other clubs as he was reported to be unhappy with his position at Bayern.

On 18 May 2019, Boateng won his seventh consecutive Bundesliga title as Bayern finished two points above Dortmund with 78 points. A week later, Boateng won his fourth DFB-Pokal as Bayern defeated RB Leipzig 3–0 in the 2019 DFB-Pokal Final. Boateng did not appear in the match as he was an unused substitute. He finished the 2018–19 season without scoring in 28 appearances.

==== 2019–20 season ====
On 14 December 2019, Boateng made his 300th appearance for Bayern in a match against Werder Bremen.

Boateng also regained his place in the starting XI, often partnering up with David Alaba, after Niklas Süle suffered a long-term injury in October 2019 and Bayern's new signing Lucas Hernandez suffered from minor injuries. He regained his form in this season and performed very well, completing his second continental treble.

==== 2020–21 season ====
On 3 November 2020, Boateng scored his first goal of the season in a 6–2 away win over Red Bull Salzburg in the Champions League.

In April 2021, Bayern's sporting director Hasan Salihamidžić stated that Boateng's contract would expire in the summer and would not be extended.

=== Lyon ===
On 1 September 2021, Boateng joined Ligue 1 club Lyon on a free transfer. He signed a contract until 30 June 2023. On 9 June 2023, Lyon confirmed via social media that Boateng would leave the club upon the expiry of his contract.

=== Salernitana ===
On 2 February 2024, Boateng signed with Salernitana in Italy until the end of the 2023–24 season. He became a free agent upon the season's conclusion following the club's relegation.

=== LASK ===
On 31 May 2024, Boateng joined Austrian side LASK by signing a contract until 2026. On 19 August 2025, Boateng's contract was terminated by mutual consent.

=== Retirement ===
On 19 September 2025, Boateng announced his retirement from professional football. Boateng pursued coaching training at Bayern Munich and Barcelona in 2025, but both clubs severed ties due to backlash surrounding Boateng’s legal proceedings.

== International career ==
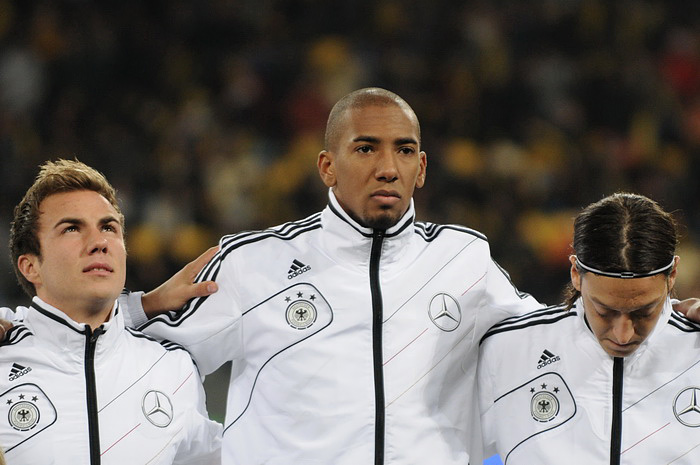
Boateng lining up for Germany with Mario Götze (left) and Mesut Özil (right) prior to a match in 2011

Boateng has played for the German under-17 and under-19 national teams. On 5 July 2007 he was called up to the German under-19 squad by coach Frank Engel for the 2007 UEFA European Under-19 Championship held in Austria, from 16 July until 27 July.

Boateng is also a former Germany under-21 international and won with the team the 2009 UEFA European Under-21 Championship. He made his debut with the Germany senior team on 10 October 2009 against Russia, becoming the first German international to get sent off on his debut; he received a second booking in the second half. Despite this shaky start, he was called up regularly ever since.

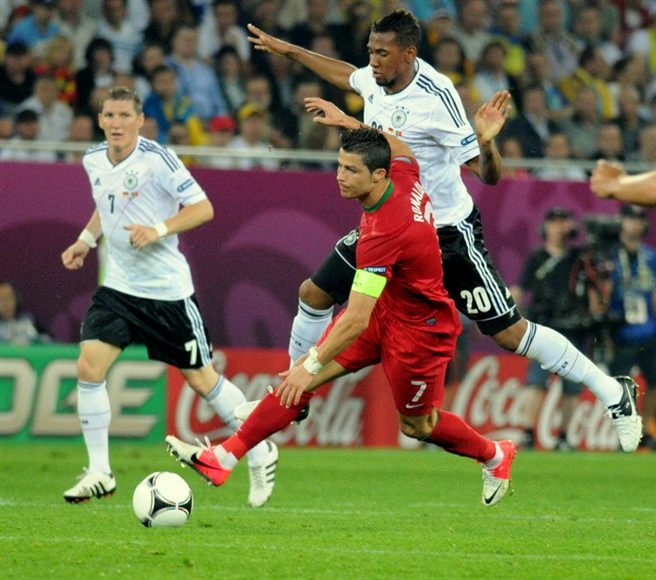
Boateng challenging Cristiano Ronaldo of Portugal during a UEFA Euro 2012 group stage match

=== 2010 FIFA World Cup ===
Boateng was included in Joachim Löw's final 23-man squad for the 2010 World Cup in South Africa.

On 23 June 2010, Boateng played for Germany against his half-brother; Kevin-Prince who represents Ghana. The game ended in a 1–0 victory for Germany. It was the first time that two brothers played on opposite teams at the FIFA World Cup.

Boateng started his second straight game as Germany beat England 4–1, and Argentina 4–0 in the quarter-final, as well as the 1–0 loss to Spain in the semi-final.

Boateng featured in the third-place game against Uruguay. He aided Germany to a 3–2 win by providing the assist for Germany's second goal by Marcell Jansen, helping to secure third place at a second straight World Cup.

=== UEFA Euro 2012 ===
Boateng was included in Germany's 23-man squad for Euro 2012. He played at right-back and featured in four of their five matches as the nation reached the semi-final, but were eliminated by Italy.

=== 2014 FIFA World Cup ===
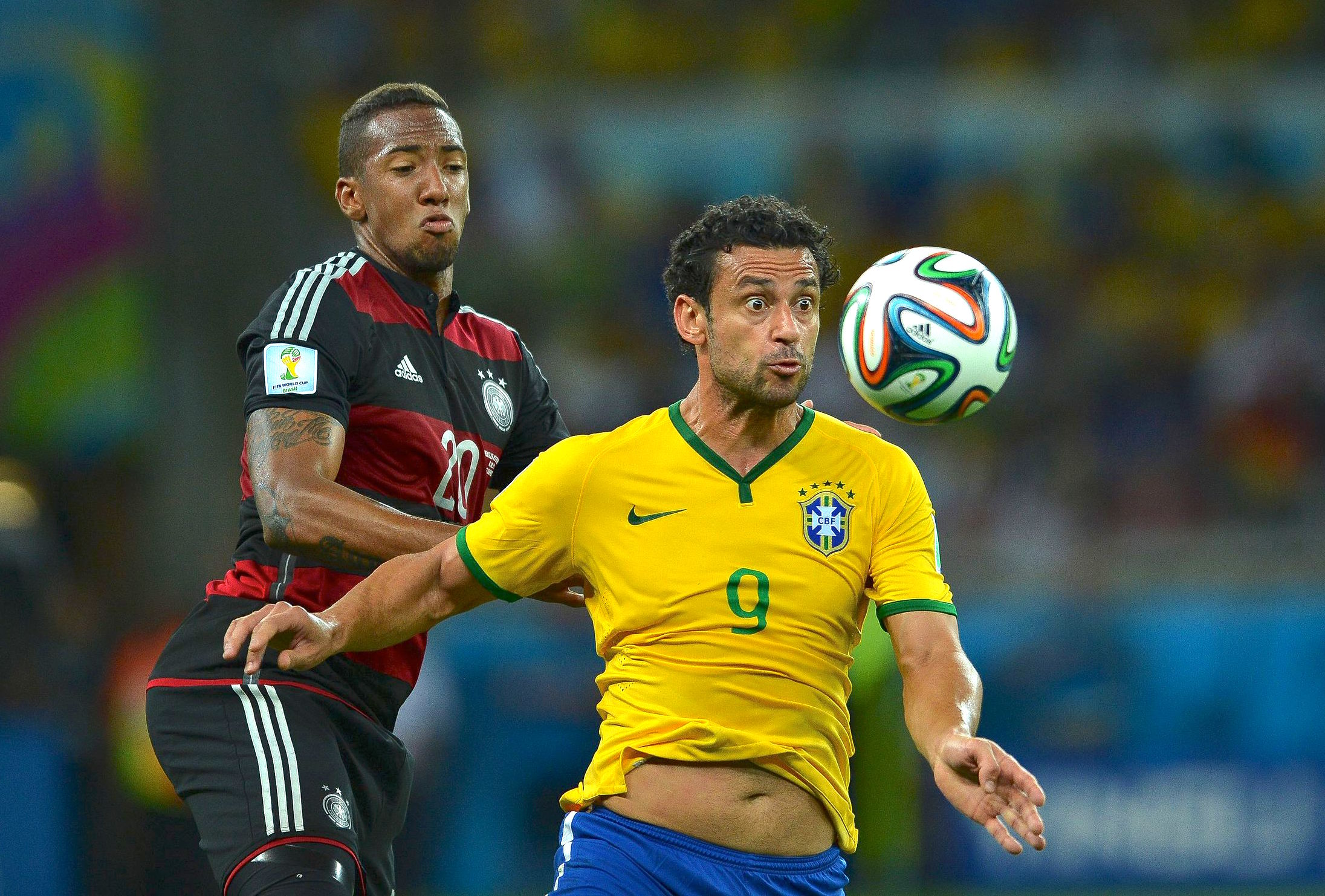
Fred and Boateng battling for the ball in the 2014 World Cup semi-final between Brazil and Germany

Boateng and his brother played against each other again four years later during the next World Cup, when Ghana and Germany were once again drawn in the same group. On 8 July 2014, Boateng played the full match for Germany in their record-breaking 7–1 semi-final defeat of Brazil.

On 13 July 2014, Boateng won the 2014 World Cup with Germany after they defeated Argentina 1–0 in the final. He played a central role in Germany's victory in the final, winning 83% of his duels and making several good tackles alongside teammate Mats Hummels, while only committing 1 foul throughout the entire 120 minutes. Several media sources named him as man of the match, although the official man of the match was Mario Götze.

=== UEFA Euro 2016 ===
On 13 June 2016, Boateng made a vital goal-line clearance which denied Ukraine to score a goal as the match ended in a 2–0 victory for the Germans in their first group stage match. On 26 June, Boateng scored his first international goal in the round of 16 match against Slovakia, opening the scoring with a long-range volley in the 3–0 victory. On 8 July, Boateng was subbed off in the second half as he suffered thigh muscle injury during the semi-final match against France and the match ended 2–0 loss for Germany.

During this time, Boateng was a part of a collaboration between the German Football Association and The LEGO Group, who in May 2016 released a Europe-exclusive collectible minifigure series, with Boateng featured as the third of sixteen minifigures in the collection.

=== 2018 FIFA World Cup ===
Boateng was named in Joachim Löw's final 23-man squad for the 2018 FIFA World Cup on 4 June 2018. On 23 June, Boateng was sent off after receiving a second yellow card during their second group stage match against Sweden, which Germany won 2–1. He also became the first German player to be sent off in a World Cup match since Miroslav Klose against Serbia in the 2010 World Cup. As a result, he missed Germany's 0–2 shock defeat to South Korea which eliminated them from the tournament.

On 5 March 2019, national team coach Joachim Löw confirmed that he would plan without Boateng for the foreseeable future, along with his club teammates Mats Hummels and Thomas Müller.

== Style of play ==
A versatile defender, Boateng primarily is a centre-back, although he can also play as a right-back. Physically strong and composed in possession, he has gained a reputation as a tough-tackling defender, with good passing and an ability to read the game. Despite his talent in his youth, he was initially accused by certain pundits of being error-prone defensively; however, he later came to be considered one of the world's best players in his position.

== Personal life ==
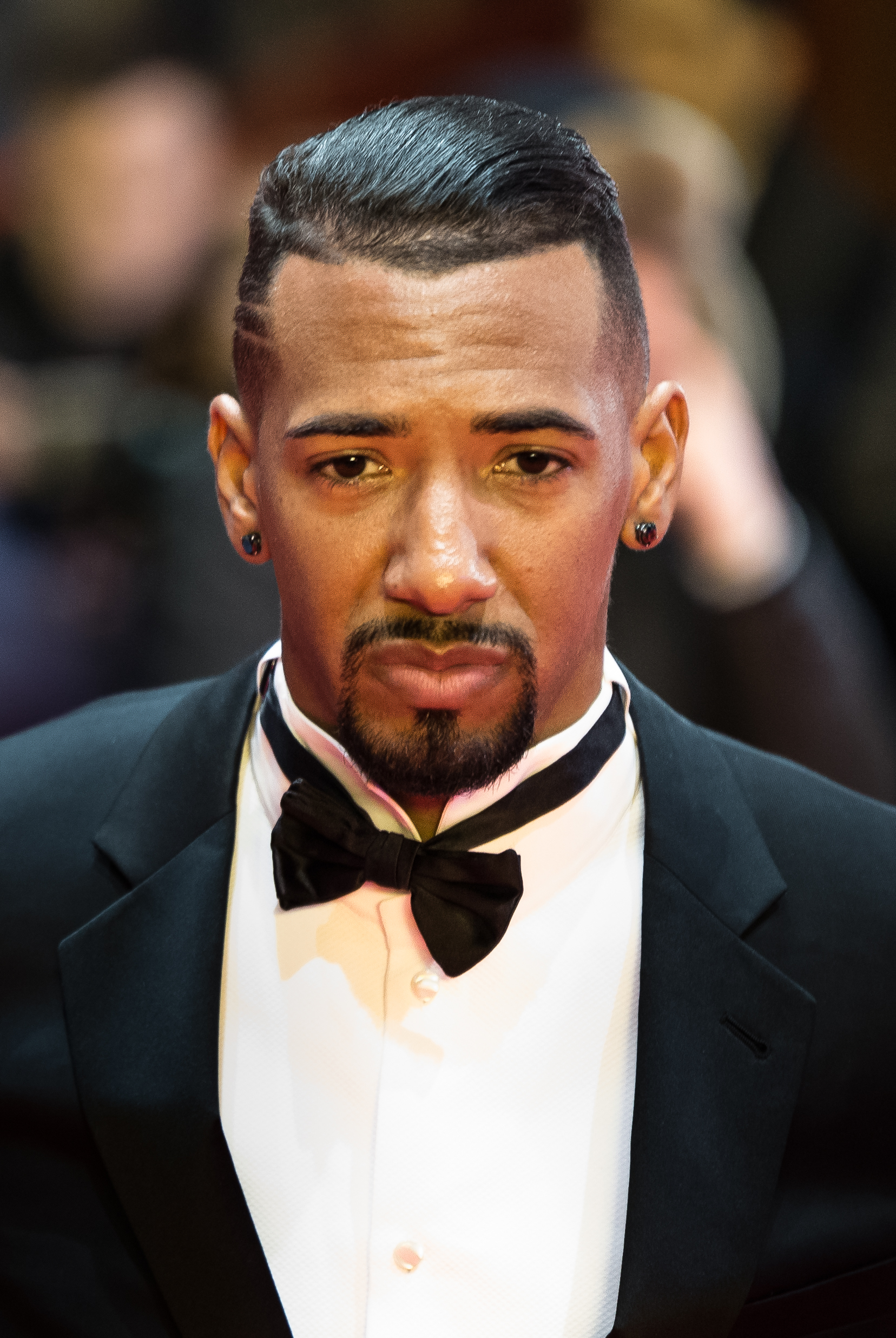
Boateng in 2017

Boateng is the younger, paternal half-brother of fellow professional footballer Kevin-Prince Boateng. They are the only brothers to face each other in a World Cup match, which they did in 2010 and 2014. Kevin-Prince has criticized his brother and stated the two are estranged.

Boateng was in a long-term, on-off relationship with Sherin Senler. Together they have twin daughters, and Boateng also has a younger son. Boateng was found guilty of causing bodily harm to Senler, assaulting her on vacation in 2018.

In 2019, Boateng began a relationship with Polish-born model Kasia Lenhardt. In February 2021, following a public spat after Lenhardt crashed Boateng's car and was charged with driving under the influence, Boateng announced the two were separating. The relationship had already publicly soured, with Boateng accusing Lenhardt of sabotaging a previous relationship. He accused Lendhardt and Senler of making false claims of violence. On 10 February, one week after the confirmed breakup, Lenhardt, a 25-year-old mother, was found dead in a Berlin apartment. Investigators believed the cause to be suicide. Boateng, who was in Qatar playing in the FIFA Club World Cup with Bayern Munich at the time, was confirmed by the club to have departed the country for personal reasons.

Der Spiegel conducted an investigation into Boateng and, in March 2024, reported on a 2021 email from Boateng's mother that was used in custody proceedings between Boateng and Senler. Boateng's mother wrote (originally in German): "For years, my son has been abusing women psychologically and physically, now Kasia Lenhardt has taken her own life and he still doesn't want to suffer the consequences for his behavior." Der Spiegel also reported the contents of Lenhardt's iPhone, given to the publication by her relatives. The contents included claims from Lenhardt that Boateng almost broke her thumb, threw glasses, and caused hematomas on her arms, which she had photographed. Der Spiegel reported that several people heard the same story from Lenhardt. In January 2021, Lenhardt wrote to Boateng claiming that he tore her ear and hurt her knee, while he denied doing so.

=== Assault charge ===
On 9 September 2021, a German court found Boateng guilty of assaulting his ex-girlfriend, Sherin Senler, on holiday in the Caribbean in 2018. He was sentenced to 60 days, or a daily fine in lieu of jail time, calculated based on income. The Munich District Court imposed the highest possible financial damages for a domestic violence conviction on Boateng, who denied the allegations. Both Boateng and the district attorney appealed the verdict. On 2 November 2022, the appeals court revised the sentence to 120 days. The fine was lowered to Boateng's current income. In July 2024, Boateng was found guilty of causing bodily harm. His sentence was reduced to a suspended fine of €200,000 and a payment of €100,000 to charity. In 2025, following public backlash, Barcelona and Bayern Munich released statements severing Boateng’s coach-in-training ties to the clubs.

== Career statistics ==
=== Club ===
Appearances and goals by club, season and competition
Club	Season	League			National cup (Note: Includes DFB-Pokal, FA Cup)		Europe		Other		Total	
Club	Season	Division	Apps	Goals	Apps	Goals	Apps	Goals	Apps	Goals	Apps	Goals
Hertha BSC II	2005–06	Regionalliga Nord	9	1	—		—		—		9	1
Hertha BSC II	2006–07	Regionalliga Nord	15	0	—		—		—		15	0
Hertha BSC II	Total		24	1	—		—		—		24	1
Hertha BSC	2006–07	Bundesliga	10	0	1	0	0	0	0	0	11	0
Hamburger SV	2007–08	Bundesliga	27	0	3	0	7 (Note: Appearances in UEFA Cup)	0	—		37	0
Hamburger SV	2008–09	Bundesliga	21	0	5	0	9	0	—		35	0
Hamburger SV	2009–10	Bundesliga	27	0	1	0	13 (Note: Appearances in UEFA Europa League)	1	—		41	1
Hamburger SV	Total		75	0	9	0	29	1	—		113	1
Manchester City	2010–11	Premier League	16	0	3	0	5	0	0	0	24	0
Bayern Munich	2011–12	Bundesliga	27	0	6	0	15 (Note: Appearances in UEFA Champions League)	0	—		48	0
Bayern Munich	2012–13	Bundesliga	26	2	4	0	9	0	1 (Note: Appearance in DFL-Supercup)	0	40	2
Bayern Munich	2013–14	Bundesliga	25	1	5	0	9	0	4 (Note: One appearance in DFL-Supercup, one appearance in UEFA Super Cup, two appearances in FIFA Club World Cup)	0	43	1
Bayern Munich	2014–15	Bundesliga	27	0	5	0	11	3	1	0	44	3
Bayern Munich	2015–16	Bundesliga	19	0	4	0	7	0	1	0	31	0
Bayern Munich	2016–17	Bundesliga	13	0	2	0	6	0	0	0	21	0
Bayern Munich	2017–18	Bundesliga	19	1	3	1	9	0	0	0	31	2
Bayern Munich	2018–19	Bundesliga	20	0	3	0	5	0	0	0	28	0
Bayern Munich	2019–20	Bundesliga	24	0	4	0	9	0	1	0	38	0
Bayern Munich	2020–21	Bundesliga	29	1	1	0	7	1	2 (Note: One appearance in UEFA Super Cup, one appearance in FIFA Club World Cup)	0	39	2
Bayern Munich	Total		229	5	38	1	86	4	10	0	364	10
Lyon	2021–22	Ligue 1	24	0	0	0	3	0	—		27	0
Lyon	2022–23	Ligue 1	8	0	0	0	—		—		8	0
Lyon	Total		32	0	0	0	3	0	—		35	0
Salernitana	2023–24	Serie A	7	0	—		—		—		7	0
LASK	2024–25	Austrian Bundesliga	10	0	0	0	4 (Note: Two appearances in UEFA Europa League, two appearances in UEFA Europa Conference League)	0	—		14	0
Career total			403	6	51	1	127	5	10	0	601	12

=== International ===
Appearances and goals by national team and year
National team	Year	Apps	Goals
Germany	2009	2	0
Germany	2010	10	0
Germany	2011	7	0
Germany	2012	9	0
Germany	2013	8	0
Germany	2014	14	0
Germany	2015	7	0
Germany	2016	10	1
Germany	2017	1	0
Germany	2018	8	0
Total		76	1

List of international goals scored by Jérôme Boateng
No.	Date	Venue	Cap	Opponent	Score	Result	Competition
1	26 June 2016	Stade Pierre-Mauroy, Villeneuve-d'Ascq, France	63	Slovakia	1–0	3–0	UEFA Euro 2016

== Honours ==
Manchester City

- FA Cup: 2010–11

Bayern Munich

- Bundesliga: 2012–13, 2013–14, 2014–15, 2015–16, 2016–17, 2017–18, 2018–19, 2019–20, 2020–21
- DFB-Pokal: 2012–13, 2013–14, 2015–16, 2018–19, 2019–20
- DFL-Supercup: 2012, 2020
- UEFA Champions League: 2012–13, 2019–20
- UEFA Super Cup: 2013, 2020
- FIFA Club World Cup: 2013, 2020

Germany U21

- UEFA European Under-21 Championship: 2009

Germany

- FIFA World Cup: 2014; third place: 2010

Individual

- Fritz Walter Medal U19 Bronze: 2007
- Classification as world class in the kicker Ranking of German Football: Winter 2014/15, Winter 2015/16, Summer 2016
- Bundesliga Team of the Season: 2014–15, 2015–16
- kicker Defender of the Year: 2014–15, 2015–16
- UEFA European Championship Team of the Tournament: 2016
- Germany Footballer of the year: 2015–16
- Moses Mendelssohn Prize: 2016
- UEFA Team of the Year: 2016

Orders

- Silbernes Lorbeerblatt: 2010, 2014
