= Utscheid =

- Municipality
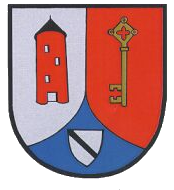
- Coat of arms

- Location of Utscheid within Eifelkreis Bitburg-Prüm district
- Interactive map of Utscheid
- Location within Germany Location within Rhineland-Palatinate
- Coordinates: 49°59′43″N 6°21′15″E
- Country: Germany
- State: Rhineland-Palatinate
- District: Eifelkreis Bitburg-Prüm
- Municipal assoc.: Südeifel

Government
  - Mayor (2019–24): Johann Reuter

Area
  - Total: 5.75 km^{2} (2.22 sq mi)
- Elevation: 330 m (1,080 ft)

Population (2025-12-31)
  - Total: 430
  - Density: 75/km^{2} (190/sq mi)
- Time zone: UTC+01:00 (CET)
  - Summer (DST): UTC+02:00 (CEST)
- Postal codes: 54675
- Dialling codes: 06564, 06527, 06522
- Vehicle registration: BIT
- Website: Utscheid at website www.suedeifelinfo.de

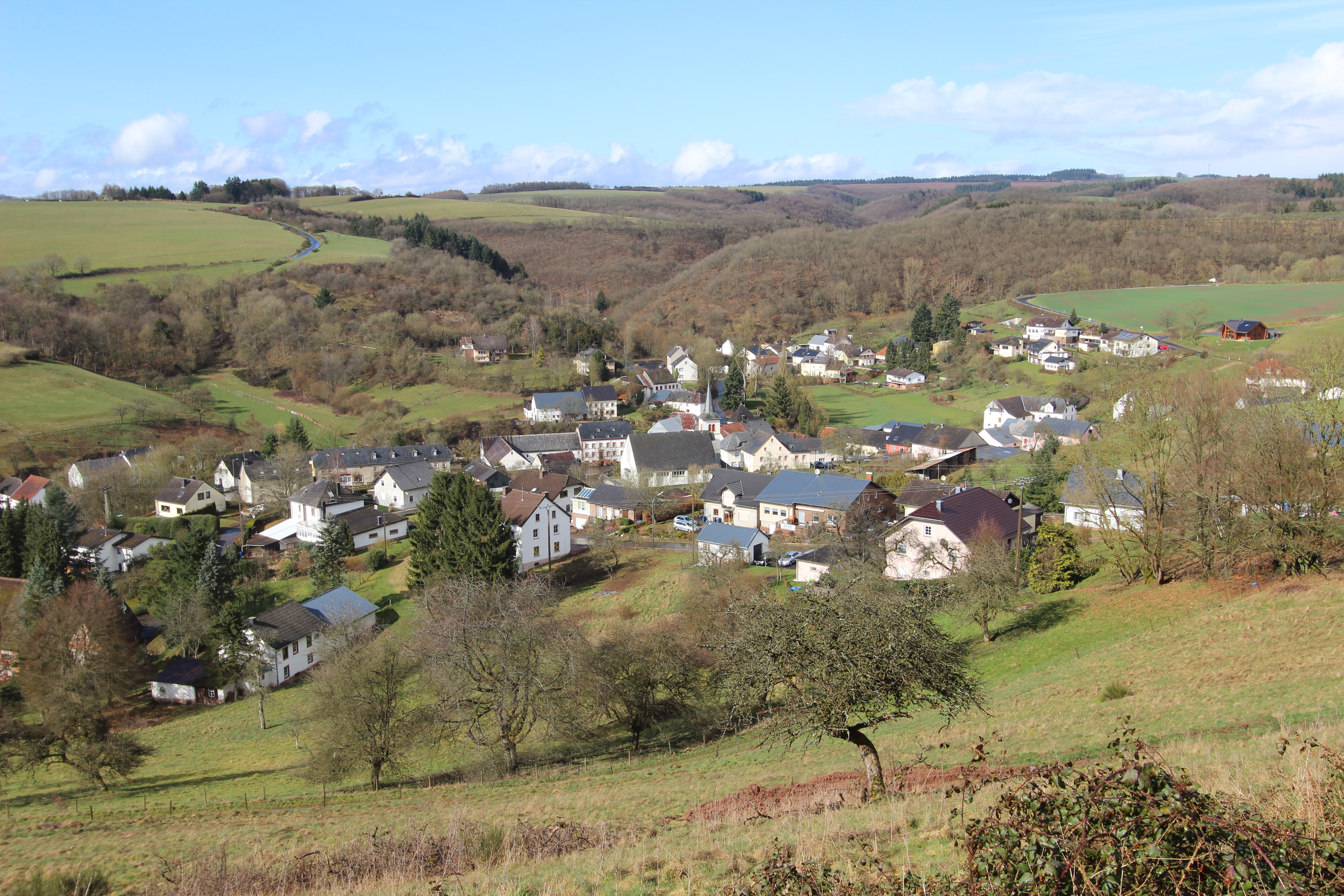
Utscheid in der Eifel

Utscheid is a municipality in the district of Bitburg-Prüm, in Rhineland-Palatinate, western Germany.

== Geography ==
Utscheid is located in the Southern Eifel Nature Park. The Michelbach flowing through the town flows into the Radenbach at Niederraden.

In addition to the main town include the districts Buscht, Glashütte, Hamerskaul, Neuhaus and Rußdorf to the community.

Neighboring municipalities are Fischbach-Oberraden, Weidingen, Hütterscheid, Baustert, Brimingen and Niederraden.

== Local council ==
The municipal council in Utscheid consists of eight council members, who were elected in a majority vote at the local election on 25 May 2014, and the honorary mayor as chairman. By 2009, the council had twelve council members.

== Population ==
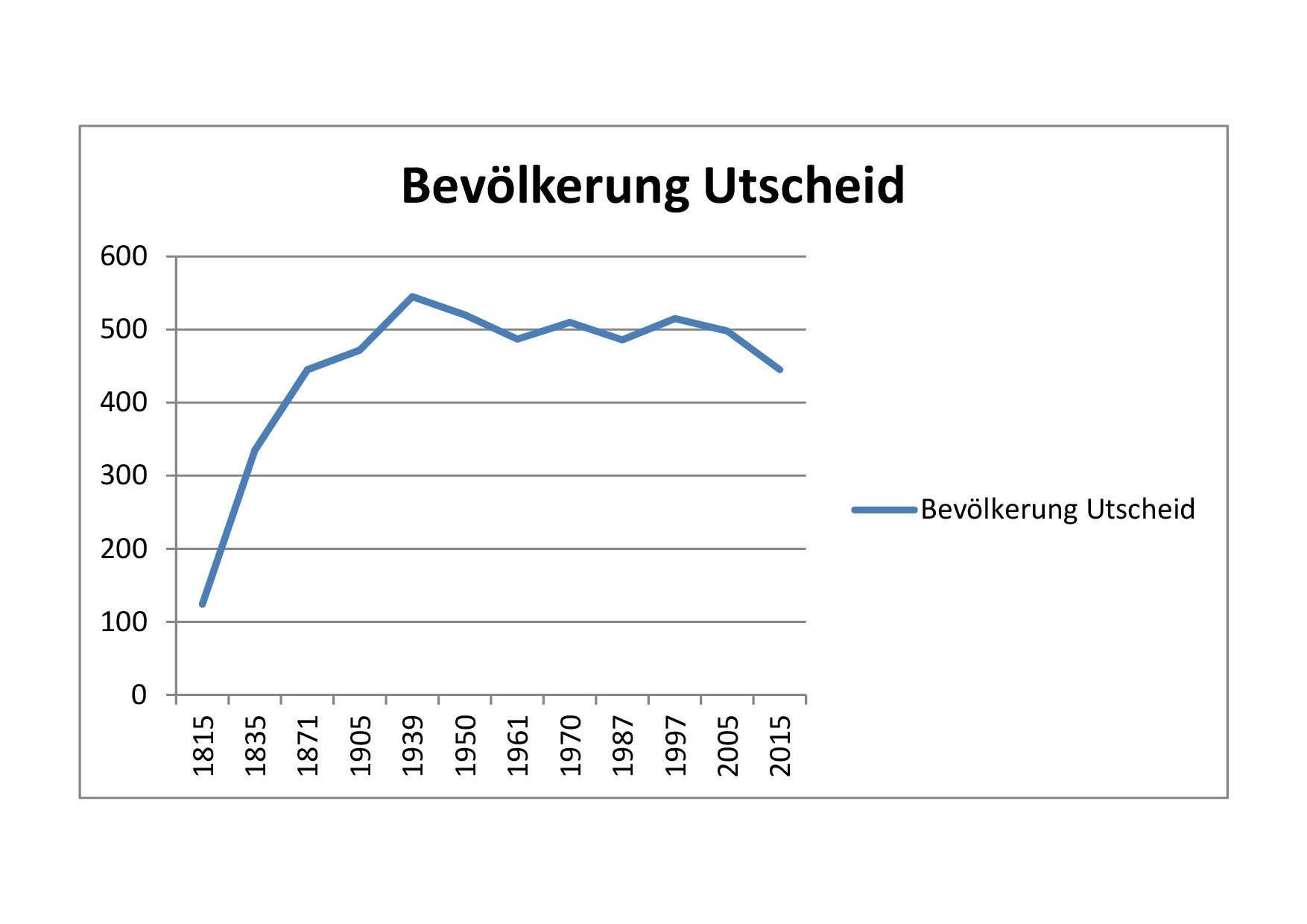

== Culture and sights ==
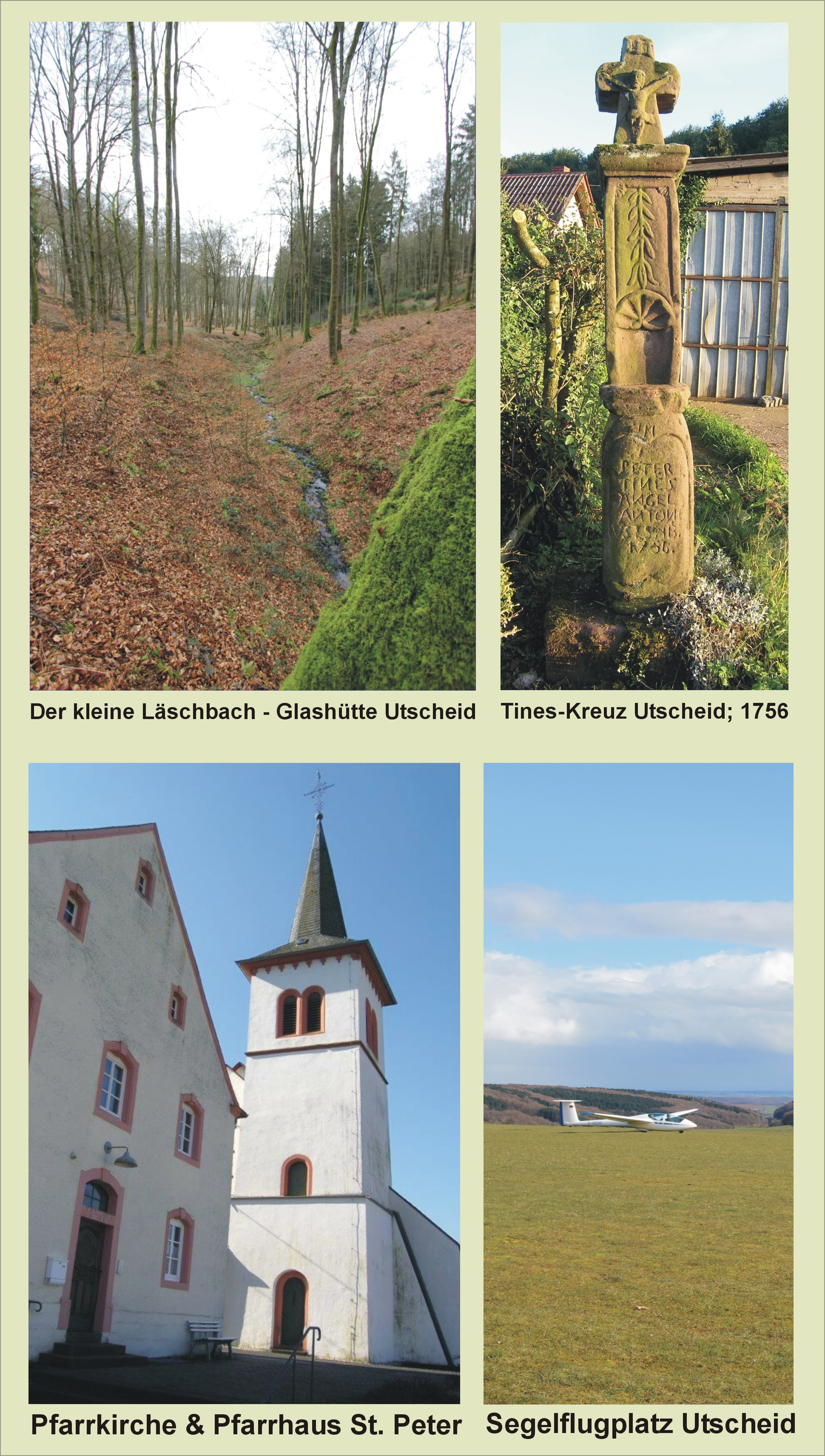
Attractions in Utscheid (Eifel)

=== Structures ===
- The church of St. Peter from 1746, with partly from the Middle Ages preserved tower, has an extensive Baroque equipment
- Catholic rectory of 1767
- The 16 m high circular water tower from 1956 - and rebuilt in 1993 by Oswald Mathias Ungers49.989312°N 6.358770°E
- Large farmhouse of 1800
- Crossroads (Tines-Kreuz) of 1756 49.992492°N 6.357510°E
- Residential and holiday home Villa Glashütte with pitched roof, built in the years 1986-88 by Oswald Mathias Ungers, on the edge of the municipality boundary, south of the villages Buscht and Russdorf, in a forest valley on Läschbach on the site of the former glassworks.49.984456°N 6.362017°E
- Municipal House - a conversion of the residential and warehouse of the former national product trade Weber by Oswald Mathias Ungers

=== Green areas and recreation ===
- Nature reserve "Tongrube bei Utscheid"49.977881°N 6.354537°E
- Hiking routes for example Michelbachtal, Glashütte or Fischbach
- Premium hiking trails of the Southern Eifel Nature Park
- Gliding area Utscheid

=== Regular events ===
- The annual church community festival is celebrated on Sunday after June 29 (Peter & Paul).
- Traditional ratchets or rattles on Good Friday and Holy Saturday
- Hut burning on the first weekend after Ash Wednesday (so-called Scheef Sunday)

== Photos ==
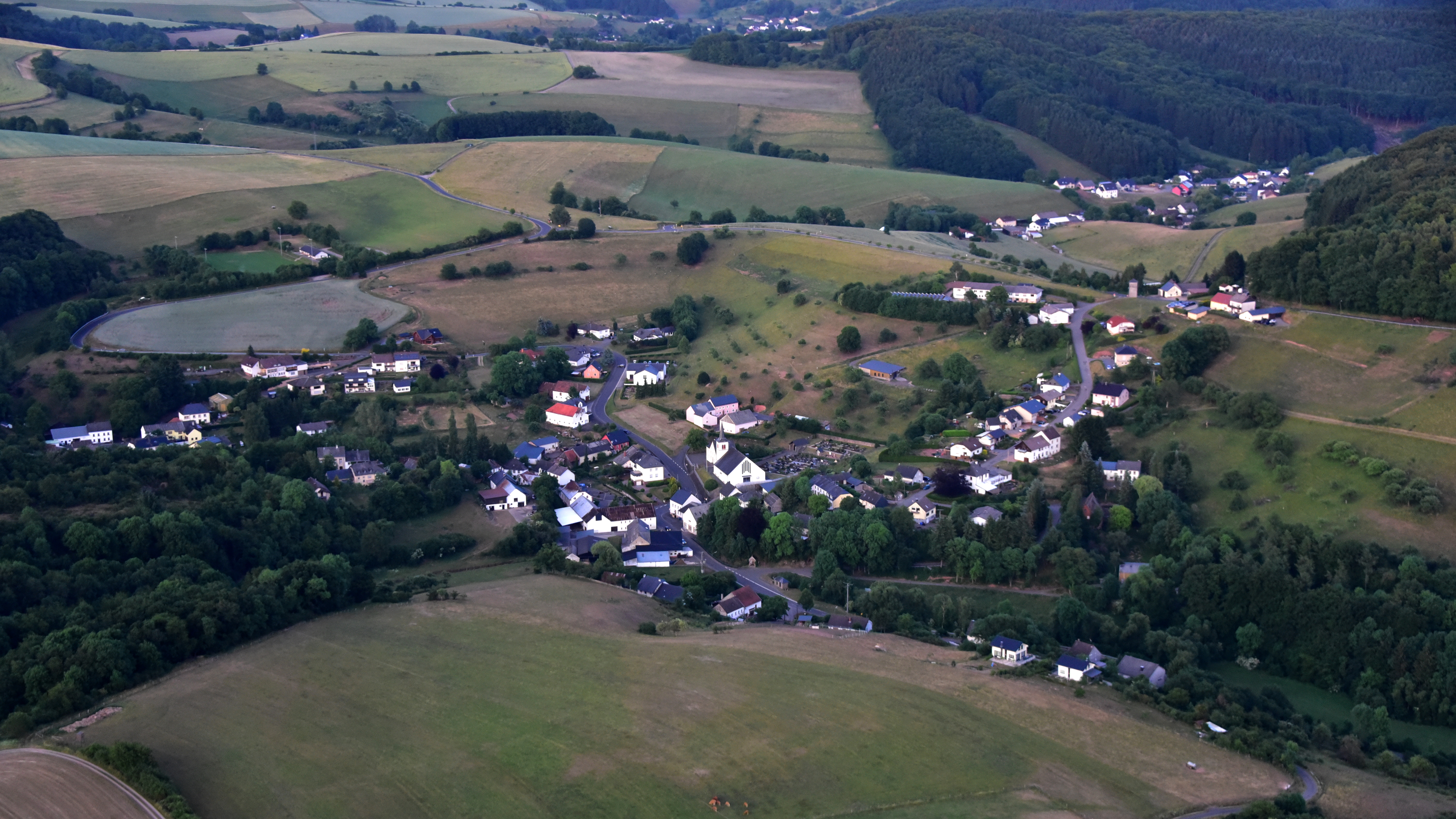
Utscheid, Aerial View (2017)

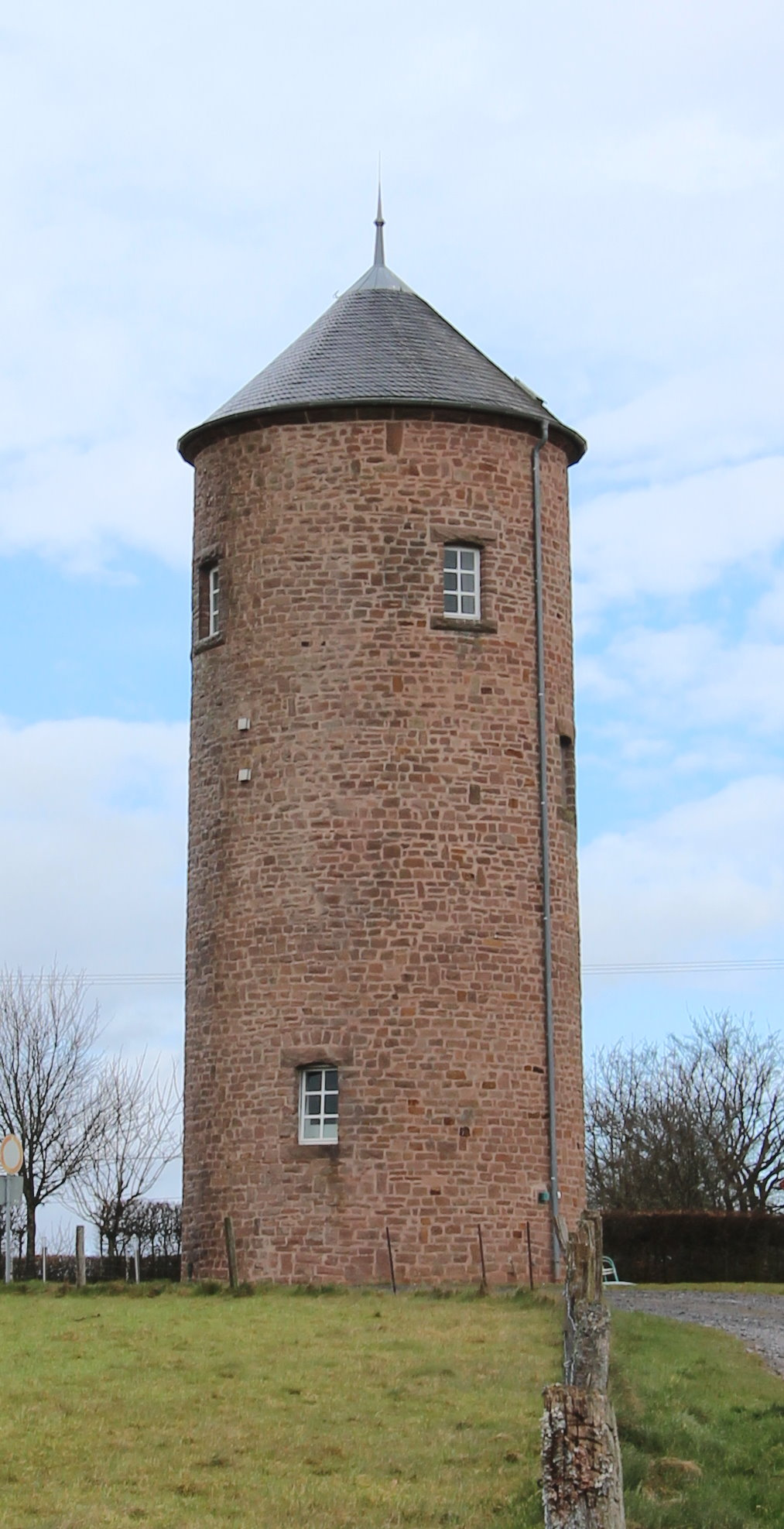
Water tower Buscht

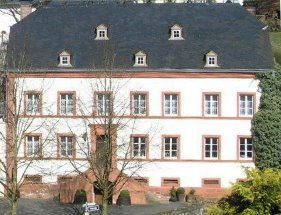
Impressive farmhouse

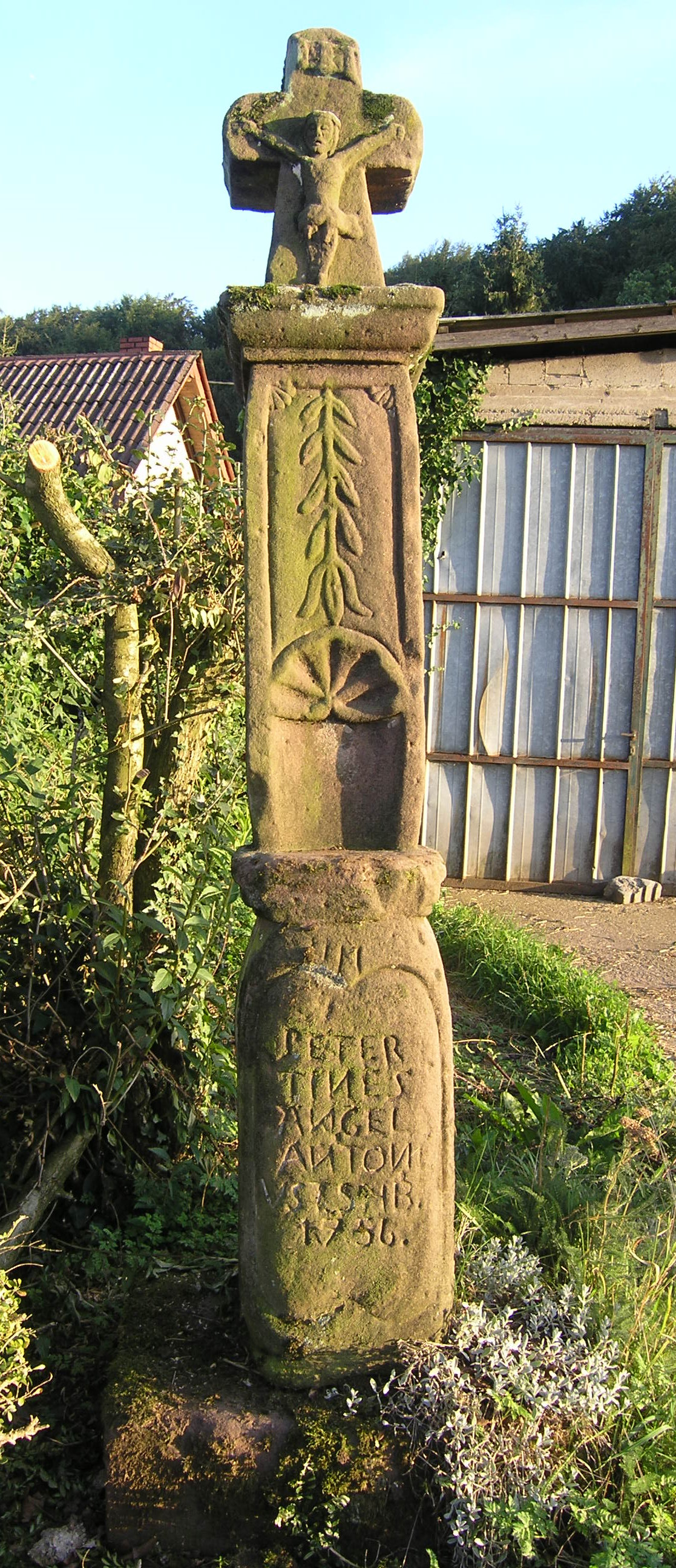
Crossroads of 1756, Bitburger Straße

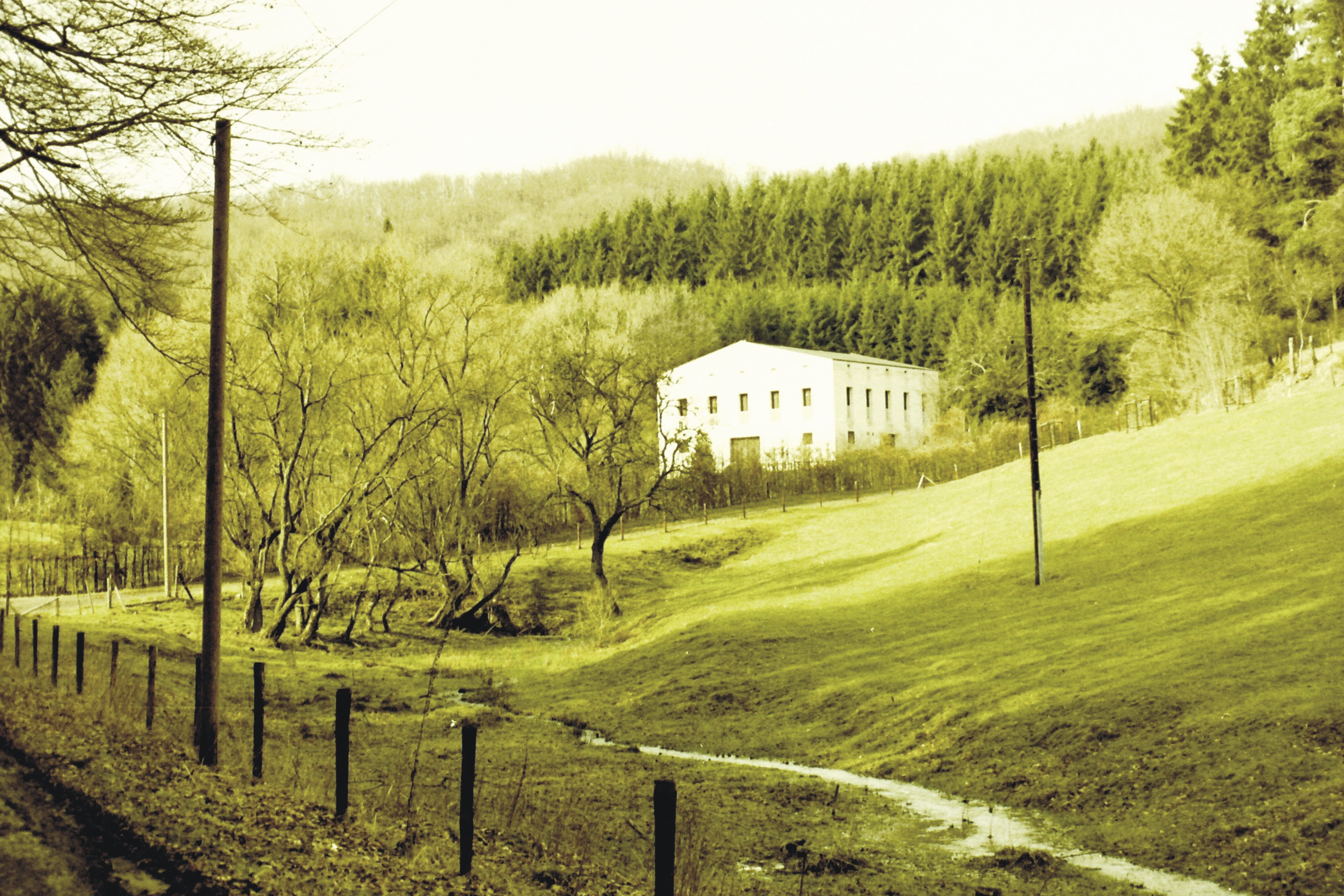
Glashütte Utscheid

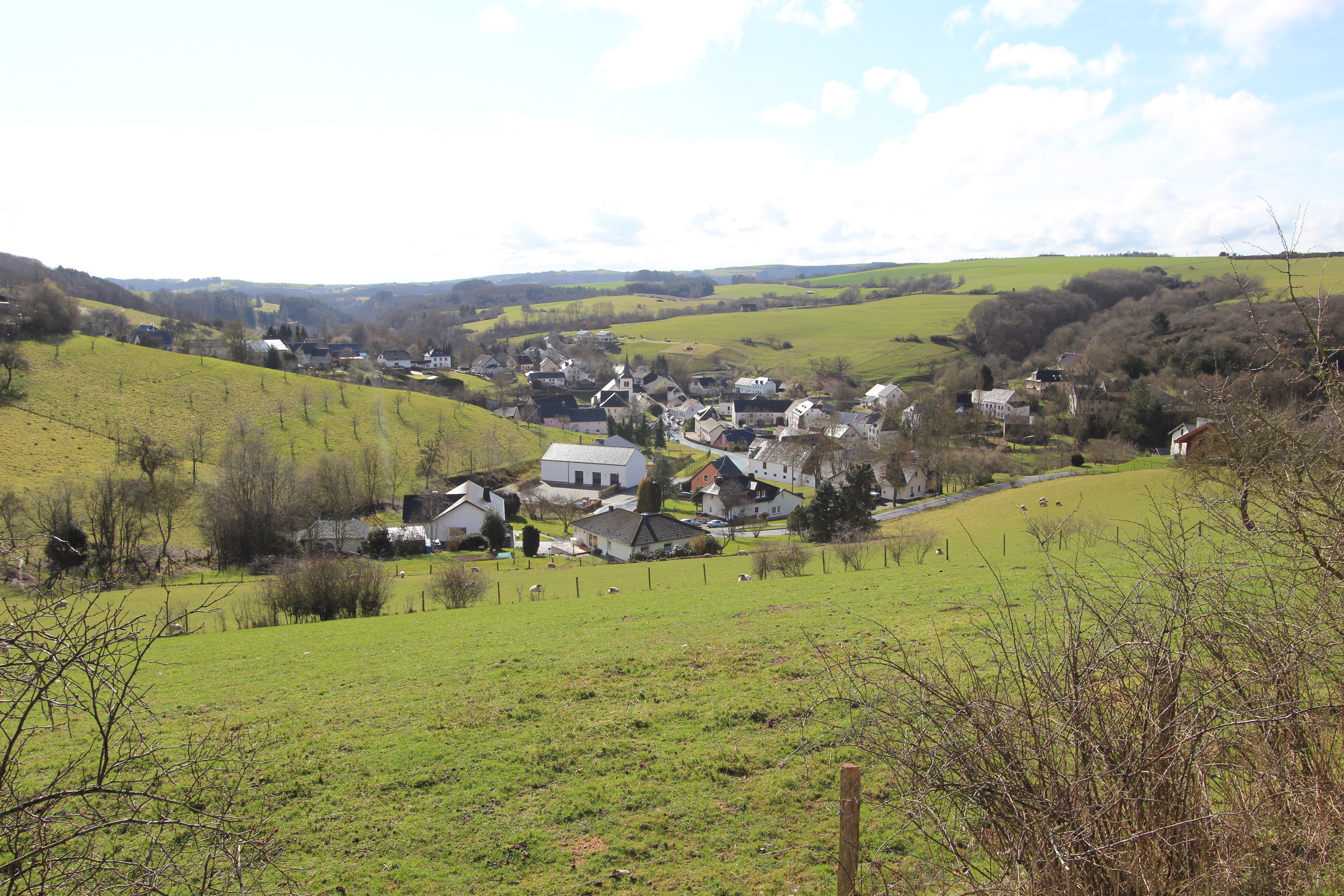
Panoramic view Utscheid (Eifel)

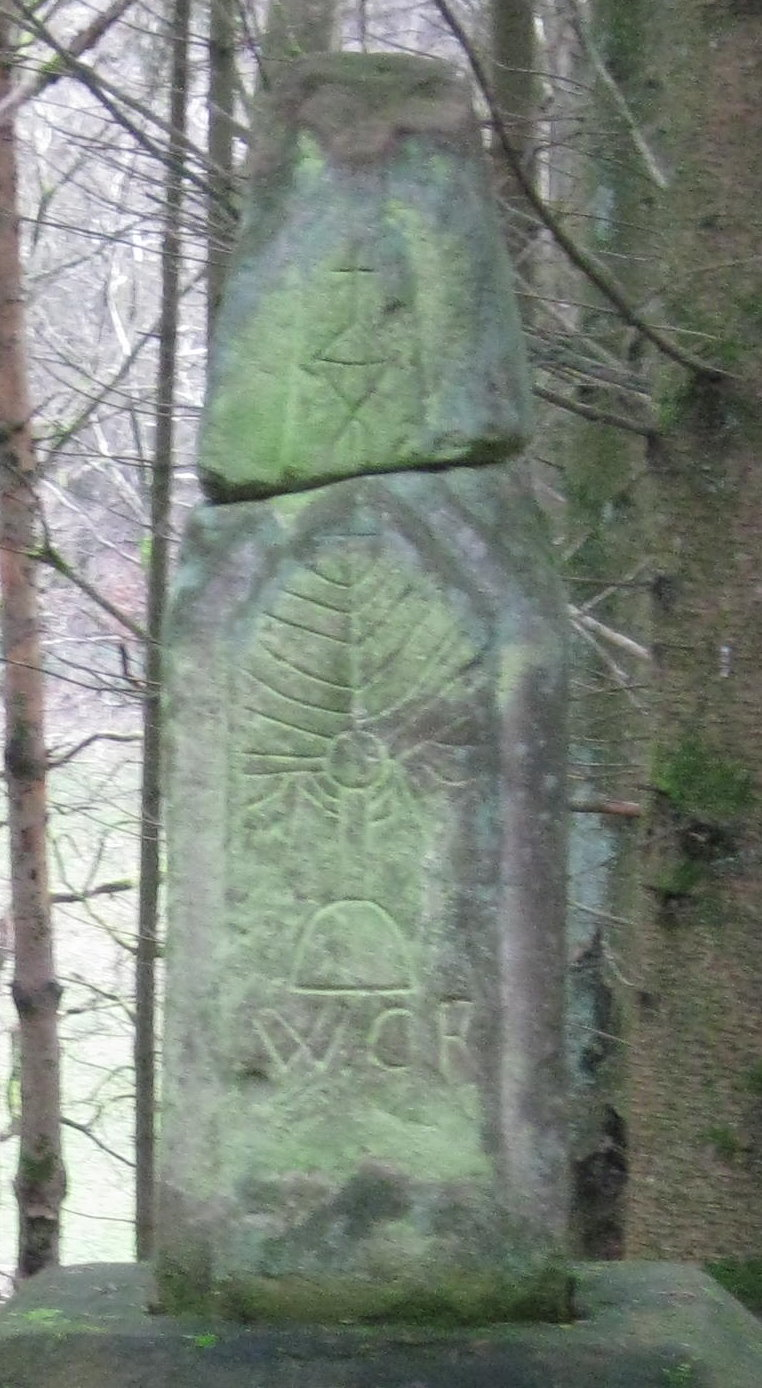
Stone from the time of the cultural struggle around 1872.

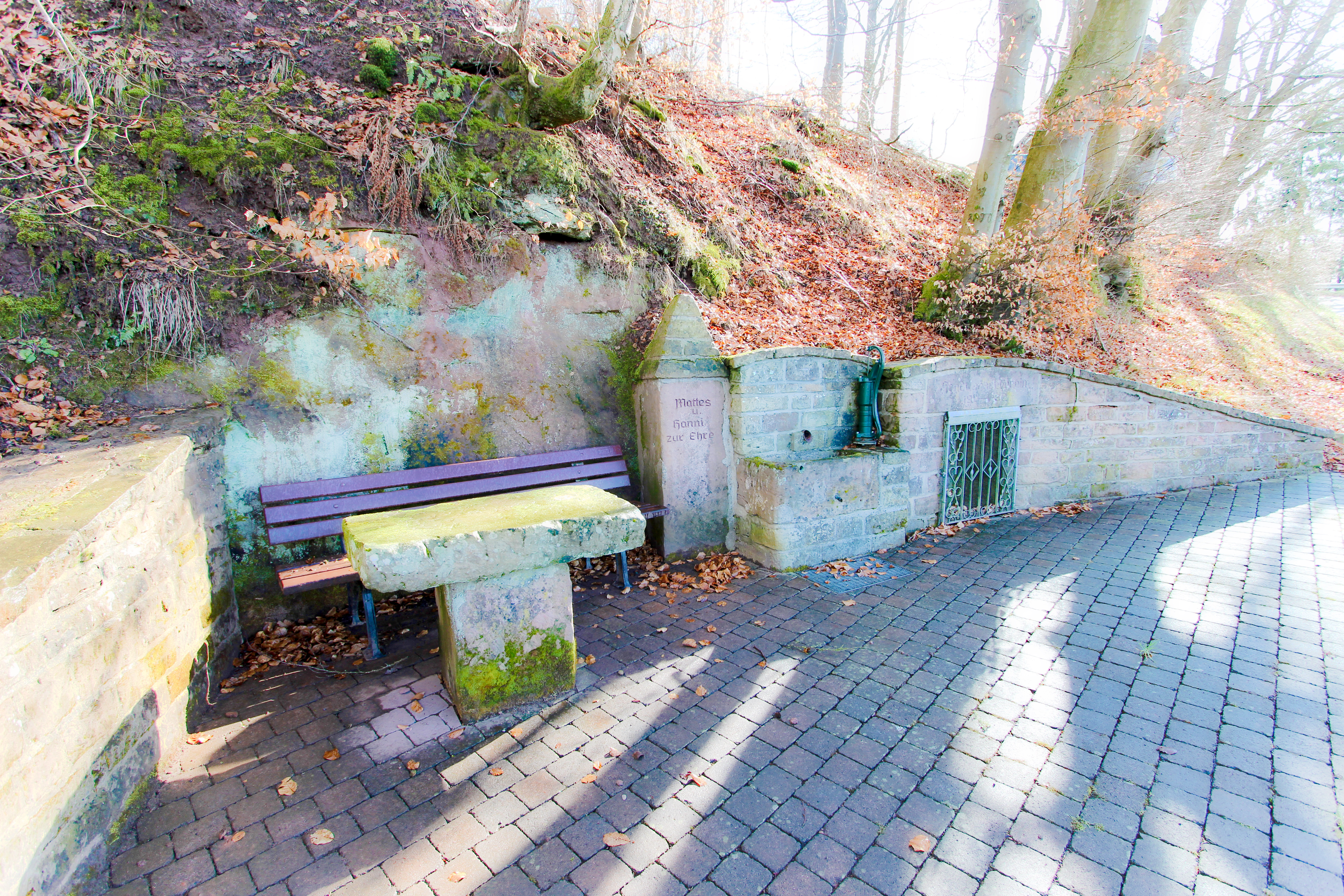
Fountain Utscheid-Buscht (Eifel)

== Literature ==
- Ernst Wackenroder: Rheinprovinz. – Die Kunstdenkmäler der Rheinprovinz. Die Kunstdenkmäler des Kreises Bitburg. Bd.12/I. Düsseldorf 1927. 4to. X, 315 S. Mit 12 Taf. u. 227 Abb. im Text. Seite 232. ISBN 978-3-88915-006-6.
- Pfarrei Utscheid 1330–1980. Festschrift / Hrsg. anläßl. d. Konsekration d. Pfarrkirche u. d. Orgelweihe, verb. mit d. 650jähr. Pfarrjubiläum, am 24.08.1980. Nebst. Beil. Bitburg. Burbach 1980.
- Pfarrhaus Utscheid umfassend renoviert und erweitert. In: Paulinus. Jg. 115. Trier 1989. Nr. 6. S. 30.
- Adolf Valentin, Johanna Roder, Egon Kirchen: 3 kleine Kapellen in unserer Heimat. In: Geschichtlicher Arbeitskreis der Pfarrei Baustert, Eifel (Hrsg.): Heimatbuch ous der Bouster Poar. Baustert Mai 2014, S. 117–121.
- Adolf Valentin: Die Glashütte bei Utscheid im Wandel der Zeit. In: Heimatkalender für den Kreis Bitburg-Prüm. 1980, S. 100–102.
- Johannes Nosbüsch (1929): „Watt mol wor“: der Schulweg. In: Heimatkalender Landkreis Bitburg-Prüm. 2007, S. 117–125.
- Martin Kieren: Eine Wiese, ein Haus: ein Versuch, mit der Form zu überleben: Oswald Mathias Ungers’ Haus in der Eifel. In: Deutsche Bauzeitung. 129, Juni 1995, S. 84–91.
- Lothar Monshausen: Ein Barockkreuz in Utscheid-Buscht. In: Heimatkalender Eifelkreis Bitburg-Prüm. 65. 2016, S. 129–130.
- Thomas Wieckhorst: Bescheidenheit und Zurückhaltung: Umnutzung eines kleinen Wasserturms in Utscheid zu Wohnzwecken. In: Bausubstanz. 12. Februar 1996, S. 26–28.
- Agnes Colling: Kulturdenkmal vor dem Verfall gerettet. In: Ous der Heemicht. Nr. 8, Juli 1997, S. 15–16.
- Rudolfine Schröter: Hügelgräber von Outscheid, Krs. Bitburg. In: Trierer Zeitschrift für Geschichte und Kunst des Trierer Landes und seiner Nachbargebiete. 30. 1967, S. 62–69.
- Karl Becker (Bearb. u. Gest.) (1968-10-25), Schulverband Mettendorf (ed.), Festschrift zur Weihe der Hauptschule Mettendorf [Krs. Bitburg] (in German), Mit Beiträgen z. Geschichte d. Schulwesens u. a. in Outscheid, Merzig, (60 pages)
