= Hisel =

- Ortsteil of Brimingen
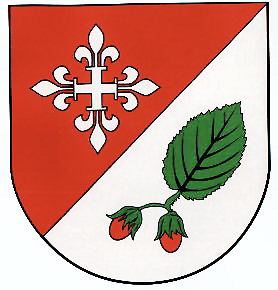
- Coat of arms
- Interactive map of Hisel
- Location within Germany Location within Rhineland-Palatinate
- Coordinates: 49°57′43″N 06°22′30″E
- Country: Germany
- State: Rhineland-Palatinate
- District: Eifelkreis Bitburg-Prüm
- Municipality: Brimingen

Area
  - Total: 2.13 km^{2} (0.82 sq mi)
- Elevation: 370 m (1,210 ft)

Population (2015-12-31)
  - Total: 10
  - Density: 4.7/km^{2} (12/sq mi)
- Time zone: UTC+01:00 (CET)
  - Summer (DST): UTC+02:00 (CEST)
- Postal codes: 54646
- Dialling codes: 06527
- Vehicle registration: BIT
- Website: Hisel at the Bitburger Land website www.bitburgerland.de

Hisel (German pronunciation: [ˈhiːzl̩]) is a village and a former municipality in the district of Bitburg-Prüm, in Rhineland-Palatinate, western Germany. Since January 2018, it is part of the municipality Brimingen.
