= Radim Kučera =

Czech footballer (born 1974)

Personal information
- Date of birth: 1 March 1974 (age 52)
- Place of birth: Valašské Meziříčí, Czechoslovakia
- Height: 1.88 m (6 ft 2 in)
- Position: Defender

Team information
- Current team: FK Frýdek-Místek (sporting director)

Youth career
- 1980–1992: TJ Vigantice

Senior career*
Years	Team	Apps	(Gls)
1992–1993	FK Dukla Hranice		
1993–1995	VP Frýdek-Místek		
1995–1998	Kaučuk Opava	85	(3)
1998–2005	Sigma Olomouc	192	(22)
2005–2010	Arminia Bielefeld	120	(8)
2010–2012	Sigma Olomouc	45	(0)

Managerial career
- 2013–2014: SK Sigma Olomouc B
- 2014–2015: SFC Opava (assistant)
- 2015–2017: 1. SC Znojmo
- 2017–2018: FC Baník Ostrava
- 2018–2020: FC Vysočina Jihlava
- 2020–2021: Czech Republic U20 (assistant)
- 2020–2021: FK Teplice
- 2024: 1. SK Prostějov
- 2024: MFK Ružomberok
- 2025–: FK Frýdek-Místek (sporting director)
- * Club domestic league appearances and goals

Radim Kučera (born 1 March 1974) is a Czech football coach and former player who played most of his career for Sigma Olomouc.

== Playing career ==
Kučera began his playing career in the Czech league, playing for FK Dukla Hranice, VP Frýdek-Místek and Kaučuk Opava. He moved to Gambrinus liga side Sigma Olomouc, where he would become captain. He appeared in 280 Czech league matches before moving to Bundesliga side Arminia Bielefeld in August 2005.

When Kučera joined Arminia, fellow Czechs Petr Gabriel and David Kobylík were in the squad, which helped him adjust to Bundesliga football. His five-year spell with Arminia was marked with several relegation battles, culminating in relegation after the 2008–09 season.

Despite being one of the most successful Czech football players during his time with Sigma Olomouc and also in Germany with Arminia, Kučera has never played for the Czech Republic national team.

== Honours ==
Sigma Olomouc

- Czech Cup: 2011–12
