= Brimingen =

- Municipality
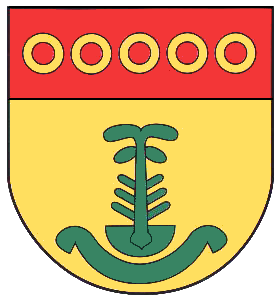
- Coat of arms

- Location of Brimingen within Eifelkreis Bitburg-Prüm district
- Interactive map of Brimingen
- Location within Germany Location within Rhineland-Palatinate
- Coordinates: 49°58′12″N 06°21′54″E
- Country: Germany
- State: Rhineland-Palatinate
- District: Eifelkreis Bitburg-Prüm
- Municipal assoc.: Bitburger Land

Government
  - Mayor (2018–24): Peter Neyses

Area
  - Total: 5.92 km^{2} (2.29 sq mi)
- Elevation: 400 m (1,300 ft)

Population (2025-12-31)
  - Total: 103
  - Density: 17.4/km^{2} (45.1/sq mi)
- Time zone: UTC+01:00 (CET)
  - Summer (DST): UTC+02:00 (CEST)
- Postal codes: 54646
- Dialling codes: 06522
- Vehicle registration: BIT
- Website: Brimingen at the Bitburger Land website

Brimingen is a municipality in the district of Bitburg-Prüm, in Rhineland-Palatinate, western Germany. In January 2018 the former municipality of Hisel was merged into Brimingen.
