= Ivica Olić =

Croatian football manager (born 1979)

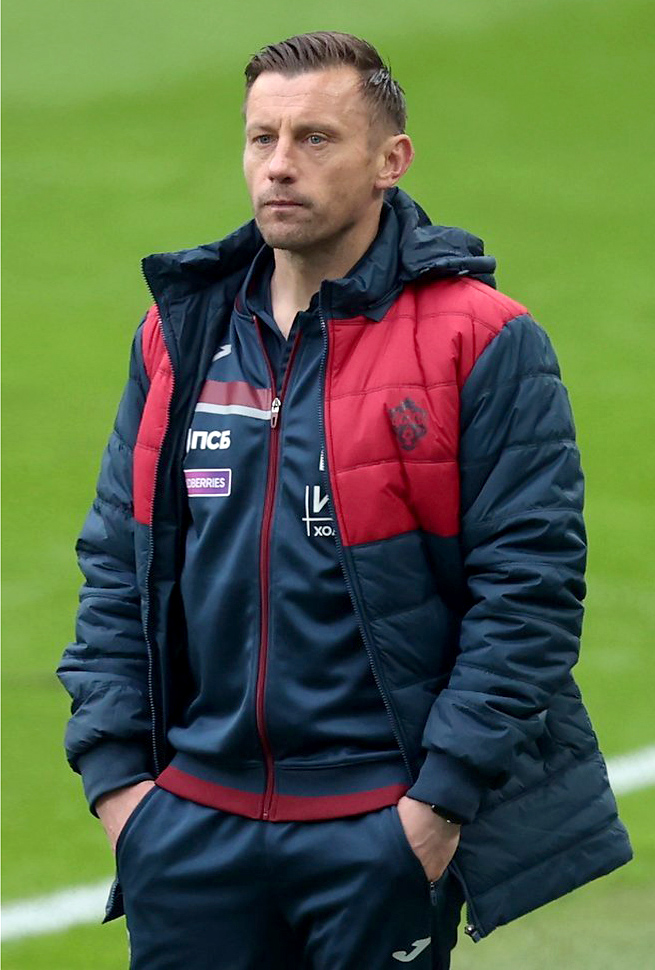
- Olić coaching CSKA Moscow in 2021

Personal information
- Full name: Ivica Olić
- Date of birth: 14 September 1979 (age 47)
- Place of birth: Davor, SR Croatia
- Height: 1.82 m (6 ft 0 in)
- Positions: Striker; winger

Team information
- Current team: Croatia U21 (manager)

Youth career
- Posavac Davor
- Marsonia

Senior career*
Years	Team	Apps	(Gls)
1996–1998	Marsonia	42	(17)
1998–2000	Hertha BSC II	30	(10)
1998–2000	Hertha BSC	2	(0)
2000–2001	Marsonia	42	(21)
2001–2002	→ NK Zagreb (loan)	28	(21)
2002–2003	Dinamo Zagreb	27	(16)
2003–2007	CSKA Moscow	78	(35)
2007–2009	Hamburger SV	78	(29)
2009–2012	Bayern Munich	55	(13)
2012–2015	VfL Wolfsburg	78	(28)
2015–2016	Hamburger SV	25	(2)
2016–2017	1860 Munich	30	(5)
Total		515	(197)

International career
1996	Croatia U17	3	(0)
1997	Croatia U18	1	(0)
1997–1998	Croatia U19	9	(1)
1998	Croatia U20	1	(0)
2000–2001	Croatia U21	6	(2)
2002–2015	Croatia	104	(20)

Managerial career
- 2017–2021: Croatia (assistant)
- 2021: CSKA Moscow
- 2021–2024: Croatia (assistant)
- 2024–: Croatia U21
Medal record
Men's football
Representing Croatia (assistant coach)
FIFA World Cup
Runner-up	2018
Third place	2022
- * Club domestic league appearances and goals

Ivica Olić (Croatian pronunciation: [îʋitsa ǒːlitɕ]; born 14 September 1979) is a Croatian professional football manager and former player who is a coach of the Croatia U-21.

During his career, Olić played for German Bundesliga clubs such as Hamburger SV, VfL Wolfsburg and Bayern Munich; won the 2004–05 UEFA Cup with CSKA Moscow; and appeared over 100 times for the Croatia national team. Olić primarily played as a striker but could also operate as a winger. Noted as an emblematic clutch player, Olić was known for his high work rate. Named the Croatian Footballer of the Year in 2009 and 2010, Olić appeared with Bayern Munich in two UEFA Champions League finals, in 2010 and 2012.

Olić represented Croatia at three FIFA World Cups, in 2002, 2006 and 2014. And two UEFA European Championships, in 2004 and 2008; earning his 100th cap on 16 November 2014, before retiring from international football in 2015.

He started his coaching career in 2017, joining the coaching staff upon appointment of Zlatko Dalić as Croatia national team head coach. He helped the team reach the 2018 FIFA World Cup Final and qualify for UEFA Euro 2020, interrupting his tenure with the team to briefly coach his former club CSKA Moscow.

== Club career ==
=== Early career ===
Olić was born and raised in the village of Davor near Slavonski Brod, Croatia. He started playing football for the local club NK Marsonia in 1996, and spent two good seasons there, before he was acquired by German club Hertha BSC in 1998. He did not see much play there and returned to Marsonia the following year, where he earned promotion to the top flight after winning the Croatian Second League with his team.

After another successful season at Marsonia, in the 2000–01 season, he scored 17 goals in 29 games – in 2001, he moved to NK Zagreb on loan, where he scored 21 goals in 28 appearances and helped his team win the league. The following season, he was transferred to Dinamo Zagreb, where he scored 16 goals in 27 games, and became the best striker in the Croatian First League.

=== CSKA Moscow ===
In 2003, Olić was acquired by CSKA Moscow. His form rose gradually, and in the 2005 season, he contributed with ten goals in twice as many games. With CSKA Moscow, he won the UEFA Cup in 2005, the Russian Premier League three times (in 2003, 2005 and 2006), the Russian Cup twice (in 2005 and 2006), and twice the Russian Super Cup (2004 and 2006).

After winning the UEFA Cup, Olić was awarded with the Order of Friendship by the Russian Federation.

=== Hamburger SV ===
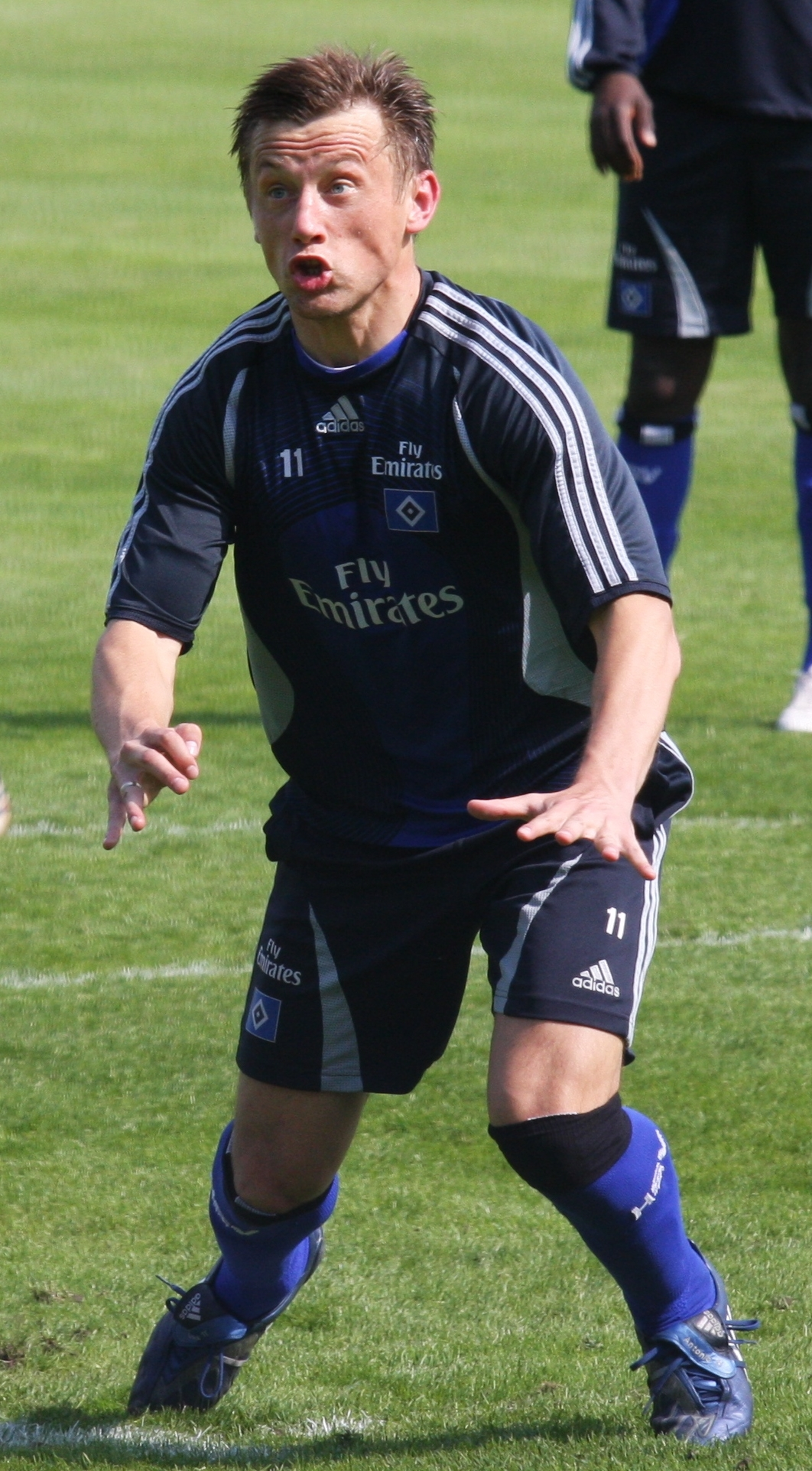
Olić with HSV in 2008

In January 2007, Olić moved to Hamburger SV, playing his first Bundesliga match with them against Energie Cottbus on 31 January. He was signed because Hamburg were in deep trouble, finishing in the relegation zone before the winter break. It worked out in the end, and Hamburg finished seventh, which even acquired them a UEFA Intertoto Cup place, which they eventually won. He scored two goals in the last match in the 2006–07 Bundesliga season against Alemannia Aachen in a 4–0 win. In October 2007, Olić scored a hat-trick in the Bundesliga match against VfB Stuttgart, which Hamburg won 4–1. He was the first player in the club's history to score three successive goals in one half.

Olić effectively won the 2008 Emirates Cup for Hamburg, with two injury time goals against Juventus, increasing the team's points tally to an unassailable level (due to the points-for-goals system). He endeared himself to Hamburg fans for his commitment and consistent work rate on the pitch. In his last game for the north German club, he sported a T-shirt with the words, "Danke fans" ("Thank you, fans") written on it, as he bid farewell to the fans.

=== Bayern Munich ===
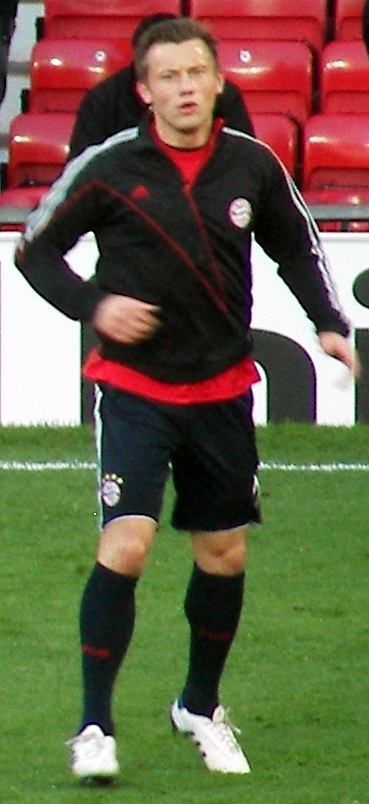
Olić with Bayern in 2010

On 3 January 2009, Olić signed a three-year contract with Bundesliga rivals Bayern Munich. He joined the club on a free transfer on 1 July 2009. Initially, he was supposed to be back-up to the likes of Miroslav Klose and Mario Gómez, but due to injury and fitness issues, he began to be preferred as the club's first choice. On 8 August, his Bayern debut, he scored the opening goal against 1899 Hoffenheim in a 1–1 draw and soon became a favourite with the Bayern fans.

He reached new heights upon scoring a crucial goal in the 2010 Champions League quarter-final (first leg) against Manchester United in injury time, to give Bayern a slender 2–1 lead. He also scored the first goal in the second leg for his team, but they trailed 3–1. The game ended 3–2. Bayern, however, won on away goals. He scored his first hat-trick for the Bavarians against Lyon, scoring with his left foot, right foot, and his head, in the Champions League semi-final second leg on 27 April 2010. The victory against Lyon secured his team a place in the final against Internazionale, which they eventually lost 2–0.

Olić missed most of the 2010–11 season through injury, undergoing knee surgery in November 2010. Olić spent nine months out injured, during which time he said that he considered retiring.

On 3 April 2012, he scored a brace in a 2–0 win against Marseille in the 2011–12 UEFA Champions League quarter-finals. Olić played his final game for Bayern in the 2012 UEFA Champions League Final against Chelsea, in which he came on as a 97th-minute substitute for the injured Franck Ribéry. Bayern eventually lost the game in a penalty shootout when the game ended 1–1 after extra time. Olić took the team's fourth penalty which was saved, as they lost the shootout 4–3.

=== VfL Wolfsburg ===
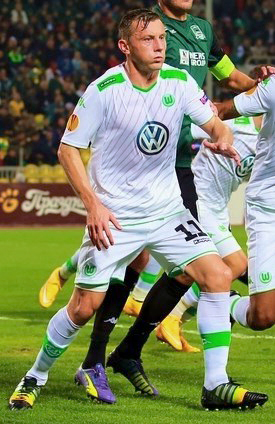
Olić playing for Wolfsburg in 2014

Olić signed for VfL Wolfsburg at the start of the 2012–13 season. He scored his first Bundesliga goal for Wolfsburg against Greuther Fürth, and he netted another one against Fortuna Düsseldorf. He started the season with a hat-trick against Schönberg 95 in the 2012–13 DFB-Pokal. He scored another goal in the quarter-final match of the DFB-Pokal against Kickers Offenbach on 26 February 2013, as Wolfsburg secured a spot in the semi-finals. He produced an "acrobatic overhead kick" to score the first of his two goals in a 5–2 win against SC Freiburg in March 2013. He finished the season as first-choice striker for the club, with 15 goals and 6 assists. On 24 April 2014, Olić signed a new two-year deal with the German side. In the opening match of the 2014–15 Bundesliga season, he scored a spectacular goal against his former club Bayern Munich.

=== Return to Hamburger SV ===
Olić returned to Hamburger SV on 30 January 2015 after signing an 18-month contract for an undisclosed fee. He was given kit number 8, but at the end of the 2014–15 season, Ivo Iličević changed his kit number from 11 to 7, prompting Olić to reclaim number 11, which he had worn previously at both Bayern and Wolfsburg, and also in his first spell at Hamburg.

=== 1860 Munich ===
On 26 July 2016, Olić signed a one-year deal with 2. Bundesliga side 1860 Munich. On 25 June 2017, Olić announced his retirement. Later, he revoked that comment saying "I know Bild published I am retiring, but that is not true. [...] Maybe I have played my last game and maybe not. It is the same as last summer – if I receive an offer that is good for me, I will continue."

== International career ==
Olić was part of the Croatia national team at the 2002 FIFA World Cup, where he played in two games and scored one important goal against Italy in a 2–1 Croatia victory. Shortly after scoring, Olić revealed a picture of his newly born child at the time under his jersey. He was remembered as being unable to put his jersey back on, as the material became tangled in the excitement during his celebration. Olić also played three games for Croatia at UEFA Euro 2004 and two games at the 2006 World Cup.

In September 2006, Olić was dropped from the Croatian squad for a Euro 2008 qualifying match for one game, due to a late-night partying binge together with Darijo Srna and Boško Balaban. He was named man of the match in the very last qualifier of their group, in which Croatia defeated England 3–2 at Wembley Stadium. He was named in Croatia's 23-man squad for the final tournament, and scored in their second Group B match against Germany to give the Croats a 2–1 shock win over the pre-tournament favourites.

Olić was recalled to the side for the 2010 World Cup qualifiers. He contributed with three goals in eight games, but Croatia missed out on a play-off spot by a point. Olić was injured in a friendly match against Norway, which was the cause of his last-moment absence in Euro 2012. On 22 March 2013, Olić scored his first goal since November 2011 and assisted Mario Mandžukić in a qualifier for the 2014 World Cup against Serbia. In the opening game of the finals, on 12 June, his left-wing cross led to the first goal of the tournament, deflected into his own net by Marcelo of Brazil. In the second group game against Cameroon on 18 June, Olić opened the scoring in the 11th minute for an eventual 4–0 win. It was his first goal after 12 years in the World Cup, a difference only previously matched by Denmark's Michael Laudrup, and with this goal he became his country's oldest World Cup goal-scorer.

On 16 November 2014, in a Euro 2016 qualifying match against Italy at the San Siro, Olić earned his 100th cap in a 1–1 draw. On 2 March 2016, Olić retired from international football in an open letter to the public. His final international was an October 2015 European Championship qualification match away against Malta. He scored 20 goals in 104 caps for his country.

== Managerial career ==
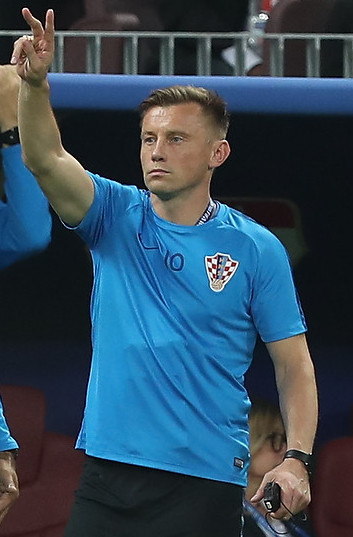
Olić as an assistant coach for Croatia in 2018

On 23 October 2017, Olić was presented as an assistant coach of newly appointed Croatia head coach Zlatko Dalić ahead of a World Cup qualifier against Greece.

In late March 2021, Sport-Express and Sportske novosti published a story about Olić succeeding Viktor Goncharenko at his former club CSKA Moscow. The rumours were confirmed by Croatia head coach Dalić to Sportske novosti. His assistant coaches were rumoured to be Miloš Krasić and Elvir Rahimić. The appointment was made official on 23 March 2021. The move was met with skepticism due to Olić's inexperience in the head coach job. Despite earlier rumours, Krasić and Rahimić were not hired as assistant coaches, instead Ilija Aračić was hired as an assistant coach, with previously hired Aleksei Berezutski and Dmitry Kramarenko rounding up the coaching staff. He made his debut on 4 April, in the 2–1 league victory over Tambov. After two more victories, Olić suffered his first defeat in his fourth match, 2–1 loss to Sochi on 18 April. On 25 April, he suffered his third defeat in a row after losing 1–0 to Spartak Moscow in his first Main Moscow derby, with CSKA's Ilzat Akhmetov getting sent off in the 37th minute. After losing 3–2 to Dynamo Moscow on 16 May, Olić finished the season in sixth place, with CSKA missing out on European competitions for the first time in 20 years. He was unexpectedly sacked on 15 June and succeeded by Berezutski, returning to Zlatko Dalić's team for the UEFA Euro 2020.

== Personal life ==
Olić and his Croatian-German wife Natalie have two sons and a daughter, named Luka, Antonio and Lara, respectively. Unlike many of his counterparts, he prefers to keep a low media profile and generally lives a quiet private life.

== Career statistics ==
=== Club ===
Club	Season	League			National cup (Note: Includes Croatian Football Cup, DFB-Pokal, Russian Cup)		Continental		Other		Total	
Club	Season	Division	Apps	Goals	Apps	Goals	Apps	Goals	Apps	Goals	Apps	Goals
Marsonia	1996–97	Prva HNL	9	0	0	0	—		—		9	0
Marsonia	1997–98	Druga HNL	24	9	1	0	—		—		25	9
Marsonia	1998–99	Treća HNL	9	8	1	0	—		—		10	8
Marsonia	Total		42	17	2	0	—		—		44	17
Hertha BSC	1998–99	Bundesliga	2	0	1	0	—		—		3	0
Hertha BSC II	1998–99	NOFV-Oberliga	15	9	—		—		—		15	9
Hertha BSC II	1999–2000	Regionalliga - Süd	15	1	—		—		—		15	1
Hertha BSC II	Total		30	10	0	0	—				30	10
Marsonia	1999–2000	Druga HNL	13	4	0	0	—		—		13	4
Marsonia	2000–01	Prva HNL	29	17	0	0	—		—		29	17
Marsonia	Total		42	21	0	0	—		—		43	21
NK Zagreb (loan)	2001–02	Prva HNL	28	21	2	0	—		—		30	23
Dinamo Zagreb	2002–03	Prva HNL	27	16	2	1	4	3	1 (Note: Appearance in Croatian Football Super Cup)	0	34	20
CSKA Moscow	2003	Russian Premier League	10	7	2	1	0	0	—		12	8
CSKA Moscow	2004	Russian Premier League	24	9	3	1	15 (Note: Appearances in UEFA Cup)	0	1 (Note: Appearance in Russian Super Cup)	0	43	10
CSKA Moscow	2005	Russian Premier League	20	10	5	1	0	0	—		25	11
CSKA Moscow	2006	Russian Premier League	24	9	5	2	8 (Note: Appearances in UEFA Champions League)	3	1	0	38	14
CSKA Moscow	Total		78	35	15	5	23	3	2	0	118	43
Hamburger SV	2006–07	Bundesliga	15	5	0	0	0	0	—		15	5
Hamburger SV	2007–08	Bundesliga	32	14	4	2	14	2	—		50	18
Hamburger SV	2008–09	Bundesliga	31	10	5	6	14	9	—		50	25
Hamburger SV	Total		78	29	9	8	28	11	—		115	48
Bayern Munich	2009–10	Bundesliga	29	11	2	1	10	7	—		41	19
Bayern Munich	2010–11	Bundesliga	6	0	1	0	2	0	1 (Note: Appearance in DFL-Supercup)	0	10	0
Bayern Munich	2011–12	Bundesliga	20	2	4	0	5	2	—		29	4
Bayern Munich	Total		55	13	7	1	17	9	1	0	80	23
VfL Wolfsburg	2012–13	Bundesliga	32	9	5	4	—		—		37	13
VfL Wolfsburg	2013–14	Bundesliga	32	14	5	1	—		—		37	15
VfL Wolfsburg	2014–15	Bundesliga	14	5	1	0	5 (Note: Appearances in UEFA Europa League)	0	—		20	5
VfL Wolfsburg	Total		78	28	11	5	5	0	—		94	33
Hamburger SV	2014–15	Bundesliga	16	2	0	0	—		2 (Note: Appearances in Bundesliga relegation play-offs)	0	18	2
Hamburger SV	2015–16	Bundesliga	9	0	1	1	—		—		10	1
Hamburger SV	Total		25	2	1	1	—		2	0	28	3
1860 Munich	2016–17	2. Bundesliga	30	5	1	0	—		2 (Note: Appearances in 2. Bundesliga relegation play-offs)	0	33	5
Career total			515	197	51	21	77	26	8	0	651	244

=== International ===
National team	Year	Apps	Goals
Croatia	2002	9	2
Croatia	2003	9	2
Croatia	2004	10	2
Croatia	2005	4	0
Croatia	2006	10	0
Croatia	2007	8	3
Croatia	2008	12	2
Croatia	2009	6	2
Croatia	2010	5	1
Croatia	2011	3	1
Croatia	2012	4	0
Croatia	2013	9	1
Croatia	2014	11	3
Croatia	2015	4	1
Total		104	20

Scores and results list Croatia's goal tally first.

No.	Date	Venue	Cap	Opponent	Score	Result	Competition
1	17 April 2002	Maksimir Stadium, Zagreb, Croatia	3	Bosnia and Herzegovina	1–0	2–0	Friendly
2	8 June 2002	Kashima Soccer Stadium, Kashima, Japan	5	Italy	1–1	2–1	2002 FIFA World Cup
3	30 April 2003	Råsunda Stadium, Stockholm, Sweden	12	Sweden	1–0	2–1	Friendly
4	11 October 2003	Maksimir Stadium, Zagreb, Croatia	17	Bulgaria	1–0	1–0	UEFA Euro 2004 qualifying
5	29 May 2004	Kantrida Stadium, Rijeka, Croatia	22	Slovakia	1–0	1–0	Friendly
6	5 June 2004	Parken Stadium, Copenhagen, Denmark	23	Denmark	2–0	2–1	Friendly
7	16 October 2007	Kantrida Stadium, Rijeka, Croatia	48	Slovakia	1–0	3–0	Friendly
8	16 October 2007	Kantrida Stadium, Rijeka, Croatia	48	Slovakia	3–0	3–0	Friendly
9	21 November 2007	Wembley Stadium, London, England	50	England	2–0	3–2	UEFA Euro 2008 qualifying
10	12 June 2008	Hypo-Arena, Klagenfurt, Austria	56	Germany	2–0	2–1	UEFA Euro 2008
11	15 October 2008	Maksimir Stadium, Zagreb, Croatia	62	Andorra	2–0	4–0	2010 FIFA World Cup qualification
12	12 August 2009	Dinamo Stadium, Minsk, Belarus	65	Belarus	1–0	3–1	2010 FIFA World Cup qualification
13	12 August 2009	Dinamo Stadium, Minsk, Belarus	65	Belarus	3–1	3–1	2010 FIFA World Cup qualification
14	3 September 2010	Skonto Stadium, Riga, Latvia	71	Latvia	2–0	3–0	UEFA Euro 2012 qualifying
15	11 November 2011	Türk Telekom Arena, Istanbul, Turkey	75	Turkey	1–0	3–0	UEFA Euro 2012 qualifying
16	22 March 2013	Stadion Maksimir, Zagreb, Croatia	82	Serbia	2–0	2–0	2014 FIFA World Cup qualification
17	5 March 2014	AFG Arena, St. Gallen, Switzerland	90	Switzerland	1–1	2–2	Friendly
18	5 March 2014	AFG Arena, St. Gallen, Switzerland	90	Switzerland	2–2	2–2	Friendly
19	18 June 2014	Arena da Amazônia, Manaus, Brazil	94	Cameroon	1–0	4–0	2014 FIFA World Cup
20	28 March 2015	Stadion Maksimir, Zagreb, Croatia	101	Norway	3–0	5–1	UEFA Euro 2016 qualifying

== Managerial statistics ==
As of 15 June 2021

Managerial record by team and tenure
Team	From	To	Record								Ref
Team	From	To	G	W	D	L	GF	GA	GD	Win %	Ref
CSKA Moscow	23 March 2021	15 June 2021	9	4	1	4	13	13	+0	44.44	
Career totals			9	4	1	4	13	13	+0	44.44	

== Honours ==
=== Player ===
Hertha BSC II

- NOFV-Oberliga: 1998–99

Marsonia

- Croatian Second League: 1999–2000

NK Zagreb

- Croatian First League: 2001–02

Dinamo Zagreb

- Croatian First League: 2002–03
- Croatian Super Cup: 2003

CSKA Moscow

- Russian Premier League: 2003, 2005, 2006
- Russian Cup: 2004–05, 2005–06
- Russian Super Cup: 2004, 2006
- UEFA Cup: 2004–05

Hamburger SV

- UEFA Intertoto Cup: 2007

Bayern Munich

- Bundesliga: 2009–10
- DFB-Pokal: 2009–10
- DFL-Supercup: 2010
- UEFA Champions League runner-up: 2009–10, 2011–12

Individual

- Croatian Football Hope of the Year: 2001
- SN Yellow Shirt Award: 2002, 2003
- Prva HNL Player of the Year: 2002
- Croatian First League top scorer: 2002, 2003
- Bundesliga Player of the Month: October 2007
- ARD Goal of the Month: November 2008, March 2013
- DFB Pokal Top scorer: 2008–09
- Croatian Footballer of the Year: 2009, 2010

=== Assistant manager ===
Croatia

- FIFA World Cup runner-up: 2018; third place: 2022

=== Orders ===
- Order of Friendship by Russia: 2005
- Order of Danica Hrvatska with face of Franjo Bučar: 2018
- Order of the Croatian Trefoil: 2018
- Order of the Croatian Interlace: 2018

== See also ==
- List of footballers with 100 or more caps
