= Šokac dialect =

Šokac (šokački jezik) was a language listed in Austro-Hungarian censuses. Population censuses performed in Austria-Hungary recorded the native language of the citizens, whereby Šokac was declared as native language to one part of the population, presumably members of the Šokci ethnic group. According to the 1910 census, the speakers of Šokac were recorded in the Bačka-Bodrog County, in the municipalities of Apatin, Baja, Odžaci, and Palanka. Although, not very different from Croatian or Serbian Shtokavian speech, Šokac could be identified along with Slavonian dialect of the Old-Shtokavian speech. Today, most of the members of the Šokci community declare themselves as Croats in the census, and their language as Croatian.

== Distribution ==
The Slavonian dialect is spoken by Šokci who live in some parts of Slavonia, Bačka, Baranja, Syrmia, in eastern Croatia, northern Serbia (Vojvodina), and Hungary, as well as in northern Bosnia. The Slavonian dialect has mixed Ikavian and Ekavian pronunciation. Ikavian accent is predominant in the Posavina, Baranja, Bačka, and in the Slavonian enclave of Derventa and Orašje, while Ekavian accent is predominant in Podravina. There are also enclaves of one accent in the territory of the other, as well as mixed Ekavian–Ikavian and Jekavian–Ikavian areas. In some villages in Hungary, the original yat is preserved. Local variants can widely differ with the degree of Neo-Shtokavian influence.

The oldest variant of this dialect persisted in some settlements of Sava river valley between Gradiška and Brod: chiefly in Davor, Orubica, Siče, and Magić-Mala. There the terminal l e.g. in the verb nosil has been retained (instead of modern nosio = carried), and pepel instead of new pepeo (ash). The old group "šć" is conserved instead of modern št e.g. šćap (not modern štap = stick), and the archaic accents are often terminal or penultimate, rarely initial in polysyllabic words. In some villages in the Podravina čr instead of the usual cr is preserved, for example in old črn instead of new crn (black). All these features are usual in Chakavian and Kajkavian, but rare Old-Shtokavian dialects also have these features.

== See also ==
- Šokci
- South Slavic languages
