= Tasmania Berlin =

Tasmania Berlin could refer to:

- SC Tasmania 1900 Berlin, a football team from Berlin which played from 1900 until 1973; or
- SV Tasmania Berlin, the successor club, which also plays in Berlin, formed from the above.
