= Demographic history of Croatian Baranja =

Demographic history of Croatian Baranja lists demographic information for the portion of the region of Baranja currently within the borders of the Republic of Croatia. Ownership of the area has changed many times since the first extant records of the people of the region were published.

== Early 16th century ==
In the early 16th century, before Ottoman conquest, Baranja was populated by Croats and Hungarians.

== 16th–17th century ==
During the Ottoman advances in the 16th and 17th centuries, there was a growing number of refugees from Serbia and Bosnia, both Catholic and Orthodox (Croats, Serbs, Vlachs, Montenegrins and others), entering Baranja. During the Habsburg-Ottoman wars, at the end of the 17th century, almost the entire Muslim population and a part of the Orthodox population, retreated, along with the Ottoman army. Nevertheless, some Croats, Hungarians and Orthodox settlers (especially Serbs and perhaps also some Vlachs) remained in the villages.

== 1711–1713 ==
In 1711–1713, in the southern (Croatian) Baranja, ethnic composition was:

- Serbs (39%) (*)
- Hungarians (37%)
- Croats (Šokci) (22%) (*)

(*) Total percent of South Slavs (Serbs and Croats/Šokci) in the area was 61%.

== 1721–1723 ==
In 1721–1723, in the southern (Croatian) Baranja, ethnic composition was:

- Hungarians (36%)
- Croats (31%) (*)
- Serbs (23%) (*)

(*) Total percent of South Slavs (Croats and Serbs) in the area was 54%.

== 1855 ==
In 1855, according to a religious population census in modern-day Croatian Baranja, there were 38,295 inhabitants in Baranja:

- 23,849 Roman Catholics (62.28%)
- 8,187 Calvinists (21.38%)
- 5,277 Eastern Orthodox (13.78%)
- 660 Reformists (1.72%)
- 322 Jews (0.84%)

== 1900 ==
According to Revai Lexicon (Volume II, p. 587) 1900, in the district of Branjin Vrh (whose borders roughly, but not entirely corresponded with southern, Croatian Baranja) there were 47,470 inhabitants. They include:

- Hungarians = 17,325 (36.50%)
- Germans = 12,324 (25.96%)
- Croats = 11,198 (23.59%) (*)
- Serbs = 5,873 (12.37%) (*)
- Others = 750 (1.58%)

(*) Total number of South Slavs (Croats and Serbs) in the area was 17,071 (35.96%).

== 1910 ==
In 1910, the population of southern (present-day Croatian) part of Baranja numbered 50,757 people, of whom:

- 20,313 (40.0%) spoke the Hungarian language
- 13,577 (26.7%) spoke the German language
- 6,194 (12.2%) spoke the Serbian language (*)
- 1,888 (3.7%) spoke the Croatian language (*)
- 58 spoke the Slovak language
- 2 spoke the Romanian language
- some 8,725 (17.2%) spoke other languages, in this case the Šokac language (*)

(*) Total number of speakers of South Slavic languages (Serbian, Croatian, and Šokac) in Croatian Baranja can be estimated at 15,000 (29.6%).

== 1920 ==
In 1920, in Yugoslav (now Croatian) Baranja, ethnic composition was:

- Germans = 16,253 (32.9%)
- Hungarians = 14,636 (29.6%)
- Šokci, Bunjevci, and Croats = 8,822 (17.8%) (*)
- Serbs = 6,782 (13.7%) (*)

(*) Total number of South Slavs (Šokci, Bunjevci, Croats, Serbs) in the area was 15,604 (31.5%).

== 1921 ==
In 1921, there was a population of 49,694 in Yugoslav (now Croatian) Baranja, including:

- Hungarians = 16,639 (33.5%)
- Germans = 15,955 (32.1%)
- Croats = 9,965 (20.0%) (*)
- Serbs = 6,782 (13.6%) (*)
- Other = 363 (0.7%)

(*) Total number of South Slavs (Croats and Serbs) in the area was 16,747 (33.7%).

According to another source, in 1921, the population of Yugoslav (now Croatian) Baranja numbered 49,452 people, of whom:

- 16,638 (33.65%) spoke Hungarian language
- 16,253 (32.87%) spoke German language
- 15,604 (31.55%) spoke Serbo-Croatian language

== 1931 ==
In 1931, in the Yugoslav (now Croatian) Baranja, ethnic composition was:

- Germans (29.8%)
- Hungarians (26.4%)
- Serbs (21.4%) (*)
- Croats (19.7%) (*)

(*) Total percent of South Slavs (Serbs and Croats) in the area was 40.7%.

== 1961 ==
In 1961, the population of Yugoslav/Croatian Baranja numbered 56,087 inhabitants, including:

- 23,514 (41.9%) Croats
- 15,303 (27.2%) Hungarians
- 13,698 (24.4%) Serbs

== 1991 ==
In 1991, the population of Yugoslav/Croatian Baranja had 54,265 inhabitants, including:

- 22,740 (41.91%) Croats
- 13,851 (25.52%) Serbs
- 8,956 (16.50%) Hungarians
- 4,265 (7.86%) Yugoslavs
- 4,453 (8.21%) others

According to another source, in 1991, the population of Yugoslav/Croatian Baranja included:

- 19,310 Croats
- 12,857 Serbs
- 9,920 Hungarians
- about 12,000 others (including Slovenes, Albanians, Germans, etc.).

== 1992 ==
In 1992 (during the war in Croatia), the population of Croatian Baranja (in that time administered by Republic of Serbian Krajina) numbered 39,482 inhabitants, including:

- 23,485 (59.41%) Serbs
- 7,689 (19.48%) Croats
- 6,926 (17.54%) Hungarians
- 490 (1.24%) Yugoslavs
- 919 (2.33%) others

== 2001 ==
In 2001, the population of Croatian Baranja numbered 42,633 inhabitants, including:

- Croats = 23,693 (55.57%)
- Serbs = 8,592 (20.15%)
- Hungarians = 7,114 (16.69%)
- others = 3,234 (7.58%)

== 2011 ==
In 2011, the population of Croatian Baranja numbered 39,420 inhabitants, including:

- Croats = 23,041 (58.45%)
- Serbs = 7,278 (18.46%)
- Hungarians = 5,980 (15.17%)
- others = 3,121 (7.92%)
