= Függetlenség =

Hungarian language daily newspaper

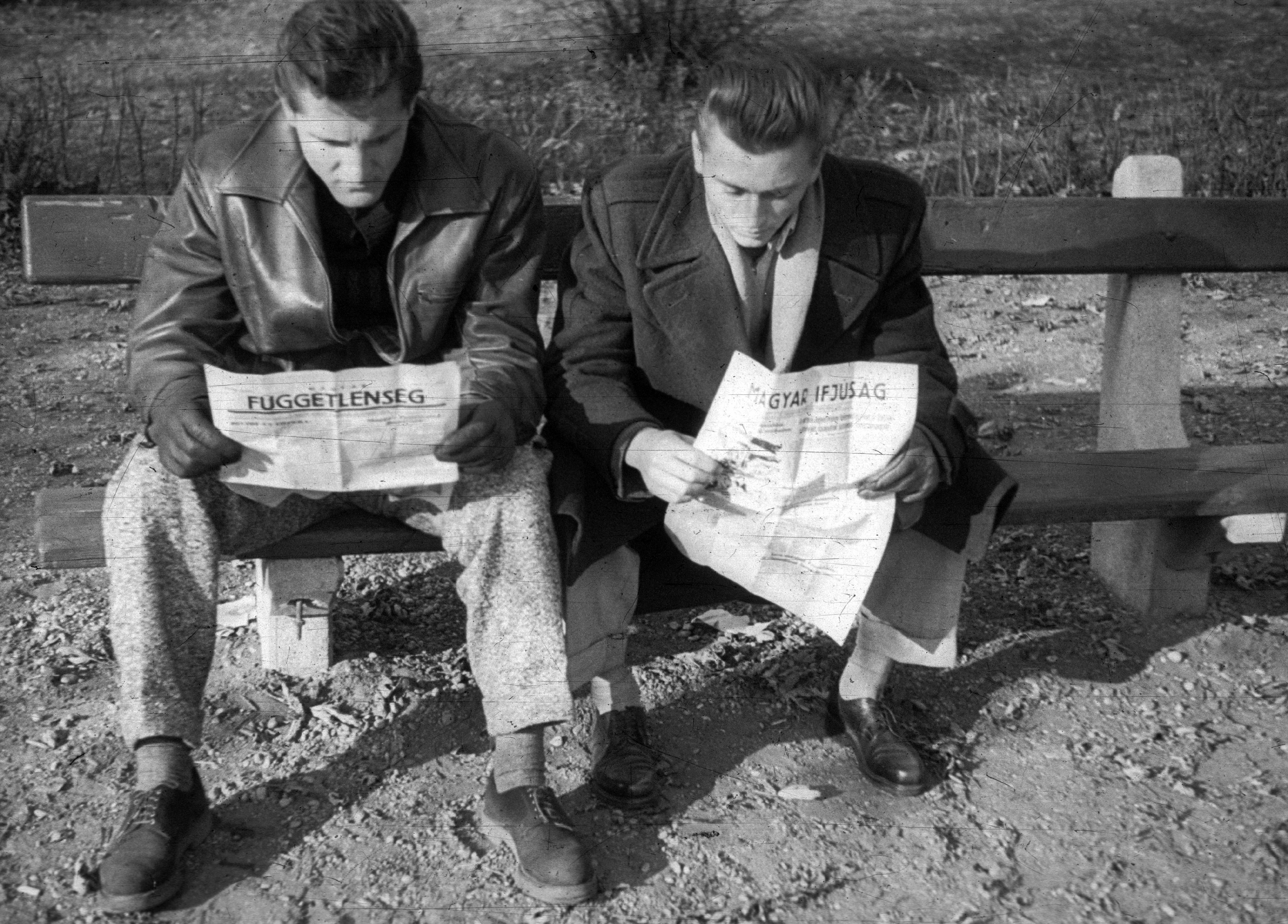
Man reading the Függetlenség during the Hungarian Revolution of 1956 (left)

Függetlenség (Hungarian pronunciation: [ˈfyɡːɛtlɛnʃeːɡ], lit. Independence) was a Hungarian language daily newspaper. It was founded in 1906, with the purpose of serving as the information source for the Magyars and Hungarian language-speaking population in Bács-Bodrog County within the Kingdom of Hungary in Austria-Hungary. It was published in Subotica (Today in Serbia) as the organ of Independence Party. It was the journal of Simon Mukits and Jákó Fischer. Függetlenség was published until 1908. Függetlenség reappeared in 1910 and finally was disestablished in 1913.

== See also ==
- Hungarians in Vojvodina
