= Lukas Stagge =

German footballer

Personal information
- Date of birth: 11 May 1997 (age 29)
- Place of birth: Quedlinburg, Germany
- Height: 1.84 m (6 ft 0 in)
- Position: Forward

Team information
- Current team: SV Tasmania Berlin
- Number: 24

Youth career
- –2010: SV Germania Gernrode
- 2010–2016: Hallescher FC

Senior career*
Years	Team	Apps	(Gls)
2016–2017	Hallescher FC	3	(0)
2016–2017	→ SV Merseburg 99 (loan)	23	(7)
2017–2022	Union Fürstenwalde	124	(20)
2022–2024	Chemnitzer FC	52	(5)
2024–2025	TuS Makkabi Berlin	24	(2)
2025–	SV Tasmania Berlin	16	(2)
- * Club domestic league appearances and goals as of 30 June 2026

Lukas Stagge (born 11 May 1997) is a German footballer who plays as a forward for SV Tasmania Berlin.

== Career ==
Stagge made his professional debut for Hallescher FC in the 3. Liga on 24 January 2016, coming on as a substitute in the 82nd minute for Ivica Banović in the 1–2 home loss against 1. FC Magdeburg.
