= Bácskai Hírlap =

Bácskai Hírlap (lit. Bachkan Newspapers) was a Hungarian language daily newspaper. The first issue of Bácskai Hírlap was published on 3 October 1897 with the purpose of serving as the information source for the Magyars and Hungarian language-speaking population in Bács-Bodrog County within the Kingdom of Hungary in Austria-Hungary and later in the Kingdom of Serbs, Croats and Slovenes. It was published in Subotica (Today in Serbia). Bácskai Hírlap was originally social, economic, political and literary newspaper. Later it shifted to political newspaper on 6 April 1902 until 1909. After that it became the organ of Bács-Bodrog County branch of Independence Party. Bácskai Hírlap was banned in 1919. It reappeared as Magyar Újság and in 1921 under the old name. Its editors-in-chief were from 1901 Károly Csillag, Henrik Braun, Emil Havas, Henrik Braun from 1909, and Emil Havas again in 1917. Bácskai Hírlap was disestablished in 1921.

== See also ==
- Hungarians in Vojvodina

== External references ==
- (Hungarian) Kosztolányi Dezső emlékoldal - Bácskai lapok.1 Sajtótörténeti háttér a Forrásjegyzék 2. kötetéhez
- (Hungarian) Születésnapi Újság, születésnapi újságok, régi újság minta ajándék ...
- (Hungarian) Szabadka városfejlődése 1700 és 1910 között
- (Hungarian) LÉTÜNK - TÁRSADALOM, TUDOMÁNY, KULTÚRA, 2002.1-2
