= 1998–99 NOFV-Oberliga =

NOFV-Oberliga
- Season: 1998–99
- Champions: Hertha BSC (A), VfL Halle 1896
- Promoted: Hertha BSC (A), Tennis Borussia Berlin (A), VfL Halle 1896
- Relegated: SCC Berlin, SV Tasmania 73 Neukölln, FC Carl Zeiss Jena (A), 1. FC Aschersleben

The 1998–99 season of the NOFV-Oberliga was the fifth season of the league at tier four (IV) of the German football league system.

The NOFV-Oberliga was split into two divisions, NOFV-Oberliga Nord and NOFV-Oberliga Süd. The champions of each, Hertha BSC (A) and VfL Halle 1896, as well as Tennis Borussia Berlin (A), were directly promoted to the 1999–2000 Regionalliga Nordost.

== North ==
| Pos | Team | Pld | W | D | L | GF | GA | GD | Pts | Promotion or relegation |
|---|---|---|---|---|---|---|---|---|---|---|
| 1 | Hertha BSC (A) (C, P) | 30 | 21 | 3 | 6 | 89 | 32 | +57 | 66 | Promotion to Regionalliga Nordost |
| 2 | Tennis Borussia Berlin (A) (P) | 30 | 18 | 6 | 6 | 65 | 33 | +32 | 60 | Promotion to Regionalliga Nordost |
| 3 | F.C. Hansa Rostock (A) | 30 | 17 | 6 | 7 | 52 | 32 | +20 | 57 | |
| 4 | FC Eintracht Schwerin | 30 | 17 | 5 | 8 | 59 | 39 | +20 | 56 | |
| 5 | Frankfurter FC Viktoria | 30 | 14 | 8 | 8 | 45 | 32 | +13 | 50 | |
| 6 | Greifswalder SC | 30 | 12 | 9 | 9 | 53 | 46 | +7 | 45 | |
| 7 | Reinickendorfer Füchse | 30 | 12 | 5 | 13 | 43 | 40 | +3 | 41 | |
| 8 | FC Schönberg 95 | 30 | 11 | 7 | 12 | 42 | 42 | 0 | 40 | |
| 9 | Hertha Zehlendorf | 30 | 11 | 7 | 12 | 45 | 52 | −7 | 40 | |
| 10 | Köpenicker SC | 30 | 9 | 11 | 10 | 59 | 52 | +7 | 38 | |
| 11 | VfB Lichterfelde | 30 | 10 | 8 | 12 | 40 | 49 | −9 | 38 | |
| 12 | FV Motor Eberswalde | 30 | 11 | 5 | 14 | 33 | 43 | −10 | 38 | |
| 13 | FSV Optik Rathenow | 30 | 8 | 12 | 10 | 35 | 51 | −16 | 36 | |
| 14 | TSG Neustrelitz | 30 | 8 | 7 | 15 | 37 | 62 | −25 | 31 | |
| 15 | SCC Berlin (R) | 30 | 5 | 5 | 20 | 29 | 61 | −32 | 20 | Relegation to Verbandsliga |
| 16 | SV Tasmania 73 Neukölln (R) | 30 | 3 | 2 | 25 | 19 | 79 | −60 | 11 | Relegation to Verbandsliga |

Source: fussballdaten.de
Rules for classification: 1) points; 2) goal difference; 3) number of goals scored.
(C) Champions; (P) Promoted; (R) Relegated

== South ==
| Pos | Team | Pld | W | D | L | GF | GA | GD | Pts | Promotion or relegation |
|---|---|---|---|---|---|---|---|---|---|---|
| 1 | VfL Halle 1896 (C, P) | 30 | 24 | 1 | 5 | 74 | 27 | +47 | 73 | Promotion to Regionalliga Nordost |
| 2 | VfB Leipzig (A) | 30 | 19 | 6 | 5 | 52 | 23 | +29 | 63 | |
| 3 | FSV Hoyerswerda | 30 | 14 | 11 | 5 | 43 | 20 | +23 | 53 | |
| 4 | FC Energie Cottbus (A) | 30 | 14 | 9 | 7 | 54 | 37 | +17 | 51 | |
| 5 | Bischofswerdaer FV 08 | 30 | 15 | 5 | 10 | 41 | 29 | +12 | 50 | |
| 6 | FSV Wacker 90 Nordhausen | 30 | 14 | 6 | 10 | 57 | 42 | +15 | 48 | |
| 7 | SV 1919 Grimma | 30 | 15 | 3 | 12 | 41 | 32 | +9 | 48 | |
| 8 | FV Dresden-Nord | 30 | 9 | 10 | 11 | 36 | 39 | −3 | 37 | |
| 9 | 1. Suhler SV | 30 | 10 | 7 | 13 | 30 | 42 | −12 | 37 | |
| 10 | Bornaer SV | 30 | 7 | 15 | 8 | 30 | 32 | −2 | 36 | |
| 11 | SV Fortuna Magdeburg | 30 | 10 | 5 | 15 | 30 | 46 | −16 | 35 | |
| 12 | SSV Erfurt-Nord | 30 | 10 | 5 | 15 | 35 | 54 | −19 | 35 | |
| 13 | SV Schott Jena | 30 | 9 | 5 | 16 | 36 | 55 | −19 | 32 | |
| 14 | VfB Chemnitz | 30 | 6 | 8 | 16 | 33 | 48 | −15 | 26 | |
| 15 | FC Carl Zeiss Jena (A) (R) | 30 | 6 | 7 | 17 | 38 | 60 | −22 | 25 | Relegation to Verbandsligas/Landesligas |
| 16 | 1. FC Aschersleben (R) | 30 | 5 | 3 | 22 | 22 | 66 | −44 | 18 | Relegation to Verbandsligas/Landesligas |

Source: fussballdaten.de
Rules for classification: 1) points; 2) goal difference; 3) number of goals scored.
(C) Champions; (P) Promoted; (R) Relegated
