= 1997–98 NOFV-Oberliga =

NOFV-Oberliga
- Season: 1997–98
- Champions: SD Croatia Berlin, Dresdner SC
- Promoted: SD Croatia Berlin, Dresdner SC
- Relegated: Türkiyemspor Berlin, SG Bornim, Parchimer FC, FSV Velten, Hallescher FC, FV Zeulenroda, SV 1910 Kahla, FC Anhalt Dessau

The 1997–98 season of the NOFV-Oberliga was the fourth season of the league at tier four (IV) of the German football league system.

The NOFV-Oberliga was split into two divisions, NOFV-Oberliga Nord and NOFV-Oberliga Süd. The champions of each, SD Croatia Berlin and Dresdner SC, were directly promoted to the 1998–99 Regionalliga Nordost.

FSV Velten withdrew from the league soon after the season began.

== North ==
Pos	Team	Pld	W	D	L	GF	GA	GD	Pts	Promotion or relegation
1	SD Croatia Berlin (C, P)	28	19	5	4	50	16	+34	62	Promotion to Regionalliga Nordost
2	Hertha BSC (A)	28	15	5	8	62	31	+31	50	
3	Greifswalder SC	28	15	4	9	58	38	+20	49	
4	FC Eintracht Schwerin	28	13	7	8	57	39	+18	46	
5	Frankfurter FC Viktoria	28	14	4	10	40	33	+7	46	
6	SV Tasmania 73 Neukölln	28	12	6	10	48	44	+4	42	
7	FV Motor Eberswalde	28	11	7	10	34	39	−5	40	
8	VfB Lichterfelde	28	10	8	10	43	43	0	38	
9	Köpenicker SC	28	11	5	12	36	37	−1	38	
10	SCC Berlin	28	10	8	10	39	47	−8	38	
11	TSG Neustrelitz	28	9	7	12	44	62	−18	34	
12	FSV Optik Rathenow	28	8	7	13	37	49	−12	31	
13	Türkiyemspor Berlin (R)	28	7	9	12	28	32	−4	30	Relegation to Verbandsligas
14	SG Bornim (R)	28	6	5	17	23	55	−32	23	Relegation to Verbandsligas
15	Parchimer FC (R)	28	4	5	19	20	54	−34	17	Relegation to Verbandsligas
16	FSV Velten (R)	0	0	0	0	0	0	0	0	Withdrew

Source: fussballdaten.de
Rules for classification: 1) points; 2) goal difference; 3) number of goals scored.
(C) Champions; (P) Promoted; (R) Relegated

== South ==
Pos	Team	Pld	W	D	L	GF	GA	GD	Pts	Promotion or relegation
1	Dresdner SC (C, P)	30	20	4	6	61	21	+40	64	Promotion to Regionalliga Nordost
2	SV Fortuna Magdeburg	30	19	5	6	58	22	+36	62	
3	VfL Halle 1896	30	17	8	5	46	23	+23	59	
4	Bischofswerdaer FV 08	30	16	5	9	50	30	+20	53	
5	FV Dresden-Nord	30	15	5	10	41	31	+10	50	
6	FC Carl Zeiss Jena (A)	30	14	5	11	48	37	+11	47	
7	1. Suhler SV	30	12	10	8	47	35	+12	46	
8	VfB Chemnitz	30	10	8	12	30	33	−3	38	
9	Bornaer SV	30	10	7	13	34	45	−11	37	
10	FSV Hoyerswerda	30	9	9	12	29	36	−7	36	
11	SV 1919 Grimma	30	10	5	15	47	71	−24	35	
12	SV Schott Jena	30	7	10	13	31	48	−17	31	
13	Hallescher FC (R)	30	6	12	12	39	47	−8	30	Relegation to Verbandsligas/Landesligas
14	FV Zeulenroda (R)	30	6	11	13	33	55	−22	29	Relegation to Verbandsligas/Landesligas
15	SV 1910 Kahla (R)	30	7	7	16	29	47	−18	28	Relegation to Verbandsligas/Landesligas
16	FC Anhalt Dessau (R)	30	4	5	21	27	69	−42	17	Relegation to Verbandsligas/Landesligas

Source: fussballdaten.de
Rules for classification: 1) points; 2) goal difference; 3) number of goals scored.
(C) Champions; (P) Promoted; (R) Relegated
