= 1998–99 Hertha BSC season =

Hertha BSC
1998–99 season
- Manager: Jürgen Röber
- Bundesliga: 3rd
- DFB Cup: Third Round
- Top goalscorer: League: Michael Preetz (23 goals); All: Michael Preetz (23 goals)
Home colours	Away colours	Third colours

The 1998–99 Hertha BSC season started on 16 August 1998 against Werder Bremen and ended on 29 May 1999.

== Results ==
=== Legend ===
Win Draw Loss

=== Bundesliga ===
Match	Date	Time	Venue	City	Opponent	Result	Attendance	Hertha BSC goalscorers	Source
1	16 August 1998	18:00	Olympiastadion	Berlin	Werder Bremen	1–0	62,982	Preetz 54'	
2	22 August 1998	15:30	Westfalenstadion	Dortmund	Borussia Dortmund	0–3	65,000	—	
3	9 September 1998	20:00	Olympiastadion	Berlin	Schalke 04	2–0	47,887	Rekdal 65' pen., Tretschok 75'	
4	12 September 1998	15:30	Fritz-Walter-Stadion	Kaiserslautern	1. FC Kaiserslautern	3–4	39,800	Veit 1', Thom 45', Dárdai 54'	
5	18 September 1998	20:00	Olympiastadion	Berlin	Eintracht Frankfurt	3–1	44,901	Preetz 27', 55', Tchami 81'	
6	25 September 1998	20:00	Olympiastadion	Munich	TSV 1860 München	0–2	32,000	—	
7	2 October 1998	20:00	Olympiastadion	Berlin	Borussia Mönchengladbach	4–1	40,493	Veit 12', Preetz 58', 81', 88'	
8	17 October 1998	15:30	Gottlieb-Daimler-Stadion	Stuttgart	VfB Stuttgart	0–0	31,000	—	
9	25 October 1998	18:00	Wedaustadion	Duisburg	MSV Duisburg	0–0	13,430	—	
10	1 November 1998	18:00	Olympiastadion	Berlin	1. FC Nürnberg	3–0	31,493	Mandreko 9', Veit 17', Tchami 44'	
11	7 November 1998	15:30	Ruhrstadion	Bochum	VfL Bochum	0–2	21,016	—	
12	11 November 1998	20:00	Olympiastadion	Berlin	Bayer Leverkusen	0–1	32,655	—	
13	14 November 1998	15:30	VfL-Stadion am Elsterweg	Wolfsburg	VfL Wolfsburg	1–2	17,469	Tretschok 5'	
14	21 November 1998	15:30	Olympiastadion	Berlin	Bayern Munich	1–0	76,000	Preetz 68'	
15	27 November 1998	20:00	Ostseestadion	Rostock	Hansa Rostock	2–1	14,000	Veit 51', Preetz 55'	
17	11 December 1998	20:00	Volksparkstadion	Hamburg	Hamburger SV	4–0	20,118	Reiss 22', Wosz 50', Tretschok 79', Preetz 84'	
16	15 December 1998	20:00	Olympiastadion	Berlin	SC Freiburg	1–0	34,037	Preetz 27'	
18	20 December 1998	18:00	Weserstadion	Bremen	Werder Bremen	1–2	28,400	Preetz 46'	
19	20 February 1999	15:30	Olympiastadion	Berlin	Borussia Dortmund	3–0	68,419	Aračić 70', 82', Preetz 83'	
20	28 February 1999	18:00	Parkstadion	Gelsenkirchen	Schalke 04	0–0	41,100	—	
21	6 March 1999	15:30	Olympiastadion	Berlin	1. FC Kaiserslautern	1–1	54,433	Preetz 79'	
22	14 March 1999	18:00	Waldstadion	Frankfurt am Main	Eintracht Frankfurt	1–1	26,000	Sverrisson 59'	
23	20 March 1999	15:30	Olympiastadion	Berlin	TSV 1860 München	2–1	48,364	Preetz 10' pen.,Tretschok 79'	
24	4 April 1999	18:00	Bökelbergstadion	Mönchengladbach	Borussia Mönchengladbach	4–2	31,000	Preetz 34', 71' pen., Thom 66', Sverrisson 77'	
25	10 April 1999	15:30	Olympiastadion	Berlin	VfB Stuttgart	2–0	57,849	Aračić 57', Neuendorf 73'	
26	14 April 1999	20:00	Olympiastadion	Berlin	MSV Duisburg	1–3	40,242	Preetz 70'	
27	17 April 1999	15:30	Frankenstadion	Nuremberg	1. FC Nürnberg	0–0	33,000	—	
28	24 April 1999	15:30	Olympiastadion	Berlin	VfL Bochum	4–1	45,646	Wosz 14', 80', Herzog 18', Hartmann 37'	
29	1 May 1999	15:30	BayArena	Leverkusen	Bayer Leverkusen	2–2	22,500	Nowotny 25' o.g., Herzog 52'	
30	5 May 1999	20:00	Olympiastadion	Berlin	VfL Wolfsburg	2–0	54,444	Preetz 32', 74'	
31	9 May 1999	18:00	Olympiastadion	Munich	Bayern Munich	1–1	63,000	Schmidt 72'	
32	14 May 1999	20:00	Olympiastadion	Berlin	Hansa Rostock	2–0	76,000	Neuendorf 75', Hartmann 83'	
33	22 May 1999	15:30	Dreisamstadion	Freiburg	SC Freiburg	2–0	22,500	Preetz 27', Aračić 70'	
34	29 May 1999	15:30	Olympiastadion	Berlin	Hamburger SV	6–1	76,000	Preetz 6', 51' pen., 86', Aračić 55', Neuendorf 69', Thom 75'	

=== DFB-Pokal ===
Round	Date	Time	Venue	City	Opponent	Result	Attendance	Hertha BSC goalscorers	Source
1	30 August 1998	14:30	Sportpark am Kaulbachweg	Regensburg	Post/Süd Regensburg	2–0	4,500	Sverrisson 36', Tretschok 56'	
2	22 September 1998	19:30	Ulrich-Haberland-Stadion	Leverkusen	Bayer Leverkusen	1–1 (a.e.t.)	16,000	Preetz 24'	
Round of 16	28 October 1998	19:30	Olympic Stadium	Berlin	Tennis Borussia Berlin	2–4	40,122	Thom 12', Tchami 68'	

== Roster and statistics ==
As of 26 August 2012

No.	Pos	Nat	Player	Total		Bundesliga		DFB-Pokal	
No.	Pos	Nat	Player	Apps	Goals	Apps	Goals	Apps	Goals
	GK	(Hungary) HUN	Gabor Király	37	0	34	0	3	0
	DF	(Germany) GER	Michael Hartmann	27	2	27	2	0	0
	DF	(Germany) GER	Hendrik Herzog	26	2	26	2	0	0
	DF	(Norway) NOR	Kjetil-André Rekdal	27	1	24	1	3	0
	DF	(Ghana) GHA	Christian Saba	1	0	1	0	0	0
	DF	(United States) USA	Tony Sanneh	5	0	5	0	0	0
	DF	(Netherlands) NED	Dick van Burik	0	0	0	0	0	0
				0	0	0	0	0	0
				0	0	0	0	0	0
				0	0	0	0	0	0
				0	0	0	0	0	0
				0	0	0	0	0	0
				0	0	0	0	0	0
				0	0	0	0	0	0
				0	0	0	0	0	0
				0	0	0	0	0	0
				0	0	0	0	0	0
				0	0	0	0	0	0
				0	0	0	0	0	0
				0	0	0	0	0	0
				0	0	0	0	0	0
				0	0	0	0	0	0
				0	0	0	0	0	0
				0	0	0	0	0	0
				0	0	0	0	0	0
