= Abdulkadir Beyazıt =

German footballer

Personal information
- Date of birth: 4 November 1996 (age 29)
- Place of birth: Berlin, Germany
- Height: 1.83 m (6 ft 0 in)
- Position: Forward

Team information
- Current team: SV Tasmania Berlin
- Number: 11

Youth career
- Türkiyemspor Berlin
- –2012: Hertha Zehlendorf
- 2012–2013: Tennis Borussia Berlin
- 2013–2014: Union Berlin
- 2014–2015: Viktoria Berlin

Senior career*
Years	Team	Apps	(Gls)
2015–2016	Viktoria Berlin	21	(1)
2015–2016	Viktoria Berlin II	6	(5)
2016–2018	SV Babelsberg	46	(15)
2018–2020	Energie Cottbus	23	(3)
2020–2021	Berliner AK	12	(7)
2021–2022	1461 Trabzon	13	(1)
2022	Somaspor	11	(1)
2022–2023	CFC Hertha 06	19	(5)
2023–2024	FSV Optik Rathenow	10	(1)
2024	Hertha Zehlendorf	29	(14)
2025	VSG Altglienicke	6	(1)
2025–2026	Berliner AK 07	28	(13)
2026–	SV Tasmania Berlin	10	(2)
- * Club domestic league appearances and goals as of 23 September 2026

Abdulkadir Beyazıt (born 4 November 1996) is a German footballer who plays as a forward for SV Tasmania Berlin.
