= 1. FC Aschersleben =

German football club

- Full name: 1. Fußball-Club Aschersleben e.V.
- Founded: 1993
- Dissolved: 2011
- Ground: Wilsberger Straße
- Capacity: 5,000
- League: defunct
Home colours	Away colours

1. FC Aschersleben was a German football club from the city of Aschersleben, Saxony-Anhalt. It was the successor to Motor Aschersleben which was part of second-tier competition in East Germany in the early 1960s.

== History ==
The club was established on 30 April 1951 as BSG Stahl Achersleben after World War II in the Soviet occupied eastern half of Germany. It became part of the separate East German football competition the emerged in the early 1950s. It was later known as BSG Motor Aschersleben and then BSG Motor Wema Aschersleben. From 1960 to 1963 Motor was part of the 2. Liga DDR, Staffel 3 and was sent down after finishing the 1962–63 season in 13th place. They took part in the opening rounds of the FDGB-Pokal (East German Cup) in 1962 and 1964. In 1990, following the reunification of Germany the club adopted the name Sportverein Arminia Aschersleben. On 1 July 1993, Arminia joined ESV Lok Aschersleben to create 1. FC Aschersleben.

Lok Aschersleben was a railway worker's side formed in 1945 as Sportgemeinde Aschersleben. The club played as BSG Reichsbahn Aschersleben in 1950–51, before adopting the name BSG Lok Aschersleben. Following the reunification of the country the club was known as ESV Lok Aschersleben.

After the merger that created 1. FC the team won its way to the Oberliga Nordost-Süd (IV) for the 1994–95 season. They made another single season appearance in Oberliga play in 1998–99.

In 2011 the club filed for bankruptcy and folded.
