= Sixten Veit =

German footballer

Personal information
- Date of birth: 7 January 1970 (age 56)
- Place of birth: Freiburg, West Germany
- Height: 1.85 m (6 ft 1 in)
- Position: Midfielder

Youth career
- 1978–: Traktor Oberbobritzsch
- –1982: Geologie Freiberg
- 1982–1989: FC Karl-Marx-Stadt

Senior career*
Years	Team	Apps	(Gls)
1989	ASG Vorwärts Leipzig		
1990	Aufbau dkk Krumhermersdorf		
1991–1995	Chemnitzer FC	89	(16)
1995–2001	Hertha BSC	113	(9)
2001	Beşiktaş	4	(0)
2002–2003	Union Berlin	19	(1)
2003–2004	Hallescher FC		
- * Club domestic league appearances and goals

Sixten Veit (born 7 January 1970) is a German former professional footballer who played as a midfielder. He made four appearances for Beşiktaş in the Turkish Süper Lig during 2001.

== Honours ==
Hertha BSC

- DFB-Ligapokal finalist: 2000
