= Orubica =

Coordinates: 45°08′N 17°27′E

- Village
- Interactive map of Orubica
- Country: Croatia
- Municipality: Davor

Area
  - Total: 8.0 sq mi (20.6 km^{2})

Population (2021)
  - Total: 504
  - Density: 63.4/sq mi (24.5/km^{2})
- Time zone: UTC+1 (CET)
  - Summer (DST): UTC+2 (CEST)

Orubica is a village in the municipality of Davor, Croatia.
