= Davor, Croatia =

- Interactive map of Davor, Croatia
- Coordinates: 45°07′N 17°31′E
- Country: Croatia
- County: Brod-Posavina County

Government
  - Mayor: Đuro Anđelković (HDZ)

Area
  - City: 42.7 km^{2} (16.5 sq mi)
  - Urban: 22.1 km^{2} (8.5 sq mi)

Population (2021)
  - City: 2,529
  - Density: 59.2/km^{2} (153/sq mi)
  - Urban: 2,025
  - Urban density: 91.6/km^{2} (237/sq mi)
- Postal code: 35400 Nova Gradiška
- Website: davor.hr

Davor is a village and a municipality in Brod-Posavina County. It is located about 40 km (25 mi) west of the city of Slavonski Brod, Croatia, on the left bank of the Sava river across Srbac. The village was called Svinjar before 1896.

== Demographics ==
In 2021, the municipality had 2,529 residents in the following settlements:

- Davor, population 2,025
- Orubica, population 504
Davor: Population trends 1857–2021
v

population	2854	2926	2550	2892	2938	3229	3052	3308	3778	3827	3641	3667	3526	3458	3259	3015	2529
	1857	1869	1880	1890	1900	1910	1921	1931	1948	1953	1961	1971	1981	1991	2001	2011	2021

Sources:Croatian Bureau of Statistics publications

The vast majority of residents are Croats (2011 census).

== Notable people ==
Notable people that were born or lived in Davor include:

- Ivica Olić (b. 14 September 1979), football player
- Matija Antun Relković (6 January 1732 – 22 January 1798), writer
- Antun Škvorčević (b. 8 May 1947), bishop
