= Bács-Bodrog County =

County of the Kingdom of Hungary

Bács-Bodrog County Comitatus Bacsiensis et Bodrogiensis (Latin) Bács-Bodrog vármegye (Hungarian) Komitat Batsch-Bodrog (German) Бачко-бодрошка жупанија (Serbian)
- County of the Kingdom of Hungary (1802-1849, 1860-1946); County of the Second Hungarian Republic (1946-1949); County of the Hungarian People's Republic (1949-1950)
- 1802–1 February 1950
- Coat of arms

- Capital: Zombor; Baja (1920-1941, 1945-1950)
- Area
  - 1910: 10,362 km^{2} (4,001 sq mi)
  - 1930: 1,685 km^{2} (651 sq mi)
- Population
  - 1910: 812,385
  - 1930: 137,403
- History
  - Established: 1802
  - Disestablished: 18 November 1849
  - County recreated: 27 December 1860
  - Treaty of Trianon: 4 June 1920
  - Recovery of the remaining parts of Bács-Bodrog County: 11 April 1941
  - Merged into Bács-Kiskun County: 1 February 1950
- Today part of: Serbia (8,677 km^{2}); Hungary (1,685 km^{2})
- Sombor is the current name of the capital.

Bács-Bodrog County (Hungarian: Bács-Bodrog vármegye, German: Komitat Batsch-Bodrog, Serbian: Бачко-бодрошка жупанија, romanized: Bačko-bodroška županija) was an administrative county (comitatus) of the Kingdom of Hungary from 1802 to 1920. Most of its territory is currently part of Serbia, while a smaller part belongs to Hungary. The capital of the county was Zombor (present-day Sombor).

== Name ==
The county was named after two older counties: Bács and Bodrog. Bács county was named after the town of Bács (present-day Bač) and Bodrog county was named after the historical town of Bodrog (which was located near present-day Bački Monoštor).

== Geography ==
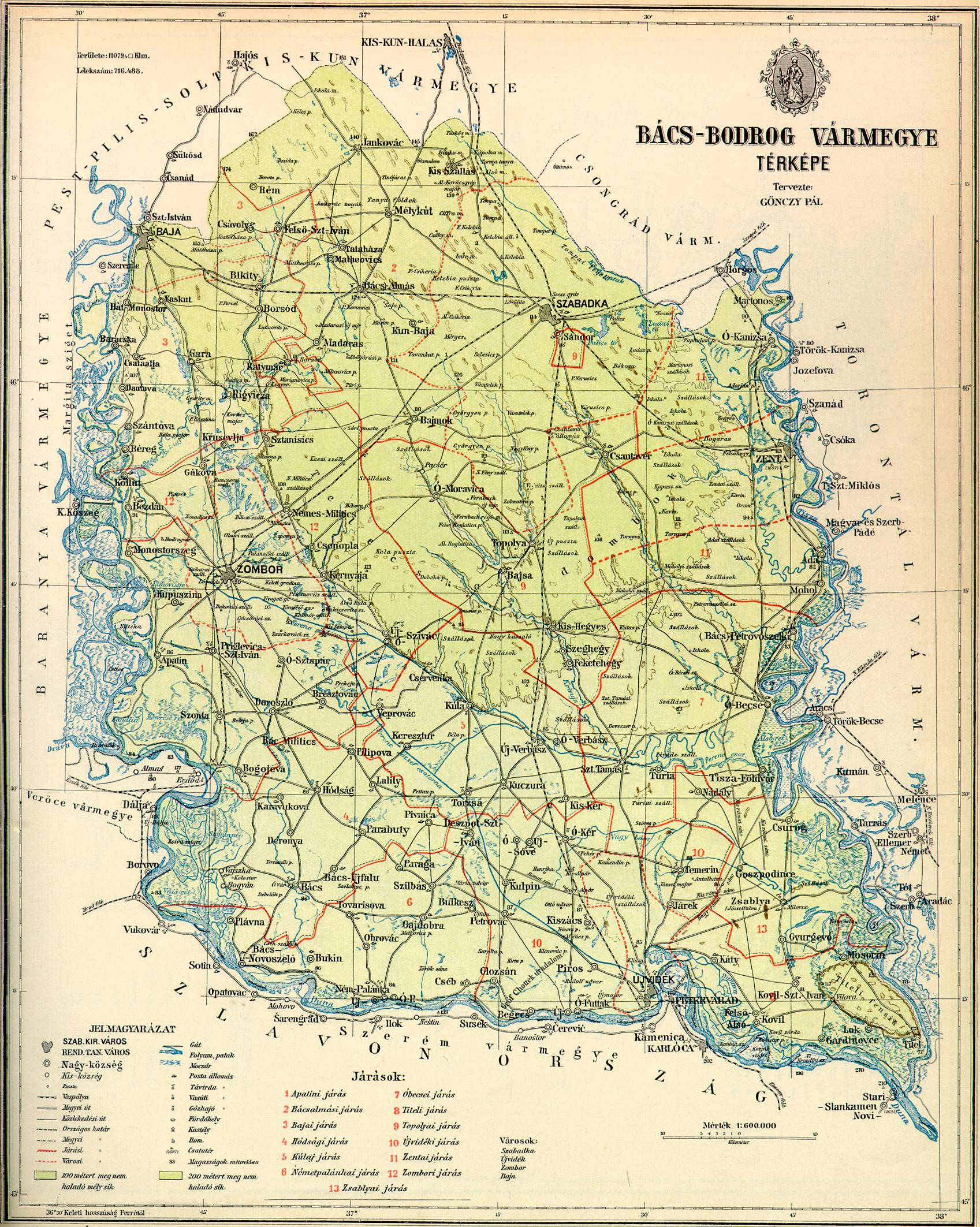
Map of Bács-Bodrog, 1891.

Bács-Bodrog county shared borders with several other counties of the Kingdom of Hungary: Baranya, Pest-Pilis-Solt-Kiskun, Csongrád, Torontál, Syrmia, and Virovitica (the latter two counties were part of the autonomous Kingdom of Croatia-Slavonia). The river Danube formed its western and southern border. The river Tisza formed its eastern border, down to its confluence with the Danube. Its area was 10,362 km^{2} (4,001 sq mi) around 1910.

== History ==
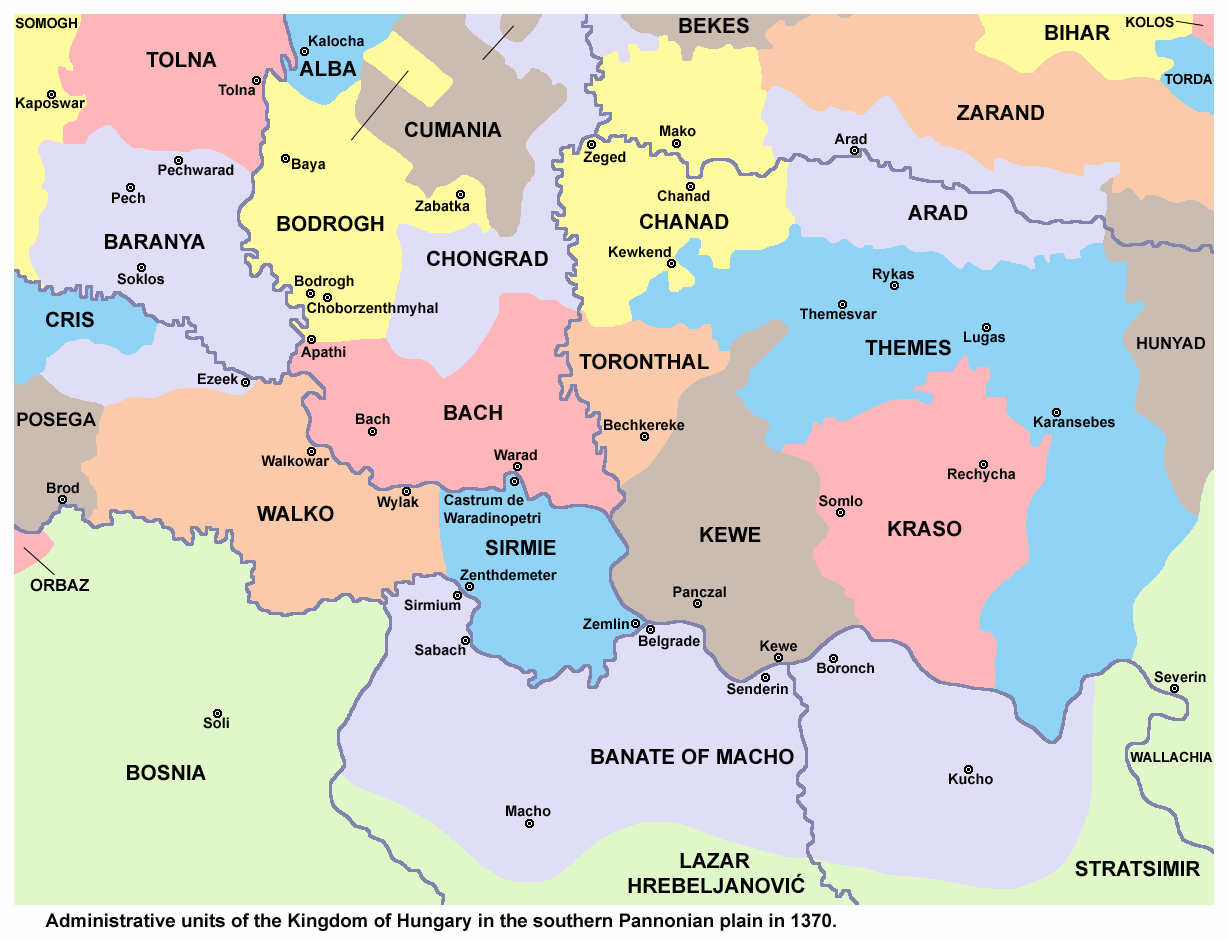
Bács and Bodrog counties in the 14th century.

Bács county arose as one of the first counties of the medieval Kingdom of Hungary, in the 11th century. Bodrog county was also formed in the 11th century. The area was taken by the Ottoman Empire in the 16th century and the two counties were abolished. During the Ottoman administration, the area of the former counties was part of the Sanjak of Segedin. The Bács and Bodrog counties were established again after the Bácska region was captured by the Habsburg monarchy in 1699; later, the two counties were joined into a single county in 1802. Some (mostly eastern) parts of Bácska were incorporated into the Theiß-Marosch section of the Military Frontier. After this part of the Military Frontier was abolished in 1751, these parts of the Batschka were also included into Bács-Bodrog county. The only part of the Batschka region which remained within the Military Frontier was Šajkaška, but it too came under civil administration in 1873.

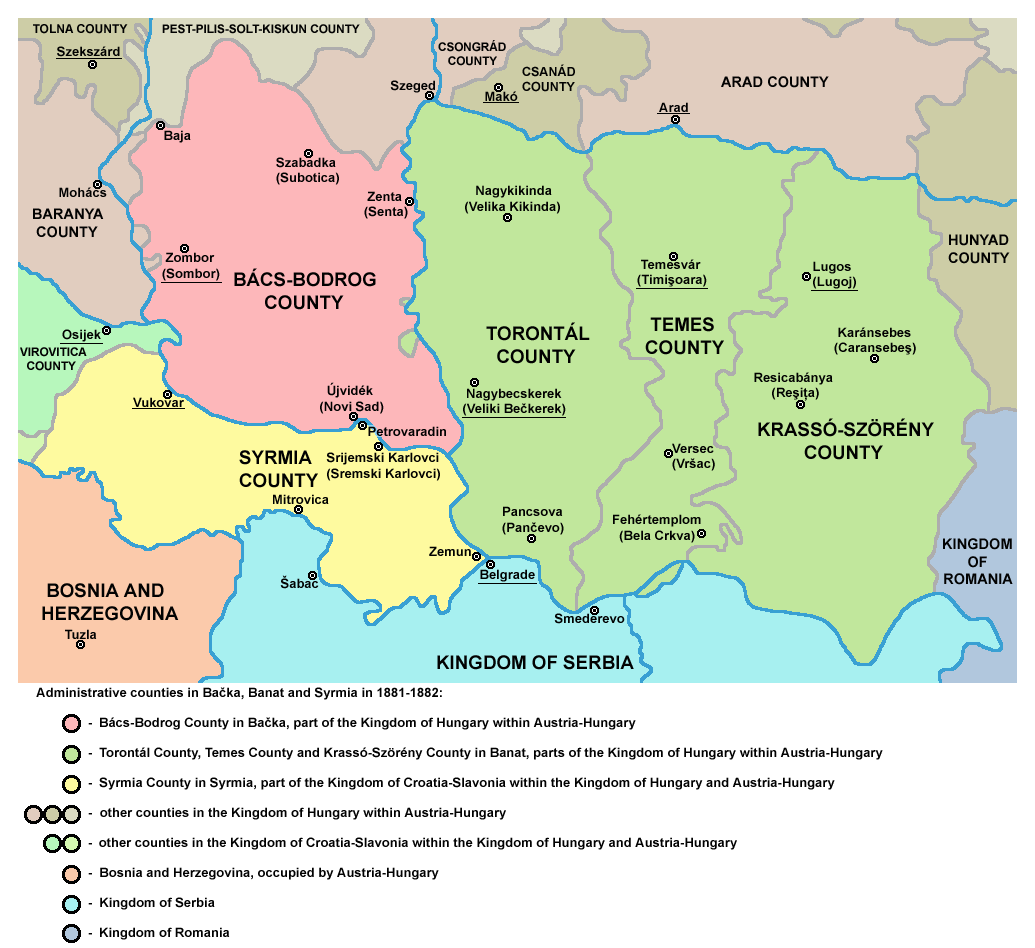
Bács-Bodrog, Syrmia, Torontál, Temes and Krassó-Szöreny counties after 1881, the five counties, which were formed in the territory of former Voivodeship of Serbia and Banat of Temeschwar.

In 1848/1849, the area of the county was claimed by the self-proclaimed Serbian Voivodeship, while between 1849 and 1860 it was part of the Voivodeship of Serbia and Temes Banat, an official crown land of the Empire. During this time the county did not exist since the area was divided into districts. The county was recreated in 1860, when the Voivodeship of Serbia and Banat of Temeschwar was abolished and the area was again incorporated into the Habsburg Kingdom of Hungary.

Under the Austro-Hungarian Compromise of 1867, Hungarian government gained full powers in all internal affairs, including the governance of counties, that also included the Bács-Bodrog county, as part of the Kingdom of Hungary (1867-1918).

=== Division ===
In 1918, under the Armistice of Belgrade (13 November), armed forces of Austria-Hungary retreated from the territory of Bács-Bodrog county, and the region was possessed by the Allied Army of the Orient, thus allowing the Royal Serbian Army to establish effective control south of the Baja-Szeged line.

By that time, the process of political dissolution of Austria-Hungary was already initiated, and on 16 November the First Hungarian Republic was proclaimed. In order to secure incorporation of those regions, local Serbian and other Slavic leaders organized a political assembly, that was held on 25 November in Novi Sad, and proclaimed the unification of several regions, including the Bács-Bodrog county, into the Kingdom of Serbia. Several days later, on 1 December 1918, the Kingdom of Serbs, Croats and Slovenes was proclaimed, encompassing Serbia with Montenegro, and South Slavic provinces of the former Austria-Hungary. Thus, two countries laid clai ms on the Bács-Bodrog county, the Hungarian Republic and the Yugoslav Kingdom.

By the Treaty of Trianon of 1920, the territory of the county was divided between the Kingdom of Serbs, Croats and Slovenes and Hungary. Most of the county (including Sombor, Subotica, and Novi Sad) was assigned to the Kingdom of Serbs, Croats and Slovenes (renamed to Yugoslavia in 1929), while the northernmost part (approximately 15% of the county), including town of Baja, was assigned to Hungary.

Thus, the county was divided in two separate counties, both keeping the same name: southern part (centered in Sombor) became the Bács-Bodrog county in the Kingdom of Serbs, Croats and Slovenes (Yugoslavia), while northern part (centered in Baja) became the Bács-Bodrog county in the recreated Kingdom of Hungary.

=== Yugoslav Bács-Bodrog County ===
Yugoslav part of the Bács-Bodrog County was enlarged in 1923 by adding two districts in southern (Yugoslav) part of Baranya region. County administration (centered in Sombor) continued to function until 1927, when administrative reforms, based on new districts (oblasts) were finally implemented. As planned since 1922, the county was thus divided between the Belgrade Oblast, and the Bačka Oblast (centered in Novi Sad).

=== Hungarian Bács-Bodrog County ===
The administration of the remaining Hungarian Bács-Bodrog County was centered in Baja, and it continued to exist until 1950. In 1941, during the World War II, Yugoslav part of the pre-1920 Bács-Bodrog county was occupied and annexed by Hungary, and Bács-Bodrog county was extended to its historic boundaries. After World War II, the border between Yugoslavia and Hungary was restored in 1945, and confirmed by the Paris Peace Treaties (1947), thus reducing county's territory again. In 1950, Hungarian Bács-Bodrog was united with the southern part of the former Pest-Pilis-Solt-Kiskun county to form the Bács-Kiskun County.

== Demographics ==
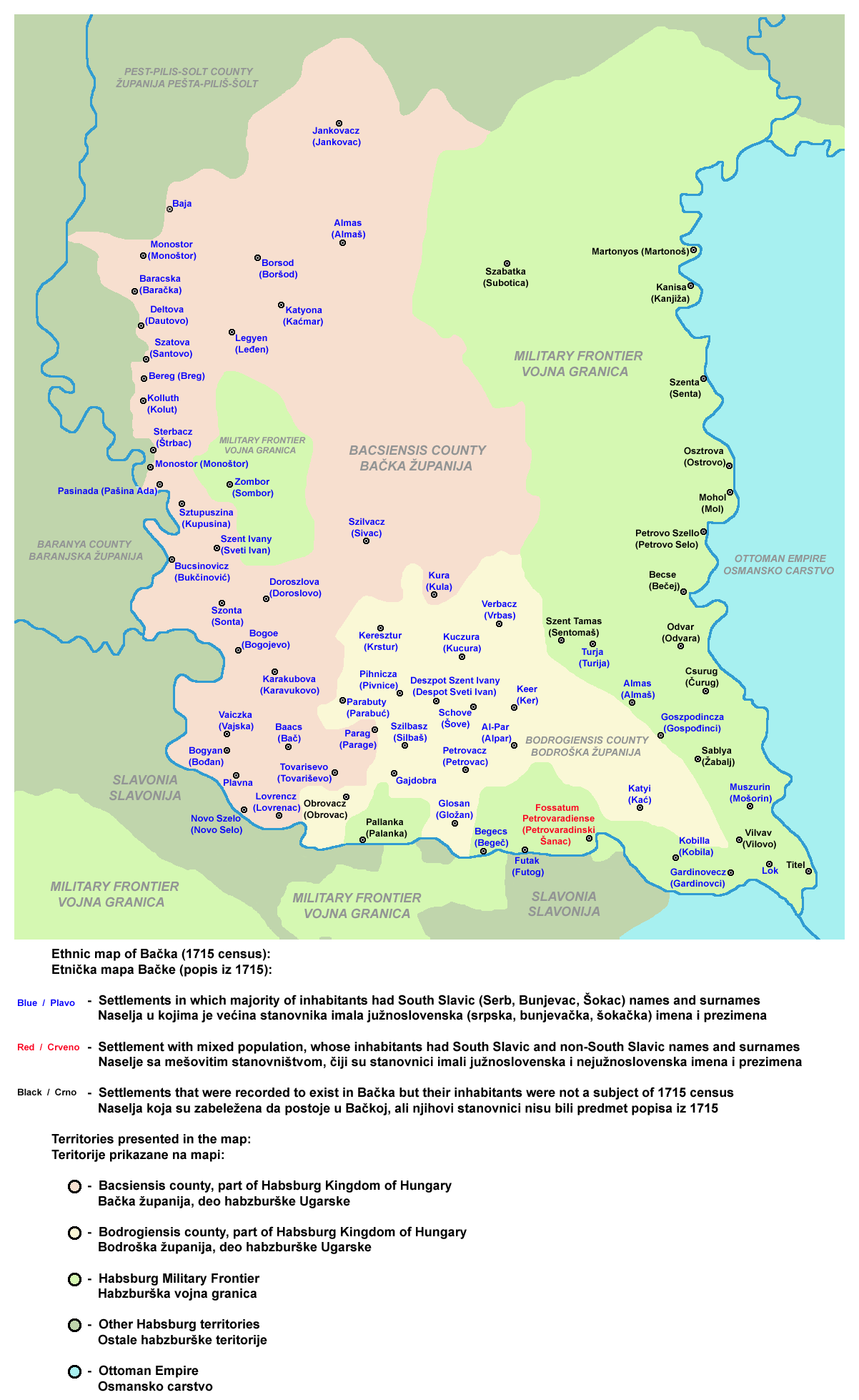
Ethnic map and political division of the area in 1715

During the 18th century, the Habsburgs carried out an intensive colonisation of the area, which had low population density after the last Ottoman wars. The new settlers were primarily Serbs, Hungarians, and Germans. Because many of the Germans came from Swabia, they were known as Donauschwaben, or Danube Swabians. Some Germans also came from Austria, and some from Bavaria and Alsace. Lutheran Slovaks, Rusyns, and others were also colonized, but to a much smaller extent. According to the Austrian census from 1715, Serbs, Bunjevci, and Šokci comprised 97.6% of the county's population.

The 1720 census recorded 104,569 citizens in the county. Of those, there were 98,000 Serbs (divided into 76,000 Orthodox and 22,000 Roman Catholics, or Bunjevci and Šokci), 5,019 Magyars and 750 Germans. The Serbs (73%) and Bunjevci and Šokci (21%) had an overwhelming majority in the county at that time.

There was also an emigration of Serbs from the eastern parts of the region, which belonged to Military Frontier until 1751. After the abolishment of the Theiß-Maros section of Military Frontier, many Serbs emigrated from north-eastern parts of Batschka. They moved either to Russia (notably to New Serbia and Slavo-Serbia) or to Banat, where the Military Frontier was still in place.

By 1820, the county had grown to 387,914 in total population. The Serb (including Croats, Bunjevci and Šokci) share had dropped to 44% or 170,942, with the number of Hungarians rising to 121,688 and Germans to 91,016, or 31% and 23%, respectively.

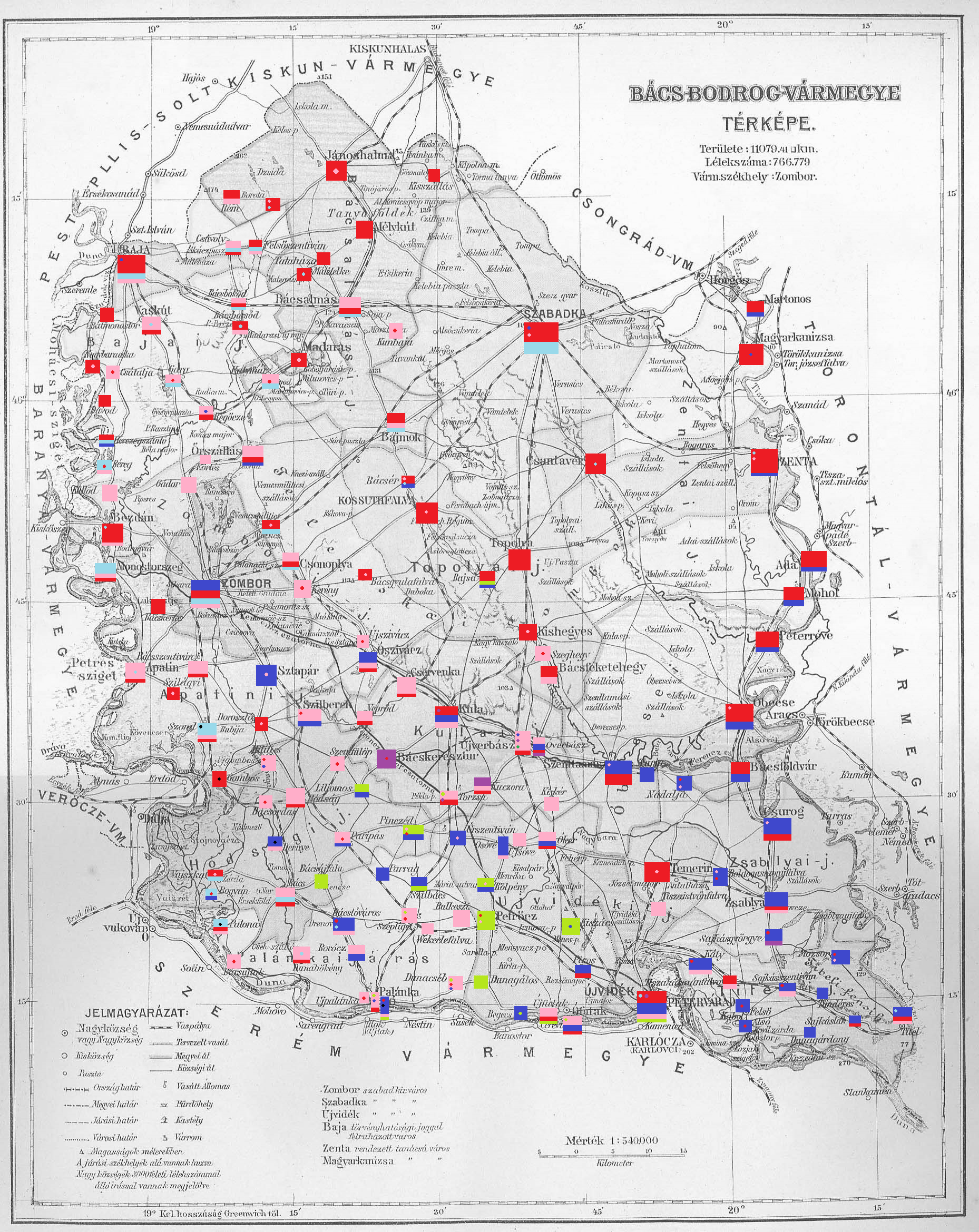
Ethnic map of the county (with data of the 1910 census). Key: red - Hungarians; pink - Germans; light green - Slovaks; light blue - Croatians; dark blue - Serbs; violet - Ruthenians; black - Roma. Coloured dots in plain rectangles imply the presence of smaller minority populations (generally more than 100 people or 10%). Multicoloured rectangles imply cities and villages with multi-ethnic populations with the order of the stripes following the ethnic composition of the settlement.

Population by mother tongue (Note: Only linguistic communities > 1% are displayed.)
Census	Total	Hungarian	German	Serbian	Slovak	Ruthenian	Other or unknown
1880	638,063	234,352 (38.52%)	162,894 (26.77%)	177,081 (29.10%) (Note: Serbian and Croatian.)	24,761 (4.07%)	7,294 (1.20%)	2,062 (0.34%)
1890	716,488	288,521 (40.27%)	189,051 (26.39%)	197,104 (27.51%)	29,025 (4.05%)	9,063 (1.26%)	3,724 (0.52%)
1900	766,779	327,108 (42.66%)	192,267 (25.07%)	139,412 (18.18%)	30,068 (3.92%)	10,055 (1.31%)	67,869 (8.85%) (Note: For the most part Bunjevac and Šokac.)
1910	812,385	363,518 (44.75%)	190,697 (23.47%)	145,063 (17.86%)	30,137 (3.71%)	10,760 (1.32%)	72,210 (8.89%) (Note: For the most part Bunjevac and Šokac.)

Population by religion (Note: Only religious communities > 1% are displayed.)
Census	Total	Roman Catholic	Eastern Orthodox	Lutheran	Calvinist	Jewish	Greek Catholic	Other or unknown
1880	638,063	407,003 (63.79%)	121,838 (19.09%)	57,238 (8.97%)	24,227 (3.80%)	17,141 (2.69%)	8,696 (1.36%)	1,920 (0.30%)
1890	716,488	461,027 (64.35%)	131,303 (18.33%)	64,810 (9.05%)	27,934 (3.90%)	19,115 (2.67%)	9,983 (1.39%)	2,316 (0.32%)
1900	766,779	498,216 (64.98%)	138,344 (18.04%)	68,526 (8.94%)	29,261 (3.82%)	18,793 (2.45%)	10,814 (1.41%)	2,825 (0.37%)
1910	812,385	534,682 (65.82%)	146,015 (17.97%)	70,098 (8.63%)	29,772 (3.66%)	18,244 (2.25%)	11,684 (1.44%)	1,890 (0.23%)

As for the geographical distribution of the four largest ethnic groups in 1910, Hungarians mainly lived in the northern parts of the county, Germans in the western parts, Croats (including Bunjevci and Šokci) around Szabadka and Serbs in the southern parts. The city of Újvidék in the southern part of the county was the cultural and political centre of the Serbs in the 18th and 19th centuries.

== Subdivisions ==
In the early 20th century, the subdivisions of Bács-Bodrog county were:

Districts (járás)	
District	Capital
Apatin	Apatin (now Apatin)
Bácsalmás	Bácsalmás
Baja	Baja
Hódság	Hódság (now Odžaci)
Kula	Kula (now Kula)
Óbecse	Óbecse (now Bečej)
Palánka	Palánka (now Stara Palanka)
Titel	Titel (now Titel)
Topolya	Topolya (now Bačka Topola)
Újvidék	Újvidék (now Novi Sad)
Zenta	Zenta (now Senta)
Zombor	Zombor (now Sombor)
Zsablya	Zsablya (now Žabalj)
Urban counties (törvényhatósági jogú város)
Baja
Szabadka (now Subotica)
Újvidék (now Novi Sad)
Zombor (now Sombor)
Urban districts (rendezett tanácsú város)
Magyarkanizsa (from 1908; now Kanjiža)
Zenta (now Senta)

The towns of Baja and Bácsalmás are now in Hungary; the other towns mentioned are now in Serbia.

=== Earlier subdivisions ===
In the early 19th century Bács-Bodrog County was divided into:

- Processus Superior or Felső járás ("upper district"): the north-western part of the county, including Baja
- Processus Medius or Közép járás ("middle district"): the western part, centred on Zombor (Sombor), which also included Apatin and Bezadán (Bezdan)
- Processus Inferior or Alsó járás ("lower district"): the southern part, including Bács (Bač), Neoplanta (Uj-Vidék/Novi Sad/Neusatz) and Ó-Futak (Futog)
- Processus Tybiscanus or Tisza járás ("Tisza district"): the eastern part, including Maria Theresianopolis (Szabatka/Subotica), as well as Ó-Becse (Bečej), Temerin, Zenta (Senta) and Kis-/Magyar-Kanizsa (Kanjiža)

Šajkaška was part of the Military Frontier at this time.

== See also ==
- Bács-Bodrog County Palace
- Bács-Kiskun County
- Eparchy of Bačka
- North Bačka District
- South Bačka District
- West Bačka District

== Sources ==
- Ćirković, Sima (2004). The Serbs. Malden: Blackwell Publishing.
- Fodor, Pál; Dávid, Géza, eds. (2000). Ottomans, Hungarians, and Habsburgs in Central Europe: The Military Confines in the Era of Ottoman Conquest. Leiden: Brill.
- Gavrilović, Slavko (1993). "Serbs in Hungary, Slavonia and Croatia in struggles against the Turks (15th–18th centuries)". Serbs in European Civilization. Belgrade: Nova, Serbian Academy of Sciences and Arts, Institute for Balkan Studies. pp. 41–54.
- Krizman, Bogdan (1970). "The Belgrade Armistice of 13 November 1918". The Slavonic and East European Review. 48 (110): 67–87.
- Točanac-Radović, Isidora (2022). "The Great Migration of Serbs and the Question of the Serbian Ethnic and Religious Community in the Habsburg Monarchy". Migrations in the Slavic Cultural Space: From the Middle Ages to the Present Day. Łódź: Łódź University Press. pp. 15–27.
