= SV Tasmania Berlin =

German football club

- Full name: Sportverein Tasmania Berlin e. V.
- Founded: 3 February 1973; 53 years ago
- Ground: Werner-Seelenbinder-Sportpark
- Capacity: 3,000
- Chairman: Almir Numic
- Head coach: Pardis Fardjad-Azad
- League: Regionalliga Nordost (IV)
- 2025–26: NOFV-Oberliga Nord, 1st of 16 (promoted)
Home colours

SV Tasmania Berlin is a German football club based in the Ortsteil (locality) of Neukölln of the borough of the same name in Berlin, Germany. It was established in 1973 as a phoenix club by members of SC Tasmania 1900 Berlin, a club based in the same district that became bankrupt and was dissolved that same year. After five seasons playing in local leagues in West Berlin, it was promoted to the fourth tier of what was then the West German Deutsche Fußball Liga at the end of the 1977-1978 season. As of May 2026 it is the champion of the fifth-tier NOFV-Oberliga Nord, gaining promotion to the Regionalliga Nordost in the fourth tier.

== History ==
=== Origins ===
SV Tasmania Berlin trace their origins back to SC Tasmania 1900 Berlin, founded in 1900. The club’s name derives from Tasmania 1900’s founders wanting to emigrate to the island state of Tasmania in Australia. SC Tasmania 1900 Berlin achieved a unique place in German football history by playing a single season in the top flight, the 1965–66 Bundesliga, that set numerous records due to the team’s poor performance.

By the early 1970s SC Tasmania 1900 Berlin were suffering dire financial issues, so the amateur and youth players of the club decided to establish their own club on 3 February 1973, which they named SV Tasmania 73 Neukölln. Later that year, many club officials and players followed suit to support the new team in Neukölln as Tasmania 1900 was declared bankrupt and was disbanded.

=== Early years in the West German leagues ===
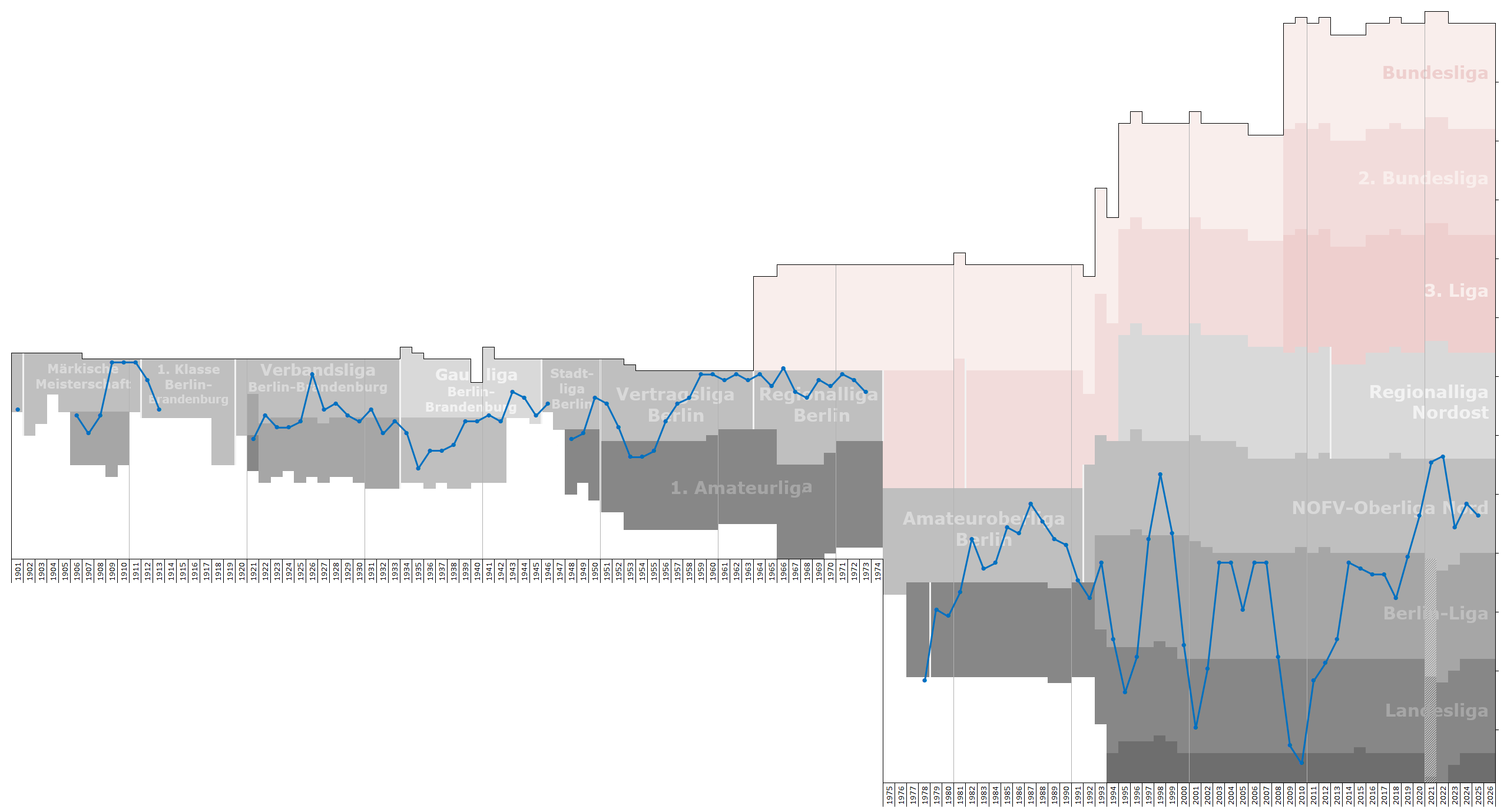
Historical chart of the club's league performance

=== Post-unification ===
Tasmania 73 played the 1997–98 season and 1998–99 season in the NOFV-Oberliga Nord, which at that time was the fourth tier of the German football league system. In December 2000, the club was renamed SV Tasmania-Gropiusstadt 1973, after Gropiusstadt, another Ortsteil within the Berlin borough of Neukölln. After two consecutive relegations and two seasons in the Landesliga ending in promotion at the end of the 2001-02 season, Tasmania-Gropiusstadt played five seasons in the fifth-tier Verbandsliga Berlin, with them finishing second in 2003, 2004, 2006 and the 2006-07 season.

Following a league restructure and two relegations in succession, the club played the 2009–10 season in the eighth-tier Bezirksliga Berlin Staffel 3, finishing second and gaining promotion to the Landesliga Berlin Staffel 2 for the 2010–11 season. In 2011, the club was renamed SV Tasmania Berlin. After finishing first in the 2011–12 Landesliga season the club was promoted once again to the Berlin-Liga. Tasmania won the 2018–2019 season and was promoted to the fifth-tier NOFV-Oberliga Nord for the 2019–2020 season. It then topped the league table for the second consecutive season, although it only played nine games due to the COVID-19 pandemic. In its 2021–2022 season in the Regionalliga Nordost it finished last and was relegated back to the fifth tier. After several seasons in the NOFV-Oberliga Nord it won the league in the 2025-26 season and promotion back to the Regionalliga Nordost.

== Stadium ==
SV Tasmania Berlin's home matches are played at the 3,000-capacity Werner-Seelenbinder-Sportpark in Berlin-Neukölln, directly adjacent to Tempelhofer Feld, the site of the former Berlin Tempelhof Airport.

== League positions since 1978 ==
As a new club, Tasmania 73 Neukölln played the 1973-74 season in the seventh tier of West German league football, in a West Berlin local league. The team won three promotions in five years, being promoted to the Landesliga Berlin, in the fourth and lowest tier of West German national competition, at the end of the 1977-1978 season. Since then, apart from being in the eighth tier in its first season under its current name, it has played between the seventh and third tiers of national West German and (since the integration of the East German football league system in the 1991-1992 season) unified German football.

As Tasmania 73 Neukölln
Year	Division (Tier)	Position
1978–1979	Landesliga Berlin (IV)	5th
1979–1980	Landesliga Berlin (IV)	6th
1980–1981	Landesliga Berlin (IV)	2nd
1981–1982	Amateur-Oberliga Berlin (III)	9th
1982–1983	Amateur-Oberliga Berlin (III)	14th
1983–1984	Amateur-Oberliga Berlin (III)	13th
1984–1985	Amateur-Oberliga Berlin (III)	7th
1985–1986	Amateur-Oberliga Berlin (III)	8th
1986–1987	Amateur-Oberliga Berlin (III)	3rd
1987–1988	Amateur-Oberliga Berlin (III)	6th
1988–1989	Amateur-Oberliga Berlin (III)	9th
1989–1990	Amateur-Oberliga Berlin (III)	10th
1990–1991	Amateur-Oberliga Berlin (III)	16th
1991–1992	Landesliga Berlin (IV)	3rd
1992–1993	Verbandsliga Berlin (IV)	5th
1993–1994	Verbandsliga Berlin (IV)	18th
1994–1995	Landesliga Berlin (VI)	8th
1995–1996	Landesliga Berlin (VI)	2nd
1996–1997	Verbandsliga Berlin (V)	1st
1997–1998	Oberliga Nord (IV)	6th
1998–1999	Oberliga Nord (IV)	16th
1999–2000	Verbandsliga Berlin (V)	19th

As Tasmania Gropiusstadt 1973
Year	Division (tier)	Position
2000–2001	Landesliga Berlin (VI)	12th
2001–2002	Landesliga Berlin (VI)	2nd
2002–2003	Verbandsliga Berlin (V)	2nd
2003–2004	Verbandsliga Berlin (V)	2nd
2004–2005	Verbandsliga Berlin (V)	10th
2005–2006	Verbandsliga Berlin (V)	2nd
2006–2007	Verbandsliga Berlin (V)	2nd
2007–2008	Verbandsliga Berlin (V)	18th
2008–2009	Landesliga Berlin (VII)	15th

As Tasmania Berlin
Year	Division (tier)	Position
2009–2010	Bezirksliga Berlin (VIII)	2nd
2010–2011	Landesliga Berlin (VII)	4th
2011–2012	Landesliga Berlin (VII)	1st
2012–2013	Berlin-Liga (VI)	15th
2013–2014	Berlin-Liga (VI)	2nd
2014–2015	Berlin-Liga (VI)	3rd
2015–2016	Berlin-Liga (VI)	4th
2016–2017	Berlin-Liga (VI)	4th
2017–2018	Berlin-Liga (VI)	8th
2018–2019	Berlin-Liga (VI)	1st
2019–2020	NOFV-Oberliga Nord (V)	10th
2020–2021	NOFV-Oberliga Nord (V)	1st
2021–2022	Regionalliga Nordost (IV)	20th
2022–2023	OFV-Oberliga Nord (V)	12th
2023–2024	OFV-Oberliga Nord (V)	8th
2024–2025	OFV-Oberliga Nord (V)	10th
2025–2026	NOFV-Oberliga Nord (V)	1st

== Current squad ==
As of 8 September 2026

Note: Flags indicate national team as defined under FIFA eligibility rules; some limited exceptions apply. Players may hold more than one non-FIFA nationality.

No.	Pos.	Nation	Player
1	GK	GER	Elias Höftmann
3	DF	TUN	Youssef Labbouz
4	DF	GER	Steffen Eder
5	MF	JPN	Rintaro Yajima
6	DF	GER	Kerem Yayla
7	FW	GER	Karim-Joel Barry
8	MF	GER	Konstantinos Grigoriadis
9	FW	BRA	Pedro Magalhaes
10	MF	TUR	Tahsin Çakmak
11	FW	TUR	Abdulkadir Beyazıt
12	DF	GER	Kurjakus Jakob
14	FW	GHA	Shean Mensah
15	DF	NGR	Jamilu Collins
17	DF	GER	Fatih Baca
18	MF	GER	David Danko

No.	Pos.	Nation	Player
19	DF	GER	Felix Rehder
21	FW	GER	Yona Sambale
22	DF	GER	Ensar Bekdemir
26	MF	GER	Deji Beyreuther
27	DF	GER	Paul Ziehme
29	FW	GER	Erich Berko
30	DF	GER	Danil Wostrikow
33	GK	POL	Mateusz Mika
35	GK	GER	Henrik Albert
36	MF	GER	Luka Janeš (on loan from Heidenheim)
37	MF	BIH	Amar Numic
42	MF	GER	Sevhat Agbaba
61	MF	BUL	Stoyan Valchev
77	FW	PLE	Ali Abu Alfa
—	MF	KOS	Lorik Bushi

== Honours ==
The club's honours:

- NOFV-Oberliga
  - Champions: 2021, 2026
- Verbandsliga Berlin
  - Champions: 1997, 2019
- Berliner Landespokal
  - Runners-up: 2014, 2015
