= 2026–27 Eintracht Frankfurt season =

Eintracht Frankfurt
2026–27 season
- President: Mathias Beck
- Board members: Timmo Hardung; Axel Hellmann; Julien Zamberk; Philipp Reschke
- Head coach: Adi Hütter
- Bundesliga: 7th
- DFB-Pokal: Round of 16
- Top goalscorer: League: Jonathan Burkardt; Younes Ebnoutalib (both 6); All: Jonathan Burkardt (10)
- Highest home attendance: 60,100 (sold out) 19 September 2026 v SC Freiburg
- Lowest home attendance: 59,100 6 September 2016 v FC Augsburg (league)
- Average home league attendance: 59,500
Home colours	Away colours	Third colours
- All statistics correct as of 21 November 2026.

The 2026–27 season is the 127th season in the history of Eintracht Frankfurt, a football club based in Frankfurt, Germany. In addition to the domestic league, Eintracht Frankfurt is also participating in this season's edition of the DFB-Pokal. This is the 102nd season for Frankfurt in the Deutsche Bank Park, located in Frankfurt, Hesse, Germany. The season covers a period from 1 July 2026 to 30 June 2027.

== Players ==
=== First-team squad ===
As of 1 November 2026

Note: Flags indicate national team as defined under FIFA eligibility rules; some limited exceptions apply. Players may hold more than one non-FIFA nationality.

No.	Pos.	Nation	Player
1	GK	GER	Noah Atubolu (on loan from SC Freiburg)
2	DF	GER	Elias Baum
3	DF	FRA	Lilian Brassier
4	DF	GER	Robin Koch (captain)
5	DF	BRA	Otávio
6	MF	DEN	Oscar Højlund
7	FW	GER	Ansgar Knauff
8	MF	ALG	Farès Chaïbi
9	FW	GER	Jonathan Burkardt
11	FW	GER	Younes Ebnoutalib
15	MF	GER	Noël Aséko
20	FW	JPN	Ritsu Dōan
22	DF	USA	Timothy Chandler
23	MF	GER	Niko Iličević
25	MF	NGR	Raphael Onyedika
26	DF	JPN	Keita Kosugi

No.	Pos.	Nation	Player
27	MF	GER	Mario Götze (vice-captain)
29	FW	MAR	Ayoube Amaimouni
31	MF	SWE	Love Arrhov
33	GK	GER	Jens Grahl
34	DF	GER	Nnamdi Collins
35	FW	DEN	Malik Pimpong
37	DF	GER	Jeremiaha Maluze
38	MF	GER	Eba Bekir İş
39	GK	BIH	Amil Šiljević
40	GK	BRA	Kauã Santos
42	FW	TUR	Can Uzun
44	FW	GER	Jessic Ngankam
45	MF	USA	Marvin Dills

=== Players out on loan ===
Note: Flags indicate national team as defined under FIFA eligibility rules; some limited exceptions apply. Players may hold more than one non-FIFA nationality.

No.	Pos.	Nation	Player
—	FW	FRA	Jean-Mattéo Bahoya (at Leeds United until 30 June 2027)
—	DF	MLI	Fousseny Doumbia (at Energie Cottbus until 30 June 2027)
—	FW	GER	Noel Futkeu (at SV Elversberg until 30 June 2027)
—	MF	SWE	Hugo Larsson (at Fulham until 30 June 2027)
—	MF	HUN	Krisztián Lisztes (at Ferencváros until 30 June 2027)

No.	Pos.	Nation	Player
—	DF	FRA	Niels Nkounkou (at OGC Nice until 30 June 2027)
—	FW	GER	Alexander Staff (at 1. FC Saarbrücken until 30 June 2027)
—	DF	BEL	Arthur Theate (at Bologna FC until 30 June 2027)
—	FW	CIV	Elye Wahi (at OGC Nice until 30 June 2027)

== Transfers ==
=== In ===
No.	Pos.	Player	Transferred from	Fee	Date	Source
35	FW	(Denmark) Malik Pimpong	(Denmark) Midtjylland	€3.5M	1 July 2026	
43	MF	(Cameroon) Junior Dina Ebimbe	(France) Brest	Loan return	1 July 2026	
44	FW	(Germany) Jessic Ngankam	(Austria) Wolfsberger AC	Loan return	1 July 2026	
46	FW	(Germany) Noel Futkeu	(Germany) Greuther Fürth	€1.3M	1 July 2026	
48	DF	(France) Niels Nkounkou	(Italy) Torino	Loan return	1 July 2026	
	DF	(Croatia) Hrvoje Smolčić	(Turkey) Kocaelispor	Loan return	1 July 2026	
	GK	(Albania) Simon Simoni	(Germany) 1. FC Kaiserslautern	Loan return	1 July 2026	
17	FW	(Ivory Coast) Elye Wahi	(France) Nice	Loan return	1 July 2026	
15	MF	(Germany) Noël Aséko	(Germany) Bayern Munich	€12M	18 July 2026	
5	DF	(Brazil) Otávio	(Portugal) Estrela da Amadora	€4.5M	27 July 2026	
25	MF	(Nigeria) Raphael Onyedika	(Belgium) Club Brugge	€9M	2 August 2026	
1	GK	(Germany) Noah Atubolu	(Germany) SC Freiburg	Loan (€1M)	28 August 2026	
3	DF	(France) Lilian Brassier	(France) Stade Rennais	€9M	31 August 2026	
23	MF	(Germany) Niko Iličević	(Germany) Eintracht Frankfurt academy	Free	31 October 2026	

=== Out ===
No.	Pos.	Player	Transferred to	Fee	Date	Source
18	MF	(Germany) Mahmoud Dahoud	(United Arab Emirates) United FC	Free Agent	1 July 2026	
41	DF	(Mali) Fousseny Doumbia	(Germany) Energie Cottbus	Loan	1 July 2026	
	MF	(Hungary) Noah Fenyő	(Hungary) Újpest	Undisclosed	1 July 2026	
53	FW	(Germany) Alexander Staff	(Germany) 1. FC Saarbrücken	Loan	1 July 2026	
	MF	(Hungary) Krisztián Lisztes	(Hungary) Ferencváros	Loan	1 July 2026	
13	DF	(Denmark) Rasmus Kristensen	(Denmark) Midtjylland	€6M	1 July 2026	
	FW	(France) Arnaud Kalimuendo	(England) Nottingham Forest	End of loan	1 July 2026	
	DF	(Croatia) Hrvoje Smolčić	(Turkey) Çorum	€1.25M	1 July 2026	
21	DF	(Germany) Nathaniel Brown	(Germany) Bayern Munich	€55M	3 July 2026	
5	DF	(Switzerland) Aurèle Amenda	(England) Coventry City	€18M	16 July 2026	
	GK	(Albania) Simon Simoni	(Switzerland) Luzern	€250,000	21 July 2026	
43	MF	(Cameroon) Junior Dina Ebimbe	(Germany) Schalke 04	€1M	7 August 2026	
46	FW	(Germany) Noel Futkeu	(Germany) SV Elversberg	Loan	15 August 2026	
30	FW	(Belgium) Michy Batshuayi	(Saudi Arabia) Abha	Free	17 August 2026	
15	MF	(Tunisia) Ellyes Skhiri	(Germany) 1. FC Köln	€1M	21 August 2026	
17	FW	(Ivory Coast) Elye Wahi	(France) OGC Nice	Loan	24 August 2026	
23	GK	(Germany) Michael Zetterer	(England) Leeds United	€5M	29 August 2026	
3	DF	(Belgium) Arthur Theate	(Italy) Bologna FC 1909	Loan	30 August 2026	
48	DF	(France) Niels Nkounkou	(France) OGC Nice	Loan	1 September 2026	
16	MF	(Sweden) Hugo Larsson	(England) Fulham	Loan	1 September 2026	
19	FW	(France) Jean-Mattéo Bahoya	(England) Leeds United	Loan	2 September 2026	

== Friendly matches ==
Win Draw Loss

18 July 2026	FC Gießen (Germany)	1–7	(Germany) Eintracht Frankfurt	Giessen, Germany
17:00 CEST (UTC+2)	Demir 89'		Ebnoutalib 11'; Dills 16'; Burkardt 26', 36'; Pimpong 57', 69'; Arrhov 60'	Stadium: Waldstadion; Attendance: 4,999

26 July 2026	Eintracht Frankfurt (Germany)	3–0	(Turkey) Trabzonspor	Austria
15:30 CEST (UTC+2)	Larsson 9'; Burkardt 38' (pen.); Nwaiwu 57' (o.g.)	Report		Stadium: Training pitch
Note: The match was supposed to be played behind closed doors but supporters from both teams attended and watched the match through the bordering fences.

1 August 2026	Waldhof Mannheim (Germany)	0–1	(Germany) Eintracht Frankfurt	Mannheim, Germany
17:00 CEST (UTC+2)		Report	Burkardt 51'	Stadium: Carl-Benz-Stadion; Attendance: 11,586

8 August 2026	Eintracht Frankfurt (Germany)	2–0	(England) Hull City	Dreieich, Germany
15:00 CEST (UTC+2)	Burkardt 56'; Arrhov 71'	Report		Stadium: Sportpark Dreieich; Attendance: 2,522

12 August 2026	FSV Frankfurt (Germany)	1–5	(Germany) Eintracht Frankfurt	Dreieich, Germany
18:30 CEST (UTC+2)	Iorga 63'		Otávio 22'; Ebnoutalib 23'; Burkardt 33'; Pimpong 47'; Doan 77'	Stadium: PSD Bank Arena; Attendance: 10,083

15 August 2026	Brentford (England)	7–0	(Germany) Eintracht Frankfurt	Brentford, England
15:00 BST (UTC+1)	Schade 2', 70'; Sangaré 12'; Thiago 41', 68'; Ouattara 51'; Lewis-Potter 57'	Report		Stadium: Brentford Community Stadium; Attendance: 13,753

2 October 2026	Eintracht Frankfurt (Germany)	4–0	(Germany) Eintracht Braunschweig	Frankfurt, Germany
15:30 CEST (UTC+2)	Götze (yellow card) 12'; Otávio 33'; Tempelmann 58' (o.g.); Knauff 68'; Wünsch 79'	Report		Stadium: Deutsche Bank Park training pitch Attendance: 0
Note: The match was played behind closed doors.

== Competitions ==
Win Draw Loss

=== Overall record ===
Competition	First match	Last match	Starting round	Record							
Competition	First match	Last match	Starting round	Pld	W	D	L	GF	GA	GD	Win %
Bundesliga	29 August 2026	22 May 2027	Matchday 1	4	1	2	1	9	10	−1	25.00
DFB-Pokal	21 August 2026		First round	2	2	0	0	15	1	+14	100.00
Total				6	3	2	1	24	11	+13	50.00

Source: Soccerway

=== Bundesliga ===
==== League table ====
Pos	Team	Pld	W	D	L	GF	GA	GD	Pts	Qualification or relegation
5	Bayer Leverkusen	10	6	1	3	24	17	+7	19	Qualification for the Europa League league phase (Note: The 2026–27 DFB-Pokal winners also qualify for the Europa League league stage (or the sixth-placed team if the DFB-Pokal winners finish in the top five of the Bundesliga). If the DFB-Pokal winners finish in the top six of the Bundesliga, the Conference League spot will be passed to the seventh-placed team.)
6	Werder Bremen	9	4	3	2	17	15	+2	15	Qualification for the Conference League play-off round
7	Eintracht Frankfurt	10	4	3	3	16	20	−4	15	
8	SV Elversberg	10	4	1	5	17	19	−2	13	
9	VfB Stuttgart	9	4	0	5	15	15	0	12	

Updated to match(es) played on 21 November 2026. Source: Bundesliga
Rules for classification: 1) Points; 2) Goal difference; 3) Goals scored; 4) Head-to-head aggregate results; 5) Head-to-head away goals scored; 6) Away goals scored; 7) Play-off at neutral site.
(Rules 4–6 only apply after all home-and-away matches have been played between the tied teams. Rule 7 only applies after the completion of the season.)

==== Results summary ====
Overall								Home						Away					
Pld	W	D	L	GF	GA	GD	Pts	W	D	L	GF	GA	GD	W	D	L	GF	GA	GD
10	4	3	3	16	20	−4	15	3	1	1	8	7	+1	1	2	2	8	13	−5

Last updated: 21 November 2026.
Source: Bundesliga

==== Results by round ====
Round	1	2	3	4	5	6	7	8	9	10	11	12	13	14	15	16	17	18	19	20	21	22	23	24	25	26	27	28	29	30	31	32	33	34
Ground	A	H	A	H	A	H	A	H	A	H	A	H	A	A	H	A	H	H	A	H	A	H	A	H	A	H	A	H	A	H	H	A	H	A
Result	D	L	W	D	L	W	L	W	D	W																								
Position	8	13	9	10	14	11	14	8	10																									

Updated to match(es) played on 21 November 2026. Source: DFB
A = Away; H = Home; W = Win; D = Draw; L = Loss

==== Matches ====
29 August 2026 1	Union Berlin	3–3	Eintracht Frankfurt	Berlin
15:30 CEST (UTC+2)	Lath 3'; Aebischer (yellow card) 23'; Querfeld 79'; Van Den Bosch (yellow card) 81'; Skarke 90+2'	Report	Ebnoutalib 10', 11', 67', (yellow card) 11'; Maluze (yellow card) 13'; Onyedika (yellow card) 84'; Otávio (yellow card) 90'	Stadium: Stadion An der Alten Försterei; Attendance: 22,012; Referee: Bastian Dankert

6 September 2026 2	Eintracht Frankfurt	1–4	FC Augsburg	Frankfurt
17:30 CEST (UTC+2)	Burkardt 6'; Kosugi (yellow card) 45'	Report	Banks (yellow card) 36'; Baum 46' (o.g.); Fellhauer 47'; Claude-Maurice 65'; Rieder 89'	Stadium: Deutsche Bank Park; Attendance: 59,100; Referee: Daniel Schlager

12 September 2026 3	Mainz 05	1–3	Eintracht Frankfurt	Mainz
15:30 CEST (UTC+2)	Amiri (penalty missed) 43'; Tietz 89'	Report	Uzun 9', 60'; Onyedika (yellow card) 41'; Burkardt 45+1'; Götze (yellow card) 70'	Stadium: Mewa Arena; Attendance: 33,305; Referee: Felix Zwayer

19 September 2026 4	Eintracht Frankfurt	2–2	SC Freiburg	Frankfurt
15:30 CEST (UTC+2)	Onyedika (yellow card) 9'; Ebnoutalib 10'; Burkardt 36'; Højlund (yellow card) 56'	Report	Scherhant 34'; Backhaus (yellow card) 37'; Suzuki 48'; Höler (yellow card) 88'	Stadium: Deutsche Bank Park; Attendance: 60,100; Referee: Sören Storks

10 October 2026 5	RB Leipzig	6–0	Eintracht Frankfurt	Leipzig
18:30 CEST (UTC+2)	Banzuzi 1'; Nkunku 5', 41', 44'; El Aynaoui (yellow card) 27'; Nusa 54'; Gomis 89'	Report	Baum (yellow card) 62'; Knauff (yellow card) 76'; Onyedika (yellow card) 84'	Stadium: Red Bull Arena; Attendance: 47,800; Referee: Daniel Siebert

16 October 2026 6	Eintracht Frankfurt	1–0	1. FC Köln	Frankfurt
20:30 CEST (UTC+2)	Götze (yellow card) 24'; Brassier (yellow card) 39'; Ebnoutalib 77'	Report	Jóhannesson (yellow card) 45'; Sosa (yellow card) 90+4'	Stadium: Deutsche Bank Park; Attendance: 59,600; Referee: Benjamin Brand

24 October 2026 7	Borussia Dortmund	1–0	Eintracht Frankfurt	Dortmund
18:30 CEST (UTC+2)	Beier 80'	Report	Collins (yellow card) 58'; Chaïbi (yellow card) 63'	Stadium: Westfalenstadion; Attendance: 81,365; Referee: Sven Jablonski

1 November 2026 8	Eintracht Frankfurt	3–1	Hamburger SV	Frankfurt
16:30 CET (UTC+1)	Omari 10' (o.g.); Onyedika 47'; Ebnoutalib 69'; Baum (yellow card) 85'; Koch (yellow card) 90+8'	Report	Moffi 14'; Nandja (yellow card) 33'; Adeline (yellow card) 70'; Omari (yellow card) 76'; Stange (yellow card) 90+8'	Stadium: Deutsche Bank Park; Attendance: 59,600; Referee: Florian Exner

7 November 2026 9	SC Paderborn	2–2	Eintracht Frankfurt	Paderborn
15:30 CET (UTC+1)	Obermair 45'; Pieringer 73' (pen.); Zeitler (yellow card) 80'	Report	Burkardt 23', 90+3'; Baum (yellow card) 60' (yellow-red card) 75'; Collins (yellow card) 86'	Stadium: Home Deluxe Arena; Attendance: 15,000; Referee: Bastian Dankert

21 November 2026 10	Eintracht Frankfurt	1–0	TSG Hoffenheim	Frankfurt
15:30 CET (UTC+1)	Burkardt 25', (penalty missed) 44'; Atubolu (yellow card) 90+3'; Pimpong (yellow card) 90+5'	Report	Kramarić (penalty missed) 41'; Avdullahu (yellow card) 44'; Burger (yellow card) 88'; Kabak (yellow card) 90+3' (red card)	Stadium: Deutsche Bank Park; Attendance: 59,100; Referee: Max Burda

28 November 2026 11	VfB Stuttgart	v	Eintracht Frankfurt	Stuttgart
18:30 CET (UTC+1)				Stadium: MHPArena

5 December 2026 12	Eintracht Frankfurt	v	Werder Bremen	Frankfurt
18:30 CET (UTC+1)				Stadium: Deutsche Bank Park

12 December 2026 13	Borussia Mönchengladbach	v	Eintracht Frankfurt	Mönchengladbach
18:30 CET (UTC+1)				Stadium: Borussia-Park

19 December 2026 14	Bayer Leverkusen	v	Eintracht Frankfurt	Leverkusen
15:30 CET (UTC+1)				Stadium: BayArena

9 January 2027 15	Eintracht Frankfurt	v	Schalke 04	Frankfurt
15:30 CET (UTC+1)				Stadium: Deutsche Bank Park

13 January 2027 16	SV Elversberg	v	Eintracht Frankfurt	Spiesen-Elversberg
18:30 CET (UTC+1)				Stadium: Waldstadion an der Kaiserlinde

16 January 2027 17	Eintracht Frankfurt	v	Bayern Munich	Frankfurt
18:30 CET (UTC+1)				Stadium: Deutsche Bank Park

24 January 2027 18	Eintracht Frankfurt	v	Union Berlin	Frankfurt
15:30 CET (UTC+1)				Stadium: Deutsche Bank Park

29–31 January 2027 19	FC Augsburg	v	Eintracht Frankfurt	Augsburg
				Stadium: Augsburg Arena

5–7 February 2027 20	Eintracht Frankfurt	v	Mainz 05	Frankfurt
				Stadium: Deutsche Bank Park

12–14 February 2027 21	SC Freiburg	v	Eintracht Frankfurt	Freiburg
				Stadium: Europa-Park Stadion

19–21 February 2027 22	Eintracht Frankfurt	v	RB Leipzig	Frankfurt
				Stadium: Deutsche Bank Park

26–28 February 2027 23	1. FC Köln	v	Eintracht Frankfurt	Cologne
				Stadium: RheinEnergieStadion

2–4 March 2027 24	Eintracht Frankfurt	v	Borussia Dortmund	Frankfurt
				Stadium: Deutsche Bank Park

5–7 March 2027 25	Hamburger SV	v	Eintracht Frankfurt	Hamburg
				Stadium: Volksparkstadion

12–14 March 2027 26	Eintracht Frankfurt	v	SC Paderborn	Frankfurt
				Stadium: Deutsche Bank Park

19–21 March 2027 27	TSG Hoffenheim	v	Eintracht Frankfurt	Sinsheim
				Stadium: Rhein-Neckar-Arena

2–4 April 2027 28	Eintracht Frankfurt	v	VfB Stuttgart	Frankfurt
				Stadium: Deutsche Bank Park

9–11 April 2027 29	Werder Bremen	v	Eintracht Frankfurt	Bremen
				Stadium: Weserstadion

16–18 April 2027 30	Eintracht Frankfurt	v	Borussia Mönchengladbach	Frankfurt
				Stadium: Deutsche Bank Park

23–25 April 2027 31	Eintracht Frankfurt	v	Bayer Leverkusen	Frankfurt
				Stadium: Deutsche Bank Park

7–9 May 2027 32	Schalke 04	v	Eintracht Frankfurt	Gelsenkirchen
				Stadium: Arena AufSchalke

14–16 May 2027 33	Eintracht Frankfurt	v	SV Elversberg	Frankfurt
				Stadium: Deutsche Bank Park

22 May 2027 34	Bayern Munich	v	Eintracht Frankfurt	Munich
15:30 CEST (UTC+02:00)				Stadium: Allianz Arena

=== DFB-Pokal ===
21 August 2026 First round	SC St. Tönis	0–11	Eintracht Frankfurt	Krefeld
18:00 CEST (UTC+2)		Report	Burkardt 4', 29', 41'; Koch 10'; Amaimouni 17'; Uzun 34', 36'; Baum (yellow card) 7' (goal) 44'; Ebnoutalib 45+1'; Götze 45+5'; Chaïbi 87'	Stadium: Grotenburg-Stadion; Attendance: 10,893; Referee: Davina Lutz

27 October 2026 Second round	Hamburger SV	1–3	Eintracht Frankfurt	Hamburg
18:00 CET (UTC+1)	Moffi 79'	Report	Collins (yellow card) 17'; Götze (yellow card) 33'; Koch 56'; Maluze (yellow card) 69'; Burkardt 71'; Ebnoutalib 75'; Onyedika (yellow card) 86'	Stadium: Volksparkstadion; Attendance: 57,000; Referee: Tobias Stieler

2 December 2026 Round of 16	Eintracht Frankfurt	v	Borussia Dortmund	Frankfurt
20:45 CET (UTC+1)				Stadium: Waldstadion

== Statistics ==
=== Appearances and goals ===
No.	Pos	Nat	Player	Total		Bundesliga		DFB-Pokal	
No.	Pos	Nat	Player	Apps	Goals	Apps	Goals	Apps	Goals
Goalkeepers
1	GK	(Germany) GER	Noah Atubolu	11	0	10	0	1	0
33	GK	(Germany) GER	Jens Grahl	0	0	0	0	0	0
39	GK	(Germany) GER	Amil Šiljević	0	0	0	0	0	0
40	GK	(Brazil) BRA	Kauã Santos	1	0	0	0	1	0
Defenders
2	DF	(Germany) GER	Elias Baum	11	1	7+2	0	2	1
3	DF	(France) FRA	Lilian Brassier	9	0	9	0	0	0
4	DF	(Germany) GER	Robin Koch	11	2	9	0	2	2
5	DF	(Brazil) BRA	Otávio	2	0	0+1	0	1	0
22	DF	(United States) USA	Timothy Chandler	2	0	0+2	0	0	0
26	DF	(Japan) JPN	Keita Kosugi	10	0	8	0	1+1	0
34	DF	(Germany) GER	Nnamdi Collins	7	0	3+3	0	1	0
37	DF	(Germany) GER	Jeremiaha Maluze	4	0	2	0	1+1	0
44	DF	(Ecuador) ECU	Davis Bautista	0	0	0	0	0	0
49	DF	(Spain) ESP	Derek Boakye Osei	0	0	0	0	0	0
Midfielders
6	MF	(Denmark) DEN	Oscar Højlund	4	0	0+4	0	0	0
7	MF	(Germany) GER	Ansgar Knauff	8	0	3+4	0	0+1	0
8	MF	(Algeria) ALG	Farès Chaïbi	9	1	6+1	0	1+1	1
15	MF	(Germany) GER	Noël Aséko	9	1	7+1	1	0+1	0
20	MF	(Japan) JPN	Ritsu Dōan	10	0	9	0	1	0
23	MF	(Germany) GER	Niko Iličević	2	0	0+2	0	0	0
25	MF	(Nigeria) NGR	Raphael Onyedika	12	1	10	1	2	0
27	MF	(Germany) GER	Mario Götze	9	1	2+5	0	2	1
31	MF	(Sweden) SWE	Love Arrhov	5	0	0+4	0	0+1	0
38	MF	(Germany) GER	Ebu Bekir Is	0	0	0	0	0	0
42	MF	(Turkey) TUR	Can Uzun	10	4	7+1	2	2	2
45	MF	(United States) USA	Marvin Dills	0	0	0	0	0	0
Forwards
9	FW	(Germany) GER	Jonathan Burkardt	12	10	9+1	6	2	4
11	FW	(Germany) GER	Younes Ebnoutalib	12	8	7+3	6	1+1	2
29	FW	(Morocco) MAR	Ayoube Amaimouni	6	1	1+4	0	1	1
35	FW	(Denmark) DEN	Malik Pimpong	4	0	0+3	0	0+1	0
50	FW	(Germany) GER	Alessandro Gaul Souza	0	0	0	0	0	0
	FW	(Germany) GER	Jessic Ngankam	0	0	0	0	0	0
Players transferred/loaned out during the season
3	DF	(Belgium) BEL	Arthur Theate	0	0	0	0	0	0
15	MF	(Tunisia) TUN	Ellyes Skhiri	0	0	0	0	0	0
16	MF	(Sweden) SWE	Hugo Larsson	0	0	0	0	0	0
17	FW	(Ivory Coast) CIV	Elye Wahi	0	0	0	0	0	0
19	FW	(France) FRA	Jean-Mattéo Bahoya	0	0	0	0	0	0
23	GK	(Germany) GER	Michael Zetterer	0	0	0	0	0	0
30	FW	(Belgium) BEL	Michy Batshuayi	0	0	0	0	0	0
43	MF	(Cameroon) CMR	Junior Dina Ebimbe	0	0	0	0	0	0
46	FW	(Germany) GER	Noel Futkeu	0	0	0	0	0	0
48	DF	(France) FRA	Niels Nkounkou	0	0	0	0	0	0

Last updated: 21 November 2026
Source: Competitions

=== Goalscorers ===
Rank	No.	Pos.	Nat.	Player	Bundesliga	DFB-Pokal	Total
1	9	FW	(Germany)	Jonathan Burkardt	6	4	10
2	11	FW	(Germany)	Younes Ebnoutalib	6	2	8
3	42	MF	(Turkey)	Can Uzun	2	2	4
4	4	DF	(Germany)	Robin Koch	1	1	2
4	2	DF	(Germany)	Elias Baum	0	1	1
4	8	MF	(Algeria)	Farès Chaïbi	0	1	1
4	25	MF	(Nigeria)	Raphael Onyedika	1	0	1
4	27	MF	(Germany)	Mario Götze	0	1	1
4	29	FW	(Morocco)	Ayoube Amaimouni	0	1	1
Own goals					1	0	1
Totals					13	14	27

Last updated: 21 November 2026

=== Clean sheets ===
Rank	No.	Pos.	Nat.	Player	Bundesliga	DFB-Pokal	Total
1	1	GK	(Germany)	Noah Atubolu	2	0	2
2	40	GK	(Brazil)	Kauã Santos	0	1	1
Totals					2	1	3

Last updated: 21 November 2026

=== Disciplinary record ===
No.	Pos.	Nat.	Player	Bundesliga			DFB-Pokal			Total		
No.	Pos.	Nat.	Player	Yellow card	(yellow card) (yellow-red card)	Red card	Yellow card	(yellow card) (yellow-red card)	Red card	Yellow card	(yellow card) (yellow-red card)	Red card
1	GK	(Germany)	Noah Atubolu	1	0	0	0	0	0	1	0	0
2	DF	(Germany)	Elias Baum	2	1	0	1	0	0	3	1	0
3	DF	(France)	Lilian Brassier	1	0	0	0	0	0	1	0	0
4	DF	(Germany)	Robin Koch	1	0	0	0	0	0	1	0	0
5	DF	(Brazil)	Otávio	1	0	0	0	0	0	1	0	0
6	MF	(Denmark)	Oscar Højlund	1	0	0	0	0	0	1	0	0
7	FW	(Germany)	Ansgar Knauff	1	0	0	0	0	0	1	0	0
8	MF	(Algeria)	Farès Chaïbi	1	0	0	0	0	0	1	0	0
11	FW	(Germany)	Younes Ebnoutalib	1	0	0	0	0	0	1	0	0
25	MF	(Nigeria)	Raphael Onyedika	4	0	0	1	0	0	5	0	0
26	DF	(Japan)	Keita Kosugi	1	0	0	0	0	0	1	0	0
27	MF	(Germany)	Mario Götze	2	0	0	1	0	0	3	0	0
34	DF	(Germany)	Nnamdi Collins	2	0	0	1	0	0	3	0	0
35	FW	(Denmark)	Malik Pimpong	1	0	0	0	0	0	1	0	0
37	DF	(Germany)	Jeremiaha Maluze	1	0	0	1	0	0	2	0	0
Totals				21	1	0	5	0	0	25	1	0

Last updated: 21 November 2026
