= 2026–27 DFB-Pokal =

Tournament details
- Country: Germany
- Venue(s): Olympiastadion, Berlin
- Dates: 21 August 2026 – 29 May 2027
- Teams: 64

Tournament statistics
- Matches played: 48
- Goals scored: 205 (4.27 per match)
- Attendance: 985,241 (20,526 per match)
- Top goal scorer(s): Jonathan Burkardt; Phillip Tietz (4 goals)
- All statistics correct as of 28 October 2026. Goals scored in penalty shoot-outs not included.

The 2026–27 DFB-Pokal is the 84th season of the annual German football cup competition. Sixty-four teams participate in the competition, including all teams from the previous year's Bundesliga and 2. Bundesliga. The competition began on 21 August 2026 with the first of six rounds and will end on 29 May 2027 with the final at the Olympiastadion in Berlin, a nominally neutral venue, which has hosted the final since 1985. The DFB-Pokal is considered the second-most important club title in German football after the Bundesliga championship. The DFB-Pokal is run by the German Football Association (DFB). Bayern Munich are the defending champions.

The winner of the DFB-Pokal earns automatic qualification for the league phase of the 2027–28 edition of the UEFA Europa League. If they have already qualified for the UEFA Champions League through position in the Bundesliga, then the spot will go to the team in sixth, and the league's UEFA Conference League play-off round spot will go to the team in seventh. The winners will also host the 2027 edition of the Franz Beckenbauer Supercup at the start of the next season, and will face the champions of the 2026–27 Bundesliga.

== Participating clubs ==
The following teams qualified for the competition:

Bundesliga the 18 clubs of the 2025–26 season	2. Bundesliga; the 18 clubs of the 2025–26 season	3. Liga; the top 4 clubs of the 2025–26 season
FC Augsburg; Union Berlin; Werder Bremen; Borussia Dortmund; Eintracht Frankfurt; SC Freiburg; Hamburger SV; 1. FC Heidenheim; TSG Hoffenheim; 1. FC Köln; RB Leipzig; Bayer Leverkusen; Mainz 05; Borussia Mönchengladbach; Bayern Munich; FC St. Pauli; VfB Stuttgart; VfL Wolfsburg	Arminia Bielefeld; Eintracht Braunschweig; Hertha BSC; VfL Bochum; Darmstadt 98; Dynamo Dresden; Fortuna Düsseldorf; SV Elversberg; Greuther Fürth; Hannover 96; 1. FC Kaiserslautern; Karlsruher SC; Holstein Kiel; 1. FC Magdeburg; Preußen Münster; 1. FC Nürnberg; SC Paderborn; Schalke 04	VfL Osnabrück; Energie Cottbus; Rot-Weiss Essen; MSV Duisburg
Representatives of the regional associations 24 representatives of 21 regional associations of the DFB, qualified (in general) through the 2025–26 Verbandspokal (Note: The three regions with the most participating teams in their league competitions (Bavaria, Lower Saxony, and Westphalia) were allowed to enter two teams for the competition.)
Baden: Waldhof Mannheim; Bavaria (Note: In addition to a team from the Bavarian Cup, the best-placed amateur team of the Regionalliga Bayern also qualified.): 1860 Munich (CR) (Note: 1860 Munich qualified regardless of the outcome of the final of the Bavarian Cup, as Würzburger Kickers, the other finalists, already qualified through their Regionalliga Bayern position.); Würzburger Kickers (RB) (Note: Würzburger Kickers qualified as runners-up of the Regionalliga Bayern as 1. FC Nürnberg II, the league winners, were ineligible as a reserve team.); Berlin: VSG Altglienicke; Brandenburg: VfB Krieschow (Note: VfB Krieschow qualified regardless of the outcome of the final of the Brandenburg Cup, as Energie Cottbus, the other finalists, already qualified for the DFB-Pokal through their 3. Liga position.); Bremen: SV Hemelingen; Hamburg: Hamburg-Eimsbütteler BC; Hesse: Wehen Wiesbaden	Lower Rhine: SC St. Tönis (Note: SC St. Tönis qualified regardless of the outcome of the final of the Lower Rhine Cup, as MSV Duisburg, the other finalists, have already qualified for the DFB-Pokal through their 3. Liga position.); Lower Saxony (Note: The Lower Saxony Cup was split into two paths: one for 3. Liga and Regionalliga Nord teams, and the other for amateur teams. The winners of each path qualified.): SSV Jeddeloh (3L/RL); Lüneburger SK Hansa (Am.); Mecklenburg-Vorpommern: Hansa Rostock; Middle Rhine: Viktoria Köln; Rhineland: Eintracht Trier; Saarland: 1. FC Saarbrücken; Saxony: Erzgebirge Aue	Saxony-Anhalt: Hallescher FC; Schleswig-Holstein: Phönix Lübeck; South Baden: Bahlinger SC; Southwest: Schott Mainz; Thuringia: Carl Zeiss Jena; Westphalia (Note: In addition to the Westphalian Cup winners, the Oberliga Westfalen champion also qualified.): SC Verl (CW); Westfalia Rhynern (OW); Württemberg: Sonnenhof Großaspach

== Format ==
=== Participation ===
The DFB-Pokal began with a round of 64 teams. The 36 teams of the Bundesliga and 2. Bundesliga, along with the top four finishers of the 3. Liga automatically qualified for the tournament. Of the remaining slots, 21 were given to the cup winners of the regional football associations, the Verbandspokal. The three remaining slots were given to the three regional associations with the most men's teams, which were Bavaria, Lower Saxony and Westphalia. The best-placed amateur team of the Regionalliga Bayern was given the spot for Bavaria. For Lower Saxony, the Lower Saxony Cup was split into two paths: one for 3. Liga and Regionalliga Nord teams, and the other for amateur teams. The winners of each path qualified. For Westphalia, the spot rotated each season between the best-placed Westphalian team of the Regionalliga West and the best-placed amateur team of the Oberliga Westfalen. For the 2025–26 DFB-Pokal, this spot was awarded to a team from the Regionalliga. As every team was entitled to participate in local tournaments which qualified for the association cups, every team could in principle compete in the DFB-Pokal. Reserve teams and combined football sections were not permitted to enter, along with no two teams of the same association or corporation.

=== Draw ===
The draws for the different rounds are conducted as follows:

For the first round, the participating teams are split into two pots of 32 teams each. The first ("amateur") pot contains all teams which qualified through their regional cup competitions, the best four teams of the 3. Liga, and the bottom four teams of the 2. Bundesliga. Every team from this pot is drawn to a team from the second ("professional") pot, which contains all remaining teams: the Bundesliga and the top fourteen 2. Bundesliga teams. The teams from the first pot are guaranteed to host their matches as long as they remain in the competition.

The two-pot scenario is also applied for the second round, with the remaining 3. Liga and/or amateur team(s) in the first pot and the remaining Bundesliga and 2. Bundesliga teams in the other pot. Since the pots will nearly always be of unequal size at this stage, when the first pot is exhausted any outstanding matches are drawn from the other pot with the first-drawn team hosting. For further rounds, the draw is conducted from one pot, with the first-drawn team again hosting unless there are remaining amateur-pot teams.

=== Match rules ===
Teams meet in one game per round. Matches take place for 90 minutes, with two halves of 45 minutes each. If still tied after regulation, 30 minutes of extra time will be played, consisting of two periods of 15 minutes each. If the score is still level after this, the match will be decided by a penalty shoot-out. A coin toss will decide who takes the first penalty. A maximum of nine players can be listed on the substitute bench, while a maximum of five substitutions are allowed. However, each team is only given three opportunities to make substitutions, with a fourth opportunity in extra time, excluding substitutions made at half-time, before the start of extra time and at half-time in extra time. From the round of 16 onward, a video assistant referee will be appointed for all DFB-Pokal matches. Though technically possible, VAR was not used for home matches of Bundesliga clubs prior to the round of 16 in order to provide a uniform approach to all matches.

=== Suspensions ===
If a player receives five yellow cards in the competition, he will then be suspended from the next cup match. Similarly, receiving a second yellow card suspends a player from the next cup match. If a player receives a direct red card, they will be suspended a minimum of one match, but the German Football Association reserves the right to increase the suspension.

=== International qualification ===
The winners of the DFB-Pokal earn automatic qualification for the league stage of next year's edition of the UEFA Europa League. If they have already qualified for the UEFA Champions League through position in the Bundesliga, then the spot will go to the team in sixth place, and the league's UEFA Conference League play-off round spot will go to the team in seventh place. The winners will also host the Franz Beckenbauer Supercup at the start of the next season, and will face the champions of the previous year's Bundesliga, unless the same team wins the Bundesliga and the DFB-Pokal, completing a double. In that case, the runners-up of the Bundesliga will take the spot and host instead.

== Schedule ==
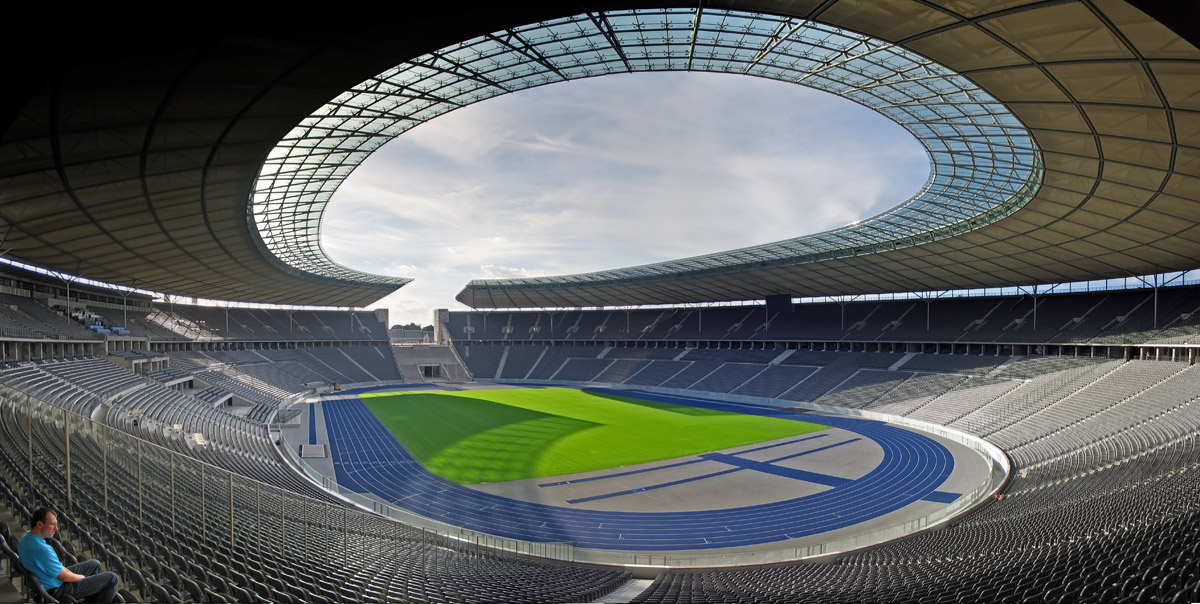
The Olympiastadion in Berlin will host the final.

All draws will generally be held on a Sunday evening after each round (unless noted otherwise).

The rounds of the 2026–27 competition are scheduled as follows:

Round	Draw date	Matches
First round	6 June 2026	21–24 August & 1–2 September 2026
Second round	5 September 2026	27–28 October 2026
Round of 16	1 November 2026	1–2 December 2026
Quarter-finals	6 December 2026	2–3 February & 9–10 February 2027
Semi-finals	14 February 2027	20–21 April 2027
Final	14 February 2027	29 May 2027 at Olympiastadion, Berlin

Times up to 24 October 2026 and from 28 March 2027 are CEST (UTC+2). Times from 25 October 2026 to 27 March 2027 are CET (UTC+1).

== Matches ==
=== First round ===
The draw took place on 6 June 2026, with Deniz Aytekin drawing the matches. The matches took place between 21 August and 2 September 2026.

21 August 2026	Preußen Münster	1–2	Karlsruher SC	Münster
18:00	Ndikom 35'	Report	Wanitzek 69'; Jung 81'	Stadium: LVM-Preußenstadion; Attendance: 13,945; Referee: Florian Badstübner

21 August 2026	Waldhof Mannheim	0–1 (a.e.t.)	1. FC Kaiserslautern	Mannheim
18:00		Report	Kanaté 120'	Stadium: Carl-Benz-Stadion; Attendance: 23,504; Referee: Robert Schröder

21 August 2026	SC St. Tönis	0–11	Eintracht Frankfurt	Krefeld
18:00		Report	Burkardt 4', 29', 41'; Koch 10'; Amaimouni 17'; Uzun 34', 36'; Baum 44'; Ebnoutalib 45+1'; Götze 45+5'; Chaïbi 87'	Stadium: Grotenburg-Stadion; Attendance: 10,398; Referee: Davina Lutz

21 August 2026	Hansa Rostock	0–4	VfB Stuttgart	Rostock
20:45		Report	Pejčinović 18', 37', 82'; Tomás 74'	Stadium: Ostseestadion; Attendance: 27,453; Referee: Sascha Stegemann

22 August 2026	Energie Cottbus	0–2	FC Augsburg	Cottbus
13:00		Report	Kade 49'; Jakić 90+5'	Stadium: LEAG Energie Stadion; Attendance: 14,388; Referee: Robin Braun

22 August 2026	Wehen Wiesbaden	0–4	Bayer Leverkusen	Wiesbaden
13:00		Report	Schick 43'; Vázquez 47'; Tella 69'; Kofane 79'	Stadium: BRITA-Arena; Attendance: 12,000; Referee: Christian Dingert

22 August 2026	Erzgebirge Aue	0–4	TSG Hoffenheim	Aue-Bad Schlema
15:30		Report	Wimmer 6', 45+2'; Burger 17'; Moerstedt 63'	Stadium: eins Erzgebirgsstadion; Attendance: 8,199; Referee: Konrad Oldhafer

22 August 2026	Viktoria Köln	1–1 (a.e.t.) (4–5 p)	1. FC Nürnberg	Cologne
15:30	Sponsel 90+6'	Report	Scobel 56'	Stadium: Sportpark Höhenberg; Attendance: 8,343; Referee: Eric Weisbach
	Penalties
	Sachse (penalty scored); Prokopenko (penalty scored); Fallmann (penalty missed); Eisenhuth (penalty scored); Swider (penalty missed); Maboulou (penalty scored); Jahn (penalty missed)		(penalty scored) Justvan; (penalty scored) Mandic; (penalty scored) Markhiev; (penalty missed) Masouras; (penalty missed) Fernández; (penalty scored) Otto; (penalty scored) Moustfa

22 August 2026	1. FC Saarbrücken	1–1 (a.e.t.) (2–4 p)	Hertha BSC	Saarbrücken
15:30	Fahrner 90+2'	Report	Seguin 69'	Stadium: Ludwigsparkstadion; Attendance: 15,500; Referee: Benjamin Brand
	Penalties
	Cvjetinović (penalty scored); Pick (penalty missed); Rizzuto (penalty scored); Brünker (penalty missed)		(penalty scored) Brekalo; (penalty scored) Gechter; (penalty scored) Schuler; (penalty scored) Sessa

22 August 2026	MSV Duisburg	1–3	SV Elversberg	Duisburg
15:30	Lobinger 54'	Report	Schnellbacher 38'; Onyeka 88', 90+1'	Stadium: Schauinsland-Reisen-Arena; Attendance: 22,662; Referee: Max Burda

22 August 2026	Lüneburger SK Hansa	0–3	Werder Bremen	Hamburg
15:30		Report	Stage 11'; Füllkrug 53' (pen.); Reis 76'	Stadium: Millerntor-Stadion; Attendance: 29,330; Referee: Fabienne Michel

22 August 2026	SV Hemelingen	1–9	Hannover 96	Bremen
15:30	Fikaj 56'	Report	Þórðarson 5', 19'; Gindorf 11', 39', 53'; Hartel 16'; Pichler 21', 88'; Etçibaşı 90+1'	Stadium: Weserstadion; Attendance: 13,217; Referee: Martin Wilke

22 August 2026	Sonnenhof Großaspach	2–2 (a.e.t.) (3–0 p)	Arminia Bielefeld	Aspach
18:00	Rahn 12'; Eisele 55' (pen.)	Report	Russo 40'; Grodowski 42'	Stadium: WIRmachenDRUCK Arena; Attendance: 10,723; Referee: Felix Bickel
	Penalties
	Nuraj (penalty scored); Molinari (penalty scored); Bleicher (penalty scored)		(penalty missed) Bauer; (penalty missed) Handwerker; (penalty missed) Uldriķis

22 August 2026	1860 Munich	0–2	Holstein Kiel	Munich
18:00		Report	Harres 34'; Balzi 90+4'	Stadium: Grünwalder Stadion; Attendance: 14,000; Referee: Felix Weller

22 August 2026	Eintracht Trier	0–6	RB Leipzig	Trier
18:00		Report	Gruda 3'; Orbán 6'; Pelzer 45+1' (o.g.); Harder 76'; Nusa 90+2'; Banzuzi 90+5'	Stadium: Moselstadion; Attendance: 9,000; Referee: Marc Philip Eckermann

23 August 2026	SSV Jeddeloh	5–2	1. FC Heidenheim	Oldenburg
13:00	Krasniqi 13'; Schöppner 27' (o.g.); Hyseni 29', 70' (pen.); Janßen 72'	Report	Wagner 12'; Kaufmann 89'	Stadium: Marschweg-Stadion; Attendance: 4,600; Referee: Jonah Besong

23 August 2026	Greuther Fürth	1–2	VfL Bochum	Fürth
13:00	Dal 77'	Report	Rasmussen 25'; Hofmann 72'	Stadium: Sportpark Ronhof Thomas Sommer; Attendance: 9,285; Referee: Florian Lechner

23 August 2026	Westfalia Rhynern	0–6	Dynamo Dresden	Münster
15:30		Report	Sterner 8'; Hauptmann 17'; Vermeij 30'; Bobzien 34'; İnanoğlu 39'; Wagner 54'	Stadium: Preußenstadion; Attendance: 6,702; Referee: Justin Hasmann

23 August 2026	Schott Mainz	0–5	Borussia Mönchengladbach	Mainz
15:30		Report	Bolin 22', 48'; Hashioka 26'; Ullrich 61'; Mohya 67'	Stadium: Mewa Arena; Attendance: 18,500; Referee: Timo Gansloweit

23 August 2026	Eintracht Braunschweig	2–4	Union Berlin	Braunschweig
15:30	Marie 11', 54'	Report	Van Den Bosch 31'; Rothe 63'; Ljubičić 72', 90+4'	Stadium: Eintracht-Stadion; Attendance: 21,532; Referee: Sören Storks

23 August 2026	Bahlinger SC	0–4	1. FC Magdeburg	Bahlingen
15:30		Report	Zukowski 5', 44'; Michel 31', 77'	Stadium: Kaiserstuhlstadion; Attendance: 3,545; Referee: Felix Wagner

23 August 2026	VfB Krieschow	0–9	Mainz 05	Kolkwitz
15:30		Report	Tietz 19', 26', 32', 57'; Amiri 39', 48'; Becker 43'; Königsdörffer 73'; Böving 88'	Stadium: Sportpark Krieschow; Attendance: 4,000; Referee: Lennart Kernchen

23 August 2026	Carl Zeiss Jena	1–2	Darmstadt 98	Jena
15:30	Löder 39'	Report	Smit 11'; Duijevstijn 41'	Stadium: Ernst-Abbe-Sportfeld; Attendance: 13,296; Referee: Wolfgang Haslberger

23 August 2026	Fortuna Düsseldorf	1–5	SC Freiburg	Düsseldorf
18:00	Schleusener 76'	Report	Höler 18'; Matanović 71', 90+4'; Kübler 74'; Makengo 80'	Stadium: Merkur Spiel-Arena; Attendance: 27,616; Referee: Robert Hartmann

23 August 2026	Phönix Lübeck	2–4	SC Paderborn	Lübeck
18:00	Kretzer 43'; Scheller 75' (o.g.)	Report	Ter Horst 22'; Castañeda 41'; Marino 61'; Vidović 71'	Stadium: Stadion an der Lohmühle; Attendance: 4,414; Referee: Felix Prigan

23 August 2026	Rot-Weiss Essen	2–0	FC St. Pauli	Essen
18:00	Janssen 36'; Telalović 53'	Report		Stadium: Stadion an der Hafenstraße; Attendance: 18,800; Referee: Tobias Reichel

24 August 2026	VSG Altglienicke	3–3 (a.e.t.) (5–6 p)	VfL Wolfsburg	Berlin
18:00	Nietfeld 6'; Saliger 71'; Ibrahimi 109'	Report	Arnold 55', 83'; Wahl 117'	Stadium: Stadion auf dem Wurfplatz; Attendance: 5,000; Referee: Jarno Wienefeld
	Penalties
	Oduah (penalty scored); Kardam (penalty scored); Türpitz (penalty scored); Ersungur (penalty scored); Sonnenberg (penalty missed); Zografakis (penalty scored); Ibrahimi (penalty missed)		(penalty scored) Wahl; (penalty scored) Damar; (penalty scored) Arnold; (penalty missed) Reese; (penalty scored) Besio; (penalty scored) Rexhbecaj; (penalty scored) Fischer

24 August 2026	SC Verl	0–3	Hamburger SV	Verl
18:00		Report	Grønbæk 41', 46'; Lemke 50'	Stadium: Sportclub Arena; Attendance: 5,207; Referee: Lars Erbst

24 August 2026	Würzburger Kickers	1–2	1. FC Köln	Würzburg
18:00	Abrangao 18'	Report	Jóhannesson 62', 77'	Stadium: Akon Arena; Attendance: 12,100; Referee: Martin Petersen

24 August 2026	Hallescher FC	2–5 (a.e.t.)	Schalke 04	Halle
20:45	Kastull 45'; Stierlin 90+1'	Report	Ljubičić 62'; Džeko 81' (pen.), 117'; Sylla 98'; Adamu 106'	Stadium: Leuna-Chemie-Stadion; Attendance: 14,000; Referee: Matthias Jöllenbeck

1 September 2026	Hamburg-Eimsbütteler BC	0–5	Borussia Dortmund	Hamburg
20:45		Report	Wrede 33' (o.g.); Svensson 36'; Inácio 41', 45+2'; Silva 59'	Stadium: Volksparkstadion; Attendance: 45,917; Referee: Tom Bauer

2 September 2026	VfL Osnabrück	1–4	Bayern Munich	Osnabrück
20:45	Meißner 5'	Report	Kane 18', 86' (pen.); Bischof 24'; Olise 73'	Stadium: Stadion an der Bremer Brücke; Attendance: 15,741; Referee: Richard Hempel

=== Second round ===
The draw took place on 5 September 2026, with Bastian Schweinsteiger drawing the matches. The matches took place on 27 and 28 October 2026.

27 October 2026	VfL Bochum	2–0	Mainz 05	Bochum
18:00	Rasmussen 46'; Hofmann 75'	Report		Stadium: Vonovia Ruhrstadion; Attendance: 20,432; Referee: Michael Bacher

27 October 2026	Sonnenhof Großaspach	2–4	FC Augsburg	Aspach
18:00	Molinari 23'; Celiktas 46'	Report	Ribeiro 13', 21'; Ibrahimović 69'; Kade 74'	Stadium: WIRmachenDRUCK Arena; Attendance: 7,438; Referee: Patrick Schwengers

27 October 2026	Rot-Weiss Essen	1–2	RB Leipzig	Essen
18:00	Brumme 9'	Report	Baumgartner 78', 82'	Stadium: Stadion an der Hafenstraße; Attendance: 17,467; Referee: Florian Exner

27 October 2026	Hamburger SV	1–3	Eintracht Frankfurt	Hamburg
18:00	Moffi 79'	Report	Koch 57'; Burkardt 71'; Ebnoutalib 75'	Stadium: Volksparkstadion; Attendance: 57,000; Referee: Tobias Stieler

27 October 2026	1. FC Köln	5–0	Union Berlin	Cologne
20:45	El Mala 32', 60'; Maina 51'; Jóhannesson 78'; Sebulonsen 88'	Report		Stadium: RheinEnergieStadion; Attendance: 49,000; Referee: Sven Jablonski

27 October 2026	Borussia Mönchengladbach	2–0	Karlsruher SC	Mönchengladbach
20:45	Hack 7'; Ullrich 49'	Report		Stadium: Borussia-Park; Attendance: 43,034; Referee: Florian Lechner

27 October 2026	SV Elversberg	0–2	Darmstadt 98	Spiesen-Elversberg
20:45		Report	Kehl 6'; Smit 56'	Stadium: Waldstadion an der Kaiserlinde; Attendance: 8,660; Referee: Daniel Schlager

27 October 2026	Borussia Dortmund	3–2	Werder Bremen	Dortmund
20:45	Guirassy 6'; Chukwuemeka 17'; Sabitzer 90+3'	Report	Füllkrug 65' (pen.), 68'	Stadium: Signal Iduna Park; Attendance: 81,365; Referee: Robert Schröder

28 October 2026	SC Freiburg	3–2	VfL Wolfsburg	Freiburg im Breisgau
18:00	Matanović 6'; Gotō 75', 90+2'	Report	Shiogai 8', 43'	Stadium: Europa-Park Stadion; Attendance: 32,000; Referee: Sören Storks

28 October 2026	Dynamo Dresden	2–0	Schalke 04	Dresden
18:00	Čović 53'; Daferner 88'	Report		Stadium: Rudolf-Harbig-Stadion; Attendance: 30,600; Referee: Wolfgang Haslberger

28 October 2026	SC Paderborn	0–1	VfB Stuttgart	Paderborn
18:00		Report	Undav 90'	Stadium: Home Deluxe Arena; Attendance: 14,846; Referee: Florian Badstübner

28 October 2026	SSV Jeddeloh	0–2	Hertha BSC	Oldenburg
18:00		Report	Brekalo 57'; Eitschberger 63'	Stadium: Marschweg-Stadion; Attendance: 10,000; Referee: Justin Hasmann

28 October 2026	Holstein Kiel	1−1 (a.e.t.) (4−3 p)	TSG Hoffenheim	Kiel
20:45	Kaprálik 23'	Report	Hložek 11'	Stadium: Holstein-Stadion; Attendance: 10,001; Referee: Bastian Dankert
	Penalties
	Kvilitaia (penalty missed); Nekić (penalty scored); Balzi (penalty scored); De Regt (penalty scored); Harres (penalty scored)		(penalty scored) Kramarić; (penalty scored) Asllani; (penalty missed) Avdullahu; (penalty scored) Prass; (penalty missed) Rots

28 October 2026	Hannover 96	0–2	1. FC Kaiserslautern	Hanover
20:45		Report	Luković 14'; Prtajin 86'	Stadium: Heinz von Heiden Arena; Attendance: 35,800; Referee: Konrad Oldhafer

28 October 2026	Bayer Leverkusen	5–2	1. FC Nürnberg	Leverkusen
20:45	Tapsoba 41', 49'; Schick 70' (pen.); Hofmann 78'; Vázquez 89'	Report	Lubach 13'; Haugen 30'	Stadium: BayArena; Attendance: 29,681; Referee: Felix Zwayer

28 October 2026	Bayern Munich	6–1	1. FC Magdeburg	Munich
20:45	Olise 10', 50' (pen.); Saibari 21'; Davies 70'; Brown 73'	Report	Żukowski 15'	Stadium: Allianz Arena; Attendance: 75,000; Referee: Harm Osmers

=== Round of 16 ===
The draw took place on 1 November 2026, with Markus Gaugisch drawing the matches. The matches will take place on 1 and 2 December 2026.

1 December 2026	VfB Stuttgart	v	Dynamo Dresden	Stuttgart
18:00		Report		Stadium: MHPArena

1 December 2026	Holstein Kiel	v	1. FC Köln	Kiel
18:00		Report		Stadium: Holstein-Stadion

1 December 2026	Borussia Mönchengladbach	v	Darmstadt 98	Mönchengladbach
20:45		Report		Stadium: Borussia-Park

1 December 2026	Bayern Munich	v	Hertha BSC	Munich
20:45		Report		Stadium: Allianz Arena

2 December 2026	1. FC Kaiserslautern	v	SC Freiburg	Kaiserslautern
18:00		Report		Stadium: Fritz-Walter-Stadion

2 December 2026	Bayer Leverkusen	v	RB Leipzig	Leverkusen
18:00		Report		Stadium: BayArena

2 December 2026	VfL Bochum	v	FC Augsburg	Bochum
20:45		Report		Stadium: Vonovia Ruhrstadion

2 December 2026	Eintracht Frankfurt	v	Borussia Dortmund	Frankfurt
20:45		Report		Stadium: Deutsche Bank Park

=== Quarter-finals ===
The matches will take place between 2 and 10 February 2027.

=== Semi-finals ===
The matches will take place on 20 and 21 April 2027.

=== Final ===
The final will take place on 29 May 2027.

== Top goalscorers ==
The following were the top scorers of the DFB-Pokal, sorted first by number of goals, and then alphabetically if necessary. Goals scored in penalty shoot-outs are not included.

As of 28 October 2026

Rank	Player	Team	Goals
1	(Germany) Jonathan Burkardt	Eintracht Frankfurt	4
1	(Germany) Phillip Tietz	Mainz 05	4
3	(Germany) Niclas Füllkrug	Werder Bremen	3
3	(Germany) Lars Gindorf	Hannover 96	3
3	(Iceland) Ísak Jóhannesson	1. FC Köln	3
3	(Croatia) Igor Matanovic	SC Freiburg	3
3	(France) Michael Olise	Bayern Munich	3
3	(Germany) Dženan Pejčinović	VfB Stuttgart	3
3	(Poland) Mateusz Żukowski	1. FC Magdeburg	3
10	31 players		2
