= 2026–27 Bundesliga =

Bundesliga
- Season: 2026–27
- Dates: 28 August 2026 – 22 May 2027
- Matches: 90
- Goals: 305 (3.39 per match)
- Top goalscorer: Niclas Füllkrug (10 goals)
- Biggest home win: Munich 7–0 Berlin
- Biggest away win: Hamburg 0–5 Mainz
- Highest scoring: Munich 7–0 Berlin; Mainz 3–4 Leverkusen; Elversberg 4–3 Augsburg; Munich 6–1 Leipzig
- Longest winning run: 4 games Dortmund
- Longest unbeaten run: 10 ames Dortmund; Munich
- Longest winless run: 6 games Mönchengladbach
- Longest losing run: 6 games Mönchengladbach
- Highest attendance: 81,365; Dortmund v Hamburg
- Lowest attendance: 9,307; Elversberg v Leverkusen
- Attendance: 3,464,039 (38,489 per match)
- All statistics correct as of 22 November 2026.

The 2026–27 Bundesliga is the 64th season of the Bundesliga, Germany's premier men's football competition. The season began on 28 August 2026 and will conclude on 22 May 2027.

Bayern Munich are the two-time defending champions after securing their 34th domestic championship (35th overall) in the previous season.

== Teams ==
Locations of the 2026–27 Bundesliga teams

=== Team changes ===
Promoted from 2025–26 2. Bundesliga	Relegated from 2025–26 Bundesliga
Schalke 04; SV Elversberg; SC Paderborn	VfL Wolfsburg; 1. FC Heidenheim; FC St. Pauli

SV Elversberg made their Bundesliga debut, becoming the 59th club in the history of the Bundesliga, while Schalke 04 returned after a three year absence. They replaced FC St. Pauli and 1. FC Heidenheim, after spending time in the top flight for two and three years respectively. SC Paderborn was the third team to be promoted from the 2. Bundesliga after winning the relegation/promotion play-offs against VfL Wolfsburg, returning to the top flight after spending six years in the second tier, whilst Wolfsburg were relegated to the 2. Bundesliga for the first time in the club's history, after gaining promotion to the Bundesliga in 1997. SV Elversberg became the first Saarland team to play in Bundesliga since Saarbrücken's relegation from the top flight in the 1992–93 season.

=== Stadiums and locations ===
Team	Location	Stadium	Capacity	R.
FC Augsburg	Augsburg	WWK Arena	30,660	
Union Berlin	Berlin	Stadion An der Alten Försterei	22,012	
Werder Bremen	Bremen	Weserstadion	42,100	
Borussia Dortmund	Dortmund	Signal Iduna Park	81,365	
SV Elversberg	Spiesen-Elversberg	Waldstadion an der Kaiserlinde	10,000	
Eintracht Frankfurt	Frankfurt	Deutsche Bank Park	59,500	
SC Freiburg	Freiburg im Breisgau	Europa-Park Stadion	34,700	
Hamburger SV	Hamburg	Volksparkstadion	57,000	
TSG Hoffenheim	Sinsheim	PreZero Arena	30,150	
1. FC Köln	Cologne	RheinEnergieStadion	49,698	
RB Leipzig	Leipzig	Red Bull Arena	47,800	
Bayer Leverkusen	Leverkusen	BayArena	30,210	
Mainz 05	Mainz	MEWA Arena	33,305	
Borussia Mönchengladbach	Mönchengladbach	Borussia-Park	54,057	
Bayern Munich	Munich	Allianz Arena	75,000	
SC Paderborn	Paderborn	Home Deluxe Arena	15,000	
Schalke 04	Gelsenkirchen	Veltins-Arena	62,271	
VfB Stuttgart	Stuttgart	MHPArena	60,058	

=== Personnel and kits ===
Team	Manager	Captain	Kit manufacturer	Shirt sponsor	
Team	Manager	Captain	Kit manufacturer	Front	Sleeve
FC Augsburg	(Germany) Manuel Baum	(Netherlands) Jeffrey Gouweleeuw	Mizuno	WWK Versicherung	Siegmund
Union Berlin	(Switzerland) Mauro Lustrinelli	(Austria) Christopher Trimmel	Adidas	Raisin Bank	Kermi
Werder Bremen	(Germany) Daniel Thioune	(Austria) Marco Friedl	Hummel	Matthäi	Ammerländer
Borussia Dortmund	(Croatia) Niko Kovač	(Germany) Emre Can	Puma	Vodafone	Polestar
SV Elversberg	(Germany) Vincent Wagner	(Germany) Lukas Pinckert	Nike	HYLO	Pure Steel
Eintracht Frankfurt	(Austria) Adi Hütter	(Germany) Robin Koch	Adidas	Indeed.com	Deutsche Vermögensberatung
SC Freiburg	(Germany) Julian Schuster	(Germany) Christian Günter	Nike	Lexware	Edeka Herzstücke
Hamburger SV	(Germany) Merlin Polzin	(Germany) Nicolai Remberg	Adidas	HanseMerkur	Plan International
TSG Hoffenheim	(Austria) Christian Ilzer	(Germany) Oliver Baumann	Macron	SAP	ProMinent Group
1. FC Köln	(Germany) René Wagner	(Germany) Marvin Schwäbe	Adidas	REWE	DEVK
RB Leipzig	(Argentina) Martín Demichelis	(Germany) David Raum	Puma	Red Bull	IC Markets
Bayer Leverkusen	(Spain) Carles Martínez Novell	(Germany) Robert Andrich	New Balance	BarmeniaGothaer	Niedax
Mainz 05	(Switzerland) Urs Fischer	(Switzerland) Silvan Widmer	Jako	Kömmerling	iDM Wärmepumpen
Borussia Mönchengladbach	(Germany) Alexander Blessin	(Germany) Tim Kleindienst	Puma	Reuter Gruppe	Sonepar
Bayern Munich	(Belgium) Vincent Kompany	(Germany) Manuel Neuer	Adidas	Deutsche Telekom	Allianz / Audi (Note: In cup matches)
SC Paderborn	(Germany) Ralf Kettemann	(Germany) Felix Götze	Hummel	C. Hedenkamp	Mediacom GmbH
Schalke 04	(Austria) Miron Muslić	(Turkey) Kenan Karaman	Adidas	Beumer Group	Blåkläder
VfB Stuttgart	(Germany) Sebastian Hoeneß	(Germany) Deniz Undav	Jako	Landesbank Baden-Württemberg	None

=== Managerial changes ===
Team	Outgoing	Manner	Exit date		Position in table	Incoming	Incoming date		Ref.
Team	Outgoing	Manner	Announced on	Departed on	Position in table	Incoming	Announced on	Arrived on	Ref.
Union Berlin	(Germany) Marie-Louise Eta (interim)	End of caretaker spell	11 April 2026	30 June 2026	Pre-season	(Switzerland) Mauro Lustrinelli	21 May 2026	1 July 2026	
Eintracht Frankfurt	(Spain) Albert Riera	Mutual consent	17 May 2026		Pre-season	(Austria) Adi Hütter	31 May 2026	1 July 2026	
Bayer Leverkusen	(Denmark) Kasper Hjulmand	Sacked	4 June 2026		Pre-season	(Spain) Carles Martínez Novell	4 June 2026	1 July 2026	
RB Leipzig	(Germany) Ole Werner	Sacked	17 June 2026		Pre-season	(Argentina) Martín Demichelis	22 June 2026	1 July 2026	
Borussia Mönchengladbach	(Poland) Eugen Polanski	Sacked	13 September 2026		18th	(Germany) Jan-Moritz Lichte (interim)	13 September 2026		
Borussia Mönchengladbach	(Germany) Jan-Moritz Lichte (interim)	End of caretaker spell	22 September 2026		18th	(Germany) Alexander Blessin	22 September 2026	23 September 2026	

== League table ==
Pos	Team	Pld	W	D	L	GF	GA	GD	Pts	Qualification or relegation
1	Borussia Dortmund	10	7	3	0	17	7	+10	24	Qualification for the Champions League league phase
2	Bayern Munich	10	6	4	0	30	10	+20	22	Qualification for the Champions League league phase
3	SC Freiburg	10	7	1	2	21	10	+11	22	Qualification for the Champions League league phase
4	RB Leipzig	10	7	0	3	32	14	+18	21	Qualification for the Champions League league phase
5	Bayer Leverkusen	10	6	1	3	24	17	+7	19	Qualification for the Europa League league phase (Note: The 2026–27 DFB-Pokal winners also qualify for the Europa League league stage (or the sixth-placed team if the DFB-Pokal winners finish in the top five of the Bundesliga). If the DFB-Pokal winners finish in the top six of the Bundesliga, the Conference League spot will be passed to the seventh-placed team.)
6	Werder Bremen	10	5	3	2	21	15	+6	18	Qualification for the Conference League play-off round
7	Eintracht Frankfurt	10	4	3	3	16	20	−4	15	
8	VfB Stuttgart	10	4	1	5	15	15	0	13	
9	SV Elversberg	10	4	1	5	17	19	−2	13	
10	FC Augsburg	10	3	3	4	23	21	+2	12	
11	TSG Hoffenheim	10	4	0	6	16	18	−2	12	
12	Hamburger SV	10	4	0	6	10	24	−14	12	
13	Mainz 05	10	3	1	6	19	22	−3	10	
14	1. FC Köln	10	2	4	4	11	15	−4	10	
15	SC Paderborn	10	2	4	4	8	15	−7	10	
16	Schalke 04	10	1	4	5	5	11	−6	7	Qualification for the relegation play-offs
17	Union Berlin	10	1	4	5	8	26	−18	7	Relegation to 2. Bundesliga
18	Borussia Mönchengladbach	10	1	1	8	12	26	−14	4	Relegation to 2. Bundesliga

Updated to match(es) played on 22 November 2026. Source: Bundesliga
Rules for classification: 1) Points; 2) Goal difference; 3) Goals scored; 4) Head-to-head aggregate results; 5) Head-to-head away goals scored; 6) Away goals scored; 7) Play-off at neutral site.
(Rules 4–6 only apply after all home-and-away matches have been played between the tied teams. Rule 7 only applies after the completion of the season.)

== Results ==
Home \ Away	AUG	UNB	BRE	DOR	ELV	FRA	FRE	HAM	HOF	KÖL	LEI	LEV	MAI	MÖN	MUN	PAD	SCH	STU
FC Augsburg	—	1–1					1–2					2–2	3–1		2–2		3–0	
Union Berlin		—		0–0	1–0	3–3				1–1	1–5						1–3	
Werder Bremen	3–2		—					4–0	2–0		3–1					2–2		
Borussia Dortmund			2–2	—	2–1	1–0		2–0							a	3–0	a	
SV Elversberg	4–3				—		0–1					3–2	4–1		1–2			
Eintracht Frankfurt	1–4					—	2–2	3–1	1–0	1–0								
SC Freiburg		2–0	4–1				—							5–0	1–3		2–1	
Hamburger SV			a					—		2–1			0–5	3–1				1–0
TSG Hoffenheim				2–3				2–3	—			3–0					2–1	2–1
1. FC Köln			1–1						3–2	—		1–2		2–1			0–0	
RB Leipzig	5–2				4–0	6–0		5–0			—			3–0				
Bayer Leverkusen		4–0					2–1				2–0	—				4–0		2–4
Mainz 05			2–3			1–3						3–4	—		1–2	0–0		
Borussia Mönchengladbach				0–1	3–4				1–2	a			3–4	—		0–0		
Bayern Munich		7–0		2–2						1–1	6–1				—			5–1
SC Paderborn						2–2	0–1	1–0	3–1							—		0–2
Schalke 04				a	0–0						0–2		0–1		0–0		—	0–0
VfB Stuttgart			1–0	0–1						4–1				2–3				—

Updated to match(es) played on 22 November 2026. Source: Bundesliga
Legend: Blue = home team win; Yellow = draw; Red = away team win.
For upcoming matches, an "a" indicates there is an article about the rivalry between the two participants.

== Relegation play-offs ==
The relegation play-offs will take place on 27 May and 31 May 2027.

== Statistics ==
=== Top goalscorers ===
As of 22 November 2026

Rank	Player	Club	Goals
1	(Germany) Niclas Füllkrug	Werder Bremen	10
2	(Czech Republic) Patrik Schick	Bayer Leverkusen	9
3	(Austria) Michael Gregoritsch	FC Augsburg	7
4	(Germany) Jonathan Burkardt	Eintracht Frankfurt	6
4	(Germany) Younes Ebnoutalib	Eintracht Frankfurt	6
4	(France) Michael Olise	Bayern Munich	6
4	(Brazil) Rômulo	RB Leipzig	6
4	(Germany) Phillip Tietz	Mainz 05	6
9	(Bosnia and Herzegovina) Ermedin Demirović	VfB Stuttgart	5
9	(Croatia) Igor Matanović	SC Freiburg	5
9	(France) Christopher Nkunku	RB Leipzig	5
9	(Germany) Felix Nmecha	Borussia Dortmund	5
9	(Norway) Antonio Nusa	RB Leipzig	5
9	(Japan) Yuito Suzuki	SC Freiburg	5

=== Hat-tricks ===
Player	Club	Against	Result	Date
(Germany) Younes Ebnoutalib	Eintracht Frankfurt	Union Berlin	3–3 (A)	29 August 2026
(Japan) Yuito Suzuki	SC Freiburg	Werder Bremen	4–1 (H)	30 August 2026
(France) Michael Olise	Bayern Munich	Union Berlin	7–0 (H)	18 September 2026
(France) Christopher Nkunku	RB Leipzig	Eintracht Frankfurt	6–0 (H)	10 October 2026
(Colombia) Luis Díaz	Bayern Munich	RB Leipzig	6–1 (H)	17 October 2026

=== Clean sheets ===
As of "" November 2026

Rank	Player	Club	Clean sheets
1	(Switzerland) Gregor Kobel	Borussia Dortmund	6
2	(Germany) Mio Backhaus	SC Freiburg	4
2	(Germany) Loris Karius	Schalke 04	4
2	(Belgium) Maarten Vandevoordt	RB Leipzig	4
5	(Netherlands) Mark Flekken	Bayer Leverkusen	3
5	(Germany) Nahuel Noll	SC Paderborn	3
5	(Germany) Dennis Seimen	VfB Stuttgart	3
8	(Germany) Noah Atubolu	Eintracht Frankfurt	2
8	(Estonia) Karl Hein	Werder Bremen	2
8	(Germany) Manuel Neuer	Bayern Munich	2
8	(Denmark) Frederik Rönnow	Union Berlin	2
8	(Germany) Alexander Schwolow	Mainz 05	2

== Awards ==
=== Monthly awards ===
Month	Player of the Month		Rookie of the Month		Goal of the Month		Ref.
Month	Player	Club	Player	Club	Player	Club	Ref.
September	(France) Michael Olise	Bayern Munich	(Germany) Maurice Krattenmacher	SV Elversberg	(Germany) Felix Nmecha	Borussia Dortmund	
October	(Germany) Niclas Füllkrug	Werder Bremen	(France) Joane Gadou	Borussia Dortmund	(Switzerland) Miro Muheim	Hamburger SV	
