= Pimpong =

Pimpong is a Ghanaian surname. Notable people with the surname include:

- Malik Pimpong (born 2008), Danish footballer
- Razak Pimpong (born 1982), Ghanaian footballer
