= Iličević =

Iličević is a Croatian surname. Notable people with the surname include:

- Ivo Iličević (born 1986), German-Croatian footballer, uncle of Niko
- Niko Iličević (born 2010), German-Croatian footballer
