= Beumer =

Beumer may refer to:

== People ==
Beumer is a Dutch surname. Notable people with the name include:

- Antoinette Beumer (born 1962), Dutch film director
- Jürgen Marcus, (born Jürgen Beumer, 1948–2018), German singer
- Marcel Beumer (born 1969), Dutch track cyclist
- Marjolein Beumer (born 1966), Dutch actress
- Toos Beumer (born 1947), Dutch swimmer

== Companies ==
- Beumer Group, a logistics manufacturing company
