= 2023–24 AC Perugia Calcio season =

AC Perugia Calcio
2023–24 season
- Manager: Francesco Baldini
- Stadium: Stadio Renato Curi
- Serie C: 3rd
- Coppa Italia Serie C: Second round

The 2023–24 season is AC Perugia Calcio's 119th season in existence and first season back in the Serie C. They are also competing in the Coppa Italia Serie C.

== Players ==
=== First-team squad ===
As of 8 September 2023

Note: Flags indicate national team as defined under FIFA eligibility rules; some limited exceptions apply. Players may hold more than one non-FIFA nationality.

No.	Pos.	Nation	Player
1	GK	ALB	Alessio Abibi
3	DF	ITA	Damiano Cancellieri
4	MF	ITA	Edoardo Iannoni (on loan from Salernitana)
5	DF	ITA	Gabriele Angella (Vice-captain)
6	DF	CRO	Stipe Vulikić
7	DF	COL	Yeferson Paz (on loan from Sassuolo)
8	FW	ARG	Federico Vázquez
10	FW	BRA	Ryder Matos
11	FW	ITA	Alessandro Seghetti
12	GK	LTU	Marius Adamonis (on loan from Lazio)
14	FW	ITA	Daniel Bezziccheri
15	DF	ITA	Cristian Dell'Orco
16	MF	ITA	Paolo Bartolomei
17	FW	GER	Younes Ebnoutalib
18	MF	ITA	Christian Acella (on loan from Cremonese)

No.	Pos.	Nation	Player
20	MF	ITA	Federico Ricci
21	MF	ITA	Nicolò Cudrig (on loan from Juventus)
22	GK	ITA	Jacopo Furlan
23	MF	ITA	Francesco Lisi
24	MF	ITA	Emanuele Torrasi
25	DF	ITA	Raul Morichelli
26	MF	ITA	Simone Santoro
28	MF	CIV	Christian Kouan
71	DF	ITA	Andrea Bozzolan (on loan from AC Milan)
77	MF	BUL	Dzhaner Sadetinov
84	FW	LTU	Adrian Lickūnas
86	MF	ITA	Giovanni Giunti
94	DF	ITA	Francesco Mezzoni (on loan from Napoli)
95	DF	ITA	Giovanni Cicioni
96	DF	ITA	Matteo Viti

=== Out on loan ===
Note: Flags indicate national team as defined under FIFA eligibility rules; some limited exceptions apply. Players may hold more than one non-FIFA nationality.

No.	Pos.	Nation	Player
—	GK	ITA	Luca Moro (at Piacenza until 30 June 2024)

== Pre-season and friendlies ==
Win Draw Loss Fixtures

Friendly	(Italy)	v	(Italy)
--:-- CEST (UTC+2)

== Competitions ==
=== Overall record ===
Competition	First match	Last match	Starting round	Record							
Competition	First match	Last match	Starting round	Pld	W	D	L	GF	GA	GD	Win %
Serie C	1 September 2023	28 April 2024	Matchday 1	11	5	6	0	14	7	+7	45.45
Coppa Italia Serie C	5 October 2023		First round	1	1	0	0	3	1	+2	100.00
Total				12	6	6	0	17	8	+9	50.00

Last updated: 30 October 2023
Source: Soccerway

=== Serie C ===
==== League table ====
Pos	Team	Pld	W	D	L	GF	GA	GD	Pts	Qualification
2	Torres	38	22	9	7	56	38	+18	75	National play-offs 2nd round
3	Carrarese (O, P)	38	21	10	7	54	30	+24	73	National play-offs 1st round
4	Perugia	38	17	12	9	44	35	+9	63	Group play-offs 2nd round
5	Gubbio	38	16	11	11	50	38	+12	59	Group play-offs 1st round
6	Pescara	38	16	7	15	60	55	+5	55	Group play-offs 1st round

Updated to match(es) played on 28 April 2024. Source: Lega Pro, Soccerway (in English)
Rules for classification: 1) Points; 2) Head-to-head points; 3) Head-to-head goal difference; 4) Goal difference; 5) Goals scored; 6) Lower goals against; 7) Wins; 8) Lower losses; 9) Away wins; 10) Lower home losses.
(Note: Head-to-head record is used only after all the matches between the teams in question have been played)
(O) Play-off winners; (P) Promoted

==== Results summary ====
Overall								Home						Away					
Pld	W	D	L	GF	GA	GD	Pts	W	D	L	GF	GA	GD	W	D	L	GF	GA	GD
0	0	0	0	0	0	0	0	0	0	0	0	0	0	0	0	0	0	0	0

Last updated: 30 October 2023.
Source: Worldfootball

==== Results by round ====
Round	1	2	3	4	5	6	7	8	9	10	11	12	13
Ground	A	H	A	H	A	H	A	H	A	A	H	A	H
Result	D	D	W	D	D	W	W	D	W	D	W		
Position	12	13	7	7	9	6	4	5	4	4	3		

Updated to match(es) played on 30 October 2023. Source: Worldfootball
A = Away; H = Home; W = Win; D = Draw; L = Loss

==== Matches ====
The league fixtures were unveiled on 7 August 2023.

1 September 2023 1	Lucchese	0–0	Perugia	Lucca
20:45 CEST (UTC+2)				Stadium: Stadio Porta Elisa

10 September 2023 2	Perugia	1–1	Pescara	Perugia
20:45 CEST (UTC+2)				Stadium: Stadio Renato Curi

15 September 2023 3	SPAL	1–2	Perugia	Ferrara
20:45 CEST (UTC+2)		Report		Stadium: Stadio Paolo Mazza; Referee: Niccolo Turrini

19 September 2023 4	Perugia	1–1	Pontedera	Perugia
20:45 CEST (UTC+2)				Stadium: Stadio Renato Curi

23 September 2023 5	Rimini	2–2	Perugia	Rimini
20:45 CEST (UTC+2)				Stadium: Stadio Romeo Neri

1 October 2023 6	Perugia	1–0	Sestri Levante	Perugia
18:30 CEST (UTC+2)				Stadium: Stadio Renato Curi

9 October 2023 7	Fermana	0–2	Perugia	Fermo
20:45 CEST (UTC+2)				Stadium: Stadio Bruno Recchioni

15 October 2023 8	Perugia	1–1	Torres	Perugia
14:00 CEST (UTC+2)				Stadium: Stadio Renato Curi

22 October 2023 9	Juventus Next Gen	0–2	Perugia	Alessandria
14:00 CEST (UTC+2)			Vázquez 45+1' (pen.); Kouan 51'	Stadium: Stadio Giuseppe Moccagatta

26 October 2023 10	Recanatese	0–0	Perugia	Recanati
20:45 CEST (UTC+2)				Stadium: Stadio Nicola Tubaldi

30 October 2023 11	Perugia	2–1	Virtus Entella	Perugia
20:45 CET (UTC+1)				Stadium: Stadio Renato Curi

5 November 2023 12	Ancona	2–1	Perugia	Ancona
20:45 CET (UTC+1)				Stadium: Stadio del Conero

12 November 2023 13	Perugia	1–0	Gubbio	Perugia
20:45 CET (UTC+1)				Stadium: Stadio Renato Curi

18 November 2023 14	Pineto	1–1	Perugia	Pescara
16:15 CET (UTC+1)	Gambale 90+3'		Seghetti 344'	Stadium: Stadio Adriatico; Referee: Stefano Nicolini

25 November 2023 15	Perugia	1–1	Carrarese	Perugia
				Stadium: Stadio Renato Curi

3 December 2023 16	Olbia	0–1	Perugia	Olbia
				Stadium: Stadio Bruno Nespoli

10 December 2023 17	Perugia	2–2	Vis Pesaro	Perugia
				Stadium: Stadio Renato Curi

18 December 2023 18	Arezzo	2–0	Perugia	Arezzo
				Stadium: Stadio Città di Arezzo

23 December 2023 19	Perugia	0–3	Cesena	Perugia
				Stadium: Stadio Renato Curi

7 January 2024 20	Perugia	3–0	Lucchese	Perugia
				Stadium: Stadio Renato Curi

15 January 2024 21	Pescara	0–1	Perugia	Pescara
				Stadium: Stadio Adriatico

21 January 2024 22	Perugia	3–1	SPAL	Perugia
				Stadium: Stadio Renato Curi

27 January 2024 23	Pontedera	2–3	Perugia	Pontedera

3 February 2024 24	Perugia	0–0	Rimini	Perugia
				Stadium: Stadio Renato Curi

9 February 2024 25	Sestri Levante	1–0	Perugia	Sestri Levante

14 February 2024 26	Perugia	1–0	Fermana	Perugia
				Stadium: Stadio Renato Curi

18 February 2024 27	Torres	1–0	Perugia	Sassari

25 February 2024 28	Perugia	2–0	Juventus Next Gen	Perugia
				Stadium: Stadio Renato Curi

2 March 2024 29	Perugia	1–0	Recanatese	Perugia
				Stadium: Stadio Renato Curi

=== Coppa Italia Serie C ===
5 October 2023 First round	Monterosi	1–3	Perugia	Teramo
16:15 CEST (UTC+2)				Stadium: Stadio Gaetano Bonolis

9 November 2023 Second round	Rimini	v	Perugia	Rimini
17:00 CET (UTC+1)				Stadium: Stadio Romeo Neri
