= Niclas Füllkrug =

German footballer (born 1993)

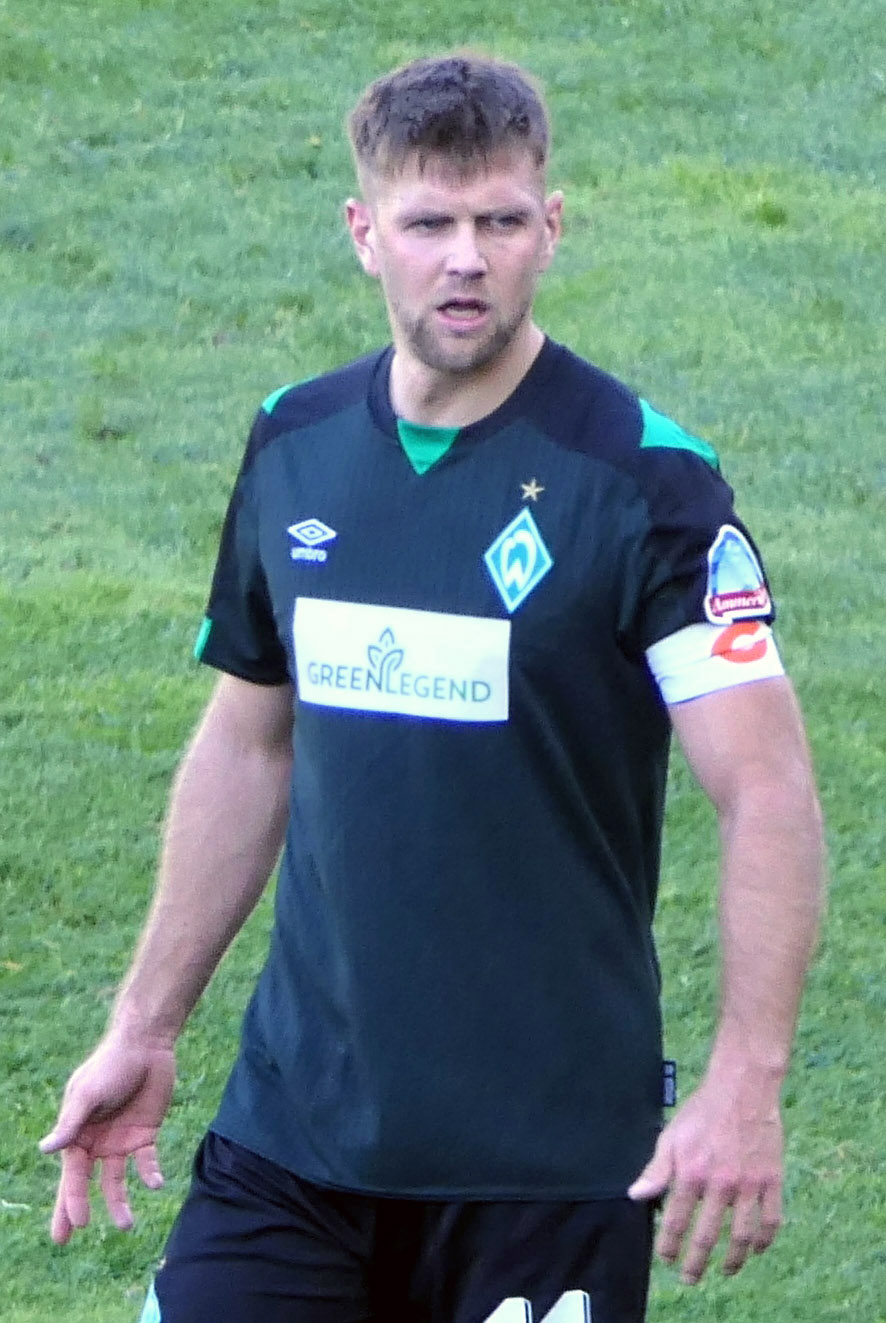
- Füllkrug with Werder Bremen in 2021

Personal information
- Full name: Niclas Füllkrug
- Date of birth: 9 February 1993 (age 33)
- Place of birth: Hanover, Germany
- Height: 1.89 m (6 ft 2 in)
- Position: Forward

Team information
- Current team: Werder Bremen (on loan from West Ham United)
- Number: 10

Youth career
- 1996–2005: TuS Ricklingen
- 2005–2006: Sportfreunde Ricklingen
- 2006–2012: Werder Bremen

Senior career*
Years	Team	Apps	(Gls)
2011–2014	Werder Bremen II	26	(10)
2012–2014	Werder Bremen	23	(2)
2013–2014	→ Greuther Fürth (loan)	21	(6)
2014–2016	1. FC Nürnberg	54	(17)
2016–2019	Hannover 96	75	(21)
2019–2023	Werder Bremen	90	(45)
2023–2024	Borussia Dortmund	29	(12)
2024–	West Ham United	26	(3)
2026	→ AC Milan (loan)	20	(1)
2026–	→ Werder Bremen (loan)	8	(9)

International career^{‡}
2010	Germany U18	1	(0)
2011–2012	Germany U19	7	(5)
2012–2014	Germany U20	9	(3)
2022–	Germany	25	(14)
- * Club domestic league appearances and goals as of 17:30, 31 October 2026 (UTC) ‡ National team caps and goals as of 21:56, 13 November 2026 (UTC)

Niclas Füllkrug (German pronunciation: [ˈnɪklas ˈfʏlkʁuːk]; born 9 February 1993) is a German professional footballer who plays as a forward for Bundesliga club Werder Bremen, on loan from EFL Championship club West Ham United, and the Germany national team.

A Werder Bremen youth star, Füllkrug started his senior career with the club's reserves. Following appearances with the first team in the Bundesliga and a loan to 2. Bundesliga side Greuther Fürth in the 2013–14 season, he moved to 1. FC Nürnberg. His performances at Nürnberg earned him a move to Hannover 96 in 2016. In April 2019, he returned to Werder Bremen for the 2019–20 season and played there for four seasons before joining Borussia Dortmund in 2023. After one season with Borussia Dortmund, he moved abroad for the first time, joining the English side West Ham United in 2024.

A former German youth international, he received a call-up to the Germany senior national team in November 2022, which he went on to represent at the 2022 FIFA World Cup and UEFA Euro 2024.

== Club career ==
=== Werder Bremen ===
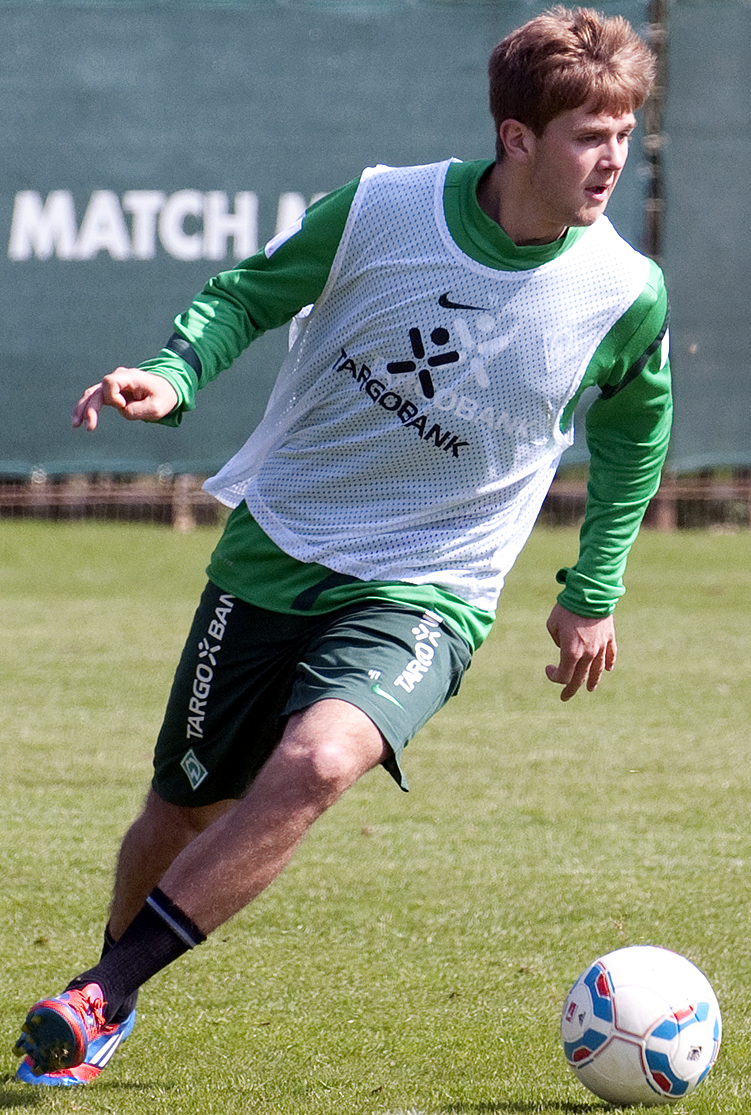
Füllkrug training with Werder Bremen in 2012

Füllkrug spent eight years with TuS Ricklingen in the Ricklingen district of Hanover, where he was coached by his father. During his time there he scored an average of 160 goals per season. When he joined Werder Bremen at the age of 14 in summer 2006, he rejected offers from five Bundesliga clubs, including Hannover 96.

Having progressed through Werder Bremen's youth system, Füllkrug began his senior career with the club's reserves.

==== Loan to Greuther Fürth ====
On 24 August 2013, he joined Greuther Fürth on a one-year loan deal. On 2 November 2013, he scored four goals including a 12-minute hat-trick for his new club during a spectacular 6–2 away win at Erzgebirge Aue. Having scored six goals in 18 appearances, he sustained a ligament rupture in his right ankle in a 2–0 win against VfL Bochum which was expected to keep him out of action for three to four weeks.

=== 1. FC Nürnberg ===
In 2014, Füllkrug joined 1. FC Nürnberg permanently having agreed a "long-term" contract, with a reported duration of three years. Werder Bremen secured an option to re-sign him for a fixed fee.

=== Hannover 96 ===
Füllkrug joined Hannover 96 on a four-year contract in July 2016. Nürnberg received a reported transfer fee of €2 million plus 1 million in possible bonuses.

He failed to score in his first eight Bundesliga appearances for Hannover 96 but hit a hat-trick against Mainz 05 on 13 January 2018 in a run of goals that got his name mentioned with a call up to the Germany national squad. He scored 14 goals in his first season with the club.

In summer 2018, Borussia Mönchengladbach offered €18 million for Füllkrug, and he also had offers from English clubs. However, Hannover decided to keep Füllkrug and in August it was announced that he had agreed to a contract extension until 2022.

On 30 September 2018, in a match against Eintracht Frankfurt, he was substituted off with an ankle injury, but was able to play in the following match, a 3–1 win against VfB Stuttgart which moved Hannover up from the last place in the league table. He also featured in a 2–2 away draw against Bayer Leverkusen and a 2–1 home defeat against FC Augsburg despite suffering from pain in his knee. He did not play in Hannover 96's loss in the second round of the DFB-Pokal on 30 October due to knee problems relating back to an injury sustained in 2013. Manager André Breitenreiter stated that the issue had been plaguing Füllkrug for years and that the pain was so severe before the cup match that Füllkrug did not feel "safe". After consulting a specialist Füllkrug returned to training on 20 November and started in four consecutive matches.

A few days after Füllkrug missed a match against SC Freiburg due to knee problems, it was announced that the injury was severe and he would likely be out for the rest of the season. The injury required surgery and was revealed to be cartilage damage to his right knee, the third injury of this kind of his career. He previously suffered cartilage damage at Werder Bremen (January 2013, right knee) and 1. FC Nürnberg (March 2015, left knee).

=== Return to Werder Bremen ===
In April 2019, it was announced Füllkrug would return to former club Werder Bremen for the 2019–20 season. There were conflicting reports of the fee paid to Hannover 96 with Deichstube reporting €6.3 million plus a possible 500,000 in bonuses and Sportbuzzer claiming 7 million. 1. FC Nürnberg also profited from the transfer through a 10% sell-on clause. Füllkrug suffered another knee injury in September 2019, and missed several months. He played only 11 games in his first season, scoring 4 goals.

On 26 September 2020, he scored his second Bundesliga hat-trick in a 3–1 away win against Schalke 04.

At the start of the 2021–22 season, Füllkrug lost his place to new signing Marvin Ducksch. However, once Ole Werner became coach, Füllkrug and Ducksch began playing together and formed an effective partnership. Füllkrug scored 19 goals in the 2. Bundesliga which helped his club to be promoted back to the Bundesliga. In the beginning of the 2022–23 Bundesliga, he scored 10 goals in 14 matches, which urged the Germany national coach Hansi Flick to call him up for the World Cup in November. He eventually managed to score 16 goals in that season to finish as joint top scorer along with Christopher Nkunku, making him the first top scorer to play for Bremen since Miroslav Klose in 2005–06.

=== Borussia Dortmund ===
On 31 August 2023, Bundesliga club Borussia Dortmund announced the signing of Füllkrug on a three-year contract, for a reported fee of €13 million + €2 million in add-ons.

On 29 September, he scored his first goal at the club in a 3–1 away win over Hoffenheim. On 7 November, he scored his first UEFA Champions League goal in a 2–0 victory over Newcastle United. On 28 January 2024, he netted his first hat-trick for the club, including two penalties, in a 3–1 victory over Bochum. He became the third player ever after Miroslav Klose and Mario Gómez to score hat-tricks for three different Bundesliga sides. On 17 April, he netted a goal to tie the game against Atlético Madrid and eventually help them progress to the semi-finals of the Champions League for the first time in eleven years. On 1 May, he scored the only goal in a 1–0 victory over Paris Saint-Germain in the Champions League semi-final first leg. In the final, he scored a header ruled-out by the VAR in a 2–0 loss to Real Madrid.

Füllkrug finished off fifth in the Bundesliga with his team. In his first and only season at the club, he played 43 matches, in which he was involved in 26 goals throughout all competitions.

=== West Ham United ===
On 5 August 2024, Füllkrug joined Premier League team West Ham United for a reported fee of £27 million on a four-year contract. On 17 August, he made his debut for the club, as a substitute, in a 2–1 loss against Aston Villa in the league.

On 3 December 2024, he scored his first goal for the club, a header, in a 3–1 loss to Leicester City, after having been injured for over two months. On 4 January 2025, he scored a goal against Manchester City in a 4–1 loss, shortly before suffering a further injury. On 5 April 2025, Füllkrug came on as a substitute for West Ham United and scored a header against Bournemouth, after having been injured again for just over three months. West Ham United resulted in a 2–2 draw against Bournemouth after trailing behind 1–0 at half time.

==== Loan to AC Milan ====
On 2 January 2026, Füllkrug moved to Italy and joined Serie A team AC Milan on loan for the remainder of the 2025–26 season, with a buy option included in the deal. He scored his first goal on 18 January in a 1–0 home victory against Lecce just three minutes after being substituted in.

==== Loan to Werder Bremen ====
On 18 August 2026, Füllkrug rejoined Werder Bremen on loan for the 2026–27 season. Four days later, he scored his first goal following his return from a penalty in a 3–0 away win over Lüneburger SK Hansa in the DFB-Pokal. On 24 October, Füllkrug scored his eighth goal in his seventh Bundesliga game of the season, setting a club record only Rudi Völler reached before. A week later, on 31 October, he would score his ninth goal in his eighth game in the row, breaking Völler’s record.

== International career ==
In November 2022, Füllkrug received his first call-up to the Germany national team by Hansi Flick for the FIFA World Cup 2022 in Qatar. He made his debut in a friendly match against Oman as a substitute and scored the winner in the process. Coincidentally, Füllkrug also became the oldest outfield player to make his debut for Germany in 20 years, aged 29 years and 280 days after Martin Max – who was 33 years and 253 days old when he made his debut for Germany in 2002.

On 27 November, he scored his first World Cup goal for Germany in a 1–1 draw against Spain. On 1 December, he scored a goal in a 4–2 win over Costa Rica. However, Germany was eliminated from the group stage as they finished third on goal difference.

Füllkrug was named in the Germany squad for UEFA Euro 2024 by Julian Nagelsmann. On 14 June 2024, he made his European Championship debut as a 63rd minute substitute and scored five minutes later as the tournament hosts beat Scotland 5–1 in the opening match of the tournament. On 23 June, Füllkrug scored a stoppage-time equaliser in a 1–1 draw against Switzerland in the last group stage match, securing his team's qualification to the knockout phase on top of their group.

On 7 September 2024, Füllkrug made his UEFA Nations League debut in Germany‘s opening group match against Hungary, scoring a goal in a 5–0 victory.

== Personal life ==
Füllkrug's nickname is "Lücke" (German for "gap") because of his front teeth. He has a wife named Lisa, and a daughter born in 2019. His sister, Anna-Lena, plays as a striker for Hannover 96, while his grandfather Gerd used to play for SV Arminia Hannover.

Following an accident at Werder Bremen's training ground he once ended up hospitalised with the tooth of his teammate wedged in his forehead.

== Career statistics ==
=== Club ===
As of match played 31 October 2026

Appearances and goals by club, season and competition
Club	Season	League			National cup (Note: Includes DFB-Pokal, FA Cup)		League cup (Note: Includes EFL Cup)		Europe		Other		Total	
Club	Season	Division	Apps	Goals	Apps	Goals	Apps	Goals	Apps	Goals	Apps	Goals	Apps	Goals
Werder Bremen II	2011–12	3. Liga	22	5	—		—		—		—		22	5
Werder Bremen II	2012–13	Regionalliga Nord	4	5	—		—		—		—		4	5
Werder Bremen II	Total		26	10	—		—		—		—		26	10
Werder Bremen	2011–12	Bundesliga	11	1	0	0	—		—		—		11	1
Werder Bremen	2012–13	Bundesliga	12	1	1	1	—		—		—		13	2
Werder Bremen	2013–14	Bundesliga	0	0	1	0	—		—		—		1	0
Werder Bremen	Total		23	2	2	1	—		—		—		25	3
Greuther Fürth (loan)	2013–14	2. Bundesliga	21	6	1	0	—		—		2 (Note: Appearances in Bundesliga relegation play-offs)	0	24	6
1. FC Nürnberg	2014–15	2. Bundesliga	24	3	1	0	—		—		—		25	3
1. FC Nürnberg	2015–16	2. Bundesliga	30	14	2	1	—		—		2	0	34	15
1. FC Nürnberg	Total		54	17	3	1	—		—		2	0	59	18
1. FC Nürnberg II	2015–16	Regionalliga Bayern	1	0	—		—		—		—		1	0
Hannover 96	2016–17	2. Bundesliga	27	5	2	0	—		—		—		29	5
Hannover 96	2017–18	Bundesliga	34	14	2	2	—		—		—		36	16
Hannover 96	2018–19	Bundesliga	14	2	1	1	—		—		—		15	3
Hannover 96	Total		75	21	5	3	—		—		—		80	24
Werder Bremen	2019–20	Bundesliga	8	4	1	0	—		—		2	0	11	4
Werder Bremen	2020–21	Bundesliga	19	6	2	0	—		—		—		21	6
Werder Bremen	2021–22	2. Bundesliga	33	19	1	0	—		—		—		34	19
Werder Bremen	2022–23	Bundesliga	28	16	2	0	—		—		—		30	16
Werder Bremen	2023–24	Bundesliga	2	0	1	1	—		—		—		3	1
Werder Bremen	Total		90	45	7	1	—		—		2	0	99	46
Borussia Dortmund	2023–24	Bundesliga	29	12	1	0	—		13 (Note: Appearances in UEFA Champions League)	3	—		43	15
West Ham United	2024–25	Premier League	18	3	1	0	1	0	—		—		20	3
West Ham United	2025–26	Premier League	8	0	—		1	0	—		—		9	0
West Ham United	Total		26	3	1	0	2	0	—		—		29	3
AC Milan (loan)	2025–26	Serie A	20	1	—		—		—		—		20	1
Werder Bremen (loan)	2026–27	Bundesliga	8	9	2	3	—		—		—		10	12
Career total			373	126	22	9	2	0	13	3	6	0	416	138

=== International ===
As of match played 13 November 2026

Appearances and goals by national team and year
National team	Year	Apps	Goals
Germany
Germany	2022	4	3
Germany	2023	9	7
Germany	2024	9	4
Germany	2025	2	0
Germany	2026	1	0
Total		25	14

Scores and results list Germany's goal tally first, score column indicates score after each Füllkrug goal.

List of international goals scored by Niclas Füllkrug
No.	Date	Venue	Cap	Opponent	Score	Result	Competition
1	16 November 2022	Sultan Qaboos Sports Complex, Muscat, Oman	1	Oman	1–0	1–0	Friendly
2	27 November 2022	Al Bayt Stadium, Al Khor, Qatar	3	Spain	1–1	1–1	2022 FIFA World Cup
3	1 December 2022	Al Bayt Stadium, Al Khor, Qatar	4	Costa Rica	4–2	4–2	2022 FIFA World Cup
4	25 March 2023	Mewa Arena, Mainz, Germany	5	Peru	1–0	2–0	Friendly
5	25 March 2023	Mewa Arena, Mainz, Germany	5	Peru	2–0	2–0	Friendly
6	28 March 2023	RheinEnergieStadion, Cologne, Germany	6	Belgium	1–2	2–3	Friendly
7	12 June 2023	Weserstadion, Bremen, Germany	7	Ukraine	1–0	3–3	Friendly
8	14 October 2023	Pratt & Whitney Stadium, East Hartford, United States	10	United States	2–1	3–1	Friendly
9	17 October 2023	Lincoln Financial Field, Philadelphia, United States	11	Mexico	2–2	2–2	Friendly
10	18 November 2023	Olympiastadion, Berlin, Germany	12	Turkey	2–2	2–3	Friendly
11	26 March 2024	Waldstadion, Frankfurt, Germany	15	Netherlands	2–1	2–1	Friendly
12	14 June 2024	Allianz Arena, Munich, Germany	17	Scotland	4–0	5–1	UEFA Euro 2024
13	23 June 2024	Waldstadion, Frankfurt, Germany	19	Switzerland	1–1	1–1	UEFA Euro 2024
14	7 September 2024	Merkur Spiel-Arena, Düsseldorf, Germany	22	Hungary	1–0	5–0	2024–25 UEFA Nations League A

== Honours ==
Borussia Dortmund

- UEFA Champions League runner-up: 2023–24

Individual

- Bundesliga Player of the Month: September 2022, October 2022, October 2026
- Bundesliga Team of the Season: 2022–23
- VDV Bundesliga Team of the Season: 2022–23
- Bundesliga top goalscorer: 2022–23
