= Otávio (footballer, born November 2005) =

Brazilian footballer

Otávio Galdino
Personal information
- Full name: Otávio Manoel Galdino Fernandes
- Date of birth: November 25, 2005 (age 20)
- Place of birth: Araucária, Brazil
- Height: 1.93 m (6 ft 4 in)
- Position: Centre-back

Team information
- Current team: Eintracht Frankfurt
- Number: 5

Youth career
- Atlético Matogrossense
- 2022–2024: Camboriú
- 2023–2024: → Botafogo (loan)

Senior career*
Years	Team	Apps	(Gls)
2023–2024	Camboriú	1	(0)
2024–2026	Estrela da Amadora	22	(0)
2026–	Eintracht Frankfurt	1	(0)
- * Club domestic league appearances and goals as of 17:26, 29 August 2026 (UTC)

Otávio Manoel Galdino Fernandes (born 25 November 2005), sometimes known simply as Otávio, is a Brazilian footballer who plays as a centre-back for the Bundesliga club Eintracht Frankfurt.

== Club career ==
Otávio is a product of the youth academies of the Brazilian clubs Atlético Matogrossense and Camboriú. On 31 July 2023, he joined Botafogo on a year-long loan, where he was assigned to their U20s.

He joined the U23 side of the Portuguese club Estrela da Amadora in 2024 where he became captain, and in 2025 was promoted to their senior team in the Primeira Liga. On 9 December 2025, he extended his contract with Estrela until 2029.

On 28 July 2026, he transferred to German Bundesliga club Eintracht Frankfurt, ahead of the 2026–27 season.

== Style of play ==
Otávio plays as a centre-back. He is left-footed.

== Career statistics ==
As of match played 29 August 2026

Appearances and goals by club, season and competition
Club	Season	League			National cup		Continental		Other		Total	
Club	Season	Division	Apps	Goals	Apps	Goals	Apps	Goals	Apps	Goals	Apps	Goals
Camboriú	2023	Série D	1	0	—		—		—		1	0
Estrela da Amadora	2025–26	Primeira Liga	22	0	—		—		—		22	0
Eintracht Frankfurt	2026–27	Bundesliga	1	0	1	0	—		—		2	0
Career total			24	0	1	0	0	0	0	0	25	0
