= Ayoube Amaimouni =

Moroccan footballer (born 2004)

Personal information
- Full name: Ayoube Amaimouni-Echghouyab
- Date of birth: 30 November 2004 (age 21)
- Place of birth: Vic, Spain
- Height: 1.78 m (5 ft 10 in)
- Position: Winger

Team information
- Current team: Eintracht Frankfurt
- Number: 29

Youth career
- CF Voltregà
- TuS Eving-Lindenhorst
- –2021: Rot-Weiss Essen
- 2021–2023: Arminia Bielefeld

Senior career*
Years	Team	Apps	(Gls)
2023–2024	SpVgg Erkenschwick	30	(18)
2024–2025	TSG Hoffenheim II	46	(16)
2026–	Eintracht Frankfurt	22	(2)

International career^{‡}
2026–	Morocco	4	(0)
- * Club domestic league appearances and goals as of 24 October 2026 ‡ National team caps and goals as of 19 June 2026

Ayoube Amaimouni-Echghouyabe (Arabic: أيوب أمايموني إشغوياب; born 30 November 2004) is a professional footballer who plays as a winger for Bundesliga club Eintracht Frankfurt. Born in Spain, he plays for the Morocco national team.

== Early life ==
Amaimouni-Echghouyabe was born on 30 November 2004 and is of Moroccan descent through his parents. Born in Vic, Spain, he grew up in the city.

== Club career ==
As a youth player, Amaimouni joined the academy of Spanish side CF Voltregà. Following his stint there, he joined the youth academy of German side TuS Eving-Lindenhorst. Subsequently, he joined the youth academy of German side Rot-Weiss Essen. Ahead of the 2021–22 season, he joined the youth academy of German side Arminia Bielefeld.

Two years later, he signed for fellow German side SpVgg Erkenschwick, where he made thirty league appearances and scored eighteen goals. During the summer of 2024, he signed for German side TSG Hoffenheim II, where he made forty-six league appearances and scored sixteen goals.

On 2 January 2026, he signed a five-and-a-half-year contract with German side Eintracht Frankfurt.

== International career ==
On 26 May 2026, Amaimouni was named in Morocco's 26-man squad for the 2026 FIFA World Cup.

== Career statistics ==
=== Club ===
As of match played 24 October 2026

Appearances and goals by club, season and competition
Club	Season	League			National cup		Europe		Other		Total	
Club	Season	Division	Apps	Goals	Apps	Goals	Apps	Goals	Apps	Goals	Apps	Goals
SpVgg Erkenschwick	2023–24	Oberliga Westfalen	30	18	0	0	—		3 (Note: Appearances in Westphalian Cup)	0	33	18
TSG Hoffenheim II	2024–25	Regionalliga Südwest	28	7	—		—		—		28	7
TSG Hoffenheim II	2025–26	3. Liga	18	9	—		—		—		18	9
TSG Hoffenheim II	Total		46	16	—		—		—		46	16
Eintracht Frankfurt	2025–26	Bundesliga	17	2	—		—		—		17	2
Eintracht Frankfurt	2026–27	Bundesliga	5	0	1	1	—		—		6	1
Eintracht Frankfurt	Total		22	2	1	1	—		—		23	3
Career total			98	36	1	1	0	0	3	0	102	37

=== International ===
As of match played 19 June 2026

Appearances and goals by national team and year
National team	Year	Apps	Goals
Morocco	2026	4	0
Total		4	0
