= Guillermo Balzi =

Argentine footballer (born 2001)

Personal information
- Date of birth: 23 July 2001 (age 25)
- Place of birth: Los Surgentes, Argentina
- Height: 1.75 m (5 ft 9 in)
- Position: Attacking midfielder

Team information
- Current team: Holstein Kiel
- Number: 8

Youth career
- Newell's Old Boys

Senior career*
Years	Team	Apps	(Gls)
2019–2023	Newell's Old Boys II		
2021–2026	Newell's Old Boys	34	(1)
2024–2026	→ Levadiakos (loan)	40	(5)
2026–	Holstein Kiel	0	(0)
- * Club domestic league appearances and goals as of 18 May 2026

Guillermo Balzi (born 23 July 2001) is an Argentine professional footballer who plays as an attacking midfielder for 2. Bundesliga club Holstein Kiel.

== Career ==
Balzi was born in Los Surgentes in the province of Córdoba. A Newell's Old Boys youth product, he made his first-team debut in 2021. When he started in an Argentine Primera División match against San Lorenzo in March 2026, coach Mauricio Larriera's decision to include him was labelled a "surprise" by Argentine newspaper La Capital, with Balzi having previously made just two appearances in the Copa Argentina in that season. Balzi sustained a hip injury in the match, forcing his substitution by Brian Aguirre after 25 minutes.

Balzi spent two seasons on loan with Super League Greece club Levadiakos, scoring 9 goals and making 14 assists in 61 appearances. At the end of the loan, Levadiakos declined the option to sign Balzi permanently for a fee of €1.3 million for 70% of his economic rights. While Balzi's contract with Newell's Old Boys was valid until December 2027, he was not in coach Frank Kudelka's plans.

Balzi joined 2. Bundesliga side Holstein Kiel in July 2026, having signed a contract until June 2029. Holstein Kiel reportedly paid Newell's Old Boys €550,000 for 70% of his economic rights.

== Style of play ==
A creative midfielder, Balzi is left-footed.

== Career statistics ==
As of match played 1 July 2026

Appearances and goals by club, season and competition
Club	Season	League			National cup (Note: Includes Copa Argentina, Greek Football Cup.)		League cup (Note: Includes Copa de la Liga Profesional.)		Continental		Other		Total	
Club	Season	Division	Apps	Goals	Apps	Goals	Apps	Goals	Apps	Goals	Apps	Goals	Apps	Goals
Newell's Old Boys	2021	Argentine Primera División	11	0	0	0	0	0	0	0	–		11	0
Newell's Old Boys	2022	Argentine Primera División	18	1	3	1	5	0	0	0	–		26	2
Newell's Old Boys	2023	Argentine Primera División	4	0	1	0	7	0	2 (Note: Appearances in Copa Sudamericana)	0	–		14	0
Newell's Old Boys	2024	Argentine Primera División	1	0	0	0	4	0	0	0	–		5	0
Newell's Old Boys	Total		34	1	4	1	16	0	2	0	0	0	56	2
Levadiakos (loan)	2024–25	Super League Greece	19	2	1	0	–		–		8 (Note: Appearances in Super League Greece relegation play-offs)	1	28	3
Levadiakos (loan)	2025–26	Super League Greece	21	3	7	3	–		–		5 (Note: Appearances in Super League Greece UEFA Conference League play-offs)	0	33	6
Levadiakos (loan)	Total		40	5	8	3	0	0	0	0	13	1	61	9
Holstein Kiel	2026–27	2. Bundesliga	0	0	0	0	0	0	0	0	0	0	0	0
Career total			74	6	12	4	16	0	2	0	13	1	117	11
