= Elias Baum =

German footballer (born 2005)

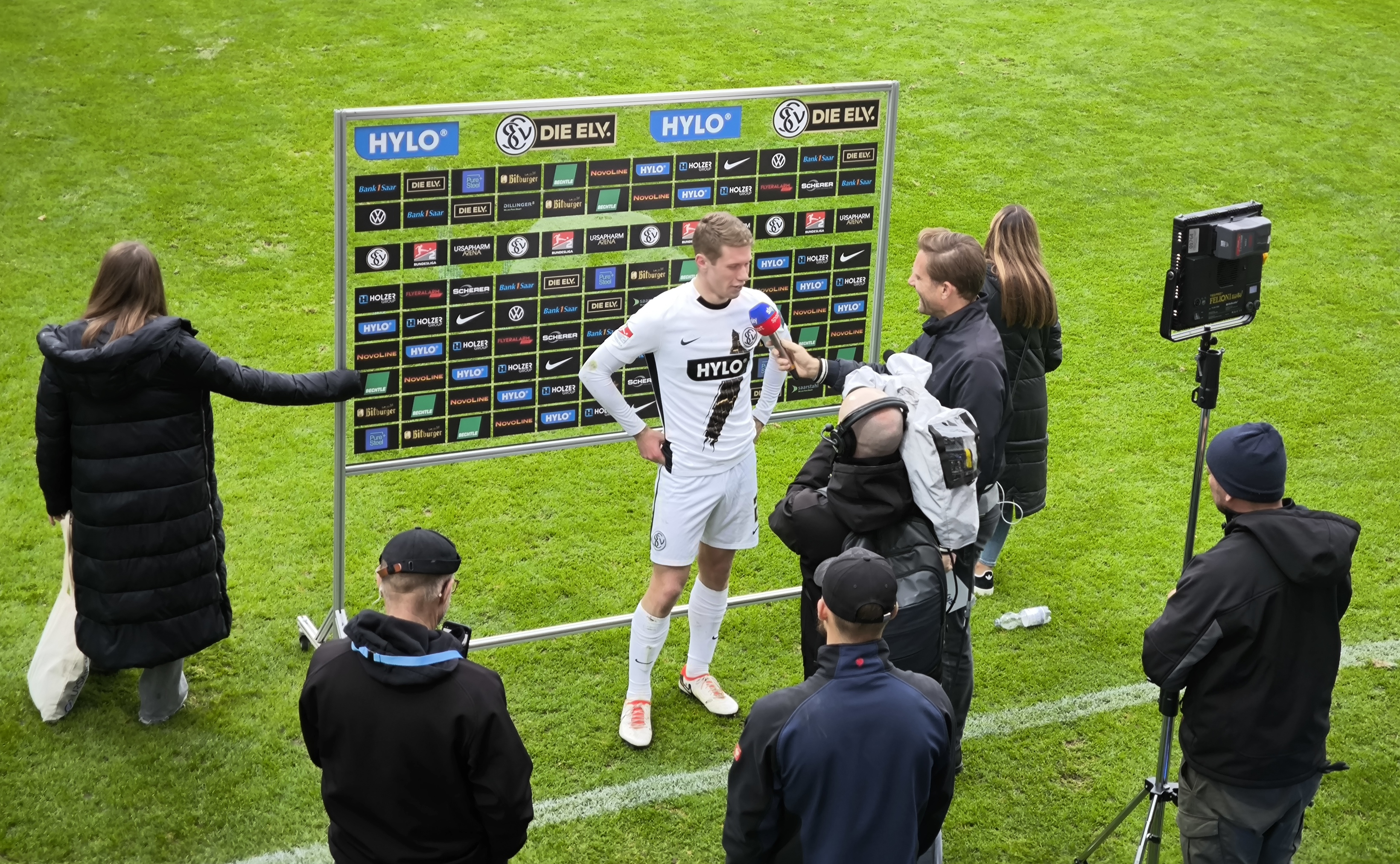
- Baum with SV Elversberg in 2024

Personal information
- Full name: Elias Niklas Baum
- Date of birth: 26 October 2005 (age 21)
- Place of birth: Frankfurt, Germany
- Height: 1.80 m (5 ft 11 in)
- Position: Right-back

Team information
- Current team: Eintracht Frankfurt
- Number: 2

Youth career
- –2015: FC 1957 Marxheim
- 2015–2023: Eintracht Frankfurt

Senior career*
Years	Team	Apps	(Gls)
2023–2024	Eintracht Frankfurt II	34	(1)
2023–	Eintracht Frankfurt	17	(0)
2024–2025	→ SV Elversberg (loan)	33	(3)

International career^{‡}
2021	Germany U17	2	(0)
2022–2023	Germany U18	7	(1)
2023–2024	Germany U19	11	(0)
2024–2025	Germany U20	7	(0)
2025–	Germany U21	8	(0)
Medal record
Men's football
Representing Germany
UEFA European Under-21 Championship
Runner-up	2025 Slovakia
- * Club domestic league appearances and goals as of 1 November 2026 ‡ National team caps and goals as of 20:35, 17 November 2026 (UTC)

Elias Niklas Baum (German pronunciation: [eˈliːas baʊ̯m]; born 26 October 2005) is a German professional footballer who plays as a right-back for Bundesliga club Eintracht Frankfurt.

== Club career ==
Baum started playing football at his youth club FC 1957 Marxheim and signed for the Eintracht Frankfurt academy in 2015. In December 2022 he signed a long-term professional contract.

The winger had been used at Eintracht Frankfurt reserves team since April 2023 that subsequently reached promotion from Hessenliga to Regionalliga Südwest.

On 9 November 2023, Baum debuted for the first squad in a 1–0 away victory at Finnish team HJK in the UEFA Conference League. On 9 December 2023, Baum had his first Bundesliga match, coming on as a substitute in a 5–1 home win against Bayern Munich.

For the 2024–25 season he was loaned to 2. Bundesliga side SV Elversberg.

== International career ==
In November 2021 Baum debuted for Germany's Under 17, and was capped another time. After seven caps for Germany U18 with one goal contribution he is part of the Germany U19 since September 2023.

== Career statistics ==
As of match played 1 November 2026

Appearances and goals by club, season and competition
Club	Season	League			Cup		Europe		Other		Total	
Club	Season	Division	Apps	Goals	Apps	Goals	Apps	Goals	Apps	Goals	Apps	Goals
Eintracht Frankfurt II	2022–23	Hessenliga	8	1	—		—		—		8	1
Eintracht Frankfurt II	2023–24	Regionalliga Südwest	26	1	—		—		—		26	1
Eintracht Frankfurt II	Total		34	1	—		—		—		34	1
Eintracht Frankfurt	2023–24	Bundesliga	4	0	0	0	2 (Note: Appearances in UEFA Conference League)	0	—		6	0
Eintracht Frankfurt	2025–26	Bundesliga	5	0	0	0	0	0	—		5	0
Eintracht Frankfurt	2026–27	Bundesliga	8	0	2	1	—		—		10	1
Eintracht Frankfurt	Total		17	0	2	1	2	0	—		21	1
SV Elversberg (loan)	2024–25	2. Bundesliga	33	3	2	0	—		2 (Note: Appearances in relegation play-offs)	0	37	3
Career total			84	4	4	1	2	0	2	0	92	5

== Honours ==
Eintracht Frankfurt II

- Hessenliga: 2022–23

Germany U21

- UEFA European Under-21 Championship runner-up: 2025

Individual

- Fritz Walter Medal U19 Bronze: 2024
