= Jeremiaha Maluze =

German footballer (born 2004)

Personal information
- Date of birth: 11 November 2004 (age 21)
- Place of birth: Duisburg, Germany
- Height: 1.93 m (6 ft 4 in)
- Positions: Centre-back; defensive midfielder

Team information
- Current team: Eintracht Frankfurt
- Number: 37

Youth career
- –2018: Rot-Weiß Oberhausen
- 2018–2019: FSV Duisburg
- 2019–2020: Croatia Mühlheim
- 2020–2021: KFC Uerdingen 05
- 2021–2022: SG Unterrath
- 2022–2023: MSV Duisburg

Senior career*
Years	Team	Apps	(Gls)
2023–2024	SV 19 Straelen	13	(0)
2024	Mülheimer FC 97	14	(4)
2024–2025	FC Rot-Weiß Erfurt	30	(4)
2025–	Eintracht Frankfurt II	26	(3)
2026–	Eintracht Frankfurt	1	(0)
- * Club domestic league appearances and goals as of 30 August 2026

Jeremiaha Maluze (born 11 November 2004) is a German professional footballer who plays as a centre-back for Bundesliga club Eintracht Frankfurt.

== Early life ==
Maluze was born to a German mother and a Nigerian father in Duisburg-Hochfeld.

== Club career ==
Maluze started playing football at his youth club Rot-Weiß Oberhausen. After further youth stints with FSV Duisburg, Croatia Mühlheim, SG Unterrath, KFC Uerdingen 05, and MSV Duisburg, Maluze started his senior career at SV 19 Straelen. After playing for Mülheimer FC 97 and FC Rot-Weiß Erfurt, Maluze joined the reserves team of Eintracht Frankfurt in 2025 and was promoted to the first team from 2026-27.

His contract was extended on 29 August 2026 through 2031.

== Honours ==
Eintracht Frankfurt II

- Hessenliga: 2025–26
