= Malik Pimpong =

Danish footballer (born 2008)

Personal information
- Full name: Malik Razak Engholm Pimpong
- Date of birth: 1 January 2008 (age 18)
- Place of birth: Denmark
- Height: 1.90 m (6 ft 3 in)
- Position: Forward

Team information
- Current team: Eintracht Frankfurt
- Number: 35

Youth career
- –2026: FC Midtjylland

Senior career*
Years	Team	Apps	(Gls)
2026–	Eintracht Frankfurt	2	(0)
2026–	Eintracht Frankfurt II	1	(1)

International career^{‡}
2024–2025	Denmark U17	13	(6)
2025	Denmark U18	8	(4)
2026–	Denmark U19	3	(2)
- * Club domestic league appearances and goals as of 6 September 2026 ‡ National team caps and goals as of 31 March 2026

Malik Razak Engholm Pimpong (born 1 January 2008) is a Danish professional footballer who plays as a forward for Bundesliga club Eintracht Frankfurt.

== Early life ==
Pimpong was born on 1 January 2008. Born in Denmark, he is the son of Ghana international Razak Pimpong.

== Club career ==
As a youth player, Pimpong joined the academy of Danish side FC Midtjylland, and in the 2025–26 season he became the top scorer of the U19 league with 20 goals in 26 appearances. Following his stint there, he signed for German side Eintracht Frankfurt ahead of the 2026–27 season.

== International career ==
Pimpong is a Denmark youth international. During the spring of 2026, he played for the Denmark national under-19 football team for 2026 UEFA European Under-19 Championship qualification.

== Style of play ==
Pimpong plays as a forward. Right-footed, he has received comparisons to France international Hugo Ekitike.

== Career statistics ==
As of match played 6 September 2026

Appearances and goals by club, season and competition
Club	Season	League			National cup		Europe		Other		Total	
Club	Season	Division	Apps	Goals	Apps	Goals	Apps	Goals	Apps	Goals	Apps	Goals
Eintracht Frankfurt	2026–27	Bundesliga	2	0	1	0	—		—		3	0
Eintracht Frankfurt II	2026–27	Regionalliga Südwest	1	1	—		—		—		1	1
Career total			3	1	1	0	0	0	0	0	4	1
