= Noah Atubolu =

German footballer (born 2002)

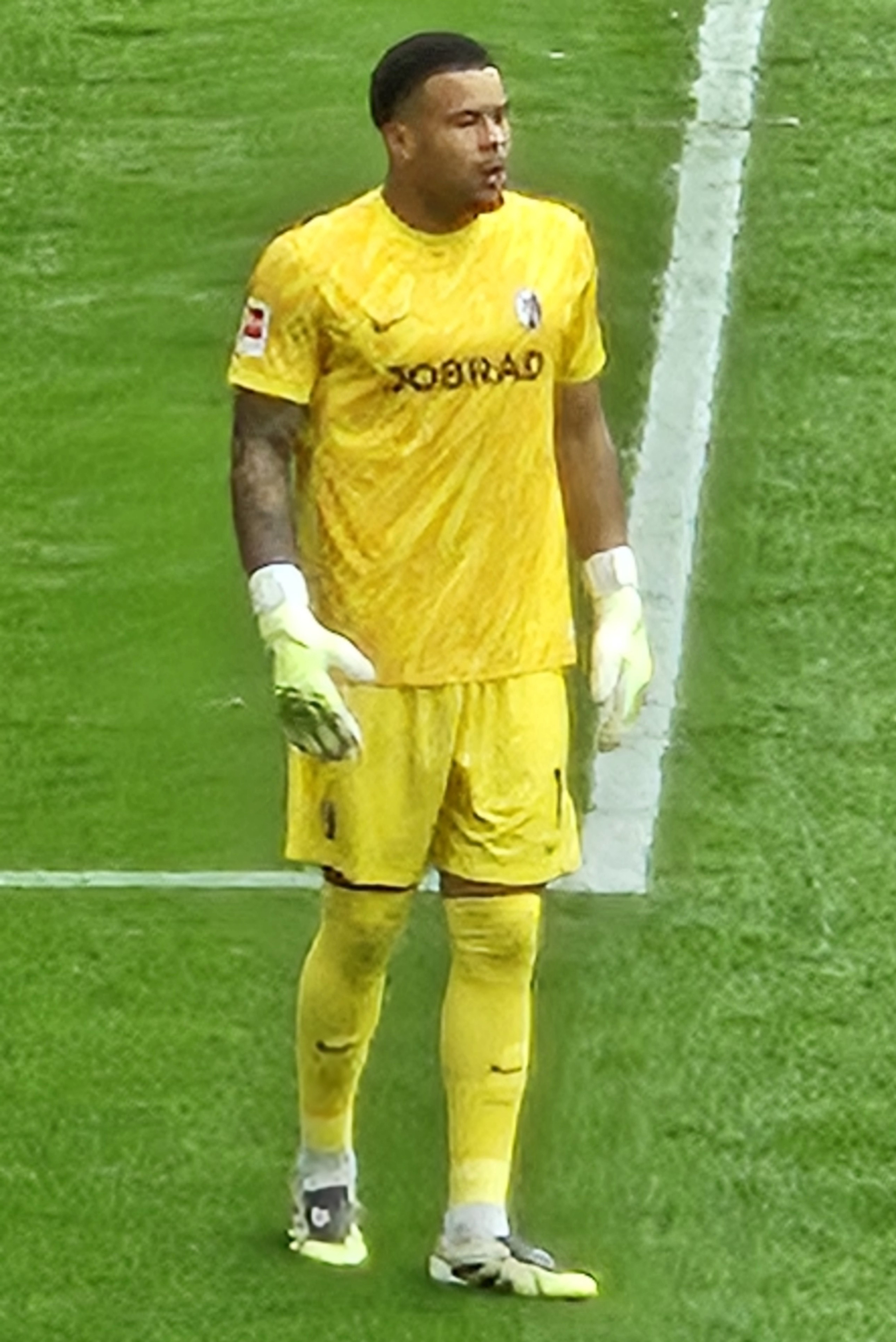
- Atubolu with SC Freiburg in 2025

Personal information
- Date of birth: 25 May 2002 (age 24)
- Place of birth: Freiburg im Breisgau, Germany
- Height: 1.90 m (6 ft 3 in)
- Position: Goalkeeper

Team information
- Current team: Eintracht Frankfurt (on loan from SC Freiburg)
- Number: 1

Youth career
- Freiburger FC
- –2015: SFE Freiburg
- 2015–2020: SC Freiburg

Senior career*
Years	Team	Apps	(Gls)
2020–2023	SC Freiburg II	81	(0)
2022–	SC Freiburg	94	(0)
2026–	→ Eintracht Frankfurt (loan)	8	(0)

International career^{‡}
2018–2019	Germany U17	7	(0)
2020	Germany U19	1	(0)
2021	Germany U20	2	(0)
2022–2025	Germany U21	22	(0)
Medal record
Men's football
Representing Germany
UEFA European Under-21 Championship
Runner-up	2025 Slovakia
- * Club domestic league appearances and goals as of 1 November 2026 ‡ National team caps and goals as of 09:43, 29 June 2025 (UTC)

Noah Atubolu (born 25 May 2002) is a German professional footballer who plays as a goalkeeper for Bundesliga club Eintracht Frankfurt, on loan from SC Freiburg.

== Club career ==
=== SC Freiburg ===
Atubolu grew up in Weingarten in the western part of Freiburg. He initially played as a centre-back and later as a goalkeeper in the academies of Freiburger FC and SFE Freiburg before joining the youth system of SC Freiburg.

Atubolu was first called up to Freiburg's under-19 side during the 2017–18 season and was part of the squad that won the DFB-Pokal der Junioren, although he did not make an appearance in that competition. In 2019 he was named captain of the under-19 team for one season, after which he was promoted to the reserve side SC Freiburg II. He became first-choice goalkeeper for Freiburg II in the Regionalliga and helped the team win promotion to the 3. Liga, where he made his professional league debut during the 2021–22 season. In parallel he was promoted to SC Freiburg's first-team squad in 2021 as third-choice goalkeeper behind Mark Flekken and Benjamin Uphoff.

Atubolu made his competitive debut for Freiburg's senior side in the second round of the 2022–23 DFB-Pokal, starting in a 2–1 home win after extra time against St. Pauli. He made his first European appearance later that campaign in a 1–1 away draw with Qarabağ in the UEFA Europa League group stage.

In July 2023, Freiburg announced that Atubolu had signed a contract extension ahead of the 2023–24 season. Following Flekken's departure he was given the number 1 shirt and installed as first-choice goalkeeper, with Florian Müller and Uphoff as his deputies. He made his Bundesliga debut on the opening matchday of 2023–24 in a 2–1 away win against TSG Hoffenheim, and kept his first Bundesliga clean sheet a week later in a 1–0 home victory over Werder Bremen. Atubolu played in all 34 league matches that season and made ten appearances in the Europa League as Freiburg reached the round of 16.

During the pre-season for the 2024–25 season Atubolu underwent an emergency appendectomy, which caused him to miss the start of the campaign; he returned to action on matchday three. Between a 2–1 home defeat by Bayern Munich on 25 January 2025 and a 2–2 draw with Mainz 05 on 15 March he went 609 minutes without conceding a goal in the Bundesliga, surpassing the previous club record of 510 minutes set by Richard Golz in the 2000–01 season. Despite his early-season absence he finished the 2024–25 season with 26 league appearances.

Across the 2023–24, 2024–25 and 2025–26 seasons Atubolu saved five consecutive penalties in the Bundesliga. He stopped spot kicks from Kevin Volland and Josip Juranović on matchday 34 of 2023–24 in a 2–1 away defeat to Union Berlin, from Florian Wirtz on matchday 15 of 2024–25 in a 5–1 away loss to Bayer Leverkusen, from André Silva on matchday 23 of the same season in a 5–0 home win against Werder Bremen, and from Romano Schmid on matchday 4 of 2025–26 in a 3–0 away win at Werder Bremen. According to Der Spiegel, this run made him the record holder for most consecutive penalties saved in the Bundesliga, surpassing Bernd Leno, Hans-Jörg Butt, Frank Rost and Thomas Zander, who had each saved four in a row.

==== Loan to Eintracht Frankfurt ====
On 28 August 2026, he joined fellow Bundesliga club Eintracht Frankfurt, on loan for the 2026–27 season, for an estimated €1 million fee and an obligation to make the deal permanent under certain conditions.

== International career ==
Starting in 2018, Atubolu moved through several of the DFB's youth national teams. He was first called up to the under-16s team that year, though he did not make an appearance in any of the matches. Later in 2018, he got playing time with the under-17s and went to the 2019 Euros as a backup goalkeeper for them, where he played in one match. Because of his family's Nigerian roots, Nigeria's football association tried to convince him to play for their team, but Atubolu chose to stay with the DFB.

At the end of 2021 he was first called up to the under-21s national team and made his debut for them in a Euros qualifier against Latvia in March 2022. Atubolu later became the team's starting goalkeeper at the 2023 under-21s Euros, where Germany was knocked out in the group stage. During the Euros 2025, he played his 21st match for the under-21s team in the semifinal against France, breaking Manuel Neuer's record for the most appearances in this team by a goalkeeper. His last under-21s match came in the tournament's final, where Germany lost to England after extra time. In October 2025, Atubolu received a late call-up to the first national team, replacing Oliver Baumann who was sick.

In September 2026, he was one of players who were called up with the Germany national team by head coach Jürgen Klopp for the 2026–27 UEFA Nations League matches against Netherlands, Greece, Serbia and Greece between 24 September and 4 October 2026.

== Other ==
In 2019, Atubolu completed his secondary school diploma and then did a voluntary social year (FSJ) in the department of "Social Engagement" at SC Freiburg. There, he worked as a coach for the "Füchsle Ballschulen", which is a programm named after SC Freiburg's mascot, a little fox, and run in cooperation with local primary schools to encourage children to be active through ball games. Atubolu is also involved in SC Freiburg's initiative "Sport-Quartiere Freiburg", which has the same goal of promoting physical activity among children.

== Career statistics ==
As of match played 1 November 2026

Appearances and goals by club, season and competition
Club	Season	League			DFB-Pokal		Continental		Other		Total	
Club	Season	Division	Apps	Goals	Apps	Goals	Apps	Goals	Apps	Goals	Apps	Goals
SC Freiburg II	2020–21	Regionalliga	25	0	—		—		—		25	0
SC Freiburg II	2021–22	3. Liga	31	0	—		—		—		31	0
SC Freiburg II	2022–23	3. Liga	25	0	—		—		—		25	0
SC Freiburg II	Total		81	0	—		—		—		81	0
SC Freiburg	2021–22	Bundesliga	0	0	0	0	—		—		0	0
SC Freiburg	2022–23	Bundesliga	0	0	2	0	1 (Note: Appearances in UEFA Europa League)	0	—		3	0
SC Freiburg	2023–24	Bundesliga	34	0	1	0	8	0	—		43	0
SC Freiburg	2024–25	Bundesliga	26	0	1	0	—		—		27	0
SC Freiburg	2025–26	Bundesliga	34	0	1	0	15	0	—		50	0
SC Freiburg	Total		94	0	5	0	24	0	—		123	0
Eintracht Frankfurt (loan)	2026–27	Bundesliga	8	0	1	0	—		—		9	0
Career total			183	0	6	0	24	0	0	0	213	0

== Honours ==
SC Freiburg

- UEFA Europa League runner-up: 2025–26

Germany U21

- UEFA European Under-21 Championship runner-up: 2025

Individual

- Fritz Walter Medal U19 Bronze: 2021
