= Niko Iličević =

German footballer (born 2010)

Personal information
- Date of birth: 31 October 2010 (age 16)
- Height: 1.75 m (5 ft 9 in)
- Position: Midfielder

Team information
- Current team: Eintracht Frankfurt
- Number: 23

Youth career
- –2018: VfR Goldbach
- 2018–: Eintracht Frankfurt

Senior career*
Years	Team	Apps	(Gls)
2026–	Eintracht Frankfurt	2	(0)

International career^{‡}
2025	Germany U15	2	(1)
2025–	Germany U16	7	(2)
2026–	Germany U17	3	(2)
- * Club domestic league appearances and goals as of 7 November 2026 ‡ National team caps and goals as of 4 October 2026

Niko Iličević (born 31 October 2010) is a German professional footballer who plays as a midfielder for Bundesliga club Eintracht Frankfurt.

== Club career ==
Iličević is a youth product of Eintracht Frankfurt, which he joined from the amateur club VfR Goldbach of Goldbach in 2019.

After spending the 2024–25 season as a leader with the under-17s, he first made headline in May 2025, after he made his unofficial debut during a set of friendlies, a 14–0 victory against FSV Geislitz and a 7–1 win to SC Weimar, scoring one goal in each game. But this put the club under investigation, as Iličević was only 14, too young to play a senior game in Germany. The club was eventually fined 20,000 Euro for this infraction

During the 2025–26 season, he established himself as a standout with Eintracht's under-19, in both the national league and UEFA Youth League. He scored his first goal in the latter on 9 December 2025, becoming the 4th youngest goal scorer in the competition's history.

Still aged only 15, with transfer rumours sparking, he started emerging as a potential Bundesliga player for the following season.

In July 2026, he signed his first professional contract with Eintracht Frankfurt. Later that year, on 1 November, Iličević made his professional debut for the club as a substitute in a 3–1 victory over Hamburger SV, becoming the youngest player to appear in the Bundesliga, alongside Youssoufa Moukoko, just one day after his 16th birthday.

== International career ==
Born in Germany, Iličević also holds Croatian citizenship. He is a youth international for Germany, having played for the under-15 and under-16, along the likes of fellow dual German-Croatian citizen Filip Pavić.

== Style of play ==
A left-footed attacking midfielder, Iličević is described as a playmaker, great at pushing his team forward through carries and passing, and at taking free kicks.

== Personal life ==
Niko Iličević is the nephew of German-born Croatian international Ivo Iličević.
