= Beumer Group =

Intralogistics System Manufacturer

- Type: GmbH & Co. KG
- Industry: Mechanics and Plant Engineering
- Founded: 1935
- Founder: Bernhard Beumer
- Headquarters: Beckum, Germany
- Area served: worldwide
- Key people: Rudolf Hausladen (Chairman); Norbert Hufnagel
- Number of employees: 5,600 (2023)
- Website: beumergroup.com

Beumer Group GmbH & Co. KG is a logistics manufacturer of based in Beckum, Germany. Products include conveyors, palletizers, packaging technology, sorters and distribution systems.

Bernhard Beumer founded the company in 1935. In 1977 Beumer expanded to the USA (Beumer Corporation), in 1983 to Australia (Beumer Australia, in Adelaide) and in 1993 to South America (Beumer Latinoamericana Equipamentos Ltda. in Campinas, Brazil). The company is headed by Christoph Beumer, grandson of Bernhard Beumer senior, since 2000. Crisplant, based in Aarhus, Denmark was absorbed into Beumer Group in 2016, following acquisition in 2009 from the previous owner Melrose Plc. In 2011, Beumer took over Enexco Teknologies India Limited. In May 2022, it was announced Beumer had acquired the Magdeburg-headquartered supplier of conveying systems and loading technology, FAM Minerals & Mining GmbH.
