= Younes Ebnoutalib =

German footballer (born 2003)

Personal information
- Date of birth: 13 September 2003 (age 23)
- Place of birth: Frankfurt, Germany
- Height: 1.91 m (6 ft 3 in)
- Position: Forward

Team information
- Current team: Eintracht Frankfurt
- Number: 11

Youth career
- SV 07 Heddernheim
- Rot-Weiss Frankfurt
- 2019–2020: Wehen Wiesbaden
- 2020–2022: Rot-Weiss Frankfurt

Senior career*
| Years | Team | Apps | (Gls) |
| 2022 | Rot-Weiss Frankfurt | 1 | (0) |
| 2022–2023 | Perugia | 1 | (0) |
| 2024–2025 | FC Gießen | 19 | (6) |
| 2025 | SV Elversberg | 21 | (12) |
| 2025– | Eintracht Frankfurt | 13 | (6) |

International career^{‡}
| 2018 | Morocco U15 | | |
| 2026– | Germany | 3 | (0) |
- * Club domestic league appearances and goals as of 19:31, 1 November 2026 (UTC) ‡ National team caps and goals as of 21:50, 16 November 2026 (UTC)

Younes Ebnoutalib (born 13 September 2003) is a German professional footballer who plays as a forward for Bundesliga club Eintracht Frankfurt and the Germany national team.

== Club career ==
Ebnoutalib is a product of the youth academies of the German clubs SV 07 Heddernheim, Rot-Weiss Frankfurt and Wehen Wiesbaden. He debuted with RW Frankfurt in the Verbandsliga Hessen-Süd in 2022. In 2022, he moved to the Italian club Perugia and made one appearance for them in the Serie C and two in Coppa Italia before terminating his contract in December 2023.

In the summer of 2024, he joined the Regionalliga side Gießen. On 19 December 2024, he signed a pre-contract with SV Elversberg starting 1 January 2025 in the 2. Bundesliga until 2028. He scored six goals in his first six games for Elversberg in the 2. Bundesliga in the 2025–26 season. He eventually managed to score 12 goals in 17 matches during the first half of that season.

On 29 December 2025, Ebnoutalib joined Bundesliga club Eintracht Frankfurt, signing a contract until June 2031, for a reported transfer fee of €8 million, which could rise to €10 million with add-ons. On 9 January 2026, he made his debut for the club, scoring a goal in a 3–3 draw with Borussia Dortmund. Later that year, on 29 August, he scored his first hat-trick in a 3–3 away draw with Union Berlin.

== International career ==
Eligible to represent both Germany and Morocco, Ebnoutalib played for Morocco's under-15 in 2018.

In September 2026, he was one of the players who were called up with the Germany national team by head coach Jürgen Klopp for the 2026–27 UEFA Nations League matches against Netherlands, Greece, Serbia and Greece between 24 September and 4 October 2026. Ebnoutalib made his debut on 24 September 2026 against the Netherlands.

== Personal life ==
Born in Germany, Ebnoutalib is of Moroccan descent, with roots in Segangan, a city in the province of Nador, Morocco. His father, Faissal Ebnoutalib, was a silver medalist in Taekwondo for Germany at the 2000 Summer Olympics.

== Career statistics ==
=== Club ===
As of match played 1 November 2026

Appearances and goals by club, season and competition
| Club | Season | League | | | National cup (Note: Includes Coppa Italia Serie C, Hessian Cup, DFB-Pokal) | | Europe | | Other | | Total | |
| Club | Season | Division | Apps | Goals | Apps | Goals | Apps | Goals | Apps | Goals | Apps | Goals |
|---|---|---|---|---|---|---|---|---|---|---|---|---|
| Rot-Weiss Frankfurt | 2021–22 | Verbandsliga Hessen-Süd | 1 | 0 | 0 | 0 | — | | — | | 1 | 0 |
| Perugia | 2022–23 | Serie C | 0 | 0 | 0 | 0 | — | | — | | 0 | 0 |
| Perugia | 2023–24 | Serie C | 1 | 0 | 2 | 0 | — | | — | | 3 | 0 |
| Perugia | Total | | 1 | 0 | 2 | 0 | — | | — | | 3 | 0 |
| FC Gießen | 2024–25 | Regionalliga Südwest | 19 | 6 | 1 | 0 | — | | — | | 20 | 6 |
| SV Elversberg | 2024–25 | 2. Bundesliga | 4 | 0 | — | | — | | 2 (Note: Appearances in 2. Bundesliga promotion play-offs) | 0 | 6 | 0 |
| SV Elversberg | 2025–26 | 2. Bundesliga | 17 | 12 | 2 | 0 | — | | — | | 19 | 12 |
| SV Elversberg | Total | | 21 | 12 | 2 | 0 | — | | 2 | 0 | 25 | 12 |
| Eintracht Frankfurt | 2025–26 | Bundesliga | 5 | 1 | — | | — | | — | | 5 | 1 |
| Eintracht Frankfurt | 2026–27 | Bundesliga | 8 | 5 | 2 | 2 | — | | — | | 10 | 7 |
| Eintracht Frankfurt | Total | | 13 | 6 | 2 | 2 | — | | — | | 15 | 8 |
| Career total | | | 55 | 24 | 7 | 2 | 0 | 0 | 2 | 0 | 64 | 26 |

=== International ===
As of match played 16 November 2026

Appearances and goals by national team and year
| National team | Year | Apps | Goals |
|---|---|---|---|
| Germany | 2026 | 3 | 0 |
| Total | | 3 | 0 |
