= Tripping.com =

Online search engine

- Company type: Subsidiary
- Website type: Online search engine and review aggregator
- Founded: San Francisco, California
- Services: Lodging; Hospitality; Homestay
- Parent: Hometogo
- Commercial: Yes
- Launched: 2009

Tripping.com, a subsidiary of HomeToGo, is an online search engine and review aggregator for vacation rentals. Tripping.com aggregates over 10 million listings in more than 150,000 cities worldwide and is based in San Francisco, California.

Tripping.com partners with and displays listings from booking websites including Booking.com, HomeAway, Vrbo, FlipKey, Roomorama, Interhome, Novasol, Wimdu, ZenRentals, Bedycasa, WayToStay, Gloveler, HolidayVelvet, 9flats, AlwaysOnVacation, RedAwning, and Housetrip. Users can search by price, ratings, location and features and amenities.

== History ==
Tripping.com was founded in 2009 by Nate Weisiger and Jen O’Neal, both former employees of StubHub, and Jeff Manheimer, a travel industry professional with experience at Hyatt and Travelzoo.

In 2012, Tripping.com entered into a business partnership with AARP.

=== Financing ===
In 2011, Quest Venture Partners invested $450,000 in Tripping.com, bringing total investment to over $1,000,000 in seed money and bringing Tripping.com out of beta version.

In 2012, Tripping.com became a metasearch engine for vacation rentals.

On May 19, 2014, the company closed its Series A round in the $5 million to $10 million range.

On July 28, 2015, the company closed its round of Series B funding at US$16 million. Steadfast Venture Capital led the round, which also included 7 Seas Venture Partners, Enspire Capital, Azure Capital, Fritz Demopoulos (founder of Qunar), Erik Blachford (former CEO of Expedia), Monte Koch, Drew Goldman, Brendan F. Wallace, Richard Chen, and former NFL athlete Shawntae Spencer.

In December 2016, the company raised $35 million in a Series C funding.

In December 2018, the company was acquired by Berlin-based Hometogo.

== See also ==
- Holiday cottage
- Vacation rental
