= 2024–25 Eintracht Frankfurt season =

Eintracht Frankfurt
2024–25 season
- President: Mathias Beck
- Chairmen: Markus Krösche; Axel Hellmann; Oliver Frankenbach (until 28 October); Julien Zamberk (since 29 October)
- Head coach: Dino Toppmöller
- Bundesliga: 3rd
- DFB-Pokal: Round of 16
- UEFA Europa League: Quarter-finals
- Top goalscorer: League: Hugo Ekitike; Omar Marmoush (15 each); All: Hugo Ekitike (22)
- Highest home attendance: 58,000, 21 September 2024 v Borussia Mönchengladbach (league)
- Lowest home attendance: 55,500, 23 January 2025 v Ferencváros (Europa League)
- Average home league attendance: 57,600 (league only)
Home colours	Away colours	Third colours

The 2024–25 season was the 125th season in the history of Eintracht Frankfurt, a football club based in Frankfurt, Germany. In addition to the domestic league, Eintracht Frankfurt also participated in this season's edition of the domestic cup, the DFB-Pokal, and the UEFA Europa League. This was the 100th season for Frankfurt in the Deutsche Bank Park, located in Frankfurt, Hesse, Germany. The season covers a period from 1 July 2024 to 30 June 2025.

== Players ==
=== First-team squad ===
As of 3 February 2025

Note: Flags indicate national team as defined under FIFA eligibility rules; some limited exceptions apply. Players may hold more than one non-FIFA nationality.

No.	Pos.	Nation	Player
1	GK	GER	Kevin Trapp (captain)
3	DF	BEL	Arthur Theate
4	DF	GER	Robin Koch
5	DF	SUI	Aurèle Amenda
6	MF	DEN	Oscar Højlund
8	FW	ALG	Farès Chaïbi
9	FW	CRO	Igor Matanović
11	FW	FRA	Hugo Ekitike
13	DF	DEN	Rasmus Kristensen (on loan from Leeds United)
15	MF	TUN	Ellyes Skhiri
16	MF	SWE	Hugo Larsson
17	FW	FRA	Elye Wahi
18	MF	SYR	Mahmoud Dahoud
19	FW	FRA	Jean-Mattéo Bahoya
20	MF	TUR	Can Uzun
21	DF	GER	Nathaniel Brown
22	DF	USA	Timothy Chandler

No.	Pos.	Nation	Player
23	MF	HUN	Krisztián Lisztes
26	MF	FRA	Éric Junior Dina Ebimbe
27	MF	GER	Mario Götze
28	MF	GER	Marcel Wenig
29	DF	FRA	Niels Nkounkou
30	FW	BEL	Michy Batshuayi
33	GK	GER	Jens Grahl
34	DF	GER	Nnamdi Collins
35	DF	BRA	Tuta
36	FW	GER	Ansgar Knauff
38	MF	GER	Ebu Bekir Is
40	GK	BRA	Kauã Santos
44	DF	ECU	Davis Bautista
45	MF	GER	Mehdi Loune
47	MF	HUN	Noah Fenyő

=== Players out on loan ===
Note: Flags indicate national team as defined under FIFA eligibility rules; some limited exceptions apply. Players may hold more than one non-FIFA nationality.

No.	Pos.	Nation	Player
—	GK	ALB	Simon Simoni (at 1. FC Kaiserslautern until 30 June 2025)
—	DF	GER	Elias Baum (at SV Elversberg until 30 June 2025)
—	DF	POR	Aurélio Buta (at Reims until 30 June 2025)
—	DF	CRO	Hrvoje Smolčić (at LASK until 30 June 2025)

No.	Pos.	Nation	Player
—	MF	USA	Paxten Aaronson (at Utrecht until 30 June 2025)
—	FW	ESP	Nacho Ferri (at Kortrijk until 30 June 2025)
—	FW	GER	Jessic Ngankam (at Hannover 96 until 30 June 2025)

== Transfers ==
=== In ===
No.	Pos.	Player	Transferred from	Fee	Date	Source
—	MF	(United States) Paxten Aaronson	(Netherlands) Vitesse	Loan return	1 July 2024	
49	FW	(Morocco) Anas Alaoui	(Germany) Eintracht Frankfurt academy	Free	1 July 2024	
32	FW	(Germany) Faride Alidou	(Germany) 1. FC Köln	Loan return	1 July 2024	
5	DF	(Switzerland) Aurèle Amenda	(Switzerland) Young Boys	€9.5M	1 July 2024	
48	FW	(Spain) Junior Awusi	(Germany) Eintracht Frankfurt academy	Free	1 July 2024	
21	DF	(Germany) Nathaniel Brown	(Germany) 1. FC Nürnberg	Loan return	1 July 2024	
—	MF	(Syria) Mahmoud Dahoud	(England) Brighton & Hove Albion	Loan	30 August 2024	
47	MF	(Hungary) Noah Fenyő	(Germany) Eintracht Frankfurt academy	Free	1 July 2024	
—	MF	(Cyprus) Antonio Foti	(Germany) Hannover 96	Loan return	1 July 2024	
28	MF	(Germany) Marcel Wenig	(Germany) 1. FC Nürnberg	Loan return	1 July 2024	
—	MF	(Croatia) Kristijan Jakić	(Germany) FC Augsburg	Loan return	1 July 2024	
4	DF	(Germany) Robin Koch	(England) Leeds United	Free transfer	1 July 2024	
13	DF	(Denmark) Rasmus Kristensen	(England) Leeds United	Loan	19 July 2024	
23	MF	(Hungary) Krisztián Lisztes	(Hungary) Ferencváros	€4.5M	1 July 2024	
9	FW	(Croatia) Igor Matanović	(Germany) Karlsruher SC	Loan return	1 July 2024	
—	FW	(Germany) Jessic Ngankam	(Germany) Mainz 05	Loan return	1 July 2024	
41	DF	(Cameroon) Jérôme Onguéné	(Switzerland) Servette	Loan return	1 July 2024	
3	DF	(Belgium) Arthur Theate	(France) Rennes	Loan	18 August 2024	
20	MF	(Turkey) Can Uzun	(Germany) 1. FC Nürnberg	€11M	2 July 2024	
6	MF	(Denmark) Oscar Højlund	(Denmark) Copenhagen	€1.35M	10 July 2024	
—	MF	(Norway) Jens Petter Hauge	(Norway) Bodø/Glimt	Loan return	1 January 2025	
17	FW	(France) Elye Wahi	(France) Marseille	€26M	24 January 2025	
38	MF	(Germany) Ebu Bekir Is	(Germany) Eintracht Frankfurt academy	Free	30 January 2025	
3	DF	(Belgium) Arthur Theate	(France) Rennes	€16M	2 February 2025	
30	FW	(Belgium) Michy Batshuayi	(Turkey) Galatasaray	€3M	3 February 2025	

=== Out ===
No.	Pos.	Player	Transferred to	Fee	Date	Source
—	MF	(United States) Paxten Aaronson	(Netherlands) Utrecht	Loan	1 July 2024	
32	FW	(Germany) Faride Alidou	(Italy) Hellas Verona	Loan	25 August 2024	
47	DF	(Germany) Elias Baum	(Germany) SV Elversberg	Loan	1 July 2024	
25	MF	(Netherlands) Donny van de Beek	(England) Manchester United	Loan return	1 July 2024	
24	DF	(Portugal) Aurélio Buta	(France) Reims	Loan	29 August 2024	
11	MF	(France) Hugo Ekitike	(France) Paris Saint-Germain	Loan return	1 July 2024	
48	FW	(Spain) Nacho Ferri	(Belgium) KV Kortrijk	Loan	1 July 2024	
—	MF	(Cyprus) Antonio Foti	(Germany) Borussia Dortmund II	€0.15M	1 July 2024	
43	FW	(Germany) Noel Futkeu	(Germany) Greuther Fürth	Undisclosed	1 July 2024	
46	DF	(Germany) Dario Gebuhr	(Germany) Hansa Rostock	€0.07M	1 July 2024	
20	MF	(Japan) Makoto Hasebe	Retired	N/A	1 July 2024	
—	MF	(Croatia) Kristijan Jakić	(Germany) FC Augsburg	€5M	1 July 2024	
9	MF	(Austria) Saša Kalajdžić	(England) Wolverhampton Wanderers	Loan return	1 July 2024	
4	DF	(Germany) Robin Koch	(England) Leeds United	Loan return	1 July 2024	
31	DF	(Germany) Philipp Max	(Greece) Panathinaikos	€1M	5 August 2024	
—	FW	(Germany) Jessic Ngankam	(Germany) Hannover 96	Loan	1 July 2024	
3	DF	(Ecuador) Willian Pacho	(France) Paris Saint-Germain	€40M	9 August 2024	
37	MF	(Germany) Sidney Raebiger	(Germany) Eintracht Braunschweig	€0.07M	1 July 2024	
17	MF	(Germany) Sebastian Rode	Retired	N/A	1 July 2024	
41	GK	(Albania) Simon Simoni	(Germany) FC Ingolstadt	Loan	1 July 2024	
5	DF	(Croatia) Hrvoje Smolčić	(Austria) LASK	Loan	1 July 2024	
—	DF	(Cameroon) Jérôme Onguéné	Contract terminated	Free	5 January 2025	
41	GK	(Albania) Simon Simoni	(Germany) 1. FC Kaiserslautern	Loan, previously loaned to FC Ingolstadt	14 January 2025	
—	MF	(Norway) Jens Petter Hauge	(Norway) Bodø/Glimt	€3.5M	16 January 2025	
7	FW	(Egypt) Omar Marmoush	(England) Manchester City	€75M	23 January 2025	
—	FW	(Germany) Faride Alidou	(Germany) 1. FC Kaiserslautern	Undisclosed	23 January 2025	

== Friendly matches ==
Win Draw Loss

20 July 2024 Friendly	TSV Heusenstamm (Germany)	0–12	(Germany) Eintracht Frankfurt	Heusenstamm, Germany
15:30 CEST (UTC+2)		Report	Götze 16'; Matanović 31', 38'; Marmoush 35'; Collins 46'; Skhiri 51'; Chaïbi 52', 77'; Larsson 54'; Uzun 57', 75', 77'	Stadium: Kultur- und Sportzentrum Martinsee; Attendance: 4,999

25 July 2024 Friendly	Juárez (Mexico)	1–2	(Germany) Eintracht Frankfurt	Ciudad Juárez, Mexico
19:30 MDT (UTC−6)	López 52'	Report	Brown (yellow card) 40'; Chaïbi 45' (pen.); Knauff 78'	Stadium: Estadio Olímpico Benito Juárez

30 July 2024 Friendly	Louisville City FC (United States)	0–4	(Germany) Eintracht Frankfurt	Louisville, United States
20:00 EDT (UTC−4)		Report	Ekitike 42'; Skhiri 47'; Matanović 49', 80'	Stadium: Lynn Family Stadium; Attendance: 10,218

7 August 2024 Friendly	Eintracht Frankfurt (Germany)	4–1	(Germany) TSV Steinbach Haiger	Frankfurt, Germany
	Ekitike; Dina Ebimbe; Buta; Skhiri	Report	Goal	Stadium: Deutsche Bank Park training pitch
Note: The match was played behind closed doors.

7 August 2024 Friendly	FSV Frankfurt (Germany)	2–5	(Germany) Eintracht Frankfurt	Frankfurt, Germany
18:00 CEST (UTC+2)	Sannomiya 59'; Iorga 66'	Report	Tuta 26'; Marmoush 29'; Matanović 34', 71'; Brown 40'	Stadium: PSD Bank Arena; Attendance: 10,175

10 August 2024 Orange Trophy	Valencia (Spain)	3–2	(Germany) Eintracht Frankfurt	Valencia, Spain
21:00 CEST (UTC+2)	Mir 4'; Duro 16'; Pepelu (penalty missed) 31'; Marí 88', (yellow card) 90+1'	Report	Marmoush 8' (pen.); Dina Ebimbe 72'; Nkounkou (yellow card) 90+1'	Stadium: Mestalla; Attendance: 25,000; Referee: José María Sánchez Martínez (Spain)

10 October 2024 Friendly	Eintracht Frankfurt (Germany)	3–1	Racing FC Union Luxembourg	Frankfurt, Germany
	Götze; Chaïbi; Uzun	Report	Goal	Stadium: Deutsche Bank Park training pitch
Note: The match was played behind closed doors.

5 January 2025 Friendly	Mainz 05 (Germany)	3–1	(Germany) Eintracht Frankfurt	Mainz, Germany
	Kohr 21', 56'; Mwene 42'	Report	Brown 57'	Stadium: Bruchwegstadion; Attendance: 0
Note: The match was played behind closed doors.

19 March 2025 Friendly	Eintracht Frankfurt (Germany)	0–1	(Germany) SG Sonnenhof Großaspach	Dreieich, Germany
19:00 CET (UTC+1)		Report	Celiktas 17'	Stadium: Ahorn Camp Sportpark Dreieich

20 May 2025 Friendly	FSV Geislitz (Germany)	0–14	(Germany) Eintracht Frankfurt	Linsengericht, Germany
18:00 CET (UTC+1)		Report	Wahi 10', 39'; Uzun 20', 81'; Matanović 30', 42'; Batshuayi 61', 83'; Prenaj 69', 73'; Yıldırım 58'; Trapp 67'; Iličević 89'; Chandler 90'	Stadium: Sportanlage Geislitz; Attendance: 2,500

21 May 2025 Friendly	SC 1903 Weimar (Germany)	1–7	(Germany) Eintracht Frankfurt	Weimar, Germany
18:00 CET (UTC+1)	Boden 76'		Matanović 5', 58'; Yıldırım 20'; Batshuayi 48'; Iličević 81'; Harangi 83'; Trapp 87'	Stadium: Stadion Lindenberg; Attendance: 5,000

== Competitions ==
Win Draw Loss

=== Overall record ===
Competition	First match	Last match	Starting round	Final position	Record							
Competition	First match	Last match	Starting round	Final position	Pld	W	D	L	GF	GA	GD	Win %
Bundesliga	24 August 2024	17 May 2025	Matchday 1	3rd	34	17	9	8	68	46	+22	50.00
DFB-Pokal	19 August 2024	4 December 2024	First round	Round of 16	3	2	0	1	6	5	+1	66.67
UEFA Europa League	26 September 2024	17 April 2025	League phase	Quarter-finals	12	7	2	3	21	14	+7	58.33
Total					49	26	11	12	95	65	+30	53.06

Source: Soccerway

=== Bundesliga ===
==== League table ====
Pos	Team	Pld	W	D	L	GF	GA	GD	Pts	Qualification or relegation
1	Bayern Munich (C)	34	25	7	2	99	32	+67	82	Qualification for the Champions League league phase
2	Bayer Leverkusen	34	19	12	3	72	43	+29	69	Qualification for the Champions League league phase
3	Eintracht Frankfurt	34	17	9	8	68	46	+22	60	Qualification for the Champions League league phase
4	Borussia Dortmund	34	17	6	11	71	51	+20	57	Qualification for the Champions League league phase
5	SC Freiburg	34	16	7	11	49	53	−4	55	Qualification for the Europa League league phase

Source: Bundesliga
Rules for classification: 1) Points; 2) Goal difference; 3) Goals scored; 4) Head-to-head results; 5) Head-to-head away goals scored; 6) Away goals scored; 7) Play-off.
(Rules 4–6 only apply after home and away matches have been played between the tied teams.)
(C) Champions

==== Results summary ====
Overall								Home						Away					
Pld	W	D	L	GF	GA	GD	Pts	W	D	L	GF	GA	GD	W	D	L	GF	GA	GD
34	17	9	8	68	46	+22	60	10	4	3	41	22	+19	7	5	5	27	24	+3

Source: Bundesliga

==== Results by round ====
Round	1	2	3	4	5	6	7	8	9	10	11	12	13	14	15	16	17	18	19	20	21	22	23	24	25	26	27	28	29	30	31	32	33	34
Ground	A	H	A	H	A	H	A	A	H	A	H	A	H	A	H	A	H	H	A	H	A	H	A	H	H	A	H	A	H	A	H	A	H	A
Result	L	W	W	W	W	D	L	D	W	W	W	W	D	L	L	W	W	W	D	D	D	W	L	L	L	W	W	L	W	D	W	D	D	W
Position	17	9	6	4	2	3	6	6	3	3	2	2	2	3	3	3	3	3	3	3	3	3	3	3	4	4	3	3	3	3	3	3	3	3

Source: DFB
A = Away; H = Home; W = Win; D = Draw; L = Loss

==== Matches ====
24 August 2024 1	Borussia Dortmund	2–0	Eintracht Frankfurt	Dortmund
18:30 CEST (UTC+2)	Gittens 72', 90+3'	Report	Skhiri (yellow card) 86'	Stadium: Westfalenstadion; Attendance: 81,365; Referee: Felix Zwayer

31 August 2024 2	Eintracht Frankfurt	3–1	TSG Hoffenheim	Frankfurt
15:30 CEST (UTC+2)	Ekitike 24'; Larsson 33'; Marmoush 56'	Report	Drexler (yellow card) 11'; Kramarić 54'; Micheler (yellow card) 64'; Akpoguma (yellow card) 72'	Stadium: Deutsche Bank Park; Attendance: 57,100; Referee: Florian Badstübner

14 September 2024 3	VfL Wolfsburg	1–2	Eintracht Frankfurt	Wolfsburg
15:30 CEST (UTC+2)	Baku 76'; Arnold (yellow card) 80'	Report	Skhiri (yellow card) 25'; Marmoush 30', 82' (pen.); Chaïbi (yellow card) 46'	Stadium: Volkswagen Arena; Attendance: 26,281; Referee: Harm Osmers

21 September 2024 4	Eintracht Frankfurt	2–0	Borussia Mönchengladbach	Frankfurt
18:30 CEST (UTC+2)	Larsson 31'; Theate (yellow card) 39'; Marmoush 80'	Report	Weigl (yellow card) 13'	Stadium: Deutsche Bank Park; Attendance: 58,000; Referee: Tobias Welz

29 September 2024 5	Holstein Kiel	2–4	Eintracht Frankfurt	Kiel
15:30 CEST (UTC+2)	Machino 31' (pen.), 50'; Porath (yellow card) 51'	Report	Marmoush 25', 65'; Amenda (yellow card) 35'; Matanović 47'; Koch (yellow card) 70'; Tuta 74'; Larsson (yellow card) 80'	Stadium: Holstein-Stadion; Attendance: 15,034; Referee: Tobias Stieler

6 October 2024 6	Eintracht Frankfurt	3–3	Bayern Munich	Frankfurt
17:30 CEST (UTC+2)	Marmoush 22', 90+4', (yellow card) 90+6'; Ekitike 35'	Report	Kim 15'; Upamecano 38'; Müller (yellow card) 43'; Olise 53'	Stadium: Deutsche Bank Park; Attendance: 58,000; Referee: Benjamin Brand

19 October 2024 7	Bayer Leverkusen	2–1	Eintracht Frankfurt	Leverkusen
15:30 CEST (UTC+2)	Boniface (penalty missed) 9', 72'; Andrich 25'; Grimaldo (yellow card) 67'; Hincapié (yellow card) 70'	Report	Marmoush 16' (pen.); Tuta (yellow card) 28'	Stadium: BayArena; Attendance: 30,210; Referee: Felix Brych

27 October 2024 8	Union Berlin	1–1	Eintracht Frankfurt	Berlin
17:30 CET (UTC+1)	Kemlein (yellow card) 30'; Leite (yellow card) 38'; Hollerbach 66'; Trimmel (yellow card) 84'; Vogt (yellow card) 87'; Schäfer (yellow card) 89'	Report	Gotze 14'; Theate (yellow card) 38'; Tuta (yellow card) 74' (yellow-red card) 77'	Stadium: Stadion An der Alten Försterei; Attendance: 22,012; Referee: Harm Osmers

2 November 2024 9	Eintracht Frankfurt	7–2	VfL Bochum	Frankfurt
15:30 CET (UTC+1)	Ekitike 9', 69'; Marmoush 18'; Knauff 20', (yellow card) 50'; Brown 32'; Dahoud 61'; Uzun 66'	Report	De Wit 35'; Ordets (yellow card) 38'; Hofmann 51', (yellow card) 77'	Stadium: Deutsche Bank Park; Attendance: 58,000; Referee: Daniel Schlager

10 November 2024 10	VfB Stuttgart	2–3	Eintracht Frankfurt	Stuttgart
17:30 CET (UTC+1)	Demirović (penalty missed) 22'; Chabot (yellow card) 57'; Vagnoman 86'; Millot (yellow card) 87'; Woltemade 90'	Report	Tuta (yellow card) 26'; Ekitike 45'; Brown 55'; Marmoush 62'; Chaïbi (yellow card) 90+2'	Stadium: MHPArena; Attendance: 60,000; Referee: Felix Zwayer

23 November 2024 11	Eintracht Frankfurt	1–0	Werder Bremen	Frankfurt
18:30 CET (UTC+1)	Götze 45'; Marmoush (yellow card) 56'; Skhiri (yellow card) 90+4'	Report	Köhn (yellow card) 27'; Lynen (yellow card) 54'	Stadium: Deutsche Bank Park; Attendance: 58,000; Referee: Florian Badstübner

1 December 2024 12	1. FC Heidenheim	0–4	Eintracht Frankfurt	Heidenheim
17:30 CET (UTC+1)		Report	Marmoush 22', 58'; Tuta (yellow card) 33'; Chaïbi 49'; Theate (yellow card) 90+3'; Ekitike 90+4'	Stadium: Voith-Arena; Attendance: 15,000; Referee: Florian Exner

7 December 2024 13	Eintracht Frankfurt	2–2	FC Augsburg	Frankfurt
15:30 CET (UTC+1)	Nkounkou (yellow card) 12'; Ekitike 55'; Uzun 74'; Koch (yellow card) 90+5'	Report	Schlotterbeck (yellow card) 1'; Tietz 60'; Essende 71'; Vargas (yellow card) 90+5'	Stadium: Deutsche Bank Park; Attendance: 57,000; Referee: Bastian Dankert

15 December 2024 14	RB Leipzig	2–1	Eintracht Frankfurt	Leipzig
19:30 CET (UTC+1)	Šeško 19'; Openda 51'; Orbán (yellow card) 70'	Report	Brown 40', (yellow card) 81'; Dahoud (yellow card) 50'; Knauff (yellow card) 68'	Stadium: Red Bull Arena; Attendance: 40,193; Referee: Benjamin Brand

21 December 2024 15	Eintracht Frankfurt	1–3	Mainz 05	Frankfurt
15:30 CET (UTC+1)	Bahoya (yellow card) 64'; Kristensen 75'	Report	Mwene (yellow card) 11'; Santos 15' (o.g.); Amiri (red card) 21'; Nebel 27', 58'	Stadium: Deutsche Bank Park; Attendance: 58,000; Referee: Florian Badstübner

11 January 2025 16	FC St. Pauli	0–1	Eintracht Frankfurt	Hamburg
15:30 CET (UTC+1)		Report	Koch (yellow card) 26'; Marmoush 32'; Collins (yellow card) 61'; Kristensen (yellow card) 90+5'	Stadium: Millerntor-Stadion; Attendance: 29,546; Referee: Harm Osmers

14 January 2025 17	Eintracht Frankfurt	4–1	SC Freiburg	Frankfurt
20:30 CET (UTC+1)	Koch 43'; Marmoush 65'; Ekitike 71'; Collins 81'; Skhiri (yellow card) 84'	Report	Ginter (yellow card) 28'; Dōan 37'	Stadium: Deutsche Bank Park; Attendance: 56,500; Referee: Sven Jablonski

17 January 2025 18	Eintracht Frankfurt	2–0	Borussia Dortmund	Frankfurt
20:30 CET (UTC+1)	Ekitike 18'; Højlund 90+2'	Report	Can (yellow card) 77'; Guirassy (yellow card) 78'	Stadium: Deutsche Bank Park; Attendance: 58,000; Referee: Daniel Schlager

26 January 2025 19	TSG Hoffenheim	2–2	Eintracht Frankfurt	Sinsheim
15:30 CET (UTC+1)	Chaves (yellow card) 58'; Orban 65'; Stach (yellow card) 83'; Hložek 90+5', (yellow card) 90+6'	Report	Ekitike 26' (pen.), 71'	Stadium: Rhein-Neckar-Arena; Attendance: 30,150; Referee: Sascha Stegemann

2 February 2025 20	Eintracht Frankfurt	1–1	VfL Wolfsburg	Frankfurt
15:30 CET (UTC+1)	Bahoya (yellow card) 72'; Uzun 81'	Report	Mæhle (yellow card) 45+1'; Tuta 50' (o.g.); Svanberg (yellow card) 71'; Gerhardt (yellow card) 90+7'	Stadium: Deutsche Bank Park; Attendance: 56,900; Referee: Benjamin Brand

8 February 2025 21	Borussia Mönchengladbach	1–1	Eintracht Frankfurt	Mönchengladbach
18:30 CET (UTC+1)	Kleindienst 26'; Itakura (yellow card) 42'; Ullrich (yellow card) 48'; Neuhaus (yellow card) 89'	Report	Ekitike 31'; Götze (yellow card) 33'; Batshuayi (yellow card) 42'; Uzun (yellow card) 81'	Stadium: Borussia-Park; Attendance: 54,042; Referee: Christian Dingert

16 February 2025 22	Eintracht Frankfurt	3–1	Holstein Kiel	Frankfurt
17:30 CET (UTC+1)	Larsson 18'; Tuta 37'; Ekitike (penalty missed) 45'; Uzun 60'; Dahoud (yellow card) 62'; Kristensen (yellow card) 85'	Report	Porath 73'	Stadium: Deutsche Bank Park; Attendance: 57,700; Referee: Robert Hartmann

23 February 2025 23	Bayern Munich	4–0	Eintracht Frankfurt	Munich
17:30 CET (UTC+1)	Olise 45+3'; Itō 61'; Sané (yellow card) 77'; Musiala 83'; Gnabry 90+2'	Report	Tuta (yellow card) 80'	Stadium: Allianz Arena; Attendance: 75,000; Referee: Sascha Stegemann

1 March 2025 24	Eintracht Frankfurt	1–4	Bayer Leverkusen	Frankfurt
18:30 CET (UTC+1)	Ekitike 37'; Skhiri (yellow card) 80'	Report	Tella 26'; Mukiele 29'; Schick 33'; García 62'; Xhaka (yellow card) 69'	Stadium: Deutsche Bank Park; Attendance: 58,000; Referee: Felix Zwayer

9 March 2025 25	Eintracht Frankfurt	1–2	Union Berlin	Frankfurt
15:30 CET (UTC+1)	Batshuayi 13'; Larsson (yellow card) 58'; Tuta (yellow card) 75'; Wahi (yellow card) 85'; Ekitike (penalty missed) 90+5'	Report	Querfeld 62'; Jeong 78'	Stadium: Deutsche Bank Park; Attendance: 58,000; Referee: Frank Willenborg

16 March 2025 26	VfL Bochum	1–3	Eintracht Frankfurt	Bochum
15:30 CET (UTC+1)	Krauß (yellow card) 24'; Holtmann 73'; Wittek (yellow card) 75'; Bero (yellow card) 85'; Sissoko (yellow card) 90+4'	Report	Kristensen 27'; Bahoya 32', (yellow card) 62'; Batshuayi 90+6'	Stadium: Ruhrstadion; Attendance: 26,000; Referee: Felix Zwayer

29 March 2025 27	Eintracht Frankfurt	1–0	VfB Stuttgart	Frankfurt
18:30 CET (UTC+1)	Tuta (yellow card) 19'; Götze 71'	Report	Millot (yellow card) 34'; Mittelstädt (yellow card) 49'; Al-Dakhil (red card) 58'; Stiller (yellow card) 90'	Stadium: Deutsche Bank Park; Attendance: 58,000; Referee: Deniz Aytekin

5 April 2025 28	Werder Bremen	2–0	Eintracht Frankfurt	Bremen
18:30 CEST (UTC+2)	Burke 28'; Pierper (yellow card) 45+1'; Stage (yellow card) 60'; Schmid 84'; Bittencourt (yellow card) 89'	Report	Tuta (yellow card) 34'; Skhiri (yellow card) 81'; Batshuayi (yellow card) 90'	Stadium: Weserstadion; Attendance: 42,000; Referee: Daniel Siebert

13 April 2025 29	Eintracht Frankfurt	3–0	1. FC Heidenheim	Frankfurt
17:30 CEST (UTC+2)	Bahoya 10'; Ekitike (yellow card) 30', (goal) 71'; Koch 42'	Report	Dorsch (yellow card) 30'	Stadium: Deutsche Bank Park; Attendance: 57,500; Referee: Timo Gerach

20 April 2025 30	FC Augsburg	0–0	Eintracht Frankfurt	Augsburg
15:30 CEST (UTC+2)	Onyeka (yellow card) 81'; Berisha (yellow card) 83'	Report	Collins (yellow card) 72'	Stadium: Augsburg Arena; Attendance: 30,660; Referee: Florian Badstübner

26 April 2025 31	Eintracht Frankfurt	4–0	RB Leipzig	Frankfurt
18:30 CEST (UTC+2)	Knauff 21', 53'; Collins (yellow card) 57'; Ekitike 67'; Koch 71'	Report	Raum (yellow card) 48'; Bitshiabu (red card) 50'; Klostermann (yellow card) 70'	Stadium: Deutsche Bank Park; Attendance: 56,500; Referee: Matthias Jöllenbeck

4 May 2025 32	Mainz 05	1–1	Eintracht Frankfurt	Mainz
19:30 CEST (UTC+2)	Burkardt 57'; Amiri (yellow card) 72'	Report	Kristensen 16'	Stadium: Mewa Arena; Attendance: 33,305; Referee: Martin Petersen

11 May 2025 33	Eintracht Frankfurt	2–2	FC St. Pauli	Frankfurt
17:30 CEST (UTC+2)	Kristensen 1'; Batshuayi 71'; Theate (yellow card) 84'; Kristensen (yellow card) 90+4'	Report	Saliakas 4'; Guilavogui 16'; Smith (yellow card) 78'; Voll (yellow card) 90+4'	Stadium: Deutsche Bank Park; Attendance: 58,000; Referee: Christian Dingert

17 May 2025 34	SC Freiburg	1–3	Eintracht Frankfurt	Freiburg
15:30 CEST (UTC+2)	Dōan 27'; Rosenfelder (yellow card) 58'; Lienhart (yellow card) 86'	Report	Kristensen (yellow card) 42', (goal) 61'; Knauff 45+4', (yellow card) 72'; Skhiri 63'; Collins (yellow card) 89'; Brown (yellow card) 90+6'	Stadium: Europa-Park Stadion; Attendance: 34,700; Referee: Benjamin Brand

=== DFB-Pokal ===
19 August 2024 First round	Eintracht Braunschweig	1–4	Eintracht Frankfurt	Braunschweig
20:45 CEST (UTC+2)	Kaufmann (yellow card) 30'; Bičakčić (yellow card) 43'; Köhler (yellow card) 58'; Szabó 89'	Report	Nkounkou (yellow card) 2'; Chaïbi 52'; Ekitike 56', 61'; Matanović 88'	Stadium: Eintracht-Stadion; Attendance: 21,201; Referee: Florian Exner

30 October 2024 Second round	Eintracht Frankfurt	2–1	Borussia Mönchengladbach	Frankfurt
18:00 CET (UTC+1)	Theate (red card) 15'; Ekitike 45+2'; Brown (yellow card) 52'; Marmoush 70'; Trapp (yellow card) 90+6'	Report	Itakura 47'; Ullrich (yellow card) 60'; Weigl (yellow card) 63'; Friedrich (yellow card) 80'; Čvančara (yellow card) 90+4'	Stadium: Deutsche Bank Park; Attendance: 58,000; Referee: Matthias Jöllenbeck

4 December 2024 Round of 16	RB Leipzig	3–0	Eintracht Frankfurt	Leipzig
20:45 CET (UTC+1)	Šeško 31'; Seiwald (yellow card) 45+2'; Openda 50', 58'	Report	Dahoud (yellow card) 87'	Stadium: Red Bull Arena; Attendance: 37,187; Referee: Sven Jablonski

=== UEFA Europa League ===
==== League phase ====
The draw for the league phase was held on 30 August 2024.

Pos	Team	Pld	W	D	L	GF	GA	GD	Pts	Qualification
3	(The Football Association) Manchester United	8	5	3	0	16	9	+7	18	Advance to round of 16 (seeded)
4	(The Football Association) Tottenham Hotspur	8	5	2	1	17	9	+8	17	Advance to round of 16 (seeded)
5	(German Football Association) Eintracht Frankfurt	8	5	1	2	14	10	+4	16	Advance to round of 16 (seeded)
6	(French Football Federation) Lyon	8	4	3	1	16	8	+8	15	Advance to round of 16 (seeded)
7	(Hellenic Football Federation) Olympiacos	8	4	3	1	9	3	+6	15	Advance to round of 16 (seeded)

Source: UEFA
Rules for classification: League phase tiebreakers

Round	1	2	3	4	5	6	7	8
Ground	H	A	H	H	A	A	H	A
Result	D	W	W	W	W	L	W	L
Position	15	7	6	4	3	5	2	5

Source: UEFA
A = Away; H = Home; W = Win; D = Draw; L = Loss

26 September 2024 1	Eintracht Frankfurt (Germany)	3–3	(Czech Republic) Viktoria Plzeň	Frankfurt, Germany
21:00 CEST (UTC+2)	Ekitike 38'; Dina Ebimbe 62'; Kristensen 67'	Report	Šulc 41'; Adu 86'; Jemelka 90+3'	Stadium: Waldstadion; Attendance: 56,500; Referee: Mykola Balakin (Ukraine)

3 October 2024 2	Beşiktaş (Turkey)	1–3	(Germany) Eintracht Frankfurt	Istanbul, Turkey
22:00 TRT (UTC+3)	Uduokhai (yellow card) 17'; Immobile (penalty missed) 27', (yellow card) 34'; Ndour (yellow card) 56'; Masuaku 90+3'	Report	Marmoush 19' (pen.); Dina Ebimbe 22'; Nkounkou (yellow card) 67'; Knauff 82'; Ekitike (yellow card) 90+2'	Stadium: Beşiktaş Stadium; Attendance: 35,305; Referee: John Beaton (Scotland)

24 October 2024 3	Eintracht Frankfurt (Germany)	1–0	(Latvia) RFS	Frankfurt, Germany
18:45 CEST (UTC+2)	Larsson 79', (yellow card) 86'	Report		Stadium: Waldstadion; Attendance: 56,600; Referee: Allard Lindhout (Netherlands)

7 November 2024 4	Eintracht Frankfurt (Germany)	1–0	(Czech Republic) Slavia Prague	Frankfurt, Germany
18:45 CET (UTC+1)	Marmoush 53'; Collins (yellow card) 66'; Matanović (yellow card) 84'; Dina Ebimbe (yellow card) 86'	Report	Jurásek (yellow card) 61'	Stadium: Waldstadion; Attendance: 57,350; Referee: Chris Kavanagh (England)

28 November 2024 5	Midtjylland (Denmark)	1–2	(Germany) Eintracht Frankfurt	Herning, Denmark
21:00 CET (UTC+1)	Bak Jensen (yellow card) 6'; Collins 48' (o.g.)	Report	Larsson 7'; Marmoush 57' (pen.)	Stadium: MCH Arena; Attendance: 9,521; Referee: Craig Pawson (England)

12 December 2024 6	Lyon (France)	3–2	(Germany) Eintracht Frankfurt	Décines-Charpieu, France
21:00 CET (UTC+1)	Cherki 27'; Fofana 50', (yellow card) 90+7'; Nuamah 54'; Lacazette (yellow card) 61'; Tagliafico (yellow card) 69'; Maitland-Niles (yellow card) 90'; Niakhaté (yellow card) 90+7'	Report	Nkounkou (yellow card) 13'; Knauff 18'; Koch (yellow card) 57'; Ekitike (yellow card) 74'; Marmoush (yellow card) 80', (goal) 85'; Kristensen (yellow card) 90'; Collins (yellow card) 90+3'; Skhiri (yellow card) 90+6'	Stadium: Parc Olympique Lyonnais; Attendance: 41,091; Referee: Andris Treimanis (Latvia)

23 January 2025 7	Eintracht Frankfurt (Germany)	2–0	(Hungary) Ferencváros	Frankfurt, Germany
21:00 CET (UTC+1)	Uzun 49'; Ekitike 59'; Koch (yellow card) 77'; Trapp (yellow card) 87'; Knauff (yellow card) 90+4'	Report		Stadium: Waldstadion; Attendance: 55,500; Referee: Enea Jorgji (Albania)

30 January 2025 8	Roma (Italy)	2–0	(Germany) Eintracht Frankfurt	Rome, Italy
21:00 CET (UTC+1)	Saelemaekers (yellow card) 6'; Angeliño 44'; Shomurodov 69'	Report		Stadium: Stadio Olimpico; Attendance: 64,458; Referee: Rade Obrenović (Slovenia)

==== Knockout phase ====
===== Round of 16 =====
The draw for the round of 16 was held on 21 February 2025.

6 March 2025 First leg	Ajax (Netherlands)	1–2	(Germany) Eintracht Frankfurt	Amsterdam, Netherlands
21:00 CET (UTC+1)	Brobbey 10'; Traoré (yellow card) 68'; Henderson (yellow card) 90'	Report	Larsson 27'; Skhiri (yellow card) 34', (goal) 70'; Collins (yellow card) 38'	Stadium: Johan Cruyff Arena; Attendance: 52,641; Referee: Simone Sozza (Italy)

13 March 2025 Second leg	Eintracht Frankfurt (Germany)	4–1 (6–2 agg.)	(Netherlands) Ajax	Frankfurt, Germany
18:45 CET (UTC+1)	Bahoya 7'; Götze 25', 82'; Ekitike 67'	Report	Taylor 78'	Stadium: Waldstadion; Attendance: 57,500; Referee: Irfan Peljto (Bosnia and Herzegovina)

===== Quarter-finals =====
The draw for the order of the quarter-final legs was held on 21 February 2025, after the draw for the round of 16.

10 April 2025 First leg	Tottenham Hotspur (England)	1–1	(Germany) Eintracht Frankfurt	London, England
20:00 BST (UTC+1)	Porro 26'; Tel (yellow card) 86'	Report	Ekitike 6'; Bahoya (yellow card) 62'; Kristensen (yellow card) 71'	Stadium: Tottenham Hotspur Stadium; Attendance: 57,849; Referee: Szymon Marciniak (Poland)

17 April 2025 Second leg	Eintracht Frankfurt (Germany)	0–1 (1–2 agg.)	(England) Tottenham Hotspur	Frankfurt, Germany
21:00 CEST (UTC+2)	Santos (yellow card) 42'; Kristensen (yellow card) 57'; Theate (yellow card) 90+6'	Report	Solanke 43' (pen.); Johnson (yellow card) 45+6'; Bentancur (yellow card) 79'; Romero (yellow card) 90+7'	Stadium: Waldstadion; Attendance: 57,500; Referee: Davide Massa (Italy)

== Statistics ==
=== Appearances and goals ===
No.	Pos	Nat	Player	Total		Bundesliga		DFB-Pokal		Europa League	
No.	Pos	Nat	Player	Apps	Goals	Apps	Goals	Apps	Goals	Apps	Goals
Goalkeepers
1	GK	(Germany) GER	Kevin Trapp	36	0	26	0	3	0	7	0
33	GK	(Germany) GER	Jens Grahl	0	0	0	0	0	0	0	0
40	GK	(Brazil) BRA	Kauã Santos	14	0	8+1	0	0	0	5	0
Defenders
3	DF	(Belgium) BEL	Arthur Theate	42	0	31	0	1	0	10	0
4	DF	(Germany) GER	Robin Koch	43	3	30	3	3	0	10	0
5	DF	(Cameroon) CMR	Aurèle Amenda	13	0	1+7	0	0+1	0	1+3	0
13	DF	(Denmark) DEN	Rasmus Kristensen	43	5	28+2	4	2	0	9+2	1
21	DF	(Germany) GER	Nathaniel Brown	33	3	22+4	3	2+1	0	3+1	0
22	DF	(United States) USA	Timothy Chandler	3	0	0+3	0	0	0	0	0
29	DF	(France) FRA	Niels Nkounkou	23	0	4+8	0	1+2	0	5+3	0
34	DF	(Germany) GER	Nnamdi Collins	32	1	15+9	1	1+1	0	4+2	0
35	DF	(Brazil) BRA	Tuta	44	2	26+4	2	3	0	11	0
44	DF	(Ecuador) ECU	Davis Bautista	0	0	0	0	0	0	0	0
Midfielders
6	MF	(Denmark) DEN	Oscar Højlund	22	1	7+13	1	0+2	0	0	0
8	MF	(Algeria) ALG	Farès Chaïbi	38	2	10+16	1	1+1	1	3+7	0
15	MF	(Tunisia) TUN	Ellyes Skhiri	46	1	27+4	1	3	0	7+5	0
16	MF	(Sweden) SWE	Hugo Larsson	47	5	28+5	3	3	0	9+2	2
18	MF	(Germany) GER	Mahmoud Dahoud	18	1	3+6	1	0+1	0	6+2	0
20	MF	(Turkey) TUR	Can Uzun	31	5	6+14	4	0+1	0	3+7	1
23	MF	(Hungary) HUN	Krisztián Lisztes	0	0	0	0	0	0	0	0
26	MF	(France) FRA	Éric Junior Dina Ebimbe	12	2	3+4	0	1	0	2+2	2
27	MF	(Germany) GER	Mario Götze	35	5	18+6	3	3	0	8	2
28	MF	(Germany) GER	Marcel Wenig	0	0	0	0	0	0	0	0
36	MF	(Germany) GER	Ansgar Knauff	44	6	18+12	4	0+3	0	7+4	2
38	MF	(Germany) GER	Ebu Bekir Is	1	0	0	0	0	0	0+1	0
45	MF	(Germany) GER	Mehdi Loune	0	0	0	0	0	0	0	0
47	MF	(Hungary) HUN	Noah Fenyő	0	0	0	0	0	0	0	0
49	MF	(Germany) GER	Harpreet Ghotra	0	0	0	0	0	0	0	0
Forwards
9	FW	(Croatia) CRO	Igor Matanović	24	2	2+14	1	1+1	1	3+3	0
11	FW	(France) FRA	Hugo Ekitike	48	22	31+2	15	3	3	9+3	4
17	FW	(France) FRA	Elye Wahi	11	0	1+7	0	0	0	0+3	0
19	FW	(France) FRA	Jean-Mattéo Bahoya	33	3	10+14	2	0	0	5+4	1
30	FW	(Belgium) BEL	Michy Batshuayi	11	3	3+7	3	0	0	0+1	0
48	FW	(Spain) ESP	Junior Awusi	0	0	0	0	0	0	0	0
49	FW	(Morocco) MAR	Anas Alaoui	0	0	0	0	0	0	0	0
Players transferred out during the season
7	FW	(Egypt) EGY	Omar Marmoush	26	20	17	15	2+1	1	5+1	4
41	DF	(Cameroon) CMR	Jérôme Onguéné	0	0	0	0	0	0	0	0

Last updated: 17 May 2025
Source: Competitions

=== Goalscorers ===
Rank	No.	Pos.	Nat.	Player	Bundesliga	DFB-Pokal	Europa League	Total
1	11	FW	(France)	Hugo Ekitike	15	3	4	22
2	7	FW	(Egypt)	Omar Marmoush	15	1	4	20
3	15	MF	(Sweden)	Hugo Larsson	3	0	3	6
3	13	DF	(Denmark)	Rasmus Kristensen	4	0	1	6
3	36	MF	(Germany)	Ansgar Knauff	4	0	2	6
6	20	MF	(Turkey)	Can Uzun	4	0	1	5
6	27	MF	(Germany)	Mario Götze	3	0	2	5
8	4	DF	(Germany)	Robin Koch	3	0	0	3
8	21	DF	(Germany)	Nathaniel Brown	3	0	0	3
10	8	MF	(Algeria)	Farès Chaïbi	1	1	0	2
10	9	FW	(Croatia)	Igor Matanović	1	1	0	2
10	15	MF	(Tunisia)	Ellyes Skhiri	1	0	1	2
10	19	MF	(France)	Jean-Mattéo Bahoya	2	0	1	3
10	26	MF	(France)	Éric Junior Dina Ebimbe	0	0	2	2
10	30	FW	(Belgium)	Michy Batshuayi	2	0	0	2
10	35	DF	(Brazil)	Tuta	2	0	0	2
17	6	MF	(Denmark)	Oscar Højlund	1	0	0	1
17	18	MF	(Germany)	Mahmoud Dahoud	1	0	0	1
17	34	DF	(Germany)	Nnamdi Collins	1	0	0	1
Totals					68	6	21	95

Last updated: 17 May 2025

=== Clean sheets ===
Rank	No.	Pos.	Nat.	Player	Bundesliga	DFB-Pokal	Europa League	Total
1	1	GK	(Germany)	Kevin Trapp	6	1	3	10
2	40	GK	(Brazil)	Kauã Santos	3	0	0	3
Totals					9	1	3	13

Last updated: 17 May 2025

=== Disciplinary record ===
No.	Pos.	Nat.	Player	Bundesliga			DFB-Pokal			Europa League			Total		
No.	Pos.	Nat.	Player	Yellow card	(yellow card) (yellow-red card)	Red card	Yellow card	(yellow card) (yellow-red card)	Red card	Yellow card	(yellow card) (yellow-red card)	Red card	Yellow card	(yellow card) (yellow-red card)	Red card
1	GK	(Germany)	Kevin Trapp	1	0	0	0	0	0	1	0	0	2	0	0
3	DF	(Belgium)	Arthur Theate	3	1	0	1	0	0	1	0	0	4	1	1
4	DF	(Germany)	Robin Koch	3	0	0	0	0	0	3	0	0	6	0	0
5	DF	(Switzerland)	Aurèle Amenda	1	0	0	0	0	0	0	0	0	1	0	0
7	FW	(Egypt)	Omar Marmoush	2	0	0	0	0	0	1	0	0	3	0	0
8	MF	(Algeria)	Farès Chaïbi	2	0	0	0	0	0	0	0	0	2	0	0
9	FW	(France)	Igor Matanović	0	0	0	0	0	0	1	0	0	1	0	0
11	FW	(France)	Hugo Ekitiké	1	0	0	0	0	0	2	0	0	3	0	0
13	DF	(Denmark)	Rasmus Kristensen	4	0	0	0	0	0	3	0	0	7	0	0
15	MF	(Tunisia)	Ellyes Skhiri	6	0	0	0	0	0	2	0	0	8	0	0
16	MF	(Sweden)	Hugo Larsson	2	0	0	0	0	0	1	0	0	3	0	0
17	FW	(France)	Elye Wahi	1	0	0	0	0	0	0	0	0	1	0	0
18	MF	(Germany)	Mahmoud Dahoud	2	0	0	1	0	0	0	0	0	3	0	0
19	FW	(France)	Jean-Mattéo Bahoya	3	0	0	0	0	0	1	0	0	4	0	0
20	MF	(Turkey)	Can Uzun	1	0	0	0	0	0	0	0	0	1	0	0
21	DF	(Germany)	Nathaniel Brown	2	0	0	0	0	0	0	0	0	2	0	0
26	MF	(France)	Éric Junior Dina Ebimbe	0	0	0	0	0	0	1	0	0	1	0	0
20	MF	(Turkey)	Can Uzun	1	0	0	0	0	0	0	0	0	1	0	0
29	DF	(France)	Niels Nkounkou	1	0	0	1	0	0	2	0	0	4	0	0
30	FW	(Belgium)	Michy Batshuayi	2	0	0	0	0	0	0	0	0	2	0	0
34	DF	(Germany)	Nnamdi Collins	4	0	0	0	0	0	3	0	0	7	0	0
35	DF	(Brazil)	Tuta	8	0	0	0	0	0	0	0	0	8	0	0
36	MF	(Germany)	Ansgar Knauff	3	0	0	0	0	0	0	0	0	3	0	0
40	GK	(Brazil)	Kauã Santos	0	0	0	0	0	0	1	0	0	1	0	0
Totals				49	1	0	4	0	1	23	0	0	77	1	1

Last updated: 17 May 2025
