= 2024–25 Bundesliga =

Bundesliga
- Season: 2024–25
- Dates: 23 August 2024 – 17 May 2025
- Champions: Bayern Munich; 33rd Bundesliga title 34th German title
- Relegated: Holstein Kiel; VfL Bochum
- Champions League: Bayern Munich; Bayer Leverkusen; Eintracht Frankfurt; Borussia Dortmund
- Europa League: SC Freiburg; VfB Stuttgart (as DFB-Pokal winners)
- Conference League: Mainz 05
- Matches: 306
- Goals: 959 (3.13 per match)
- Top goalscorer: Harry Kane (26 goals)
- Biggest home win: Dortmund 6–0 Berlin
- Biggest away win: Kiel 1–6 Munich; Bochum 0–5 Munich; Bremen 0–5 Munich
- Highest scoring: Frankfurt 7–2 Bochum
- Longest winning run: 8 games Leverkusen
- Longest unbeaten run: 22 games Leverkusen
- Longest winless run: 14 games Bochum
- Longest losing run: 7 games Heidenheim
- Highest attendance: 81,365 seventeen games
- Lowest attendance: 13,923; Kiel v Hoffenheim
- Attendance: 11,828,684 (38,656 per match)

The 2024–25 Bundesliga was the 62nd season of the Bundesliga, Germany's premier men's football competition. The season began on 23 August 2024 and concluded on 17 May 2025. Bayer Leverkusen were the defending champions.

On 4 May 2025, Bayern Munich were crowned Bundesliga champions for a record 33rd time (34th title overall) with two matches to spare following Bayer Leverkusen's 2–2 draw with SC Freiburg, reclaiming the league title after a third-place finish in the previous season.

== Season overview ==
The season began on 23 August 2024, and went into the winter break after the 15th matchday on 22 December. With the 16th matchday, the season continued on 10 January 2025. The final 34th matchday was scheduled for 17 May 2025.

The regular season was played as a round-robin tournament. Each team played a total of 34 matches, half at home and half away.

The fixtures were announced on 4 July 2024.

== Teams ==
Locations of the 2024–25 Bundesliga teams

A total of 18 teams participate in the 2024–25 edition of the Bundesliga, 16 of which competed in the league campaign during the previous season, while the remaining two were promoted from the 2. Bundesliga.

=== Team changes ===
Promoted from 2023–24 2. Bundesliga	Relegated from 2023–24 Bundesliga
FC St. Pauli; Holstein Kiel	1. FC Köln; Darmstadt 98

Holstein Kiel made its Bundesliga debut, making it the 58th different Bundesliga club and the first club from Schleswig-Holstein, and returning to the German top flight after 60 years of absence. The club also replaced Hansa Rostock as the northernmost club in league history.

FC St. Pauli returned to the Bundesliga after a thirteen-year absence. For the first time ever, FC St. Pauli plays in a season at a higher level than local rivals Hamburger SV.

=== Stadiums and locations ===
Team	Location	Stadium	Capacity	R.
FC Augsburg	Augsburg	WWK Arena	30,660	
Union Berlin	Berlin	Stadion An der Alten Försterei	22,012	
VfL Bochum	Bochum	Vonovia Ruhrstadion	26,000	
Werder Bremen	Bremen	Weserstadion	42,100	
Borussia Dortmund	Dortmund	Signal Iduna Park	81,365	
Eintracht Frankfurt	Frankfurt	Deutsche Bank Park	58,000	
SC Freiburg	Freiburg im Breisgau	Europa-Park Stadion	34,700	
1. FC Heidenheim	Heidenheim	Voith-Arena	15,000	
TSG Hoffenheim	Sinsheim	PreZero Arena	30,150	
Holstein Kiel	Kiel	Holstein-Stadion	15,034	
RB Leipzig	Leipzig	Red Bull Arena	47,800	
Bayer Leverkusen	Leverkusen	BayArena	30,210	
Mainz 05	Mainz	Mewa Arena	33,305	
Borussia Mönchengladbach	Mönchengladbach	Borussia-Park	54,042	
Bayern Munich	Munich	Allianz Arena	75,000	
FC St. Pauli	Hamburg	Millerntor-Stadion	29,546	
VfB Stuttgart	Stuttgart	MHPArena	60,058	
VfL Wolfsburg	Wolfsburg	Volkswagen Arena	28,917	

=== Personnel and kits ===
Team	Manager	Captain	Kit manufacturer	Shirt sponsor	
Team	Manager	Captain	Kit manufacturer	Front	Sleeve
FC Augsburg	(Denmark) Jess Thorup	(Netherlands) Jeffrey Gouweleeuw	Mizuno	WWK Versicherung	Siegmund
Union Berlin	(Germany) Steffen Baumgart	(Austria) Christopher Trimmel	Adidas	home to go_	JD Sports
VfL Bochum	(Germany) Dieter Hecking	(France) Anthony Losilla	Mizuno	Vonovia	MTEL Germany / Herbert Grönemeyer (in cup matches)
Werder Bremen	(Germany) Ole Werner	(Austria) Marco Friedl	Hummel	Matthäi	Ammerländer / HARALD PIHL (in cup matches)
Borussia Dortmund	(Croatia) Niko Kovač	(Germany) Emre Can	Puma	1&1 / Evonik (in cup and UEFA matches)	GLS Group / Pluto TV (in cup and UEFA matches)
Eintracht Frankfurt	(Germany) Dino Toppmöller	(Germany) Kevin Trapp	Nike	Indeed.com	Elotrans reload
SC Freiburg	(Germany) Julian Schuster	(Germany) Christian Günter	Nike	JobRad	Lexware
1. FC Heidenheim	(Germany) Frank Schmidt	(Germany) Patrick Mainka	Puma	MHP	Voith
TSG Hoffenheim	(Austria) Christian Ilzer	(Germany) Oliver Baumann	Joma	SAP	hep global
Holstein Kiel	(Germany) Marcel Rapp	(Germany) Lewis Holtby	Puma	Famila	Lotto Schleswig-Holstein
RB Leipzig	(Hungary) Zsolt Lőw	(Hungary) Willi Orbán	Puma	Red Bull	IHG Hotels & Resorts
Bayer Leverkusen	(Spain) Xabi Alonso	(Finland) Lukas Hradecky	Castore	Barmenia Versicherungen	Niedax / Talcid (in cup matches)
Mainz 05	(Denmark) Bo Henriksen	(Switzerland) Silvan Widmer	Jako	Kömmerling	iDM
Borussia Mönchengladbach	(Switzerland) Gerardo Seoane	(Switzerland) Jonas Omlin	Puma	Reuter Gruppe	Sonepar
Bayern Munich	(Belgium) Vincent Kompany	(Germany) Manuel Neuer	Adidas	Deutsche Telekom	Allianz / Audi (in cup and UEFA matches)
FC St. Pauli	(Germany) Alexander Blessin	(Australia) Jackson Irvine	Puma	Congstar	Astra Brauerei
VfB Stuttgart	(Germany) Sebastian Hoeneß	(Germany) Atakan Karazor	Jako	Winamax	hep solar
VfL Wolfsburg	(Germany) Daniel Bauer	(Germany) Maximilian Arnold	Nike	Volkswagen	Linglong Tire

=== Managerial changes ===
Team	Outgoing	Manner	Exit date		Position in table	Incoming	Incoming date		Ref.
Team	Outgoing	Manner	Announced on	Departed on	Position in table	Incoming	Announced on	Arrived on	Ref.
Bayern Munich	(Germany) Thomas Tuchel	Mutual consent	21 February 2024	30 June 2024	Pre-season	(Belgium) Vincent Kompany	29 May 2024	1 July 2024	
SC Freiburg	(Germany) Christian Streich	Mutual consent	18 March 2024	30 June 2024	Pre-season	(Germany) Julian Schuster	22 March 2024	1 July 2024	
VfL Bochum	(Germany) Heiko Butscher (interim)	End of caretaker spell	9 April 2024	30 June 2024	Pre-season	(Germany) Peter Zeidler	3 June 2024	1 July 2024	
Union Berlin	(Germany) Marco Grote (interim)	End of caretaker spell	6 May 2024	30 June 2024	Pre-season	(Denmark) Bo Svensson	23 May 2024	1 July 2024	
Borussia Dortmund	(Germany) Edin Terzić	Mutual consent	13 June 2024	30 June 2024	Pre-season	(Turkey) Nuri Şahin	14 June 2024	1 July 2024	
FC St. Pauli	(Germany) Fabian Hürzeler	Signed by Brighton & Hove Albion	15 June 2024	30 June 2024	Pre-season	(Germany) Alexander Blessin	27 June 2024	1 July 2024	
VfL Bochum	(Germany) Peter Zeidler	Sacked	20 October 2024		18th	(Germany) Markus Feldhoff (Switzerland) Murat Ural (interim)	21 October 2024		
VfL Bochum	(Germany) Markus Feldhoff (Switzerland) Murat Ural (interim)	End of caretaker	4 November 2024		18th	(Germany) Dieter Hecking	4 November 2024		
TSG Hoffenheim	(United States) Pellegrino Matarazzo	Sacked	11 November 2024		15th	(Austria) Christian Ilzer	15 November 2024		
Union Berlin	(Denmark) Bo Svensson	Sacked	27 December 2024		12th	(Germany) Steffen Baumgart	30 December 2024	2 January 2025	
Borussia Dortmund	(Turkey) Nuri Şahin	Sacked	22 January 2025		10th	(Denmark) Mike Tullberg (interim)	22 January 2025		
Borussia Dortmund	(Denmark) Mike Tullberg (interim)	End of caretaker spell	30 January 2025	2 February 2025	10th	(Croatia) Niko Kovač	30 January 2025	2 February 2025	
RB Leipzig	(Germany) Marco Rose	Sacked	30 March 2025		6th	(Hungary) Zsolt Lőw (interim)	30 March 2025		
VfL Wolfsburg	(Austria) Ralph Hasenhüttl	Sacked	4 May 2025		12th	(Germany) Daniel Bauer (interim)	4 May 2025		

== League table ==
Pos	Team	Pld	W	D	L	GF	GA	GD	Pts	Qualification or relegation
1	Bayern Munich (C)	34	25	7	2	99	32	+67	82	Qualification for the Champions League league phase
2	Bayer Leverkusen	34	19	12	3	72	43	+29	69	Qualification for the Champions League league phase
3	Eintracht Frankfurt	34	17	9	8	68	46	+22	60	Qualification for the Champions League league phase
4	Borussia Dortmund	34	17	6	11	71	51	+20	57	Qualification for the Champions League league phase
5	SC Freiburg	34	16	7	11	49	53	−4	55	Qualification for the Europa League league phase
6	Mainz 05	34	14	10	10	55	43	+12	52	Qualification for the Conference League play-off round
7	RB Leipzig	34	13	12	9	53	48	+5	51	
8	Werder Bremen	34	14	9	11	54	57	−3	51	
9	VfB Stuttgart	34	14	8	12	64	53	+11	50	Qualification for the Europa League league phase (Note: VfB Stuttgart qualified for the Europa League league phase by winning the 2024–25 DFB-Pokal.)
10	Borussia Mönchengladbach	34	13	6	15	55	57	−2	45	
11	VfL Wolfsburg	34	11	10	13	56	54	+2	43	
12	FC Augsburg	34	11	10	13	35	51	−16	43	
13	Union Berlin	34	10	10	14	35	51	−16	40	
14	FC St. Pauli	34	8	8	18	28	41	−13	32	
15	TSG Hoffenheim	34	7	11	16	46	68	−22	32	
16	1. FC Heidenheim (O)	34	8	5	21	37	64	−27	29	Qualification for the relegation play-offs
17	Holstein Kiel (R)	34	6	7	21	49	80	−31	25	Relegation to 2. Bundesliga
18	VfL Bochum (R)	34	6	7	21	33	67	−34	25	Relegation to 2. Bundesliga

Source: Bundesliga
Rules for classification: 1) Points; 2) Goal difference; 3) Goals scored; 4) Head-to-head results; 5) Head-to-head away goals scored; 6) Away goals scored; 7) Play-off.
(Rules 4–6 only apply after home and away matches have been played between the tied teams.)
(C) Champions; (O) Play-off winners; (R) Relegated
Notes:

Bayern de Munich VS st de pauli

== Results ==
Home \ Away	AUG	UNB	BOC	BRE	DOR	FRA	FRE	HEI	HOF	KIE	LEI	LEV	MAI	MÖN	MUN	STP	STU	WOL
FC Augsburg	—	1–2	1–0	2–2	2–1	0–0	0–0	2–1	0–0	1–3	0–0	0–2	2–3	2–1	1–3	3–1	0–1	1–0
Union Berlin	0–2	—	0–2 (Note: The match, originally ended in a 1–1 draw, was counted as a 2–0 win for Bochum after their goalkeeper Patrick Drewes was hit by a lighter, thrown by a fan and was unable to play on.)	2–2	2–1	1–1	0–0	0–3	2–1	0–1	0–0	1–2	2–1	1–2	1–1	1–0	4–4	1–0
VfL Bochum	1–2	1–1	—	0–1	2–0	1–3	0–1	2–0	0–1	2–2	3–3	1–1	1–4	0–2	0–5	1–0	0–4	1–3
Werder Bremen	0–2	4–1	1–0	—	0–0	2–0	0–1	3–3	1–3	2–1	0–0	2–2	1–0	2–4	0–5	0–0	2–2	1–2
Borussia Dortmund	0–1	6–0	4–2	2–2	—	2–0	4–0	4–2	1–1	3–0	2–1	2–3	3–1	3–2	1–1	2–1	1–2	4–0
Eintracht Frankfurt	2–2	1–2	7–2	1–0	2–0	—	4–1	3–0	3–1	3–1	4–0	1–4	1–3	2–0	3–3	2–2	1–0	1–1
SC Freiburg	3–1	1–2	2–1	5–0	1–4	1–3	—	1–0	3–2	3–2	0–0	2–2	0–0	3–1	1–2	0–3	3–1	3–2
1. FC Heidenheim	4–0	2–0	0–0	1–4	1–2	0–4	0–3	—	0–0	3–1	0–1	0–1	0–2	0–3	0–4	0–2	1–3	1–3
TSG Hoffenheim	1–1	0–4	3–1	3–4	2–3	2–2	1–1	1–1	—	3–2	4–3	1–4	2–0	1–2	0–4	0–2	1–1	0–1
Holstein Kiel	5–1	0–2	2–2	0–3	4–2	2–4	1–2	1–0	1–3	—	0–2	0–2	0–3	4–3	1–6	1–2	2–2	0–2
RB Leipzig	4–0	0–0	1–0	4–2	2–0	2–1	3–1	2–2	3–1	1–1	—	2–2	1–2	0–0	3–3	2–0	2–3	1–5
Bayer Leverkusen	2–0	0–0	3–1	0–2	2–4	2–1	5–1	5–2	3–1	2–2	2–3	—	1–0	3–1	0–0	2–1	0–0	4–3
Mainz 05	0–0	1–1	2–0	1–2	3–1	1–1	2–2	0–2	2–0	1–1	0–2	2–2	—	1–1	2–1	2–0	2–0	2–2
Borussia Mönchengladbach	0–3	1–0	3–0	4–1	1–1	1–1	1–2	3–2	4–4	4–1	1–0	2–3	1–3	—	0–1	2–0	1–3	0–1
Bayern Munich	3–0	3–0	2–3	3–0	2–2	4–0	2–0	4–2	5–0	4–3	5–1	1–1	3–0	2–0	—	3–2	4–0	3–2
FC St. Pauli	1–1	3–0	0–2	0–2	0–2	0–1	0–1	0–2	1–0	3–1	0–0	1–1	0–3	1–1	0–1	—	0–1	0–0
VfB Stuttgart	4–0	3–2	2–0	1–2	5–1	2–3	4–0	0–1	1–1	2–1	2–1	3–4	3–3	1–2	1–3	0–1	—	1–2
VfL Wolfsburg	1–1	1–0	1–1	2–4	1–3	1–2	0–1	0–1	2–2	2–2	2–3	0–0	4–3	5–1	2–3	1–1	2–2	—

Source: Bundesliga
Legend: Blue = home team win; Yellow = draw; Red = away team win.
For upcoming matches, an "a" indicates there is an article about the rivalry between the two participants.

== Relegation play-offs ==
The relegation play-offs took place on 22 and 26 May 2025.

=== Overview ===
Team 1	Agg.	Team 2	1st leg	2nd leg
1. FC Heidenheim (B)	4–3	SV Elversberg (2B)	2–2	2–1

=== Matches ===
22 May 2025
20:30

1. FC Heidenheim	2–2	SV Elversberg
Siersleben 62'; Honsak 64'	Report	Petkov 18'; Asllani 42'

Voith-Arena, Heidenheim
Attendance: 15,000
Referee: Sven Jablonski
26 May 2025
20:30

SV Elversberg	1–2	1. FC Heidenheim
Fellhauer 31'	Report	Honsak 9'; Scienza 90+5'

Waldstadion an der Kaiserlinde, Spiesen-Elversberg
Attendance: 9,105
Referee: Sascha Stegemann

1. FC Heidenheim won 4–3 on aggregate, and therefore both clubs remained in their respective leagues.

== Statistics ==
=== Top goalscorers ===
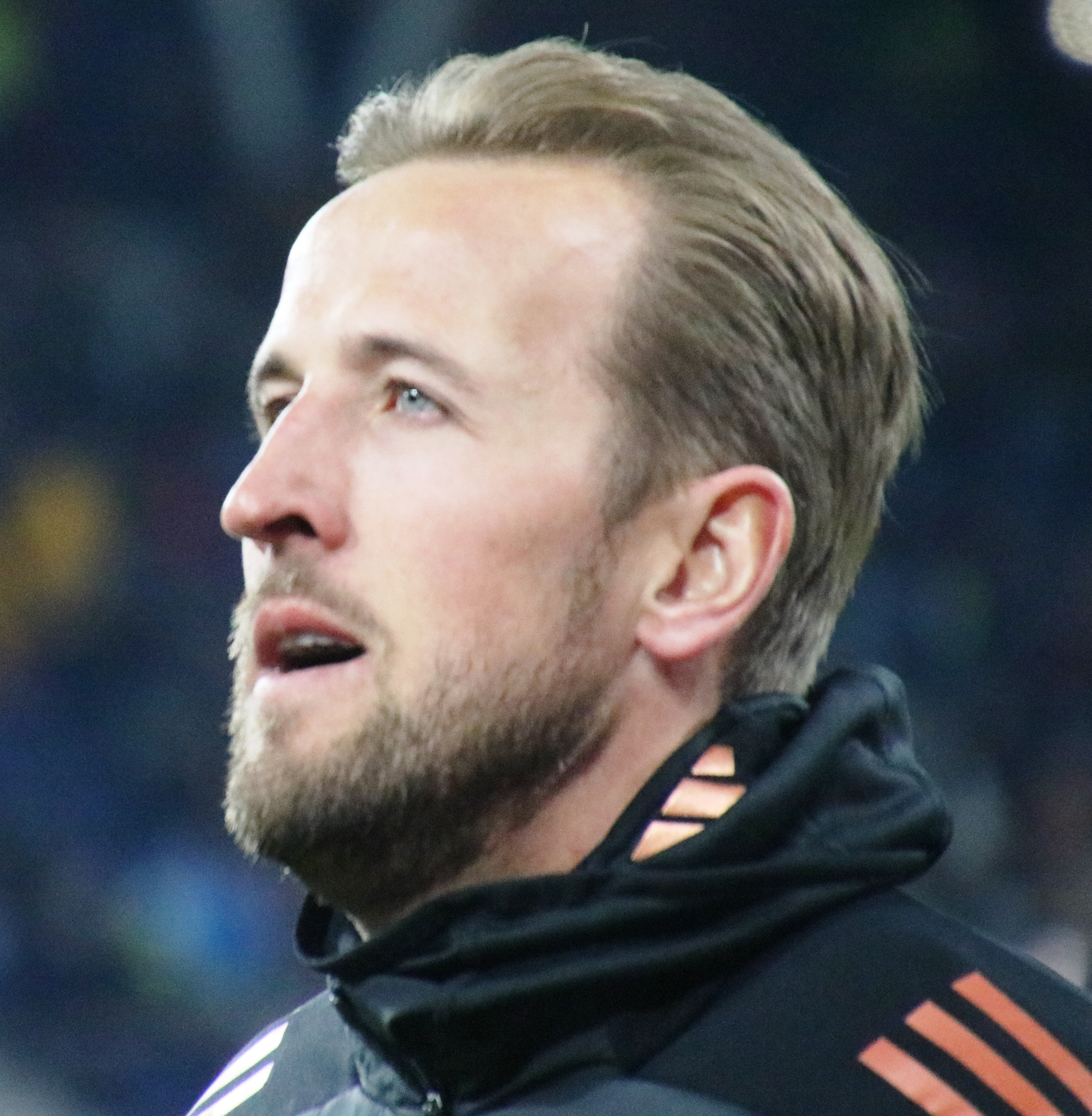
Harry Kane was the season's top scorer with 26 goals for Bayern Munich.

Rank	Player	Club	Goals
1	(England) Harry Kane	Bayern Munich	26
2	(Guinea) Serhou Guirassy	Borussia Dortmund	21
2	(Czech Republic) Patrik Schick	Bayer Leverkusen	21
4	(Germany) Jonathan Burkardt	Mainz 05	18
5	(Germany) Tim Kleindienst	Borussia Mönchengladbach	16
6	(Bosnia and Herzegovina) Ermedin Demirović	VfB Stuttgart	15
6	(France) Hugo Ekitike	Eintracht Frankfurt	15
6	(Egypt) Omar Marmoush (Note: In January 2025, Marmoush transferred to Manchester City. He played his last match for Eintracht Frankfurt against SC Freiburg on 14 January 2025.)	Eintracht Frankfurt	15
9	(Slovenia) Benjamin Šeško	RB Leipzig	13
10	(Germany) Jamal Musiala	Bayern Munich	12
10	(France) Michael Olise	Bayern Munich	12
10	(Germany) Nick Woltemade	VfB Stuttgart	12

=== Hat-tricks ===
Player	Club	Against	Result	Date
(Croatia) Andrej Kramarić	TSG Hoffenheim	Holstein Kiel	3–2 (H)	24 August 2024
(England) Harry Kane	Bayern Munich	Holstein Kiel	6–1 (A)	14 September 2024
(Denmark) Jens Stage	Werder Bremen	TSG Hoffenheim	4–3 (A)	29 September 2024
(England) Harry Kane	Bayern Munich	VfB Stuttgart	4–0 (H)	19 October 2024
(England) Harry Kane	Bayern Munich	FC Augsburg	3–0 (H)	22 November 2024
(Czech Republic) Patrik Schick	Bayer Leverkusen	1. FC Heidenheim	5–2 (H)	23 November 2024
(Czech Republic) Patrik Schick^{4}	Bayer Leverkusen	SC Freiburg	5–1 (H)	21 December 2024
(Netherlands) Myron Boadu	VfL Bochum	RB Leipzig	3–3 (H)	18 January 2025
(France) Alexis Claude-Maurice	FC Augsburg	Borussia Mönchengladbach	3–0 (A)	22 February 2025
(Guinea) Serhou Guirassy^{4}	Borussia Dortmund	Union Berlin	6–0 (H)	22 February 2025
(France) Alassane Pléa	Borussia Mönchengladbach	Werder Bremen	4–2 (A)	15 March 2025
(Bosnia and Herzegovina) Ermedin Demirović	VfB Stuttgart	VfL Bochum	4–0 (A)	5 April 2025

^{4} Player scored four goals.

=== Clean sheets ===
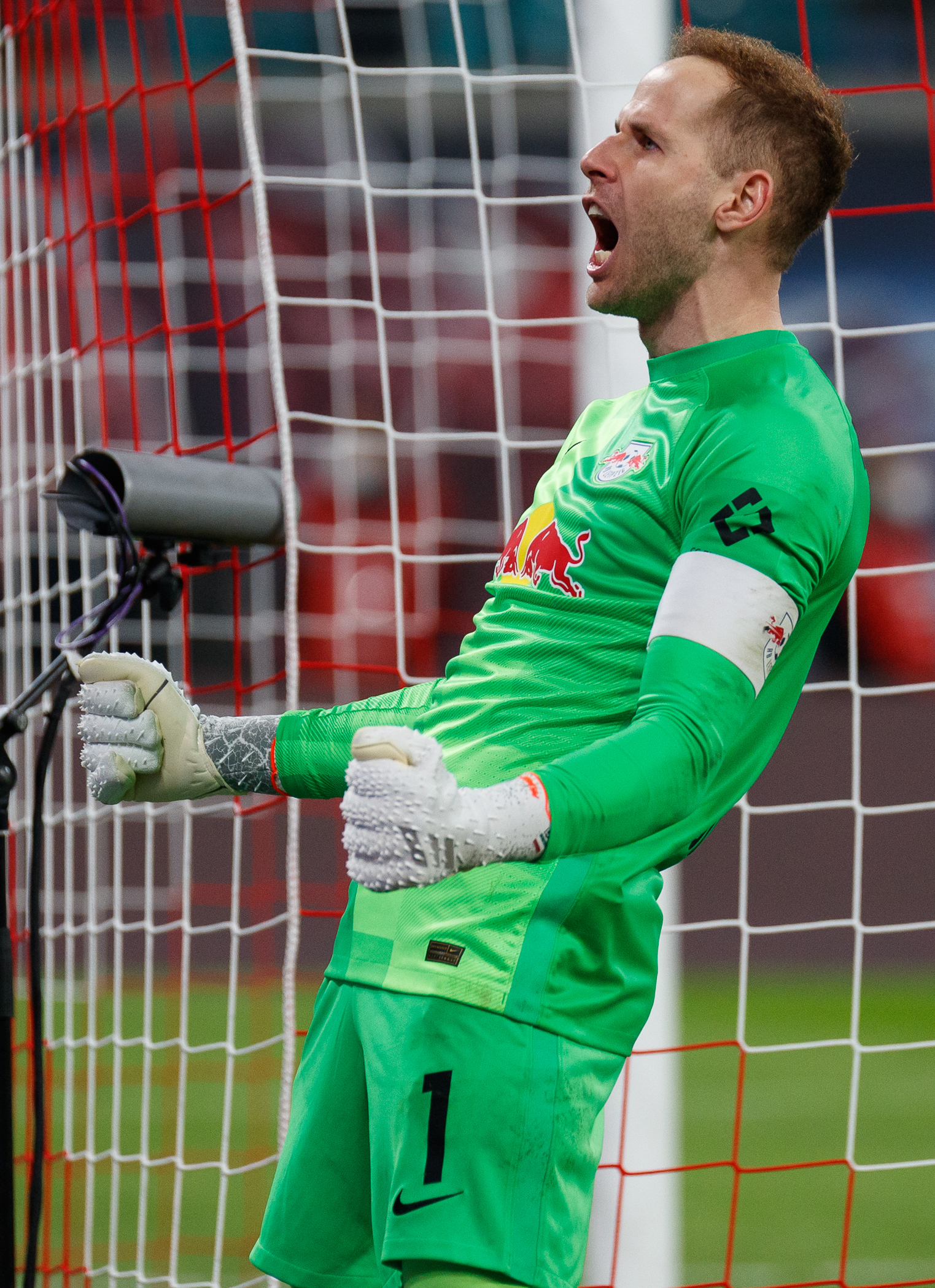
Péter Gulácsi kept the most clean sheets, recording 14 for RB Leipzig.

Rank	Player	Club	Clean sheets
1	(Hungary) Péter Gulácsi	RB Leipzig	14
2	(Germany) Manuel Neuer	Bayern Munich	13
3	(Germany) Noah Atubolu	SC Freiburg	10
3	(Germany) Michael Zetterer	Werder Bremen	10
5	(Germany) Finn Dahmen	FC Augsburg	9
5	(Bosnia and Herzegovina) Nikola Vasilj	FC St. Pauli	9
5	(Germany) Robin Zentner	Mainz 05	9
8	(Denmark) Frederik Rønnow	Union Berlin	8
9	(Switzerland) Gregor Kobel	Borussia Dortmund	7
9	(Germany) Kevin Müller	1. FC Heidenheim	7
9	(Germany) Alexander Nübel	VfB Stuttgart	7

== Awards ==
=== Monthly awards ===
Month	Player of the Month		Rookie of the Month		Goal of the Month		Ref.
Month	Player	Club	Player	Club	Player	Club	Ref.
August	(Nigeria) Victor Boniface	Bayer Leverkusen	—N/a		(Germany) Thomas Müller	Bayern Munich	
September	(Egypt) Omar Marmoush	Eintracht Frankfurt	(Brazil) Kauã Santos	Eintracht Frankfurt	(Germany) Aleksandar Pavlović	Bayern Munich	
October	(England) Harry Kane	Bayern Munich	(France) Michael Olise	Bayern Munich	(France) Kingsley Coman	Bayern Munich	
November	(Egypt) Omar Marmoush	Eintracht Frankfurt	(Germany) Nathaniel Brown	Eintracht Frankfurt	(Germany) Jamal Musiala	Bayern Munich	
December	(Germany) Florian Wirtz	Bayer Leverkusen	(Germany) Nathaniel Brown	Eintracht Frankfurt	(Germany) Joshua Kimmich	Bayern Munich	
January	(Germany) Florian Wirtz	Bayer Leverkusen	(France) Chrislain Matsima	FC Augsburg	(Germany) Florian Wirtz	Bayer Leverkusen	
February	(Guinea) Serhou Guirassy	Borussia Dortmund	(Germany) Lukas Ullrich	Borussia Mönchengladbach	(Germany) Jamal Musiala	Bayern Munich	
March	(Germany) Nico Schlotterbeck	Borussia Dortmund	(France) Chrislain Matsima	FC Augsburg	(Portugal) Raphaël Guerreiro	Bayern Munich	
April	(France) Michael Olise	Bayern Munich	(Sweden) Daniel Svensson	Borussia Dortmund	(Germany) Serge Gnabry	Bayern Munich	
May	—N/a		—N/a		(Slovakia) László Bénes	Union Berlin	

=== Annual awards ===
Award	Winner	Club	Ref.
Player of the Season	(England) Harry Kane	Bayern Munich	
Rookie of the Season	(France) Michael Olise	Bayern Munich	
Goal of the Season	(Austria) Leopold Querfeld	Union Berlin	

=== Team of the Season ===
Presenters	Goalkeeper	Defenders	Midfielders	Forwards	Ref.
EA Sports (official)	(Germany) Robin Zentner (Mainz 05)	(Germany) Jonathan Tah (Bayer Leverkusen) (France) Dayot Upamecano (Bayern Munich) (Germany) Nico Schlotterbeck (Borussia Dortmund) (Canada) Alphonso Davies (Bayern Munich)	(Germany) Florian Wirtz (Bayer Leverkusen) (Germany) Jamal Musiala (Bayern Munich) (France) Michael Olise (Bayern Munich)	(France) Hugo Ekitike (Eintracht Frankfurt) (England) Harry Kane (Bayern Munich) (Guinea) Serhou Guirassy (Borussia Dortmund)	
VDV	(Germany) Finn Dahmen (FC Augsburg)	(Germany) Nico Schlotterbeck (Borussia Dortmund) (Germany) Jonathan Tah (Bayer Leverkusen) (France) Dayot Upamecano (Bayern Munich) (Germany) Joshua Kimmich (Bayern Munich)	(Switzerland) Granit Xhaka (Bayer Leverkusen) (Germany) Jamal Musiala (Bayern Munich) (Germany) Florian Wirtz (Bayer Leverkusen) (Germany) Nadiem Amiri (Mainz 05)	(England) Harry Kane (Bayern Munich) (France) Michael Olise (Bayern Munich)	
kicker	(Hungary) Péter Gulácsi (RB Leipzig)	(Germany) Matthias Ginter (SC Freiburg) (Germany) Jonathan Tah (Bayer Leverkusen) (Ecuador) Piero Hincapié (Bayer Leverkusen)	(Germany) Joshua Kimmich (Bayern Munich) (Germany) Nadiem Amiri (Mainz 05) (France) Michael Olise (Bayern Munich) (Germany) Nick Woltemade (VfB Stuttgart) (Germany) Florian Wirtz (Bayer Leverkusen)	(Guinea) Serhou Guirassy (Borussia Dortmund) (England) Harry Kane (Bayern Munich)	

== Attendances ==
Borussia Dortmund drew the highest average home attendance in the 2024–25 Bundesliga.

Rank	Team	Home games	Average attendance
1	Borussia Dortmund	17	81,365
2	Bayern München	17	75,000
3	VfB Stuttgart	17	59,265
4	Eintracht Frankfurt	17	57,659
5	Borussia Mönchengladbach	17	52,867
6	RB Leipzig	17	45,045
7	Werder Bremen	17	41,321
8	SC Freiburg	17	34,253
9	Mainz 05	17	32,340
10	Bayer Leverkusen	17	29,961
11	FC Augsburg	17	29,923
12	FC St. Pauli	17	29,507
13	VfL Bochum	17	25,540
14	TSG Hoffenheim	17	25,309
15	VfL Wolfsburg	17	24,596
16	Union Berlin	17	21,964
17	1. FC Heidenheim	17	15,000
18	KSV Holstein	17	14,891
