= SoGK Charlo =

Swedish sports club

- Full name: Sport- och gymnastikklubben Charlo
- Sport: football
- Founded: 1938
- Based in: Svarte, Sweden

SoGK Charlo is a sports club in Svarte, Sweden, established in 1938.

The women's football team played four seasons in the Swedish top division between 1978 and 1982.

The Swedish international footballer Hugo Larsson played for the club for six years in his youth.
