= Hugo Larsson (footballer) =

Swedish footballer (born 2004)

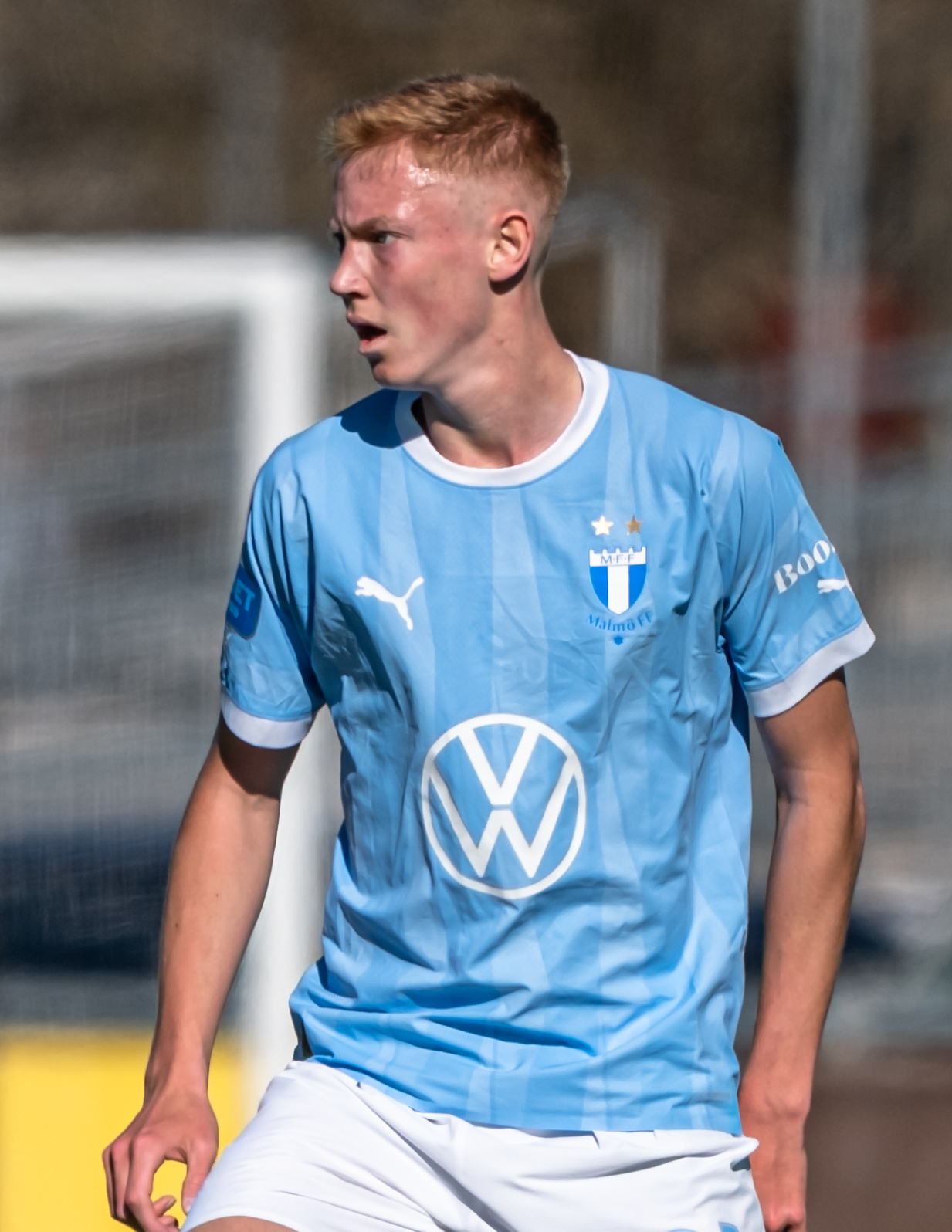
- Larsson with Malmö FF in 2023

Personal information
- Full name: Hugo Emanuel Larsson
- Date of birth: 27 June 2004 (age 22)
- Place of birth: Svarte, Sweden
- Height: 1.87 m (6 ft 2 in)
- Position: Midfielder

Team information
- Current team: Fulham (on loan from Eintracht Frankfurt)
- Number: 15

Youth career
- 2009–2014: SoGK Charlo
- 2015: Ystads IF
- 2016–2021: Malmö FF

Senior career*
Years	Team	Apps	(Gls)
2022–2023	Malmö FF	39	(3)
2023–	Eintracht Frankfurt	87	(7)
2026–	→ Fulham (loan)	6	(0)

International career^{‡}
2021–2022	Sweden U19	9	(0)
2023	Sweden U21	3	(1)
2023–	Sweden	17	(1)
- * Club domestic league appearances and goals as of 22:04, 31 October 2026 (UTC) ‡ National team caps and goals as of 23:50, 17 November 2026 (UTC)

Hugo Emanuel Larsson (born 27 June 2004) is a Swedish professional footballer who plays as a midfielder for Premier League club Fulham, on loan from Bundesliga club Eintracht Frankfurt, and the Sweden national team.

== Club career ==
=== Malmö FF ===
Born in Ystad, Larsson began his footballing career in local team SoGK Charlo, and continued with Ystads IF before signing with Malmö FF as a 12-year-old. As a youngster he played as a forward and was renowned for his goalscoring record, leading to a one-week trial with Chelsea FC before his move to Malmö FF. As Larsson progressed through the club's academy, central midfielder became his new position. He made his senior debut for Malmö FF on 20 February 2022 in a Svenska Cupen against GAIS, appearing as a late substitute in a 5–1 win. He made his Allsvenskan debut on 11 April 2022 in a 1–1 draw with IF Elfsborg, playing for 45 minutes. Larsson scored his first goal for the club against Degerfors IF on 6 November 2022. Malmö FF struggled in 2022 and finished seventh in Allsvenskan, but Larsson had a breakthrough season and received the Allsvenskan young player of the year award after playing a joint top 46 games for the club in all competitions. In his final home game before his recently announced move to Eintracht Frankfurt, Larsson scored the first goal in a 5–0 win and received standing ovations while being substituted in the 82nd minute.

=== Eintracht Frankfurt ===
On 29 May 2023, Larsson signed for Bundesliga club Eintracht Frankfurt on a five-year contract for an undisclosed fee, a record fee received for a Swedish club. He officially joined the German club upon the opening of the summer transfer window on 1 July. On 8 October, he scored his first Bundesliga goal in a 2–0 win over Heidenheim. Two months later, on 9 December, he netted his second goal in a 5–1 victory over Bayern Munich. On 31 August 2024, Larsson scored his first goal of the season, in a 3–1 home win against TSG Hoffenheim in the Bundesliga.

==== Loan to Fulham ====
On 1 September 2026, Larsson joined Premier League club Fulham on loan with an obligation to buy.

== International career ==
Larsson has represented the U19 and U21 teams. He made his full international debut for Sweden on 9 January 2023, playing for 68 minutes in a friendly 2–0 win against Finland before being replaced by Bilal Hussein.

== Personal life ==
Larsson was born in his neighbour's bathroom in Svarte.

== Career statistics ==
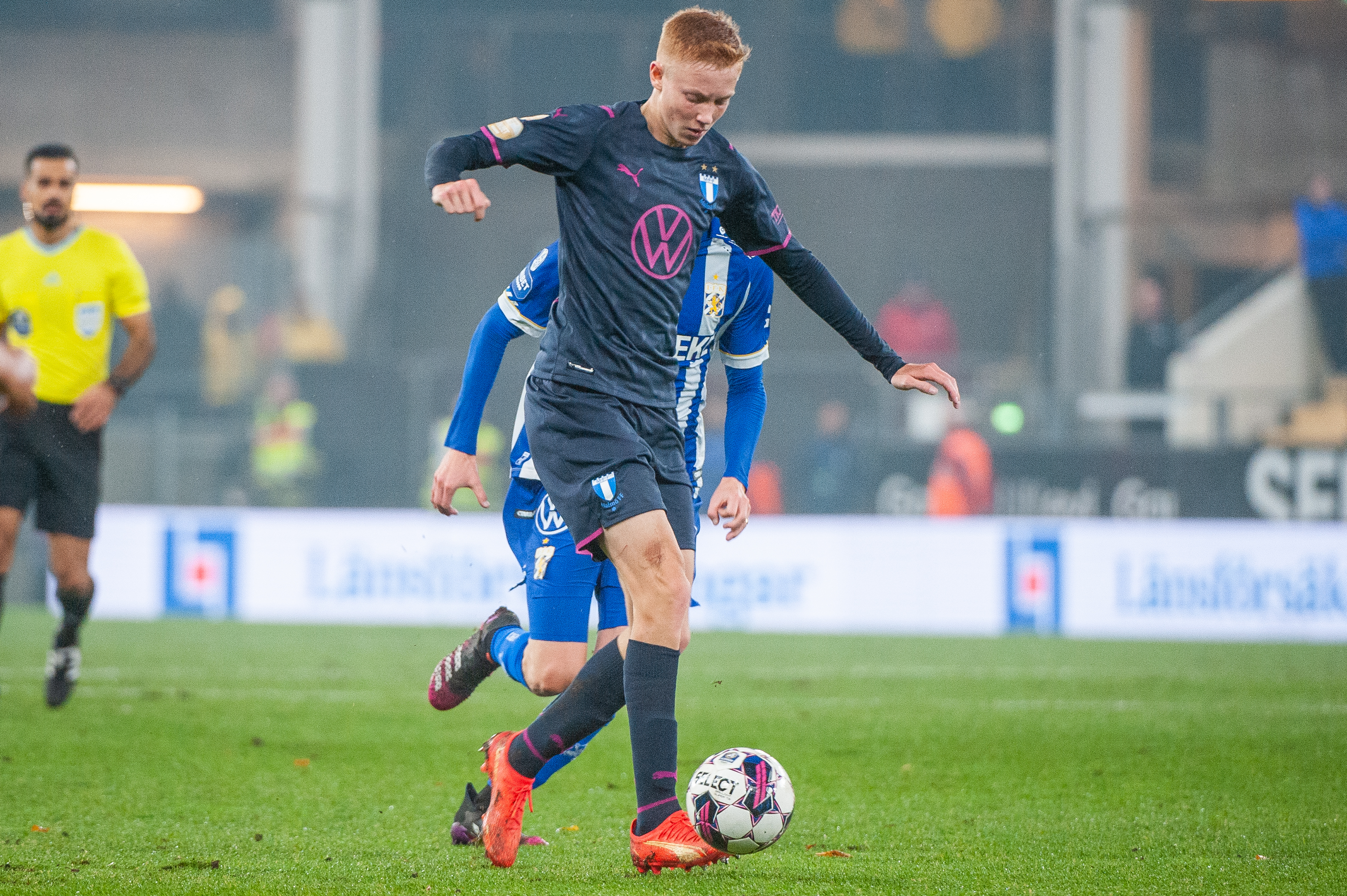
Larsson playing for Malmö FF in 2022

=== Club ===
As of match played 31 October 2026

Appearances and goals by club, season and competition
Club	Season	League			National cup (Note: Includes Svenska Cupen, DFB-Pokal)		League cup (Note: Includes EFL Cup)		Europe		Total	
Club	Season	Division	Apps	Goals	Apps	Goals	Apps	Goals	Apps	Goals	Apps	Goals
Malmö FF	2022	Allsvenskan	27	1	6	0	—		13 (Note: Four appearances in UEFA Champions League, nine appearances in UEFA Europa League)	0	46	1
Malmö FF	2023	Allsvenskan	12	2	3	0	—		—		15	2
Malmö FF	Total		39	3	9	0	—		13	0	61	3
Eintracht Frankfurt	2023–24	Bundesliga	29	2	3	0	—		6 (Note: Appearances in UEFA Europa Conference League)	0	38	2
Eintracht Frankfurt	2024–25	Bundesliga	33	3	3	0	—		11 (Note: Appearances in UEFA Europa League)	3	47	6
Eintracht Frankfurt	2025–26	Bundesliga	25	2	2	0	—		7 (Note: Appearances in UEFA Champions League)	0	34	1
Eintracht Frankfurt	Total		87	7	8	0	—		24	3	119	10
Fulham (loan)	2026–27	Premier League	6	0	0	0	2	0	—		8	0
Career total			132	10	17	0	2	0	37	3	188	13

=== International ===
As of match played 17 November 2026

Appearances and goals by national team and year
National team	Year	Apps	Goals
Sweden	2023	4	0
Sweden	2024	4	0
Sweden	2025	4	0
Sweden	2026	5	1
Total		17	1

Scores and results list Sweden's goal tally first, score column indicates score after each Larsson goal.

List of international goals scored by Hugo Larsson
No.	Date	Venue	Cap	Opponent	Score	Result	Competition
1	17 November 2026	Wrocław Stadium, Wrocław, Poland	17	Poland	1–1	1–1	2026–27 UEFA Nations League B

== Honours ==
Malmö FF

- Allsvenskan: 2023
- Svenska Cupen: 2021–22

Individual

- Allsvenskan Young Player of the Year: 2022
