= Hugo Ekitike =

French footballer (born 2002)

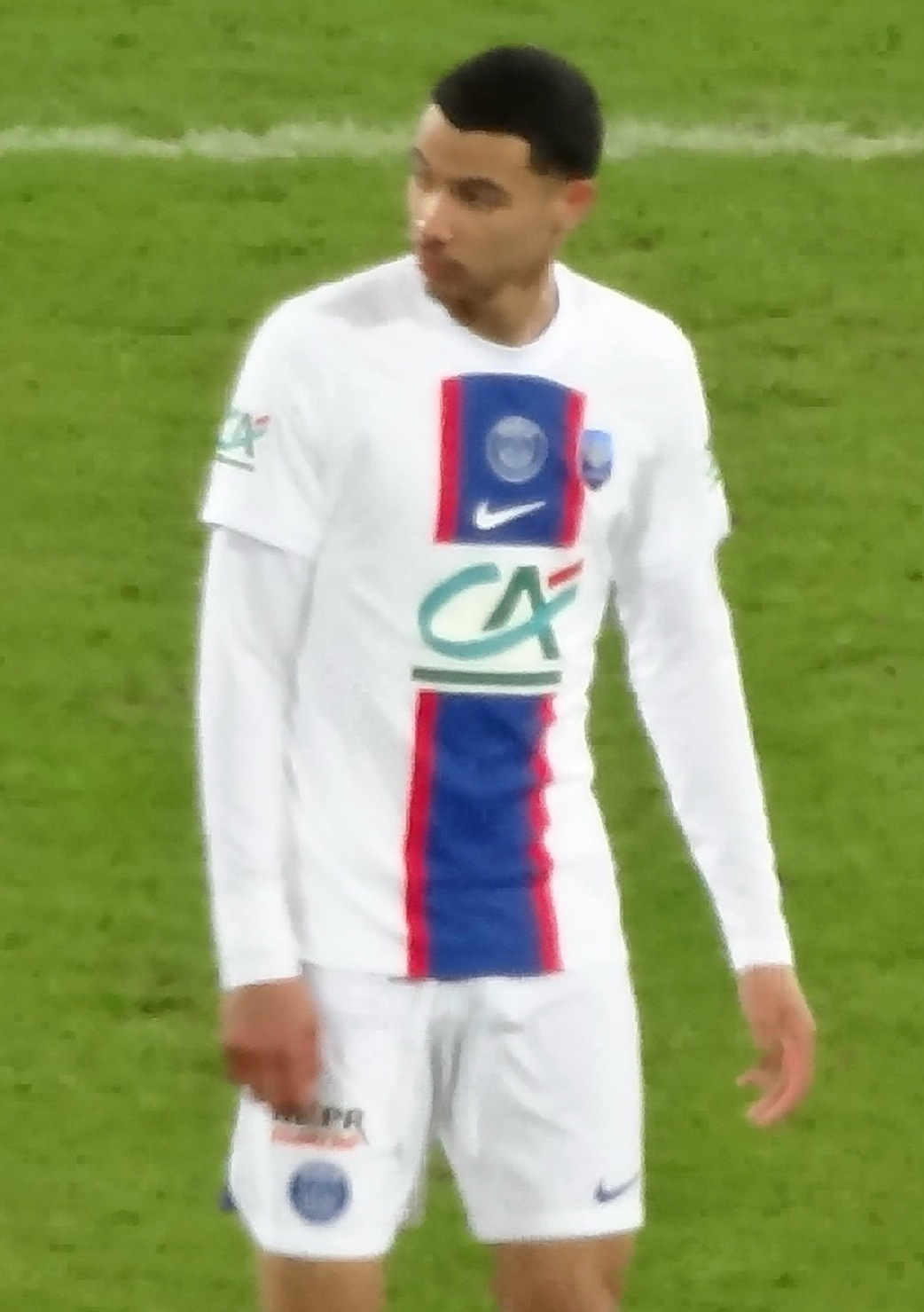
- Ekitike playing for Paris Saint-Germain in 2023

Personal information
- Full name: Hugo Timothée Ekitike
- Date of birth: 20 June 2002 (age 24)
- Place of birth: Reims, Marne, France
- Height: 1.90 m (6 ft 3 in)
- Position: Striker

Team information
- Current team: Liverpool
- Number: 22

Youth career
- 2008–2013: Cormontreuil FC
- 2013–2019: Reims

Senior career*
Years	Team	Apps	(Gls)
2019–2021	Reims B	15	(6)
2020–2023	Reims	26	(10)
2021	→ Vejle Boldklub (loan)	11	(3)
2022–2023	→ Paris Saint-Germain (loan)	25	(3)
2023–2024	Paris Saint-Germain	1	(0)
2024	→ Eintracht Frankfurt (loan)	14	(4)
2024–2025	Eintracht Frankfurt	33	(15)
2025–	Liverpool	28	(11)

International career^{‡}
2021–2022	France U20	6	(0)
2024–2025	France U21	5	(5)
2025–	France	8	(2)
- * Club domestic league appearances and goals as of 14:56, 21 March 2026 (UTC) ‡ National team caps and goals as of 23:37, 29 March 2026 (UTC)

Hugo Timothée Ekitike (or Ekitiké; French pronunciation: [yɡˈo ekitikˈe]; born 20 June 2002) is a French professional footballer who plays as a striker for Premier League club Liverpool and the France national team.

Ekitike began his professional career at 18 with Reims, playing for their reserves team before being called up to the senior squad in 2020. Between 2021 and 2022, Ekitike had loan spells at Vejle Boldklub and Paris Saint-Germain, winning the Ligue 1 title and appearing in the UEFA Champions League. He signed permanently for Paris Saint-Germain for a €28.5 million transfer fee in 2023.

Ekitike was sent on loan to Eintracht Frankfurt in February 2024, joining the club on a permanent basis in April for €16.5 million. During his only full season at Frankfurt, he scored 15 goals in 33 league games, helped Frankfurt to a 3rd-place finish in the Bundesliga, and appeared in the 2024–25 Bundesliga Team of the Season. In July 2025, he was signed by Liverpool for a reported fee of €80 million (£69 million).

Ekitike has represented France as a youth international player, appearing for the under-20 and under-21 sides, and made his senior debut in 2025.

== Early life ==
Hugo Timothée Ekitike was born on 20 June 2002 in Reims, Marne, France, to a Cameroonian father and a French mother. He began his youth career at Cormontreuil FC, a small local football club in Cormontreuil, before joining the academy at Stade de Reims in 2013.

== Club career ==
=== Reims ===
On 12 July 2020, Ekitike signed his first professional contract with Reims. He debuted with the senior team in a 3–1 Ligue 1 loss to Lorient on 17 October 2020. On 29 January 2021, Ekitike joined Danish Superliga club Vejle Boldklub on loan for the rest of the season.

On 26 September 2021, Ekitike scored Reims' second and third goals in a 3–1 win against Nantes, having come on as a substitute. In the January 2022 transfer window, Ekitike rejected a potential transfer to Newcastle United. Reims president Jean-Pierre Caillot admitted that the club had received "very good offers" for Ekitike, but reiterated that "there is still a piece of history to write together".

=== Paris Saint-Germain ===
On 16 July 2022, Paris Saint-Germain (PSG) announced the signing of Ekitike on a season-long loan with an option-to-buy for a reported fee of €35 million, bonuses included. According to several sources, the purchase option in the deal was made mandatory.

Ekitike made his PSG debut as a substitute in a 5–0 league win away to Clermont on 6 August 2022. On 1 October, he made his first start for the club in a 2–1 league victory over Nice at the Parc des Princes. Ten days later, Ekitike made his UEFA Champions League debut, coming on as a late-match substitute in a 1–1 home draw against Benfica. On 13 November, he scored his first goal for Paris Saint-Germain in a 5–0 home win over Auxerre. He finished the season with four goals and four assists in thirty-two matches, winning his first Ligue 1 title. In June 2023, his transfer to PSG became a permanent deal worth €28.5 million plus €6.5 million in bonuses. In September 2023, it was reported that he was excluded from the Champions League squad for the 2023–24 season.

=== Eintracht Frankfurt ===
On 1 February 2024, Ekitike signed for Bundesliga club Eintracht Frankfurt on loan until the end of the season with a buy option. He made his debut as a substitute in a 2–0 defeat away to FC Köln two days later. On 19 April, he scored his first goal for the club in a 3–1 home victory over FC Augsburg. On 26 April, the buy option in Ekitike's loan deal at Eintracht Frankfurt was activated, and he was transferred for a fee of €16.5 million. He signed a deal until the end of the 2028–29 season. The following day, Ekitike scored a goal in 2–1 defeat away to Bayern Munich, a right-footed strike from outside the box into the bottom-right corner of the net. On 10 April 2025, Ekitike scored a long range strike in the Europa League quarter-finals first leg against Tottenham Hotspur.

By the end of the 2024–25 season, Ekitike scored 15 goals in 33 league games. The club finished in 3rd place in the Bundesliga, securing a spot in the 2025–26 Champions League. At the end of the campaign, Ekitike appeared in the 2024–25 Bundesliga Team of the Season.

=== Liverpool ===
On 23 July 2025, Ekitike signed for Premier League club Liverpool in a transfer worth up to €95 million (£82.4 million). The transfer includes an €80 million (£69 million) initial payment, and €15 million (£13 million) of performance-related add-ons that, if reached, would present a club-record fee for Eintracht Frankfurt, surpassing the €95 million (£82.3 million) paid for Randal Kolo Muani by Paris Saint-Germain in 2023. According to The Athletic and The Independent, Newcastle United had also offered €75 million (£70 million) for Ekitike, echoing their approach for the player in 2022, but Ekitike made clear his preference to join Liverpool. Ekitike signed a six-year contract with Liverpool that will expire at the end of the 2030–31 season.

Ekitike made his debut for Liverpool in the 2025 FA Community Shield against Crystal Palace on 10 August, scoring his first goal for the club in an eventual 3–2 loss on penalties following a 2–2 draw in normal time. On 15 August, he debuted and scored his first goal in the Premier League in a 4–2 win over Bournemouth.

On 23 September, he scored the winning goal for Liverpool in the 2–1 win against Southampton in the EFL Cup. After scoring the goal he removed his jersey in celebration and received a second yellow card and was sent-off. A month later, on 22 October, he scored his first Champions League goal with Liverpool in a 5–1 away win over his former club Eintracht Frankfurt.

On 14 April 2026, Ekitike sustained an Achilles injury during a Champions League quarter-final game against Paris Saint-Germain which sidelined him for several months, including for the 2026 World Cup. Despite missing many games due to the injury, he ended the 2025-26 season as Liverpool's top Premier League goalscorer with 11 goals.

== International career ==
Ekitike was eligible to play for France because of his birth and through his mother and for Cameroon through his father. He is a youth international for France, having represented the France U20. On 31 August 2025, he received his first call up to the French senior team, replacing the injured Rayan Cherki. He went on to make his senior international debut on 5 September, coming off the bench with around ten minutes remaining in a 2026 FIFA World Cup qualification match against Ukraine, which ended in a 2–0 victory for France. On 13 November, Ekitike scored his first senior international goal in a 4–0 win over Ukraine to help guarantee France's place in the 2026 FIFA World Cup.

== Personal life ==
Ekitike is a practicing Muslim.

== Career statistics ==
=== Club ===
As of match played 14 April 2026

Appearances and goals by club, season and competition
Club	Season	League			National cup (Note: Includes Coupe de France, DFB-Pokal, FA Cup)		League cup (Note: Includes EFL Cup)		Europe		Other		Total	
Club	Season	Division	Apps	Goals	Apps	Goals	Apps	Goals	Apps	Goals	Apps	Goals	Apps	Goals
Reims B	2019–20	Championnat National 2	12	5	—		—		—		—		12	5
Reims B	2020–21	Championnat National 2	2	1	—		—		—		—		2	1
Reims B	2021–22	Championnat National 2	1	0	—		—		—		—		1	0
Reims B	Total		15	6	—		—		—		—		15	6
Reims	2020–21	Ligue 1	2	0	0	0	—		0	0	—		2	0
Reims	2021–22	Ligue 1	24	10	2	1	—		—		—		26	11
Reims	Total		26	10	2	1	—		0	0	—		28	11
Vejle Boldklub (loan)	2020–21	Danish Superliga	11	3	0	0	—		—		—		11	3
Paris Saint-Germain (loan)	2022–23	Ligue 1	25	3	3	1	—		4 (Note: Appearances in UEFA Champions League)	0	0	0	32	4
Paris Saint-Germain	2023–24	Ligue 1	1	0	0	0	—		0	0	0	0	1	0
Paris Saint-Germain	PSG total		26	3	3	1	—		4	0	0	0	33	4
Eintracht Frankfurt (loan)	2023–24	Bundesliga	14	4	—		—		2 (Note: Appearances in UEFA Europa Conference League)	0	—		16	4
Eintracht Frankfurt	2024–25	Bundesliga	33	15	3	3	—		12 (Note: Appearances in UEFA Europa League)	4	—		48	22
Eintracht Frankfurt	Frankfurt total		47	19	3	3	—		14	4	—		64	26
Liverpool	2025–26	Premier League	28	11	3	1	1	1	12	3	1 (Note: Appearance in FA Community Shield)	1	45	17
Career total			153	52	11	6	1	1	30	7	1	1	196	67

=== International ===
As of match played 29 March 2026

Appearances and goals by national team and year
National team	Year	Apps	Goals
France	2025	6	1
France	2026	2	1
Total		8	2

Scores and results list France's goal tally first.

List of international goals scored by Hugo Ekitike
No.	Date	Venue	Cap	Opponent	Score	Result	Competition
1	13 November 2025	Parc des Princes, Paris, France	5	Ukraine	4–0	4–0	2026 FIFA World Cup qualification
2	26 March 2026	Gillette Stadium, Foxborough, United States	7	Brazil	2–0	2–1	Friendly

== Honours ==
Paris Saint-Germain

- Ligue 1: 2022–23

France U20

- Maurice Revello Tournament: 2022

Individual

- Bundesliga Team of the Season: 2024–25
