= 9flats =

Online short-term lodging marketplace website

9flats.com
- Website type: Privately held company
- Founded: 2010; 16 years ago, Launch: March 2011; 15 years ago
- Headquarters: Singapore
- Owners: eVentures, Redpoint, T-Ventures, Founders
- Founder: Stephan Uhrenbacher; Roman Bach
- Key people: Stephan Uhrenbacher, Chairman
- Industry: Lodging
- Website: www.9flats.com

9flats is an online marketplace enabling people to lease or rent short-term lodging. The company does not own any lodging; it is merely a broker and receives commissions from both guests and hosts in conjunction with every booking.

The site competes with Airbnb.

It has over 50,000 members and 30,000 hosts in 104 countries.

== History ==
9flats was launched by German internet entrepreneur Stephan Uhrenbacher – founder of Qype, and former head of northern European operations for lastminute.com.

The founders secured funding from venture capital fund E.ventures (CityDeal/Groupon) and launched 9flats.com in February 2011 with an inventory of 5,000 places.

In May 2011, 9flats secured another round of investment from venture capital funds Redpoint Ventures (HomeAway), ProFounder (ex-lastminute.com) and Greycroft Partners, bringing the total funding to US$10 million.

In late 2011, 9flats became the first well-known European or North American company in the social travel space to open an Asian office in Singapore, led by VP of Asia Ng Wei Leen, establishing a presence ahead of global competitors like Airbnb.

In January 2012, 9flats completed a round of funding led by T-Venture, the venture capital arm of Deutsche Telekom AG. This round included Redpoint Ventures and E-Venture Capital Partners (Hamburg).

In August 2012, 9flats acquired Toronto-based competitor iStopOver, extending its service to North America and growing its property base to 100.000 apartments.

In August 2012, Wired ranked the company 6th on its list of hottest startups in Berlin.

In March 2013, 9flats introduced bitcoin as payment method.

In February 2014, Roman Bach was named CEO; he vacated that post in April 2016. Uhrenbacher moved to the advisory board.

In 2014, 9flats announced that it is the first profitable player in the social travel industry.

In November 2014, 9flats made prepayment optional and allowed user to pay with cash.

In October 2016, 9flats acquired Wimdu.

In December 2016, 9flats sold Wimdu to the Novasol brand of Wyndham Destinations.
