= Interhome =

Swiss tourism company

- Type: Corporation
- Industry: Tourism, Holiday apartment
- Founded: 1965
- Headquarters: Glattbrugg, Switzerland
- Key people: Jörg Herrmann (CEO)
- Products: Holiday home rental
- Website: www.interhome.com

Interhome is a holiday home specialist focused on the rental and management of holiday houses, apartments, chalets, and villas. Founded in 1965, the company is headquartered in Glattbrugg, Switzerland, and operates in more than 20 countries. Interhome manages a portfolio of thousands of holiday properties on behalf of more than 20,000 property owners.

The company provides holiday home management services through a network of local service offices and partner agencies in over 200 destinations across Europe. Its services include marketing and distribution, booking management, guest services, final cleaning, and year-round local property support.

Since 2025, Interhome has been part of the HomeToGo Group, Europe's leading vacation rental group. Interhome operates under HomeToGo Originals, the umbrella brand of the HomeToGo Group. HomeToGo Originals brings together established, locally rooted brands under a shared identity, combining their regional expertise with HomeToGo's global marketplace distribution and advanced travel technology.

== History ==
The company was founded in London in 1965 by Bruno Franzen (1942-2017) and Werner Frey under the company name Swiss Chalets and was renamed Interhome in 1977 following a merger. The company was also known for its attempt to establish a paperless office.

In 1984, the company logo with the ‘migratory bird’ was introduced, which has also served as the company's logo since 2008. Online bookings have been possible since 1999. In 2009, the proportion of online bookings was around 60 per cent. In 2011, Hotelplan announced the takeover of the German market leader Inter Chalet on 1 November 2013. In 2015, Interhome celebrated its 50th anniversary. In the same year, the company headquarters in Switzerland took 6th place in the ‘Swiss Employer Awards’ in the 50-99 employee category.

== Offer ==
Interhome’s portfolio comprises more than 70,000 holiday homes in over 20 countries. The holiday home specialist offers property owners and guests an extensive service package. This is made possible by more than 200 local service offices and partner locations across Europe. Interhome also ensures optimum occupancy and returns for owners with customised services such as international marketing and distribution as well as service and maintenance work on the holiday properties. Interhome is part of the HomeToGo Group.
