= Nnamdi Collins =

German footballer (born 2004)

Personal information
- Full name: Pharrell Nnamdi Collins
- Date of birth: 10 January 2004 (age 22)
- Place of birth: Düsseldorf, Germany
- Height: 6 ft 2 in (1.88 m)
- Positions: Centre-back; right-back

Team information
- Current team: Eintracht Frankfurt
- Number: 34

Youth career
- –2016: Fortuna Düsseldorf
- 2016–2023: Borussia Dortmund

Senior career*
Years	Team	Apps	(Gls)
2023	Borussia Dortmund II	8	(0)
2023–	Eintracht Frankfurt	51	(2)
2023–2025	Eintracht Frankfurt II	16	(0)

International career^{‡}
2019	Germany U15	1	(1)
2019–2020	Germany U16	4	(2)
2020	Germany U17	1	(0)
2021–2022	Germany U18	3	(0)
2022–2023	Germany U19	6	(0)
2023–2024	Germany U20	8	(0)
2024–	Germany U21	15	(0)
2025–	Germany	1	(0)
Medal record
Men's football
Representing Germany
UEFA European Under-21 Championship
Runner-up	2025 Slovakia
- * Club domestic league appearances and goals as of 24 October 2026 ‡ National team caps and goals as of 20:35, 17 November 2026 (UTC)

Pharrell Nnamdi Collins (born 10 January 2004) is a German professional footballer who plays as a centre-back or right-back for Bundesliga club Eintracht Frankfurt and the Germany national team.

== Early life ==
Born in Düsseldorf, Collins spent time in the academy of Fortuna Düsseldorf.

== Club career ==
=== Borussia Dortmund ===
Collins joined Borussia Dortmund in 2016, and rose quickly through the youth ranks, linking up with the U19 squad at the age of 16. Following these good performances, he was reportedly subject of a £2 million bid from English club Chelsea. However, he signed a new contract in May 2020, and was invited to train with the first team in March 2021.

Having been called up to the first team for pre-season friendlies, Collins featured in a 3–1 loss to fellow Bundesliga side VfL Bochum, however he went off injured after suffering a dislocated kneecap.

=== Eintracht Frankfurt ===
On 8 August 2023, Collins joined Eintracht Frankfurt by signing a five-year contract. On 5 April 2024, he made his senior debut against Werder Bremen and played for 65 minutes in a 1–1 draw.

== International career ==
Collins represented Germany at youth international level. He is also eligible to represent Nigeria and the Poland through family.

In August 2025, Collins received his first call-up to the German senior team from coach Julian Nagelsmann for the 2026 World Cup qualifiers. On 4 September that year, he made his debut in a 2–0 away defeat against Slovakia. His debut did not go well and he was overwhelmed as a right-back. He received the lowest possible grade from kicker, which made him the weakest Germany debutant in history in terms of grading.

== Style of play ==
In 2021, Collins was recognised as one of the best young talents in Germany

== Career statistics ==
=== Club ===
As of match played 27 October 2026

Appearances and goals by club, season and competition
Club	Season	League			DFB-Pokal		Europe		Other		Total	
Club	Season	Division	Apps	Goals	Apps	Goals	Apps	Goals	Apps	Goals	Apps	Goals
Borussia Dortmund II	2022–23	3. Liga	8	0	—		—		—		8	0
Eintracht Frankfurt	2023–24	Bundesliga	2	0	0	0	—		—		2	0
Eintracht Frankfurt	2024–25	Bundesliga	22	1	2	0	6 (Note: Appearances in UEFA Europa League)	0	—		30	1
Eintracht Frankfurt	2025–26	Bundesliga	23	1	1	0	6 (Note: Appearances in UEFA Champions League)	0	—		30	1
Eintracht Frankfurt	2026–27	Bundesliga	4	0	1	0	—		—		5	0
Eintracht Frankfurt	Total		51	2	4	0	12	0	—		67	2
Eintracht Frankfurt II	2023–24	Regionalliga Südwest	16	0	—		—		—		16	0
Career total			75	2	4	0	12	0	0	0	91	2

=== International ===
As of match played 4 September 2025

Appearances and goals by national team and year
National team	Year	Apps	Goals
Germany	2025	1	0
Total		1	0

== Honours ==
Germany U21

- UEFA European Under-21 Championship runner-up: 2025
