= Smoobu.com =

German vacation rental software company

Smoobu
- Type: Subsidiary
- Industry: Software as a service; Property management software; Travel technology
- Founded: August 8, 2014; 12 years ago in Berlin, Germany
- Headquarters: Berlin, Germany
- Key people: Jannik Abraham (Managing Director); Jürgen Zoilo von Beyme Cortés (Managing Director)
- Products: Vacation rental property management, channel management software
- Parent: HomeToGo
- Website: www.smoobu.com

Smoobu GmbH is a software as a service company based in Berlin that develops property management and channel management software for vacation rental hosts. The company has been part of the HomeToGo Group since 2021 and its software business forms part of the group's HomeToGo_PRO business-to-business segment.

== History ==
Smoobu was registered in Berlin on 8 August 2014 and was founded by Fabian Beckers and Philipp Reuter. The company initially focused on business customers before shifting towards software aimed at individual and small-scale vacation rental hosts. Its business model developed as a subscription-based SaaS service, with pricing linked to the number of properties managed through the platform.

In 2020, the founders said that the platform was used to manage more than 50,000 properties in 120 countries. By April 2021, more than 70,000 vacation rental listings were managed through Smoobu.

On 1 March 2021, HS Holiday Search GmbH, a wholly owned subsidiary of HomeToGo, acquired Smoobu for €18.5 million. Smoobu subsequently became part of HomeToGo_PRO, the group's business-to-business software and services segment, which was renamed in 2024. HomeToGo reported that revenue from its Subscriptions & Services segment, which included Smoobu, increased by 48% to €35.1 million in 2023, with Smoobu identified as a major contributor to the increase. Jannik Abraham serves as managing director of Smoobu, alongside Jürgen Zoilo von Beyme Cortés.

In November 2025, Smoobu joined the Deutscher Ferienhausverband, the German association representing the holiday-home sector.

== Software ==
Smoobu provides property management and channel management software for vacation rental hosts. Its tools include reservation and calendar management, synchronization across booking platforms, guest communication, dynamic pricing and direct bookings.

The platform also includes a Dynamic Pricing tool and a Website Builder for creating direct-booking websites integrated with Smoobu's reservation and channel management system. Smoobu has also developed integrations with services including Operto and Minut.

In 2026, Smoobu was listed by Airbnb as a Preferred Software Partner. In the same year, the company published the annual Smoobu Insights report, How Hosts Will Win: Quality, Value, and Professionalization, which used internal booking data and external travel forecasts to examine trends in the vacation rental market.
