= Ebu Bekir Is =

German footballer (born 2008)

Personal information
- Date of birth: 1 October 2008 (age 18)
- Place of birth: Groß-Gerau, Germany
- Height: 1.79 m (5 ft 10 in)
- Position: Midfielder

Team information
- Current team: Eintracht Frankfurt II
- Number: 6

Youth career
- 2013–2017: SV Concordia Gernsheim
- 2017–2018: SC Viktoria 06 Griesheim
- 2018–2026: Eintracht Frankfurt

Senior career*
Years	Team	Apps	(Gls)
2024–	Eintracht Frankfurt II	36	(0)
2025–	Eintracht Frankfurt	0	(0)

International career^{‡}
2023–2024	Germany U16	5	(0)
2024–2025	Germany U17	14	(2)
2026–	Germany U19	6	(0)
- * Club domestic league appearances and goals as of 1 November 2026 ‡ National team caps and goals as of 23:45, 3 October 2026 (UTC)

Ebu Bekir Is (Turkish: İş; born 1 October 2008) is a German professional footballer who plays for Eintracht Frankfurt II as a midfielder.

== Career ==
Bekir is a product of the youth academies of SV Concordia Gernsheim, SC Viktoria 06 Griesheim and Eintracht Frankfurt. He was promoted to Eintracht Frankfurt's reserves in 2024, and was their youngest ever debutant at the age of 16 years, one month and 29 days. On 28 November 2024, he signed his first prorifessional contract with Eintracht Frankfurt until 2027, with an option to extend until 2028. He made the senior matchday squad for the first time for a UEFA Europa League match against Lyon on 12 December 2024. He made his senior and professional debut with Eintracht Frankfurt as a substitute in a Europa League loss to Roma on 30 January 2025.

== International career ==
Born in Groß-Gerau, Germany, Bekir is of Turkish descent. He is a youth international for Germany, having played 10 times between the Germany U16s and Germany U17s. He participated in the 2025 FIFA U-17 World Cup with the U17s.
