= Kauã Santos =

Brazilian footballer (born 2003)

Personal information
- Full name: Kauã Morais Vieira dos Santos
- Date of birth: 11 April 2003 (age 23)
- Place of birth: Vassouras, Brazil
- Height: 1.98 m (6 ft 6 in)
- Position: Goalkeeper

Team information
- Current team: Eintracht Frankfurt
- Number: 40

Youth career
- Pedreira Vassouras
- –2020: Volta Redonda
- 2020–2023: Flamengo

Senior career*
Years	Team	Apps	(Gls)
2023–2024	Eintracht Frankfurt II	13	(0)
2024–	Eintracht Frankfurt	22	(0)

International career
2022–2023	Brazil U20	2	(0)
- * Club domestic league appearances and goals as of 1 March 2026

Kauã Morais Vieira dos Santos (born 11 April 2003) is a Brazilian footballer who plays as a goalkeeper for Bundesliga club Eintracht Frankfurt.

== Early career ==
Santos started playing football at the age of five. He played for the youth team of Volta Redonda and had a trial at Atlético Mineiro. Santos joined Flamengo's youth system in 2020, aged 17. He quickly stood out, signing a contract with the club until February 2024.

== Club career ==
In 2023, Santos signed for Bundesliga side Eintracht Frankfurt. He made his debut on 14 September 2024 against Wolfsburg and helped the team to a 2–1 win.

== International career ==
Santos represented Brazil at under-20 level. He participated in the 2023 South American U-20 Championship, where his team finished first.

== Personal life ==
Santos is a native of Vassouras, Brazil.

== Career statistics ==
As of match played 21 August 2026

Appearances and goals by club, season and competition
Club	Season	League			National cup		Continental		Total	
Club	Season	Division	Apps	Goals	Apps	Goals	Apps	Goals	Apps	Goals
Eintracht Frankfurt II	2023–24	Regionalliga Südwest	13	0	—		—		13	0
Eintracht Frankfurt	2023–24	Bundesliga	0	0	0	0	—		0	0
Eintracht Frankfurt	2024–25	Bundesliga	9	0	0	0	5 (Note: Appearances in UEFA Europa League)	0	14	0
Eintracht Frankfurt	2025–26	Bundesliga	13	0	0	0	3 (Note: Appearances in UEFA Champions League)	0	16	0
Eintracht Frankfurt	2026–27	Bundesliga	0	0	1	0	—		1	0
Eintracht Frankfurt	Total		22	0	1	0	8	0	31	0
Career total			35	0	1	0	8	0	44	0
