= Qype =

Hamburg social networking company

Qype GmbH
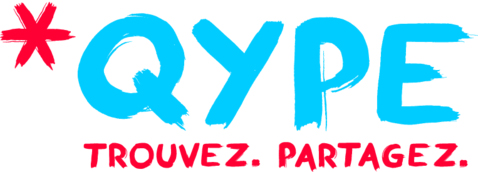
- Type: Private
- Industry: Business ratings and reviews
- Founded: March 2006
- Fate: Bought by Yelp, Inc.
- Headquarters: Hamburg, Germany
- Key people: Stephan Uhrenbacher, Founder, CEO from 2006-2010 and Board Member from 2010-13 Founder; Ian Brotherston CEO 2010-2013,
- Products: Qype.com
- Number of employees: approx. 160
- Website: www.qype.com

Qype /ˈkwaɪp/ was a Hamburg-based web 2.0 company centred on social networking and local reviews. They operated websites in Germany, the United Kingdom, France, Switzerland, Austria, Ireland, Poland, Spain, Italy and Brazil, and had approximately 22 million monthly unique European visitors.

Competitor Yelp announced their acquisition of Qype in October 2012 for a reported US$50 million. Qype reviews were merged into the Yelp site by October 2013.

== Company history ==
Qype was founded in March 2006 by Stephan Uhrenbacher for the German market. The initial funding came from Partech Ventures (Paris) and Advent Ventures (London).

In July 2007, Qype UK was launched, adding English to the interface and content. In January 2008, the website was translated into French, in anticipation of the launch of Qype France. Subsequent versions were released through 2011, including localized versions of the site for Spain, Ireland, Austria and Brazil.

Qype provided incentives for users to write reviews including giving away iPod Shuffles and Amazon vouchers.

== Site features ==
Qype hosted an online database of user-generated reviews of local businesses in Europe. Users could add new places to the database, upload photos, review places and engage in community activities, such as member events at local bars and restaurants, as well as B2C events for Qype members.

== Members ==
Qype offered a directory for anyone to search for businesses. Certain features, such as the ability to contribute a review, or add a comment to a discussion, were available only to users with verified accounts, which were free. Business owners could also participate in the site as well by contributing company profiles.

User profiles included a standard set of attributes such as photographs and several fields relating to the user's location, hobbies, and preferences.

== Scope of reviews ==
Users could review any local business, but also places of interest such as public gardens and beaches. In a high-usage city such as Hamburg or Berlin, London or Paris, a large percentage of all restaurants, bars and retail stores were listed with numerous reviews and there was considerable competition among users to be the "first to review" a new establishment (for which the user also received an extra feedback point). There was also considerable coverage of professional services, medical providers, automotive services, cultural venues, hotels, museums, parks, attractions, government services, etc. Users could add new businesses and update business information if they notice any missing or incorrect coverage.
