= Wimdu =

WIMDU
- Headquarters: Berlin
- Owner: HomeToGo Group; Rocket Internet
- Website: wimdu.com
- Commercial: Yes
- Launched: March 2011; 15 years ago
- Current status: Online
- Written in: Ruby on Rails

Wimdu, powered by HomeToGo, is an online marketplace for booking lodging, accessible by website and mobile app for iOS and Android. The company does not own any lodging; it is merely a broker and receives commissions from every booking. It is set up as a "clone" of similar websites. Wimdu searches and redirects users to the website that has the relationship with the lodging provider such as Expedia, Booking.com, HomeAway, Vrbo, Hotels.com, TripAdvisor, FlipKey, and Airbnb.

== History ==
The company was founded in 2010 and launched in March 2011. Wimdu was registered as a limited company (Gesellschaft mit beschränkter Haftung, GmbH) in March 2011.

Arne Bleckwenn and Hinrich Dreiling, the founders of Wimdu, previously founded and managed several other startups.

In June 2011, it received $90 million in investments from Kinnevik AB, which invested €25 million, and Rocket Internet. At the time, it was the largest investment in a European startup ever.

By May 2011, Wimdu was available in 11 languages.

In May 2011, Wimdu launched a spin-off business for the China market called Airizu.

Shortly after the launch of Wimdu, Airbnb publicity criticized the business model, writing

"A new type of scam has been brought to our attention: Airbnb clones posing as competition. We’ve discovered that these scam artists have a history of copying a website, aggressively poaching from their community, then attempting to sell the company back to the original."

Airbnb considered acquiring Wimdu, but decided against it as Airbnb was uncomfortable with Wimdu's culture and tactics.

By September 2011, the site was available in 16 languages and offered 25,000 lodging options in more than 100 countries.

In December 2011, WirtschaftsWoche rated Wimdu among the most important startups of 2011.

By 2012, Wimdu claimed to be the biggest social accommodation website from Europe. After the first year in business, Wimdu had booking revenues of $6.6 million per month.

In September 2012, due to rising costs, the company fundamentally changed its growth strategy. Activities of international offices were reduced and some employees moved back to the Berlin headquarters.

In 2013, Wimdu closed its separate China subsidiary Airizu.

Peer-to-peer property rental companies faced new regulatory requirements beginning in 2013 in Germany.

Wimdu continued its operations in Berlin despite 9flats shutting down its Berlin offices.

In January 2013, Rocket Internet evaluated selling the company.

In October 2014, the founders Arne Bleckwenn and Hinrich Dreiling left their positions at Wimdu at their own requests, taking positions on the advisory board. The management was handed over to Arne Kahlke und Sören Kress,

In November 2014, Wimdu expanded its activities at its Berlin headquarters.

From 2013 to 2014, bookings on Wimdu increased by 31%. In the first quarter of 2015, sales were up 34%.

In February 2015, Italian conglomerate Mediaset and Wimdu signed a media for equity deal. Mediaset invested "several million euros" in Wimdu and gave it advertising on the Mediaset TV channels. The investment funded expansion and by April 2012, Wimdu expanded in Italy, Spain and other Southern European countries.

In April 2016, Berlin adopted a law that restricted private apartment rentals. Wimdu then filed a lawsuit against the law, arguing that the law illegally restricts the fundamental rights of hosts.

In October 2016, the company announced a merger with 9flats. In October 2016, 9flats acquired the company.

In December 2016, it was sold to Wyndham Destinations's Novasol brand of Denmark.

In August 2017, the company had 12,000 listings in Germany, compared to 160,000 for Airbnb.

In May 2018, NovaSol was acquired by Platinum Equity.

In September 2018, it was announced that the website would shut down by the end of the year and all employees were fired.

The company is now part of the HomeToGo Group, also owned by Rocket Internet.

== Controversies ==
Rocket Internet, which is led by the Samwer brothers and was invested heavily in Wimdu, is renowned for its aggressive entrepreneurship and leadership style.

Wimdu has been accused several times of being a clone of Airbnb.

Wimdu offers a "hotel light" experience in a market where Airbnb has the "first mover advantage". Airbnb and Wimdu are competitors, especially in German-speaking Europe.

In January 2016, Wimdu was accused of not assisting hosts with vandalism and Wimdu refused to compensate the owner of a Berlin apartment that had been destroyed, beyond offering a dedicated "insurance" for such damages. Wimdu denied the allegations and pointed out that the host had demanded an "excessive refund" in this case. Die Zeit invited experts to check the standard form contract, which was deemed to be unsatisfactory.

On 30 May 2016, a Dutch TV program, Groeten van Max, showed fake images used to advertise lodging. Wimdu refused to comment and expelled the inquirers from its offices.

In April 2018, Paris filed a lawsuit against Wimdu and Airbnb for allowing listings of lodging without specific registration numbers.
