= Svarte =

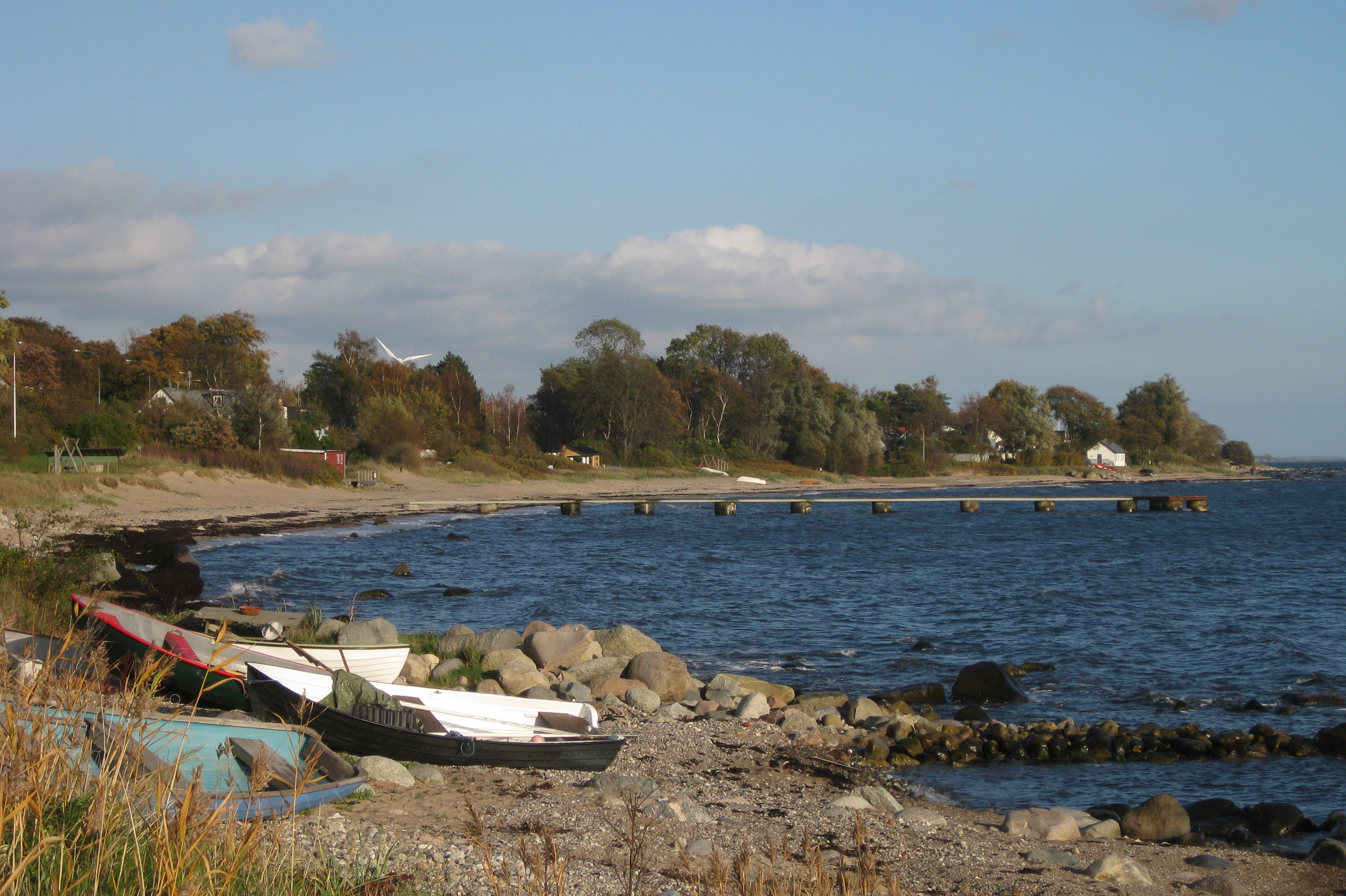
- The coastline at Svarte

- Location within Skåne Location within Sweden
- Coordinates: 55°25′N 13°43′E
- Country: Sweden
- Province: Skåne
- County: Skåne County
- Municipality: Ystad Municipality

Area
  - Total: 0.62 km^{2} (0.24 sq mi)

Population (31 December 2010)
  - Total: 902
  - Density: 1,446/km^{2} (3,750/sq mi)
- Time zone: UTC+1 (CET)
  - Summer (DST): UTC+2 (CEST)

Svarte is a locality situated in Ystad Municipality, Skåne County, Sweden with 902 inhabitants in 2010.
