= HomeToGo =

Online marketplace for vacation rentals

- Traded as: HTG
- ISIN: LU2290523658
- Founded: 2014
- Founder: Patrick Andrae, Wolfgang Heigl, Nils Regge
- Headquarters: Berlin, Germany
- Key people: Dr. Patrick Andrae (CEO), Wolfgang Heigl (CSO), Valentin Gruber (COO), Sebastian Bielski (CFO)
- Revenue: Booking Revenues: EUR €259.7 million (2024) IFRS Revenues: EUR €212.3 million (2024)
- Number of employees: 1500+
- Subsidiaries: Agriturismo.it, AMIVAC, Atraveo, Casamundo, CaseVacanza.it, e-domizil, EscapadaRural, Feries, GetAway, Interhome, Kraushaar, Kurz Mal Weg, Kurzurlaub, SECRA, Smoobu, timwork, Tripping.com, Wimdu
- Website: hometogo.de

HomeToGo is a Berlin-based company that combines a B2B Software & tech-enabled Service segment, HomeToGo_PRO, with an AI-powered B2C marketplace. HomeToGo operates in 30 countries across Europe, North America, South America, Australia, and the Asia-Pacific region.

== History ==
HomeToGo was founded in Berlin, Germany, in 2014 by Patrick Andrae, Wolfgang Heigl, and Nils Regge. Heigl had previously founded the flight search engine Swoodoo, which was later acquired by Kayak, while Regge had founded Casamundo, a vacation rental company that was also acquired by HomeToGo. The company's initial focus was on building a large-scale vacation rental search platform by aggregating listings from various providers.

In 2017, the company evolved into a marketplace offering direct bookings on its platform.

In 2018, HomeToGo made a series of acquisitions, including vacation home portals Wimdu and Casamundo, and later tripping.com, a U.S.-based vacation rental search engine. The company also acquired Agriturismo.it and CaseVacanza.it in Italy and EscapadaRural in Spain.

In September 2021, HomeToGo went public on the Frankfurt Stock Exchange through the company's shell Lakestar SPAC I. The listing valued HomeToGo at €1.2 billion and generated approximately €250 million in new capital.

In 2021, HomeToGo acquired the SaaS provider Smoobu.

In 2022, HomeToGo expanded its operations in France through the acquisition of the vacation rental business unit of Groupe Seloger, including brands such as AMIVAC. Amivac is a French vacation rental platform founded in 2002. It connects travelers with private and professional property owners and operates on a subscription-based model without charging booking fees to guests. The platform receives about six million visits annually and offers rental listings in France and other countries.

HomeToGo also acquired e-domizil and atraveo, as well as the travel tech provider, SECRA in 2022.

In 2023, HomeToGo launched its AI-powered travel planner, AI Mode, which uses generative AI to offer personalized vacation rental recommendations. Following the launch of a beta-version of the Chatbot AI Sunny, HomeToGo released plans in 2024 to develop an artificial intelligence travel assistant - Super AI Sunny - as part of its vision to become a fully AI-driven marketplace.

In 2024, HomeToGo acquired a 51% majority stake in KMW Reisen and Super Urlaub, including the brands Kurz Mal Weg and Kurzurlaub, which specialize in thematic short-trip travel bundles.

In 2025, HomeToGo announced its acquisition of Interhome, Europe’s second-largest vacation rental management company, from Migros. With this transaction, HomeToGo_PRO became the company’s largest business segment, marking a strategic shift of the HomeToGo Group towards a B2B focus.

== Overview ==
HomeToGo operates two segments: Its Marketplace and HomeToGo_PRO. HomeToGo_PRO is a business-to-business (B2B) segment offering software and services for property managers and vacation rental providers. In 2020, it launched services for managing listings across platforms, rebranding to HomeToGo_PRO in December 2023, offering subscriptions and services for the vacation rental supply side.

The HomeToGo Marketplace is an AI-powered business-to-consumer (B2C) platform that provides access to the world’s largest selection of vacation rentals through its websites and apps, allowing users to search and book properties. HomeToGo earns revenue from booking commissions as well as direct bookings.

== Product ==
On the company's websites and apps, users can search through more than 20 million vacation home listings from over 60,000 different providers using various search criteria such as destination, travel dates, price, or amenities. In many cases, the selected accommodation can be booked directly through HomeToGo.

Vacation rental providers and third-party companies have the opportunity to market their vacation rentals via HomeToGo, with HomeToGo acting as an intermediary. HomeToGo receives a market dependent commission for bookings or generated traffic.

In 2023, HomeToGo launched its AI-powered travel planner, AI Mode, which uses generative AI to offer personalized vacation rental recommendations.

In 2024, HomeToGo launched AI Sunny, its AI-powered travel assistant.

In 2025, HomeToGo launched AI Filter, its AI-powered search filter. In addition, the company offers AI features integrated directly into its platform such as Smart AI Reviews, AI-summarized reviews from trusted guests, and Smart AI Offer Summaries, AI-summarized offer descriptions.

== Smoobu ==
Smoobu is a Berlin-based provider of software-as-a-service property management and channel management tools for vacation rental hosts, and part of the HomeToGo Group. Registered in Berlin in August 2014, it was co-founded by Fabian Beckers and Philipp Reuter, who positioned it as an affordable channel manager for independent vacation rental hosts. Today, Smoobu is led by Managing Directors Jannik Abraham and Jürgen von Beyme Cortés.

By April 2021, the platform powered more than 70,000 listings worldwide. On 1 March 2021, HomeToGo's subsidiary HS Holiday Search GmbH acquired 100 per cent of the shares in Smoobu GmbH. It continued to operate under its own brand and became one of the constituent brands of the HomeToGo_PRO segment created in December 2023.

The platform combines a channel manager, a property management system with a unified inbox and online check-in, a direct booking engine and website builder, and a dynamic pricing tool; HomeToGo describes its customers as individual hosts independently managing properties, standalone or as part of a portfolio. Smoobu is listed among Booking.com's "Premier Plus" connectivity providers and among Airbnb's preferred software partners for 2026, marking the ninth consecutive year the company has earned the Airbnb distinction.
