= 2024–25 UEFA Europa League =

European football competition

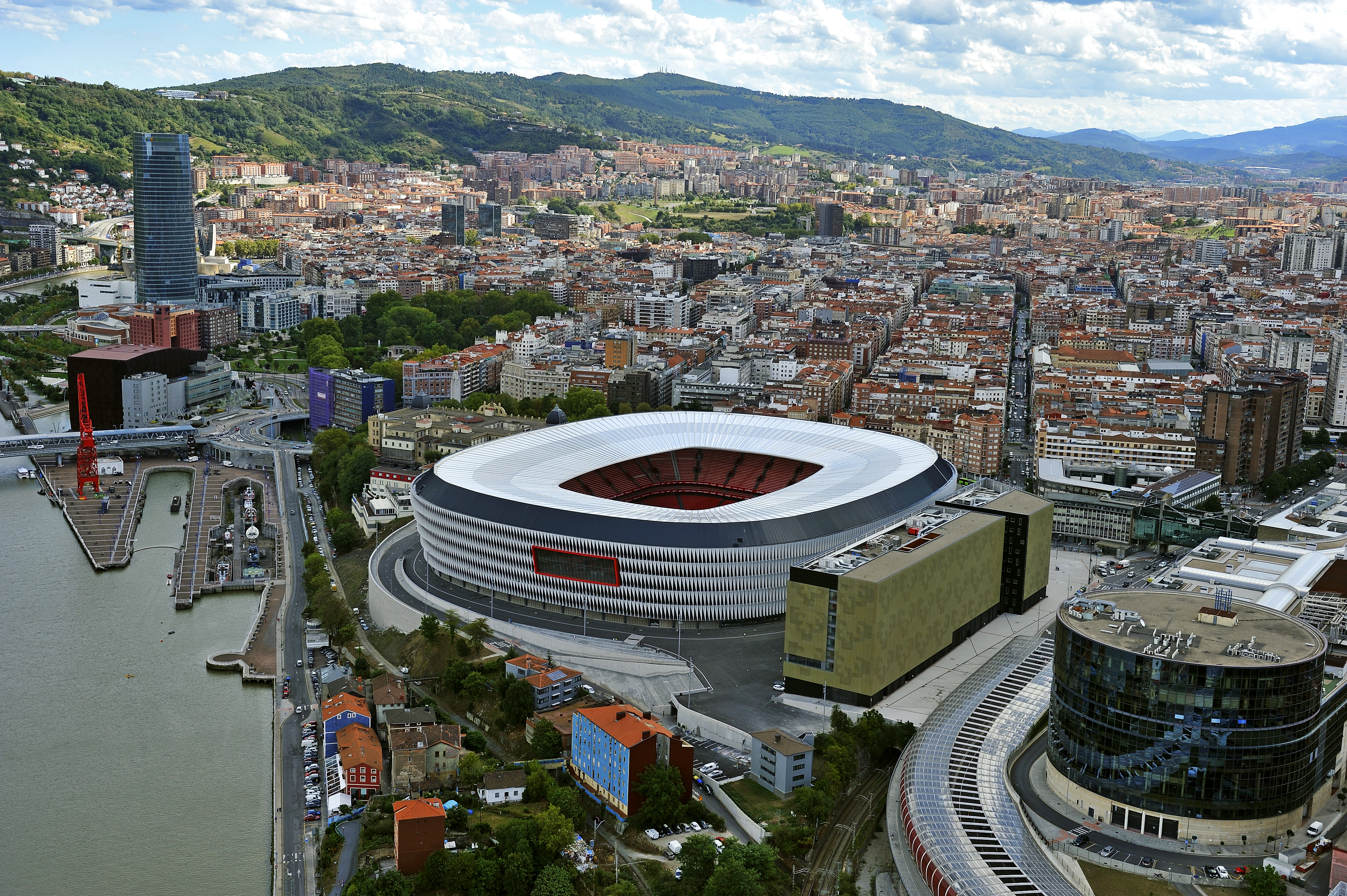
- The San Mamés Stadium in Bilbao hosted the final

Tournament details
- Dates: Qualifying: 11 July – 29 August 2024; Competition proper: 25 September 2024 – 21 May 2025
- Teams: Competition proper: 25+11; Total: 45+31 (from 41 associations)

Final positions
- Champions: (England) Tottenham Hotspur (3rd title)
- Runners-up: (England) Manchester United

Tournament statistics
- Matches played: 189
- Goals scored: 557 (2.95 per match)
- Attendance: 5,619,669 (29,734 per match)
- Top scorer(s): Ayoub El Kaabi (Olympiacos); Bruno Fernandes (Manchester United); Kasper Høgh (Bodø/Glimt); 7 goals each
- Best player: Cristian Romero (Tottenham Hotspur)
- Best young player: Rayan Cherki (Lyon)

The 2024–25 UEFA Europa League was the 54th season of Europe's secondary club football tournament organised by UEFA, and the 16th season since it was renamed from the UEFA Cup to the UEFA Europa League.

This was the first season played under a new format, which replaced the 32-team group stage with a 36-team league phase. This increased the total number of matches played in the competition (excluding qualifying rounds) from 141 to 189. The new format also did not allow teams to transfer from the Champions League league or knockout phase to the Europa League knockout phase; as the winner of the Europa League automatically qualifies for the Champions League league phase, the Europa League winners (Atalanta in the 2023–24 edition) could no longer defend their title.

The final was played at San Mamés Stadium in Bilbao, Spain, between English clubs Tottenham Hotspur and Manchester United. Tottenham won 1–0, with Brennan Johnson scoring the only goal of the game shortly before half-time, to win their third UEFA Cup/UEFA Europa League title and their first major trophy in 17 years. As the winners of the tournament, Tottenham Hotspur automatically qualified for the 2025–26 UEFA Champions League league phase and earned the right to play against 2024–25 UEFA Champions League winners Paris Saint-Germain in the 2025 UEFA Super Cup.

== Association team allocation ==
A total of 76 teams from 41 of the 55 UEFA member associations participated in the 2024–25 UEFA Europa League. Among them, 32 associations had teams directly qualifying for the Europa League, while for the other 23 associations that did not have any teams directly qualifying, 9 of them had teams playing after being transferred from the Champions League. The association ranking based on the UEFA association coefficients was used to determine the number of participating teams for each association:

- The title holders of the Europa Conference League were given an entry in the Europa League (if they did not qualify for the Champions League or Europa League via league position).
- Associations 1–12 each had two teams.
- Associations 13–33 (except Russia) each had one team.
- 31 teams eliminated from the 2024–25 Champions League were transferred to the Europa League.

=== Association ranking ===
For the 2024–25 UEFA Europa League, the associations were allocated places according to their 2023 UEFA association coefficients, which took into account their performance in European competitions from 2018–19 to 2022–23.

Apart from the allocation based on the association coefficients, associations could have additional teams participating in the Europa League, as noted below:

- (UCL) – Additional teams transferred from the UEFA Champions League
- (UECL) – Additional berth for 2023–24 UEFA Europa Conference League title holders

Association ranking for 2024–25 UEFA Europa League

Rank	Association	Coeff.	Teams	Notes
1	England	109.570	2	
2	Spain	92.998	2	
3	Germany	82.481	2	
4	Italy	81.926	2	
5	France	61.164	2	
6	Netherlands	59.900	2	+1 (UCL)
7	Portugal	56.216	2	
8	Belgium	42.200	2	+1 (UCL)
9	Scotland	36.400	2	+1 (UCL)
10	Austria	34.000	2	
11	Serbia	32.375	2	+1 (UCL)
12	Turkey	32.100	2	+2 (UCL)
13	Switzerland	31.675	1	+1 (UCL)
14	Ukraine	29.500	1	+1 (UCL)
15	Czech Republic	29.050	1	+1 (UCL)
16	Norway	29.000	1	+1 (UCL)
17	Denmark	27.825	1	+1 (UCL)
18	Russia	26.215	0	
19	Croatia	25.400	1	

Rank	Association	Coeff.	Teams	Notes
20	Greece	25.225	1	+1 (UECL) +1 (UCL)
21	Israel	25.000	1	+1 (UCL)
22	Cyprus	24.475	1	+1 (UCL)
23	Sweden	23.750	1	+1 (UCL)
24	Poland	20.750	1	+1 (UCL)
25	Hungary	20.625	1	+1 (UCL)
26	Romania	20.500	1	+1 (UCL)
27	Bulgaria	20.000	1	+1 (UCL)
28	Slovakia	19.750	1	
29	Azerbaijan	16.625	1	+1 (UCL)
30	Kazakhstan	12.625	1	
31	Slovenia	12.500	1	+1 (UCL)
32	Moldova	12.250	1	+1 (UCL)
33	Kosovo	11.041	1	
34	Liechtenstein	11.000	0	
35	Latvia	10.625	0	+1 (UCL)
36	Republic of Ireland	10.375	0	+1 (UCL)
37	Finland	10.200	0	

Rank	Association	Coeff.	Teams	Notes
38	Lithuania	10.000	0	+1 (UCL)
39	Armenia	9.875	0	
40	Belarus	9.875	0	+1 (UCL)
41	Bosnia and Herzegovina	9.750	0	+1 (UCL)
42	Luxembourg	9.000	0	
43	Faroe Islands	8.750	0	+1 (UCL)
44	Northern Ireland	8.583	0	
45	Malta	8.250	0	
46	Georgia	8.000	0	
47	Estonia	7.582	0	
48	Iceland	7.250	0	
49	Albania	6.250	0	
50	Wales	6.166	0	+1 (UCL)
51	Gibraltar	5.791	0	+1 (UCL)
52	North Macedonia	5.500	0	
53	Andorra	5.165	0	+1 (UCL)
54	Montenegro	4.750	0	
55	San Marino	1.999	0	

=== Distribution ===
		Teams entering in this round	Teams advancing from the previous round	Teams transferred from Champions League
First qualifying round (12 teams)		12 domestic cup winners from associations 22–33		
Second qualifying round (18 teams)		5 domestic cup winners from association 16–21 (except Russia); 6 domestic league third-placed teams from associations 7–12; 1 domestic league fourth-placed team from association 6	6 winners from the first qualifying round	
Third qualifying round (26 teams)	Champions Path (12 teams)			12 losers from Champions League second qualifying round (Champions Path)
Third qualifying round (26 teams)	League Path (14 teams)	3 domestic cup winners from associations 13–15	9 winners from second qualifying round	2 losers from Champions League second qualifying round (League Path)
Play-off round (24 teams)		5 domestic cup winners from associations 8–12	13 winners from third qualifying round	6 losers from Champions League third qualifying round (Champions Path)
League phase (36 teams)		Europa Conference League title holders; 7 domestic cup winners from associations 1–7; 5 domestic league fifth-placed teams from associations 1–5	12 winners from play-off round	5 losers from Champions League play-off round (Champions Path); 4 losers from Champions League third qualifying round (League Path); 2 losers from Champions League play-off round (League Path)
Knockout phase play-offs (16 teams)			16 teams ranked 9–24 from the league phase	
Round of 16 (16 teams)			8 teams ranked 1–8 from the league phase; 8 winners from the knockout phase play-offs	

The information here reflects the ongoing suspension of Russia in European football, and so the following changes to the default access were made:

- The cup winners of association 16 (Norway) will enter the second qualifying round instead of the first qualifying round.

As the Europa League title holders (Atalanta) qualified via their domestic league's standard berth allocation, the following changes to the default access list were made:

- The cup winners of associations 17 to 21 (except Russia) (Denmark, Croatia, Greece and Israel) will enter the second qualifying round instead of the first qualifying round.

=== Teams ===
The labels in the parentheses show how each team qualified for the place of its starting round:

- UECL: Europa Conference League title holders
- CW: Cup winners
- 3rd, 4th, 5th, etc.: League position of the previous season
- UCL: Transferred from the Champions League
  - CH/LP PO: Losers from the play-off round (Champions/League Path)
  - CH/LP Q3: Losers from the third qualifying round (Champions/League Path)
  - CH/LP Q2: Losers from the second qualifying round (Champions/League Path)

The third qualifying round was divided into Champions Path (CH) and Main Path (MP).

Qualified teams for 2024–25 UEFA Europa League
Entry round		Teams			
League phase		(Greece) Olympiacos (UECL)	(England) Manchester United (CW)	(England) Tottenham Hotspur (5th)	(Spain) Athletic Bilbao (CW)
League phase		(Spain) Real Sociedad (6th)	(Germany) Eintracht Frankfurt (6th)	(Germany) TSG Hoffenheim (7th)	(Italy) Roma (6th)
League phase		(Italy) Lazio (7th)	(France) Nice (5th)	(France) Lyon (6th)	(Netherlands) AZ (4th)
League phase		(Portugal) Porto (CW)	(Turkey) Galatasaray (UCL CH PO)	(Norway) Bodø/Glimt (UCL CH PO)	(Denmark) Midtjylland (UCL CH PO)
League phase		(Sweden) Malmö FF (UCL CH PO)	(Azerbaijan) Qarabağ (UCL CH PO)	(Ukraine) Dynamo Kyiv (UCL LP PO)	(Czech Republic) Slavia Prague (UCL LP PO)
League phase		(Netherlands) Twente (UCL LP Q3)	(Belgium) Union Saint-Gilloise (UCL LP Q3)	(Scotland) Rangers (UCL LP Q3)	(Turkey) Fenerbahçe (UCL LP Q3)
Play-off round		(Belgium) Anderlecht (3rd)	(Scotland) Heart of Midlothian (3rd)	(Austria) LASK (3rd)	(Serbia) TSC (3rd)
Play-off round		(Turkey) Beşiktaş (CW)	(Greece) PAOK (UCL CH Q3)	(Cyprus) APOEL (UCL CH Q3)	(Poland) Jagiellonia Białystok (UCL CH Q3)
Play-off round		(Hungary) Ferencváros (UCL CH Q3)	(Romania) FCSB (UCL CH Q3)	(Bulgaria) Ludogorets Razgrad (UCL CH Q3)	
Third qualifying round	CH	(Israel) Maccabi Tel Aviv (UCL CH Q2)	(Slovenia) Celje (UCL CH Q2)	(Moldova) Petrocub Hîncești (UCL CH Q2)	(Latvia) RFS (UCL CH Q2)
Third qualifying round	CH	(Republic of Ireland) Shamrock Rovers (UCL CH Q2)	(Lithuania) Panevėžys (UCL CH Q2)	(Belarus) Dinamo Minsk (UCL CH Q2)	(Bosnia and Herzegovina) Borac Banja Luka (UCL CH Q2)
Third qualifying round	CH	(Faroe Islands) KÍ (UCL CH Q2)	(Wales) The New Saints (UCL CH Q2)	(Gibraltar) Lincoln Red Imps (UCL CH Q2)	(Andorra) UE Santa Coloma (UCL CH Q2)
Third qualifying round	MP	(Switzerland) Servette (CW)	(Ukraine) Kryvbas Kryvyi Rih (3rd)	(Czech Republic) Viktoria Plzeň (3rd)	(Serbia) Partizan (UCL LP Q2)
Third qualifying round	MP	(Switzerland) Lugano (UCL LP Q2)			
Second qualifying round		(Netherlands) Ajax (5th)	(Portugal) Braga (4th)	(Belgium) Cercle Brugge (4th)	(Scotland) Kilmarnock (4th)
Second qualifying round		(Austria) Rapid Wien (4th)	(Serbia) Vojvodina (4th)	(Turkey) Trabzonspor (3rd)	(Norway) Molde (CW)
Second qualifying round		(Denmark) Silkeborg (CW)	(Croatia) Rijeka (2nd)	(Greece) Panathinaikos (CW)	(Israel) Maccabi Petah Tikva (CW)
First qualifying round		(Cyprus) Pafos (CW)	(Sweden) IF Elfsborg (2nd)	(Poland) Wisła Kraków (CW)	(Hungary) Paks (CW)
First qualifying round		(Romania) Corvinul Hunedoara (CW)	(Bulgaria) Botev Plovdiv (CW)	(Slovakia) Ružomberok (CW)	(Azerbaijan) Zira (2nd)
First qualifying round		(Kazakhstan) Tobol (CW)	(Slovenia) Maribor (2nd)	(Moldova) Sheriff Tiraspol (2nd)	(Kosovo) Llapi (2nd)

Two teams not playing in a national top division took part in the competition: Corvinul Hunedoara (2nd tier) and Wisła Kraków (2nd tier).

Notes

1. Russia (RUS): On 28 February 2022, Russian football clubs and national teams were suspended from FIFA and UEFA competitions due to the Russian invasion of Ukraine. The tables reflect Russia's ongoing suspension from UEFA competitions.
2. Slovenia (SVN): Cup winners Rogaška failed to obtain a UEFA licence, so the berth reserved for the cup winners was transferred to the second-placed team in the league, Maribor.

== Schedule ==
The schedule of the competition was as follows. Matches were scheduled for Thursdays, apart from the final, which took place on a Wednesday, though exceptionally could take place on Tuesdays or Wednesdays due to scheduling conflicts. Compared to past seasons, one exclusive week was introduced where both Wednesday and Thursdays were matchdays, held on 25 and 26 September.

Schedule for 2024–25 UEFA Europa League
Phase	Round	Draw date	First leg	Second leg
Qualifying	First qualifying round	18 June 2024	11 July 2024	18 July 2024
Qualifying	Second qualifying round	19 June 2024	25 July 2024	1 August 2024
Qualifying	Third qualifying round	22 July 2024	8 August 2024	15 August 2024
Play-offs	Play-off round	5 August 2024	22 August 2024	29 August 2024
League phase	Matchday 1	30 August 2024	25–26 September 2024	
League phase	Matchday 2	30 August 2024	3 October 2024	
League phase	Matchday 3	30 August 2024	24 October 2024	
League phase	Matchday 4	30 August 2024	7 November 2024	
League phase	Matchday 5	30 August 2024	28 November 2024	
League phase	Matchday 6	30 August 2024	12 December 2024	
League phase	Matchday 7	30 August 2024	23 January 2025	
League phase	Matchday 8	30 August 2024	30 January 2025	
Knockout phase	Knockout phase play-offs	31 January 2025	13 February 2025	20 February 2025
Knockout phase	Round of 16	21 February 2025	6 March 2025	13 March 2025
Knockout phase	Quarter-finals	21 February 2025	10 April 2025	17 April 2025
Knockout phase	Semi-finals	21 February 2025	1 May 2025	8 May 2025
Knockout phase	Final	—N/a	21 May 2025 at San Mamés Stadium, Bilbao	

== Qualifying rounds ==
=== First qualifying round ===
The draw for the first qualifying round was held on 18 June 2024. The first legs were played on 11 July, and the second legs were played on 18 July 2024.

The winners of the ties advanced to the second qualifying round. The losers were transferred to the Conference League Main Path second qualifying round.

First qualifying round
Team 1	Agg.	Team 2	1st leg	2nd leg
Botev Plovdiv (Bulgaria)	4–3	(Slovenia) Maribor	2–1	2–2
IF Elfsborg (Sweden)	8–2	(Cyprus) Pafos	3–0	5–2
Paks (Hungary)	2–4	(Romania) Corvinul Hunedoara	0–4	2–0
Sheriff Tiraspol (Moldova)	2–2 (5–4 p)	(Azerbaijan) Zira	0–1	2–1 (a.e.t.)
Wisła Kraków (Poland)	4–1 (Note: Order of legs reversed after original draw.)	(Kosovo) Llapi	2–0	2–1
Ružomberok (Slovakia)	5–3	(Kazakhstan) Tobol	5–2	0–1

=== Second qualifying round ===
The draw for the second qualifying round was held on 19 June 2024. The first legs were played on 25 July, and the second legs were played on 1 August 2024.

The winners of the ties advanced to the Main Path third qualifying round. The losers were transferred to the Conference League Main Path third qualifying round.

Second qualifying round
Team 1	Agg.	Team 2	1st leg	2nd leg
Ajax (Netherlands)	4–1	(Serbia) Vojvodina	1–0	3–1
Ružomberok (Slovakia)	0–3	(Turkey) Trabzonspor	0–2	0–1
Wisła Kraków (Poland)	2–8	(Austria) Rapid Wien	1–2	1–6
Kilmarnock (Scotland)	1–2	(Belgium) Cercle Brugge	1–1	0–1
Molde (Norway)	5–4	(Denmark) Silkeborg	3–1	2–3
Corvinul Hunedoara (Romania)	0–1	(Croatia) Rijeka	0–0	0–1
Braga (Portugal)	7–0	(Israel) Maccabi Petah Tikva	2–0	5–0
Panathinaikos (Greece)	6–1	(Bulgaria) Botev Plovdiv	2–1	4–0
Sheriff Tiraspol (Moldova)	0–3	(Sweden) IF Elfsborg	0–1	0–2

=== Third qualifying round ===
The draw for the third qualifying round was held on 22 July 2024. The first legs were played on 6 and 8 August, and the second legs were played on 13, 14 and 15 August 2024.

The winners of the ties advanced to the play-off round. The Champions Path losers were transferred to the Conference League Champions Path play-off round, while the Main Path losers were transferred to the Conference League Main Path play-off round.

Third qualifying round
Team 1	Agg.	Team 2	1st leg	2nd leg
Champions Path
KÍ (Faroe Islands)	3–4	(Bosnia and Herzegovina) Borac Banja Luka	2–1	1–3 (a.e.t.)
UE Santa Coloma (Andorra)	0–9	(Latvia) RFS	0–2	0–7
Celje (Slovenia)	2–3	(Republic of Ireland) Shamrock Rovers	1–0	1–3 (a.e.t.)
Panevėžys (Lithuania)	1–5	(Israel) Maccabi Tel Aviv	1–2	0–3
Petrocub Hîncești (Moldova)	1–0	(Wales) The New Saints	1–0	0–0
Dinamo Minsk (Belarus)	3–2	(Gibraltar) Lincoln Red Imps	2–0	1–2
Main Path
Partizan (Serbia)	2–3	(Switzerland) Lugano	0–1	2–2 (a.e.t.)
Molde (Norway)	3–1	(Belgium) Cercle Brugge	3–0	0–1
Panathinaikos (Greece)	1–1 (12–13 p)	(Netherlands) Ajax	0–1	1–0 (a.e.t.)
Trabzonspor (Turkey)	0–3	(Austria) Rapid Wien	0–1	0–2
Braga (Portugal)	2–1	(Switzerland) Servette	0–0	2–1
Rijeka (Croatia)	1–3	(Sweden) IF Elfsborg	1–1	0–2
Kryvbas Kryvyi Rih (Ukraine)	1–3	(Czech Republic) Viktoria Plzeň	1–2	0–1

== Play-off round ==
The draw for the play-off round was held on 5 August 2024. The first legs were played on 22 August, and the second legs were played on 29 August 2024.

The winners of the ties advanced to the league phase. The losers were transferred to the Conference League league phase.

Play-off round
Team 1	Agg.	Team 2	1st leg	2nd leg
Dinamo Minsk (Belarus)	0–2	(Belgium) Anderlecht	0–1	0–1
Jagiellonia Białystok (Poland)	1–7	(Netherlands) Ajax	1–4	0–3
Ludogorets Razgrad (Bulgaria)	6–1	(Moldova) Petrocub Hîncești	4–0	2–1
Lugano (Switzerland)	4–8	(Turkey) Beşiktaş	3–3	1–5
LASK (Austria)	1–2	(Romania) FCSB	1–1	0–1
RFS (Latvia)	3–3 (4–2 p)	(Cyprus) APOEL	2–1	1–2 (a.e.t.)
Maccabi Tel Aviv (Israel)	8–1	(Serbia) TSC	3–0	5–1
PAOK (Greece)	6–0	(Republic of Ireland) Shamrock Rovers	4–0	2–0
Ferencváros (Hungary)	1–1 (3–2 p)	(Bosnia and Herzegovina) Borac Banja Luka	0–0	1–1 (a.e.t.)
Molde (Norway)	1–1 (2–4 p)	(Sweden) IF Elfsborg	0–1	1–0 (a.e.t.)
Braga (Portugal)	4–3	(Austria) Rapid Wien	2–1	2–2
Viktoria Plzeň (Czech Republic)	2–0	(Scotland) Heart of Midlothian	1–0	1–0

== League phase ==
Location of teams of the 2024–25 UEFA Europa League league phase
Location of Netherlands teams of the 2024–25 UEFA Europa League league phase.

The league phase draw for the 2024–25 UEFA Europa League took place at the Grimaldi Forum in Monaco on 30 August 2024, 13:00 CEST. The 36 teams were divided into four pots of nine teams each based on their UEFA club coefficient.

The 36 teams were manually drawn and then automated software digitally drew their eight different opponents at random, determining which of their matches were at home and which ones away. Each team faced two opponents from each of the four pots, one at home and one away. Teams could not face opponents from their own association, and could only be drawn against a maximum of two sides from the same association.

RFS made their debut appearance since the introduction of the group stage.

A total of 22 national associations were represented in the league phase.

=== Table ===
Pos	Team	Pld	W	D	L	GF	GA	GD	Pts	Qualification
1	(Italian Football Federation) Lazio	8	6	1	1	17	5	+12	19	Advance to round of 16 (seeded)
2	(Royal Spanish Football Federation) Athletic Bilbao	8	6	1	1	15	7	+8	19	Advance to round of 16 (seeded)
3	(The Football Association) Manchester United	8	5	3	0	16	9	+7	18	Advance to round of 16 (seeded)
4	(The Football Association) Tottenham Hotspur	8	5	2	1	17	9	+8	17	Advance to round of 16 (seeded)
5	(German Football Association) Eintracht Frankfurt	8	5	1	2	14	10	+4	16	Advance to round of 16 (seeded)
6	(French Football Federation) Lyon	8	4	3	1	16	8	+8	15	Advance to round of 16 (seeded)
7	(Hellenic Football Federation) Olympiacos	8	4	3	1	9	3	+6	15	Advance to round of 16 (seeded)
8	(Scottish Football Association) Rangers	8	4	2	2	16	10	+6	14	Advance to round of 16 (seeded)
9	(Norwegian Football Federation) Bodø/Glimt	8	4	2	2	14	11	+3	14	Advance to knockout phase play-offs (seeded)
10	(Royal Belgian Football Association) Anderlecht	8	4	2	2	14	12	+2	14	Advance to knockout phase play-offs (seeded)
11	(Romanian Football Federation) FCSB	8	4	2	2	10	9	+1	14	Advance to knockout phase play-offs (seeded)
12	(Royal Dutch Football Association) Ajax	8	4	1	3	16	8	+8	13	Advance to knockout phase play-offs (seeded)
13	(Royal Spanish Football Federation) Real Sociedad	8	4	1	3	13	9	+4	13	Advance to knockout phase play-offs (seeded)
14	(Turkish Football Federation) Galatasaray	8	3	4	1	19	16	+3	13	Advance to knockout phase play-offs (seeded)
15	(Italian Football Federation) Roma	8	3	3	2	10	6	+4	12	Advance to knockout phase play-offs (seeded)
16	(Football Association of the Czech Republic) Viktoria Plzeň	8	3	3	2	13	12	+1	12	Advance to knockout phase play-offs (seeded)
17	(Hungarian Football Federation) Ferencváros	8	4	0	4	15	15	0	12	Advance to knockout phase play-offs (unseeded)
18	(Portuguese Football Federation) Porto	8	3	2	3	13	11	+2	11	Advance to knockout phase play-offs (unseeded)
19	(Royal Dutch Football Association) AZ	8	3	2	3	13	13	0	11	Advance to knockout phase play-offs (unseeded)
20	(Danish Football Association) Midtjylland	8	3	2	3	9	9	0	11	Advance to knockout phase play-offs (unseeded)
21	(Royal Belgian Football Association) Union Saint-Gilloise	8	3	2	3	8	8	0	11	Advance to knockout phase play-offs (unseeded)
22	(Hellenic Football Federation) PAOK	8	3	1	4	12	10	+2	10	Advance to knockout phase play-offs (unseeded)
23	(Royal Dutch Football Association) Twente	8	2	4	2	8	9	−1	10	Advance to knockout phase play-offs (unseeded)
24	(Turkish Football Federation) Fenerbahçe	8	2	4	2	9	11	−2	10	Advance to knockout phase play-offs (unseeded)
25	(Portuguese Football Federation) Braga	8	3	1	4	9	12	−3	10	
26	(Swedish Football Association) IF Elfsborg	8	3	1	4	9	14	−5	10	
27	(German Football Association) TSG Hoffenheim	8	2	3	3	11	14	−3	9	
28	(Turkish Football Federation) Beşiktaş	8	3	0	5	10	15	−5	9	
29	(Israel Football Association) Maccabi Tel Aviv	8	2	0	6	8	17	−9	6	
30	(Football Association of the Czech Republic) Slavia Prague	8	1	2	5	7	11	−4	5	
31	(Swedish Football Association) Malmö FF	8	1	2	5	10	17	−7	5	
32	(Latvian Football Federation) RFS	8	1	2	5	6	13	−7	5	
33	(Bulgarian Football Union) Ludogorets Razgrad	8	0	4	4	4	11	−7	4	
34	(Ukrainian Association of Football) Dynamo Kyiv	8	1	1	6	5	18	−13	4	
35	(French Football Federation) Nice	8	0	3	5	7	16	−9	3	
36	(Association of Football Federations of Azerbaijan) Qarabağ	8	1	0	7	6	20	−14	3	

Source: UEFA
Rules for classification: League phase tiebreakers

=== Results ===
Matchday 1
Home team	Score	Away team
AZ (Netherlands)	3–2	(Sweden) IF Elfsborg
Bodø/Glimt (Norway)	3–2	(Portugal) Porto
Dynamo Kyiv (Ukraine)	0–3	(Italy) Lazio
Midtjylland (Denmark)	1–1	(Germany) TSG Hoffenheim
Galatasaray (Turkey)	3–1	(Greece) PAOK
Manchester United (England)	1–1	(Netherlands) Twente
Nice (France)	1–1	(Spain) Real Sociedad
Ludogorets Razgrad (Bulgaria)	0–2	(Czech Republic) Slavia Prague
Anderlecht (Belgium)	2–1	(Hungary) Ferencváros
Fenerbahçe (Turkey)	2–1	(Belgium) Union Saint-Gilloise
Malmö FF (Sweden)	0–2	(Scotland) Rangers
Ajax (Netherlands)	4–0	(Turkey) Beşiktaş
Roma (Italy)	1–1	(Spain) Athletic Bilbao
Eintracht Frankfurt (Germany)	3–3	(Czech Republic) Viktoria Plzeň
FCSB (Romania)	4–1	(Latvia) RFS
Lyon (France)	2–0	(Greece) Olympiacos
Braga (Portugal)	2–1	(Israel) Maccabi Tel Aviv
Tottenham Hotspur (England)	3–0	(Azerbaijan) Qarabağ

Matchday 2
Home team	Score	Away team
RFS (Latvia)	2–2	(Turkey) Galatasaray
Ferencváros (Hungary)	1–2	(England) Tottenham Hotspur
Maccabi Tel Aviv (Israel)	0–2	(Denmark) Midtjylland
Olympiacos (Greece)	3–0	(Portugal) Braga
Qarabağ (Azerbaijan)	1–2	(Sweden) Malmö FF
Real Sociedad (Spain)	1–2	(Belgium) Anderlecht
Lazio (Italy)	4–1	(France) Nice
Slavia Prague (Czech Republic)	1–1	(Netherlands) Ajax
TSG Hoffenheim (Germany)	2–0	(Ukraine) Dynamo Kyiv
Athletic Bilbao (Spain)	2–0	(Netherlands) AZ
Beşiktaş (Turkey)	1–3	(Germany) Eintracht Frankfurt
Porto (Portugal)	3–3	(England) Manchester United
Twente (Netherlands)	1–1	(Turkey) Fenerbahçe
Viktoria Plzeň (Czech Republic)	0–0	(Bulgaria) Ludogorets Razgrad
IF Elfsborg (Sweden)	1–0	(Italy) Roma
PAOK (Greece)	0–1	(Romania) FCSB
Union Saint-Gilloise (Belgium)	0–0	(Norway) Bodø/Glimt
Rangers (Scotland)	1–4	(France) Lyon

Matchday 3
Home team	Score	Away team
Galatasaray (Turkey)	4–3	(Sweden) IF Elfsborg
Braga (Portugal)	1–2	(Norway) Bodø/Glimt
Roma (Italy)	1–0	(Ukraine) Dynamo Kyiv
Eintracht Frankfurt (Germany)	1–0	(Latvia) RFS
Midtjylland (Denmark)	1–0	(Belgium) Union Saint-Gilloise
Ferencváros (Hungary)	1–0	(France) Nice
Maccabi Tel Aviv (Israel)	1–2	(Spain) Real Sociedad
PAOK (Greece)	2–2	(Czech Republic) Viktoria Plzeň
Qarabağ (Azerbaijan)	0–3	(Netherlands) Ajax
Athletic Bilbao (Spain)	1–0	(Czech Republic) Slavia Prague
Porto (Portugal)	2–0	(Germany) TSG Hoffenheim
Twente (Netherlands)	0–2	(Italy) Lazio
Fenerbahçe (Turkey)	1–1	(England) Manchester United
Malmö FF (Sweden)	0–1	(Greece) Olympiacos
Lyon (France)	0–1	(Turkey) Beşiktaş
Rangers (Scotland)	4–0	(Romania) FCSB
Anderlecht (Belgium)	2–0	(Bulgaria) Ludogorets Razgrad
Tottenham Hotspur (England)	1–0	(Netherlands) AZ

Matchday 4
Home team	Score	Away team
Beşiktaş (Turkey)	2–1	(Sweden) Malmö FF
Eintracht Frankfurt (Germany)	1–0	(Czech Republic) Slavia Prague
Bodø/Glimt (Norway)	1–2	(Azerbaijan) Qarabağ
FCSB (Romania)	2–0	(Denmark) Midtjylland
Galatasaray (Turkey)	3–2	(England) Tottenham Hotspur
IF Elfsborg (Sweden)	1–1	(Portugal) Braga
Nice (France)	2–2	(Netherlands) Twente
Olympiacos (Greece)	1–1	(Scotland) Rangers
Ludogorets Razgrad (Bulgaria)	1–2	(Spain) Athletic Bilbao
Union Saint-Gilloise (Belgium)	1–1	(Italy) Roma
Ajax (Netherlands)	5–0	(Israel) Maccabi Tel Aviv
AZ (Netherlands)	3–1	(Turkey) Fenerbahçe
Dynamo Kyiv (Ukraine)	0–4	(Hungary) Ferencváros
RFS (Latvia)	1–1	(Belgium) Anderlecht
Viktoria Plzeň (Czech Republic)	2–1	(Spain) Real Sociedad
Manchester United (England)	2–0	(Greece) PAOK
Lazio (Italy)	2–1	(Portugal) Porto
TSG Hoffenheim (Germany)	2–2	(France) Lyon

Matchday 5
Home team	Score	Away team
Athletic Bilbao (Spain)	3–0	(Sweden) IF Elfsborg
AZ (Netherlands)	1–1	(Turkey) Galatasaray
Beşiktaş (Turkey)	1–3	(Israel) Maccabi Tel Aviv
Dynamo Kyiv (Ukraine)	1–2	(Czech Republic) Viktoria Plzeň
RFS (Latvia)	0–2	(Greece) PAOK
Qarabağ (Azerbaijan)	1–4	(France) Lyon
Anderlecht (Belgium)	2–2	(Portugal) Porto
Lazio (Italy)	0–0	(Bulgaria) Ludogorets Razgrad
Midtjylland (Denmark)	1–2	(Germany) Eintracht Frankfurt
Twente (Netherlands)	0–1	(Belgium) Union Saint‑Gilloise
Ferencváros (Hungary)	4–1	(Sweden) Malmö FF
FCSB (Romania)	0–0	(Greece) Olympiacos
Manchester United (England)	3–2	(Norway) Bodø/Glimt
Nice (France)	1–4	(Scotland) Rangers
Real Sociedad (Spain)	2–0	(Netherlands) Ajax
Braga (Portugal)	3–0	(Germany) TSG Hoffenheim
Slavia Prague (Czech Republic)	1–2	(Turkey) Fenerbahçe
Tottenham Hotspur (England)	2–2	(Italy) Roma

Matchday 6
Home team	Score	Away team
Fenerbahçe (Turkey)	0–2	(Spain) Athletic Bilbao
Roma (Italy)	3–0	(Portugal) Braga
Viktoria Plzeň (Czech Republic)	1–2	(England) Manchester United
Malmö FF (Sweden)	2–2	(Turkey) Galatasaray
Olympiacos (Greece)	0–0	(Netherlands) Twente
PAOK (Greece)	5–0	(Hungary) Ferencváros
Ludogorets Razgrad (Bulgaria)	2–2	(Netherlands) AZ
Union Saint-Gilloise (Belgium)	2–1	(France) Nice
TSG Hoffenheim (Germany)	0–0	(Romania) FCSB
Ajax (Netherlands)	1–3	(Italy) Lazio
Porto (Portugal)	2–0	(Denmark) Midtjylland
Bodø/Glimt (Norway)	2–1	(Turkey) Beşiktaş
IF Elfsborg (Sweden)	1–0	(Azerbaijan) Qarabağ
Maccabi Tel Aviv (Israel)	2–1	(Latvia) RFS
Lyon (France)	3–2	(Germany) Eintracht Frankfurt
Rangers (Scotland)	1–1	(England) Tottenham Hotspur
Real Sociedad (Spain)	3–0	(Ukraine) Dynamo Kyiv
Slavia Prague (Czech Republic)	1–2	(Belgium) Anderlecht

Matchday 7
Home team	Score	Away team
Galatasaray (Turkey)	3–3	(Ukraine) Dynamo Kyiv
Beşiktaş (Turkey)	4–1	(Spain) Athletic Bilbao
AZ (Netherlands)	1–0	(Italy) Roma
Porto (Portugal)	0–1	(Greece) Olympiacos
Viktoria Plzeň (Czech Republic)	2–0	(Belgium) Anderlecht
Fenerbahçe (Turkey)	0–0	(France) Lyon
Bodø/Glimt (Norway)	3–1	(Israel) Maccabi Tel Aviv
Malmö FF (Sweden)	2–3	(Netherlands) Twente
Qarabağ (Azerbaijan)	2–3	(Romania) FCSB
TSG Hoffenheim (Germany)	2–3	(England) Tottenham Hotspur
Eintracht Frankfurt (Germany)	2–0	(Hungary) Ferencváros
RFS (Latvia)	1–0	(Netherlands) Ajax
IF Elfsborg (Sweden)	1–0	(France) Nice
Manchester United (England)	2–1	(Scotland) Rangers
PAOK (Greece)	2–0	(Czech Republic) Slavia Prague
Ludogorets Razgrad (Bulgaria)	0–2	(Denmark) Midtjylland
Union Saint-Gilloise (Belgium)	2–1	(Portugal) Braga
Lazio (Italy)	3–1	(Spain) Real Sociedad

Matchday 8
Home team	Score	Away team
Ajax (Netherlands)	2–1	(Turkey) Galatasaray
Roma (Italy)	2–0	(Germany) Eintracht Frankfurt
Athletic Bilbao (Spain)	3–1	(Czech Republic) Viktoria Plzeň
Dynamo Kyiv (Ukraine)	1–0	(Latvia) RFS
Midtjylland (Denmark)	2–2	(Turkey) Fenerbahçe
Twente (Netherlands)	1–0	(Turkey) Beşiktaş
Ferencváros (Hungary)	4–3	(Netherlands) AZ
FCSB (Romania)	0–2	(England) Manchester United
Maccabi Tel Aviv (Israel)	0–1	(Portugal) Porto
Nice (France)	1–1	(Norway) Bodø/Glimt
Olympiacos (Greece)	3–0	(Azerbaijan) Qarabağ
Lyon (France)	1–1	(Bulgaria) Ludogorets Razgrad
Rangers (Scotland)	2–1	(Belgium) Union Saint-Gilloise
Real Sociedad (Spain)	2–0	(Greece) PAOK
Anderlecht (Belgium)	3–4	(Germany) TSG Hoffenheim
Braga (Portugal)	1–0	(Italy) Lazio
Slavia Prague (Czech Republic)	2–2	(Sweden) Malmö FF
Tottenham Hotspur (England)	3–0	(Sweden) IF Elfsborg

== Knockout phase ==
In the knockout phase, teams played against each other over two legs on a home-and-away basis, except for the one-match final. The bracket structure for the knockout phase was partially fixed in advance using seeding, with teams' positions in the bracket determined by the final standings in the league phase. In the knockout phase, there was no country protection, with teams from the same association able to face each other in any round. Teams could also face opponents they played during the league phase.

The mechanism of the draws for each round was as follows:

- In the draw for the knockout phase play-offs, the eight teams finishing the league phase in positions 9–16 were seeded, and the eight teams finishing the league phase in positions 17–24 were unseeded. The draw was split into four sections based on the predetermined bracket, with the seeded teams in each section drawn against one of their two possible unseeded opponents. The seeded teams hosted the second leg.
- In the draw for the round of 16, the eight teams finishing the league phase in positions 1–8 were seeded, and the eight winners of the knockout phase play-offs were unseeded. Again, the draw was split into four sections based on the predetermined bracket, with the seeded teams in each section drawn against one of their two possible unseeded opponents. The seeded teams hosted the second leg.
- In the quarter-finals and semi-finals, the exact match pairings were predetermined based on the tournament bracket. A draw was conducted only to determine which team played the first leg at home. The winner of semi-final 1 was designated as the "home" team for the final (for administrative purposes as it was played at a neutral venue).

=== Bracket ===
Knockout phase play-offs
19	(Netherlands) AZ	4	2	6
14	(Turkey) Galatasaray	1	2	3
21	(Belgium) Union Saint-Gilloise	0	2	2
12	(Netherlands) Ajax (a.e.t.)	2	1	3
23	(Netherlands) Twente	2	2	4
9	(Norway) Bodø/Glimt (a.e.t.)	1	5	6
17	(Hungary) Ferencváros	1	0	1
16	(Czech Republic) Viktoria Plzeň	0	3	3
24	(Turkey) Fenerbahçe	3	2	5
10	(Belgium) Anderlecht	0	2	2
18	(Portugal) Porto	1	2	3
15	(Italy) Roma	1	3	4
22	(Greece) PAOK	1	0	1
11	(Romania) FCSB	2	2	4
20	(Denmark) Midtjylland	1	2	3
13	(Spain) Real Sociedad	2	5	7

Round of 16
19	(Netherlands) AZ	1	1	2
4	(England) Tottenham Hotspur	0	3	3
12	(Netherlands) Ajax	1	1	2
5	(Germany) Eintracht Frankfurt	2	4	6
9	(Norway) Bodø/Glimt	3	1	4
7	(Greece) Olympiacos	0	2	2
16	(Czech Republic) Viktoria Plzeň	1	1	2
1	(Italy) Lazio	2	1	3
24	(Turkey) Fenerbahçe	1	2	3 (2)
8	(Scotland) Rangers (p)	3	0	3 (3)
15	(Italy) Roma	2	1	3
2	(Spain) Athletic Bilbao	1	3	4
11	(Romania) FCSB	1	0	1
6	(France) Lyon	3	4	7
13	(Spain) Real Sociedad	1	1	2
3	(England) Manchester United	1	4	5

Quarter-finals
4	(England) Tottenham Hotspur	1	1	2
5	(Germany) Eintracht Frankfurt	1	0	1
9	(Norway) Bodø/Glimt (p)	2	1	3 (3)
1	(Italy) Lazio	0	3	3 (2)
8	(Scotland) Rangers	0	0	0
2	(Spain) Athletic Bilbao	0	2	2
6	(France) Lyon	2	4	6
3	(England) Manchester United (a.e.t.)	2	5	7

Semi-finals
4	(England) Tottenham Hotspur	3	2	5
9	(Norway) Bodø/Glimt	1	0	1
2	(Spain) Athletic Bilbao	0	1	1
3	(England) Manchester United	3	4	7

Final
21 May – Bilbao
4	(England) Tottenham Hotspur	1
3	(England) Manchester United	0

=== Knockout phase play-offs ===
The draw for the knockout phase play-offs was held on 31 January 2025, 13:00 CET. The first legs were played on 13 February, and the second legs were played on 20 February 2025.

Team 1	Agg.	Team 2	1st leg	2nd leg
Ferencváros (Hungary)	1–3	(Czech Republic) Viktoria Plzeň	1–0	0–3
Twente (Netherlands)	4–6	(Norway) Bodø/Glimt	2–1	2–5 (a.e.t.)
Union Saint-Gilloise (Belgium)	2–3	(Netherlands) Ajax	0–2	2–1 (a.e.t.)
AZ (Netherlands)	6–3	(Turkey) Galatasaray	4–1	2–2
Porto (Portugal)	3–4	(Italy) Roma	1–1	2–3
Fenerbahçe (Turkey)	5–2	(Belgium) Anderlecht	3–0	2–2
PAOK (Greece)	1–4	(Romania) FCSB	1–2	0–2
Midtjylland (Denmark)	3–7	(Spain) Real Sociedad	1–2	2–5

=== Round of 16 ===
The draw for the round of 16 was held on 21 February 2025, 13:00 CET. The first legs were played on 6 March, and the second legs were played on 13 March 2025.

Team 1	Agg.	Team 2	1st leg	2nd leg
Viktoria Plzeň (Czech Republic)	2–3	(Italy) Lazio	1–2	1–1
Bodø/Glimt (Norway)	4–2	(Greece) Olympiacos	3–0	1–2
Ajax (Netherlands)	2–6	(Germany) Eintracht Frankfurt	1–2	1–4
AZ (Netherlands)	2–3	(England) Tottenham Hotspur	1–0	1–3
Roma (Italy)	3–4	(Spain) Athletic Bilbao	2–1	1–3
Fenerbahçe (Turkey)	3–3 (2–3 p)	(Scotland) Rangers	1–3	2–0 (a.e.t.)
FCSB (Romania)	1–7	(France) Lyon	1–3	0–4
Real Sociedad (Spain)	2–5	(England) Manchester United	1–1	1–4

=== Quarter-finals ===
The draw for the order of the quarter-final legs was held on 21 February 2025, 13:00 CET, after the round of 16 draw. The first legs were played on 10 April, and the second legs were played on 17 April 2025.

Team 1	Agg.	Team 2	1st leg	2nd leg
Bodø/Glimt (Norway)	3–3 (3–2 p)	(Italy) Lazio	2–0	1–3 (a.e.t.)
Tottenham Hotspur (England)	2–1	(Germany) Eintracht Frankfurt	1–1	1–0
Rangers (Scotland)	0–2	(Spain) Athletic Bilbao	0–0	0–2
Lyon (France)	6–7	(England) Manchester United	2–2	4–5 (a.e.t.)

=== Semi-finals ===
The draw for the order of the semi-final legs was held on 21 February 2025, 13:00 CET, after the round of 16 and quarter-final draws. The first legs were played on 1 May, and the second legs were played on 8 May 2025.

Team 1	Agg.	Team 2	1st leg	2nd leg
Tottenham Hotspur (England)	5–1	(Norway) Bodø/Glimt	3–1	2–0
Athletic Bilbao (Spain)	1–7	(England) Manchester United	0–3	1–4

=== Final ===
The final was played on 21 May 2025 at the San Mamés Stadium in Bilbao. The winner of semi-final 1 was designated as the "home" team for administrative purposes.

21 May 2025
21:00 UTC+2

Tottenham Hotspur (The Football Association)	1–0	(The Football Association) Manchester United
Johnson 42'	Report

San Mamés, Bilbao
Attendance: 49,224
Referee: Felix Zwayer (Germany)

== Statistics ==
Statistics exclude qualifying rounds and play-off round.

=== Top goalscorers ===
Rank	Player	Team	Goals	Minutes played
1	(Morocco) Ayoub El Kaabi	(Greece) Olympiacos	7	701
1	(Denmark) Kasper Høgh	(Norway) Bodø/Glimt	7	1032
1	(Portugal) Bruno Fernandes	(England) Manchester United	7	1281
4	(Belgium) Malick Fofana	(France) Lyon	6	514
4	(Nigeria) Victor Osimhen	(Turkey) Galatasaray	6	594
4	(Hungary) Barnabás Varga	(Hungary) Ferencváros	6	686
4	(Spain) Samu Aghehowa	(Portugal) Porto	6	767
4	(Morocco) Youssef En-Nesyri	(Turkey) Fenerbahçe	6	865
4	(Czech Republic) Václav Černý	(Scotland) Rangers	6	932
4	(Denmark) Rasmus Højlund	(England) Manchester United	6	997

=== Team of the Season ===
The UEFA technical study group selected the following players as the team of the tournament.

Pos.	Player	Team
GK	(Italy) Guglielmo Vicario	(England) Tottenham Hotspur
DF	(Spain) Pedro Porro	(England) Tottenham Hotspur
DF	(Argentina) Cristian Romero	(England) Tottenham Hotspur
DF	(Germany) Robin Koch	(Germany) Eintracht Frankfurt
DF	(Norway) Fredrik André Bjørkan	(Norway) Bodø/Glimt
MF	(Norway) Patrick Berg	(Norway) Bodø/Glimt
MF	(Portugal) Bruno Fernandes	(England) Manchester United
MF	(Brazil) Casemiro	(England) Manchester United
FW	(France) Rayan Cherki	(France) Lyon
FW	(England) Dominic Solanke	(England) Tottenham Hotspur
FW	(Spain) Nico Williams	(Spain) Athletic Bilbao

=== Player of the Season ===
- (Argentina) Cristian Romero ( (England) Tottenham Hotspur)

=== Young Player of the Season ===
- (France) Rayan Cherki ( (France) Lyon)

== See also ==
- 2024–25 UEFA Champions League
- 2024–25 UEFA Conference League
- 2025 UEFA Super Cup
- 2024–25 UEFA Women's Champions League
- 2024–25 UEFA Youth League
