= 2024–25 UEFA Europa League league phase =

International football club competition in Europe

The 2024–25 UEFA Europa League league phase began on 25 September 2024 and ended on 30 January 2025. A total of 36 teams competed in the league phase to decide the 24 places in the knockout phase of the 2024–25 UEFA Europa League.

RFS made their debut appearance in the Europa League since the introduction of the group stage. A total of 23 national associations were represented in the league phase.

This was the first season with the single-league format, which replaced the group format used until the previous season. With the format change, the number of matches prior to the knockout phase increased from 96 to 144. Porto's Samu Aghehowa was the first-ever goalscorer of the competition's league phase.

== Format ==
Each team played eight matches, four at home and four away, against eight different opponents, with all 36 teams ranked in a single league table. Teams were separated into four pots based on their 2024 UEFA club coefficients, and each team played two teams from each of the four pots – one at home and one away. The top eight ranked teams received a bye to the round of 16. The teams ranked from 9th to 24th contested the knockout phase play-offs, with the teams ranked from 9th to 16th seeded for the draw. Teams ranked from 25th to 36th were eliminated from all competitions, with no access to the 2024–25 UEFA Conference League.

=== Tiebreakers ===
Teams were ranked according to points (3 points for a win, 1 point for a draw, 0 points for a loss). If two or more teams were equal on points upon completion of the league phase, the following tiebreaking criteria were applied, in the order given, to determine their rankings:

1. Goal difference;
2. Goals scored;
3. Away goals scored;
4. Wins;
5. Away wins;
6. Higher number of points obtained collectively by league phase opponents;
7. Superior collective goal difference of league phase opponents;
8. Higher number of goals scored collectively by league phase opponents;
9. Lower disciplinary points total (direct red card = 3 points, yellow card = 1 point, expulsion for two yellow cards in one match = 3 points);
10. UEFA club coefficient.

During the league phase, criteria 1 to 5 were used to rank teams who had equal number of points. Should any teams have been equal on points and tied on the first five criteria, they were considered equal in position and sorted alphabetically. Criteria 6 to 10 was only used to break ties upon completion of all matches.

== Teams and seeding ==
The 36 teams were divided into four pots of nine teams each, with teams allocated to pots based on their 2024 UEFA club coefficients. The participants included:

- 13 teams which entered at this stage
- 12 winners of the play-off round
- 7 losers of the Champions League play-off round (5 from the Champions Path, 2 from the League Path)
- 4 losers of the Champions League third qualifying round (League Path)

Key to colours
Teams ranked 1 to 8 advanced to the round of 16 as a seeded team
Teams ranked 9 to 16 advanced to the knockout phase play-offs as a seeded team
Teams ranked 17 to 24 advanced to the knockout phase play-offs as an unseeded team

Pot 1
Team	Notes	Coeff.
(Italian Football Federation) Roma		101.000
(The Football Association) Manchester United		92.000
(Portuguese Football Federation) Porto		77.000
(Royal Dutch Football Association) Ajax		67.000
(Scottish Football Association) Rangers		63.000
(German Football Association) Eintracht Frankfurt		60.000
(Italian Football Federation) Lazio		54.000
(The Football Association) Tottenham Hotspur		54.000
(Football Association of the Czech Republic) Slavia Prague		53.000

Pot 2
Team	Notes	Coeff.
(Royal Spanish Football Federation) Real Sociedad		51.000
(Royal Dutch Football Association) AZ		50.000
(Portuguese Football Federation) Braga		49.000
(Hellenic Football Federation) Olympiacos		48.000
(French Football Federation) Lyon		44.000
(Hellenic Football Federation) PAOK		37.000
(Turkish Football Federation) Fenerbahçe		36.000
(Israel Football Association) Maccabi Tel Aviv		35.500
(Hungarian Football Federation) Ferencváros		35.000

Pot 3
Team	Notes	Coeff.
(Association of Football Federations of Azerbaijan) Qarabağ		33.000
(Turkish Football Federation) Galatasaray		31.500
(Football Association of the Czech Republic) Viktoria Plzeň		28.000
(Norwegian Football Federation) Bodø/Glimt		28.000
(Royal Belgian Football Association) Union Saint-Gilloise		27.000
(Ukrainian Association of Football) Dynamo Kyiv		26.500
(Bulgarian Football Union) Ludogorets Razgrad		26.000
(Danish Football Association) Midtjylland		25.500
(Swedish Football Association) Malmö FF		18.500

Pot 4
Team	Notes	Coeff.
(Royal Spanish Football Federation) Athletic Bilbao		17.897
(German Football Association) TSG Hoffenheim		17.324
(French Football Federation) Nice		17.000
(Royal Belgian Football Association) Anderlecht		14.500
(Royal Dutch Football Association) Twente		12.260
(Turkish Football Federation) Beşiktaş		12.000
(Romanian Football Federation) FCSB		10.500
(Latvian Football Federation) RFS		8.000
(Swedish Football Association) IF Elfsborg		4.300

Notes

1. ^{ECL} Europa Conference League title holders (now known as the Conference League)
2. ^{EL-PO} Winners of play-off round
3. ^{CL-CP} Losers of Champions League play-off round (Champions Path)
4. ^{CL-LP} Losers of Champions League play-off round (League Path)
5. ^{CL-L3} Losers of Champions League third qualifying round (League Path)

== Draw ==
The draw for the league phase pairings was held at the Grimaldi Forum in Monaco on 30 August 2024, 13:00 CEST. All 36 teams were manually drawn using physical balls. For every team manually drawn, a guest on stage pressed the button for the automated software to digitally draw their opponents at random, determining which of their matches were at home and which ones away. Each team faced two opponents from each of the four pots, one of which they faced at home and one away. Teams could not face opponents from their own association, and could only be drawn against a maximum of two sides from the same association. The draw started with Pot 1, assigning opponents to all teams, one after the other, and continued with the other pots in ascending order until all teams were assigned their opponents.

The switch to a primarily computer-based draw was made due to issues with the complexity and duration required by a manual draw. The draw software, developed by AE Live, guaranteed total randomness within the framework of the draw conditions and prevented any deadlock situations. The software was reviewed by external auditor Ernst & Young, which also provided review and control of the manual and digital draw operations on-site.

League phase opponents by club
Club	Pot 1 opponents		Pot 2 opponents		Pot 3 opponents		Pot 4 opponents		Avg coeff.
Club	Home	Away	Home	Away	Home	Away	Home	Away	Avg coeff.
(Italian Football Federation) Roma	Eintracht Frankfurt	Tottenham Hotspur	Braga	AZ	Dynamo Kyiv	Union Saint-Gilloise	Athletic Bilbao	IF Elfsborg	36.1
(The Football Association) Manchester United	Rangers	Porto	PAOK	Fenerbahçe	Bodø/Glimt	Viktoria Plzeň	Twente	FCSB	36.5
(Portuguese Football Federation) Porto	Manchester United	Lazio	Olympiacos	Maccabi Tel Aviv	Midtjylland	Bodø/Glimt	TSG Hoffenheim	Anderlecht	39.4
(Royal Dutch Football Association) Ajax	Lazio	Slavia Prague	Maccabi Tel Aviv	Real Sociedad	Galatasaray	Qarabağ	Beşiktaş	RFS	34.8
(Scottish Football Association) Rangers	Tottenham Hotspur	Manchester United	Lyon	Olympiacos	Union Saint-Gilloise	Malmö FF	FCSB	Nice	38.9
(German Football Association) Eintracht Frankfurt	Slavia Prague	Roma	Ferencváros	Lyon	Viktoria Plzeň	Midtjylland	RFS	Beşiktaş	38.3
(Italian Football Federation) Lazio	Porto	Ajax	Real Sociedad	Braga	Ludogorets Razgrad	Dynamo Kyiv	Nice	Twente	40.7
(The Football Association) Tottenham Hotspur	Roma	Rangers	AZ	Ferencváros	Qarabağ	Galatasaray	IF Elfsborg	TSG Hoffenheim	41.9
(Football Association of the Czech Republic) Slavia Prague	Ajax	Eintracht Frankfurt	Fenerbahçe	PAOK	Malmö FF	Ludogorets Razgrad	Anderlecht	Athletic Bilbao	34.6
(Royal Spanish Football Federation) Real Sociedad	Ajax	Lazio	PAOK	Maccabi Tel Aviv	Dynamo Kyiv	Viktoria Plzeň	Anderlecht	Nice	34.9
(Royal Dutch Football Association) AZ	Roma	Tottenham Hotspur	Fenerbahçe	Ferencváros	Galatasaray	Ludogorets Razgrad	IF Elfsborg	Athletic Bilbao	38.2
(Portuguese Football Federation) Braga	Lazio	Roma	Maccabi Tel Aviv	Olympiacos	Bodø/Glimt	Union Saint-Gilloise	TSG Hoffenheim	IF Elfsborg	39.4
(Hellenic Football Federation) Olympiacos	Rangers	Porto	Braga	Lyon	Qarabağ	Malmö FF	Twente	FCSB	38.4
(French Football Federation) Lyon	Eintracht Frankfurt	Rangers	Olympiacos	Fenerbahçe	Ludogorets Razgrad	Qarabağ	Beşiktaş	TSG Hoffenheim	36.9
(Hellenic Football Federation) PAOK	Slavia Prague	Manchester United	Ferencváros	Real Sociedad	Viktoria Plzeň	Galatasaray	FCSB	RFS	38.6
(Turkish Football Federation) Fenerbahçe	Manchester United	Slavia Prague	Lyon	AZ	Union Saint-Gilloise	Midtjylland	Athletic Bilbao	Twente	40.2
(Israel Football Association) Maccabi Tel Aviv	Porto	Ajax	Real Sociedad	Braga	Midtjylland	Bodø/Glimt	RFS	Beşiktaş	39.7
(Hungarian Football Federation) Ferencváros	Tottenham Hotspur	Eintracht Frankfurt	AZ	PAOK	Malmö FF	Dynamo Kyiv	Nice	Anderlecht	34.7
(Association of Football Federations of Azerbaijan) Qarabağ	Ajax	Tottenham Hotspur	Lyon	Olympiacos	Malmö FF	Bodø/Glimt	FCSB	IF Elfsborg	34.3
(Turkish Football Federation) Galatasaray	Tottenham Hotspur	Ajax	PAOK	AZ	Dynamo Kyiv	Malmö FF	IF Elfsborg	RFS	33.2
(Football Association of the Czech Republic) Viktoria Plzeň	Manchester United	Eintracht Frankfurt	Real Sociedad	PAOK	Ludogorets Razgrad	Dynamo Kyiv	Anderlecht	Athletic Bilbao	40.6
(Norwegian Football Federation) Bodø/Glimt	Porto	Manchester United	Maccabi Tel Aviv	Braga	Qarabağ	Union Saint-Gilloise	Beşiktaş	Nice	42.8
(Royal Belgian Football Association) Union Saint-Gilloise	Roma	Rangers	Braga	Fenerbahçe	Bodø/Glimt	Midtjylland	Nice	Twente	41.5
(Ukrainian Association of Football) Dynamo Kyiv	Lazio	Roma	Ferencváros	Real Sociedad	Viktoria Plzeň	Galatasaray	RFS	TSG Hoffenheim	40.7
(Bulgarian Football Union) Ludogorets Razgrad	Slavia Prague	Lazio	AZ	Lyon	Midtjylland	Viktoria Plzeň	Athletic Bilbao	Anderlecht	35.9
(Danish Football Association) Midtjylland	Eintracht Frankfurt	Porto	Fenerbahçe	Maccabi Tel Aviv	Union Saint-Gilloise	Ludogorets Razgrad	TSG Hoffenheim	FCSB	36.2
(Swedish Football Association) Malmö FF	Rangers	Slavia Prague	Olympiacos	Ferencváros	Galatasaray	Qarabağ	Twente	Beşiktaş	36.0
(Royal Spanish Football Federation) Athletic Bilbao	Slavia Prague	Roma	AZ	Fenerbahçe	Viktoria Plzeň	Ludogorets Razgrad	IF Elfsborg	Beşiktaş	38.8
(German Football Association) TSG Hoffenheim	Tottenham Hotspur	Porto	Lyon	Braga	Dynamo Kyiv	Midtjylland	FCSB	Anderlecht	37.6
(French Football Federation) Nice	Rangers	Lazio	Real Sociedad	Ferencváros	Bodø/Glimt	Union Saint-Gilloise	Twente	IF Elfsborg	34.3
(Royal Belgian Football Association) Anderlecht	Porto	Slavia Prague	Ferencváros	Real Sociedad	Ludogorets Razgrad	Viktoria Plzeň	TSG Hoffenheim	RFS	36.9
(Royal Dutch Football Association) Twente	Lazio	Manchester United	Fenerbahçe	Olympiacos	Union Saint-Gilloise	Malmö FF	Beşiktaş	Nice	38.1
(Turkish Football Federation) Beşiktaş	Eintracht Frankfurt	Ajax	Maccabi Tel Aviv	Lyon	Malmö FF	Bodø/Glimt	Athletic Bilbao	Twente	35.4
(Romanian Football Federation) FCSB	Manchester United	Rangers	Olympiacos	PAOK	Midtjylland	Qarabağ	RFS	TSG Hoffenheim	40.5
(Latvian Football Federation) RFS	Ajax	Eintracht Frankfurt	PAOK	Maccabi Tel Aviv	Galatasaray	Dynamo Kyiv	Anderlecht	FCSB	35.3
(Swedish Football Association) IF Elfsborg	Roma	Tottenham Hotspur	Braga	AZ	Qarabağ	Galatasaray	Nice	Athletic Bilbao	44.2

== League phase table ==
The top eight ranked teams receive a bye directly to the round of 16. Teams ranked from 9th to 24th contest the knockout phase play-offs, with teams ranked from 9th to 16th seeded for the draw, while those ranked from 17th to 24th are not. Teams ranked from 25th to 36th are eliminated from all competitions.

Pos	Team	Pld	W	D	L	GF	GA	GD	Pts	Qualification
1	(Italian Football Federation) Lazio	8	6	1	1	17	5	+12	19	Advance to round of 16 (seeded)
2	(Royal Spanish Football Federation) Athletic Bilbao	8	6	1	1	15	7	+8	19	Advance to round of 16 (seeded)
3	(The Football Association) Manchester United	8	5	3	0	16	9	+7	18	Advance to round of 16 (seeded)
4	(The Football Association) Tottenham Hotspur	8	5	2	1	17	9	+8	17	Advance to round of 16 (seeded)
5	(German Football Association) Eintracht Frankfurt	8	5	1	2	14	10	+4	16	Advance to round of 16 (seeded)
6	(French Football Federation) Lyon	8	4	3	1	16	8	+8	15	Advance to round of 16 (seeded)
7	(Hellenic Football Federation) Olympiacos	8	4	3	1	9	3	+6	15	Advance to round of 16 (seeded)
8	(Scottish Football Association) Rangers	8	4	2	2	16	10	+6	14	Advance to round of 16 (seeded)
9	(Norwegian Football Federation) Bodø/Glimt	8	4	2	2	14	11	+3	14	Advance to knockout phase play-offs (seeded)
10	(Royal Belgian Football Association) Anderlecht	8	4	2	2	14	12	+2	14	Advance to knockout phase play-offs (seeded)
11	(Romanian Football Federation) FCSB	8	4	2	2	10	9	+1	14	Advance to knockout phase play-offs (seeded)
12	(Royal Dutch Football Association) Ajax	8	4	1	3	16	8	+8	13	Advance to knockout phase play-offs (seeded)
13	(Royal Spanish Football Federation) Real Sociedad	8	4	1	3	13	9	+4	13	Advance to knockout phase play-offs (seeded)
14	(Turkish Football Federation) Galatasaray	8	3	4	1	19	16	+3	13	Advance to knockout phase play-offs (seeded)
15	(Italian Football Federation) Roma	8	3	3	2	10	6	+4	12	Advance to knockout phase play-offs (seeded)
16	(Football Association of the Czech Republic) Viktoria Plzeň	8	3	3	2	13	12	+1	12	Advance to knockout phase play-offs (seeded)
17	(Hungarian Football Federation) Ferencváros	8	4	0	4	15	15	0	12	Advance to knockout phase play-offs (unseeded)
18	(Portuguese Football Federation) Porto	8	3	2	3	13	11	+2	11	Advance to knockout phase play-offs (unseeded)
19	(Royal Dutch Football Association) AZ	8	3	2	3	13	13	0	11	Advance to knockout phase play-offs (unseeded)
20	(Danish Football Association) Midtjylland	8	3	2	3	9	9	0	11	Advance to knockout phase play-offs (unseeded)
21	(Royal Belgian Football Association) Union Saint-Gilloise	8	3	2	3	8	8	0	11	Advance to knockout phase play-offs (unseeded)
22	(Hellenic Football Federation) PAOK	8	3	1	4	12	10	+2	10	Advance to knockout phase play-offs (unseeded)
23	(Royal Dutch Football Association) Twente	8	2	4	2	8	9	−1	10	Advance to knockout phase play-offs (unseeded)
24	(Turkish Football Federation) Fenerbahçe	8	2	4	2	9	11	−2	10	Advance to knockout phase play-offs (unseeded)
25	(Portuguese Football Federation) Braga	8	3	1	4	9	12	−3	10	
26	(Swedish Football Association) IF Elfsborg	8	3	1	4	9	14	−5	10	
27	(German Football Association) TSG Hoffenheim	8	2	3	3	11	14	−3	9	
28	(Turkish Football Federation) Beşiktaş	8	3	0	5	10	15	−5	9	
29	(Israel Football Association) Maccabi Tel Aviv	8	2	0	6	8	17	−9	6	
30	(Football Association of the Czech Republic) Slavia Prague	8	1	2	5	7	11	−4	5	
31	(Swedish Football Association) Malmö FF	8	1	2	5	10	17	−7	5	
32	(Latvian Football Federation) RFS	8	1	2	5	6	13	−7	5	
33	(Bulgarian Football Union) Ludogorets Razgrad	8	0	4	4	4	11	−7	4	
34	(Ukrainian Association of Football) Dynamo Kyiv	8	1	1	6	5	18	−13	4	
35	(French Football Federation) Nice	8	0	3	5	7	16	−9	3	
36	(Association of Football Federations of Azerbaijan) Qarabağ	8	1	0	7	6	20	−14	3	

Source: UEFA
Rules for classification: League phase tiebreakers

== Results summary ==
=== By matchday ===
Matchday 1
Home team	Score	Away team
AZ (Netherlands)	3–2	(Sweden) IF Elfsborg
Bodø/Glimt (Norway)	3–2	(Portugal) Porto
Dynamo Kyiv (Ukraine)	0–3	(Italy) Lazio
Midtjylland (Denmark)	1–1	(Germany) TSG Hoffenheim
Galatasaray (Turkey)	3–1	(Greece) PAOK
Manchester United (England)	1–1	(Netherlands) Twente
Nice (France)	1–1	(Spain) Real Sociedad
Ludogorets Razgrad (Bulgaria)	0–2	(Czech Republic) Slavia Prague
Anderlecht (Belgium)	2–1	(Hungary) Ferencváros
Fenerbahçe (Turkey)	2–1	(Belgium) Union Saint-Gilloise
Malmö FF (Sweden)	0–2	(Scotland) Rangers
Ajax (Netherlands)	4–0	(Turkey) Beşiktaş
Roma (Italy)	1–1	(Spain) Athletic Bilbao
Eintracht Frankfurt (Germany)	3–3	(Czech Republic) Viktoria Plzeň
FCSB (Romania)	4–1	(Latvia) RFS
Lyon (France)	2–0	(Greece) Olympiacos
Braga (Portugal)	2–1	(Israel) Maccabi Tel Aviv
Tottenham Hotspur (England)	3–0	(Azerbaijan) Qarabağ

Matchday 2
Home team	Score	Away team
RFS (Latvia)	2–2	(Turkey) Galatasaray
Ferencváros (Hungary)	1–2	(England) Tottenham Hotspur
Maccabi Tel Aviv (Israel)	0–2	(Denmark) Midtjylland
Olympiacos (Greece)	3–0	(Portugal) Braga
Qarabağ (Azerbaijan)	1–2	(Sweden) Malmö FF
Real Sociedad (Spain)	1–2	(Belgium) Anderlecht
Lazio (Italy)	4–1	(France) Nice
Slavia Prague (Czech Republic)	1–1	(Netherlands) Ajax
TSG Hoffenheim (Germany)	2–0	(Ukraine) Dynamo Kyiv
Athletic Bilbao (Spain)	2–0	(Netherlands) AZ
Beşiktaş (Turkey)	1–3	(Germany) Eintracht Frankfurt
Porto (Portugal)	3–3	(England) Manchester United
Twente (Netherlands)	1–1	(Turkey) Fenerbahçe
Viktoria Plzeň (Czech Republic)	0–0	(Bulgaria) Ludogorets Razgrad
IF Elfsborg (Sweden)	1–0	(Italy) Roma
PAOK (Greece)	0–1	(Romania) FCSB
Union Saint-Gilloise (Belgium)	0–0	(Norway) Bodø/Glimt
Rangers (Scotland)	1–4	(France) Lyon

Matchday 3
Home team	Score	Away team
Galatasaray (Turkey)	4–3	(Sweden) IF Elfsborg
Braga (Portugal)	1–2	(Norway) Bodø/Glimt
Roma (Italy)	1–0	(Ukraine) Dynamo Kyiv
Eintracht Frankfurt (Germany)	1–0	(Latvia) RFS
Midtjylland (Denmark)	1–0	(Belgium) Union Saint-Gilloise
Ferencváros (Hungary)	1–0	(France) Nice
Maccabi Tel Aviv (Israel)	1–2	(Spain) Real Sociedad
PAOK (Greece)	2–2	(Czech Republic) Viktoria Plzeň
Qarabağ (Azerbaijan)	0–3	(Netherlands) Ajax
Athletic Bilbao (Spain)	1–0	(Czech Republic) Slavia Prague
Porto (Portugal)	2–0	(Germany) TSG Hoffenheim
Twente (Netherlands)	0–2	(Italy) Lazio
Fenerbahçe (Turkey)	1–1	(England) Manchester United
Malmö FF (Sweden)	0–1	(Greece) Olympiacos
Lyon (France)	0–1	(Turkey) Beşiktaş
Rangers (Scotland)	4–0	(Romania) FCSB
Anderlecht (Belgium)	2–0	(Bulgaria) Ludogorets Razgrad
Tottenham Hotspur (England)	1–0	(Netherlands) AZ

Matchday 4
Home team	Score	Away team
Beşiktaş (Turkey)	2–1	(Sweden) Malmö FF
Eintracht Frankfurt (Germany)	1–0	(Czech Republic) Slavia Prague
Bodø/Glimt (Norway)	1–2	(Azerbaijan) Qarabağ
FCSB (Romania)	2–0	(Denmark) Midtjylland
Galatasaray (Turkey)	3–2	(England) Tottenham Hotspur
IF Elfsborg (Sweden)	1–1	(Portugal) Braga
Nice (France)	2–2	(Netherlands) Twente
Olympiacos (Greece)	1–1	(Scotland) Rangers
Ludogorets Razgrad (Bulgaria)	1–2	(Spain) Athletic Bilbao
Union Saint-Gilloise (Belgium)	1–1	(Italy) Roma
Ajax (Netherlands)	5–0	(Israel) Maccabi Tel Aviv
AZ (Netherlands)	3–1	(Turkey) Fenerbahçe
Dynamo Kyiv (Ukraine)	0–4	(Hungary) Ferencváros
RFS (Latvia)	1–1	(Belgium) Anderlecht
Viktoria Plzeň (Czech Republic)	2–1	(Spain) Real Sociedad
Manchester United (England)	2–0	(Greece) PAOK
Lazio (Italy)	2–1	(Portugal) Porto
TSG Hoffenheim (Germany)	2–2	(France) Lyon

Matchday 5
Home team	Score	Away team
Athletic Bilbao (Spain)	3–0	(Sweden) IF Elfsborg
AZ (Netherlands)	1–1	(Turkey) Galatasaray
Beşiktaş (Turkey)	1–3	(Israel) Maccabi Tel Aviv
Dynamo Kyiv (Ukraine)	1–2	(Czech Republic) Viktoria Plzeň
RFS (Latvia)	0–2	(Greece) PAOK
Qarabağ (Azerbaijan)	1–4	(France) Lyon
Anderlecht (Belgium)	2–2	(Portugal) Porto
Lazio (Italy)	0–0	(Bulgaria) Ludogorets Razgrad
Midtjylland (Denmark)	1–2	(Germany) Eintracht Frankfurt
Twente (Netherlands)	0–1	(Belgium) Union Saint‑Gilloise
Ferencváros (Hungary)	4–1	(Sweden) Malmö FF
FCSB (Romania)	0–0	(Greece) Olympiacos
Manchester United (England)	3–2	(Norway) Bodø/Glimt
Nice (France)	1–4	(Scotland) Rangers
Real Sociedad (Spain)	2–0	(Netherlands) Ajax
Braga (Portugal)	3–0	(Germany) TSG Hoffenheim
Slavia Prague (Czech Republic)	1–2	(Turkey) Fenerbahçe
Tottenham Hotspur (England)	2–2	(Italy) Roma

Matchday 6
Home team	Score	Away team
Fenerbahçe (Turkey)	0–2	(Spain) Athletic Bilbao
Roma (Italy)	3–0	(Portugal) Braga
Viktoria Plzeň (Czech Republic)	1–2	(England) Manchester United
Malmö FF (Sweden)	2–2	(Turkey) Galatasaray
Olympiacos (Greece)	0–0	(Netherlands) Twente
PAOK (Greece)	5–0	(Hungary) Ferencváros
Ludogorets Razgrad (Bulgaria)	2–2	(Netherlands) AZ
Union Saint-Gilloise (Belgium)	2–1	(France) Nice
TSG Hoffenheim (Germany)	0–0	(Romania) FCSB
Ajax (Netherlands)	1–3	(Italy) Lazio
Porto (Portugal)	2–0	(Denmark) Midtjylland
Bodø/Glimt (Norway)	2–1	(Turkey) Beşiktaş
IF Elfsborg (Sweden)	1–0	(Azerbaijan) Qarabağ
Maccabi Tel Aviv (Israel)	2–1	(Latvia) RFS
Lyon (France)	3–2	(Germany) Eintracht Frankfurt
Rangers (Scotland)	1–1	(England) Tottenham Hotspur
Real Sociedad (Spain)	3–0	(Ukraine) Dynamo Kyiv
Slavia Prague (Czech Republic)	1–2	(Belgium) Anderlecht

Matchday 7
Home team	Score	Away team
Galatasaray (Turkey)	3–3	(Ukraine) Dynamo Kyiv
Beşiktaş (Turkey)	4–1	(Spain) Athletic Bilbao
AZ (Netherlands)	1–0	(Italy) Roma
Porto (Portugal)	0–1	(Greece) Olympiacos
Viktoria Plzeň (Czech Republic)	2–0	(Belgium) Anderlecht
Fenerbahçe (Turkey)	0–0	(France) Lyon
Bodø/Glimt (Norway)	3–1	(Israel) Maccabi Tel Aviv
Malmö FF (Sweden)	2–3	(Netherlands) Twente
Qarabağ (Azerbaijan)	2–3	(Romania) FCSB
TSG Hoffenheim (Germany)	2–3	(England) Tottenham Hotspur
Eintracht Frankfurt (Germany)	2–0	(Hungary) Ferencváros
RFS (Latvia)	1–0	(Netherlands) Ajax
IF Elfsborg (Sweden)	1–0	(France) Nice
Manchester United (England)	2–1	(Scotland) Rangers
PAOK (Greece)	2–0	(Czech Republic) Slavia Prague
Ludogorets Razgrad (Bulgaria)	0–2	(Denmark) Midtjylland
Union Saint-Gilloise (Belgium)	2–1	(Portugal) Braga
Lazio (Italy)	3–1	(Spain) Real Sociedad

Matchday 8
Home team	Score	Away team
Ajax (Netherlands)	2–1	(Turkey) Galatasaray
Roma (Italy)	2–0	(Germany) Eintracht Frankfurt
Athletic Bilbao (Spain)	3–1	(Czech Republic) Viktoria Plzeň
Dynamo Kyiv (Ukraine)	1–0	(Latvia) RFS
Midtjylland (Denmark)	2–2	(Turkey) Fenerbahçe
Twente (Netherlands)	1–0	(Turkey) Beşiktaş
Ferencváros (Hungary)	4–3	(Netherlands) AZ
FCSB (Romania)	0–2	(England) Manchester United
Maccabi Tel Aviv (Israel)	0–1	(Portugal) Porto
Nice (France)	1–1	(Norway) Bodø/Glimt
Olympiacos (Greece)	3–0	(Azerbaijan) Qarabağ
Lyon (France)	1–1	(Bulgaria) Ludogorets Razgrad
Rangers (Scotland)	2–1	(Belgium) Union Saint-Gilloise
Real Sociedad (Spain)	2–0	(Greece) PAOK
Anderlecht (Belgium)	3–4	(Germany) TSG Hoffenheim
Braga (Portugal)	1–0	(Italy) Lazio
Slavia Prague (Czech Republic)	2–2	(Sweden) Malmö FF
Tottenham Hotspur (England)	3–0	(Sweden) IF Elfsborg

=== By team ===
Results by Pot 1 team
Team	Matchday							
Team	1	2	3	4	5	6	7	8
(Italy) Roma	ATH (H)	ELF (A)	DKV (H)	USG (A)	TOT (A)	BRA (H)	AZ (A)	FRA (H)
(Italy) Roma	1–1	0–1	1–0	1–1	2–2	3–0	0–1	2–0
(England) Manchester United	TWE (H)	POR (A)	FEN (A)	PAOK (H)	BOD (H)	PLZ (A)	RAN (H)	FCSB (A)
(England) Manchester United	1–1	3–3	1–1	2–0	3–2	2–1	2–1	2–0
(Portugal) Porto	BOD (A)	MUN (H)	HOF (H)	LAZ (A)	AND (A)	MID (H)	OLY (H)	MTA (A)
(Portugal) Porto	2–3	3–3	2–0	1–2	2–2	2–0	0–1	1–0
(Netherlands) Ajax	BES (H)	SLP (A)	QRB (A)	MTA (H)	RSO (A)	LAZ (H)	RFS (A)	GAL (H)
(Netherlands) Ajax	4–0	1–1	3–0	5–0	0–2	1–3	0–1	2–1
(Scotland) Rangers	MAL (A)	LYO (H)	FCSB (H)	OLY (A)	NIC (A)	TOT (H)	MUN (A)	USG (H)
(Scotland) Rangers	2–0	1–4	4–0	1–1	4–1	1–1	1–2	2–1
(Germany) Eintracht Frankfurt	PLZ (H)	BES (A)	RFS (H)	SLP (H)	MID (A)	LYO (A)	FER (H)	ROM (A)
(Germany) Eintracht Frankfurt	3–3	3–1	1–0	1–0	2–1	2–3	2–0	0–2
(Italy) Lazio	DKV (A)	NIC (H)	TWE (A)	POR (H)	LUD (H)	AJX (A)	RSO (H)	BRA (A)
(Italy) Lazio	3–0	4–1	2–0	2–1	0–0	3–1	3–1	0–1
(England) Tottenham Hotspur	QRB (H)	FER (A)	AZ (H)	GAL (A)	ROM (H)	RAN (A)	HOF (A)	ELF (H)
(England) Tottenham Hotspur	3–0	2–1	1–0	2–3	2–2	1–1	3–2	3–0
(Czech Republic) Slavia Prague	LUD (A)	AJX (H)	ATH (A)	FRA (A)	FEN (H)	AND (H)	PAOK (A)	MAL (H)
(Czech Republic) Slavia Prague	2–0	1–1	0–1	0–1	1–2	1–2	0–2	2–2

Results by Pot 2 team
Team	Matchday							
Team	1	2	3	4	5	6	7	8
(Spain) Real Sociedad	NIC (A)	AND (H)	MTA (A)	PLZ (A)	AJX (H)	DKV (H)	LAZ (A)	PAOK (H)
(Spain) Real Sociedad	1–1	1–2	2–1	1–2	2–0	3–0	1–3	2–0
(Netherlands) AZ	ELF (H)	ATH (A)	TOT (A)	FEN (H)	GAL (H)	LUD (A)	ROM (H)	FER (A)
(Netherlands) AZ	3–2	0–2	0–1	3–1	1–1	2–2	1–0	3–4
(Portugal) Braga	MTA (H)	OLY (A)	BOD (H)	ELF (A)	HOF (H)	ROM (A)	USG (A)	LAZ (H)
(Portugal) Braga	2–1	0–3	1–2	1–1	3–0	0–3	1–2	1–0
(Greece) Olympiacos	LYO (A)	BRA (H)	MAL (A)	RAN (H)	FCSB (A)	TWE (H)	POR (A)	QRB (H)
(Greece) Olympiacos	0–2	3–0	1–0	1–1	0–0	0–0	1–0	3–0
(France) Lyon	OLY (H)	RAN (A)	BES (H)	HOF (A)	QRB (A)	FRA (H)	FEN (A)	LUD (H)
(France) Lyon	2–0	4–1	0–1	2–2	4–1	3–2	0–0	1–1
(Greece) PAOK	GAL (A)	FCSB (H)	PLZ (H)	MUN (A)	RFS (A)	FER (H)	SLP (H)	RSO (A)
(Greece) PAOK	1–3	0–1	2–2	0–2	2–0	5–0	2–0	0–2
(Turkey) Fenerbahçe	USG (H)	TWE (A)	MUN (H)	AZ (A)	SLP (A)	ATH (H)	LYO (H)	MID (A)
(Turkey) Fenerbahçe	2–1	1–1	1–1	1–3	2–1	0–2	0–0	2–2
(Israel) Maccabi Tel Aviv	BRA (A)	MID (H)	RSO (H)	AJX (A)	BES (A)	RFS (H)	BOD (A)	POR (H)
(Israel) Maccabi Tel Aviv	1–2	0–2	1–2	0–5	3–1	2–1	1–3	0–1
(Hungary) Ferencváros	AND (A)	TOT (H)	NIC (H)	DKV (A)	MAL (H)	PAOK (A)	FRA (A)	AZ (H)
(Hungary) Ferencváros	1–2	1–2	1–0	4–0	4–1	0–5	0–2	4–3

Results by Pot 3 team
Team	Matchday							
Team	1	2	3	4	5	6	7	8
(Azerbaijan) Qarabağ	TOT (A)	MAL (H)	AJX (H)	BOD (A)	LYO (H)	ELF (A)	FCSB (H)	OLY (A)
(Azerbaijan) Qarabağ	0–3	1–2	0–3	2–1	1–4	0–1	2–3	0–3
(Turkey) Galatasaray	PAOK (H)	RFS (A)	ELF (H)	TOT (H)	AZ (A)	MAL (A)	DKV (H)	AJX (A)
(Turkey) Galatasaray	3–1	2–2	4–3	3–2	1–1	2–2	3–3	1–2
(Norway) Bodø/Glimt	POR (H)	USG (A)	BRA (A)	QRB (H)	MUN (A)	BES (H)	MTA (H)	NIC (A)
(Norway) Bodø/Glimt	3–2	0–0	2–1	1–2	2–3	2–1	3–1	1–1
(Czech Republic) Viktoria Plzeň	FRA (A)	LUD (H)	PAOK (A)	RSO (H)	DKV (A)	MUN (H)	AND (H)	ATH (A)
(Czech Republic) Viktoria Plzeň	3–3	0–0	2–2	2–1	2–1	1–2	2–0	1–3
(Belgium) Union Saint-Gilloise	FEN (A)	BOD (H)	MID (A)	ROM (H)	TWE (A)	NIC (H)	BRA (H)	RAN (A)
(Belgium) Union Saint-Gilloise	1–2	0–0	0–1	1–1	1–0	2–1	2–1	1–2
(Ukraine) Dynamo Kyiv	LAZ (H)	HOF (A)	ROM (A)	FER (H)	PLZ (H)	RSO (A)	GAL (A)	RFS (H)
(Ukraine) Dynamo Kyiv	0–3	0–2	0–1	0–4	1–2	0–3	3–3	1–0
(Bulgaria) Ludogorets Razgrad	SLP (H)	PLZ (A)	AND (A)	ATH (H)	LAZ (A)	AZ (H)	MID (H)	LYO (A)
(Bulgaria) Ludogorets Razgrad	0–2	0–0	0–2	1–2	0–0	2–2	0–2	1–1
(Denmark) Midtjylland	HOF (H)	MTA (A)	USG (H)	FCSB (A)	FRA (H)	POR (A)	LUD (A)	FEN (H)
(Denmark) Midtjylland	1–1	2–0	1–0	0–2	1–2	0–2	2–0	2–2
(Sweden) Malmö FF	RAN (H)	QRB (A)	OLY (H)	BES (A)	FER (A)	GAL (H)	TWE (H)	SLP (A)
(Sweden) Malmö FF	0–2	2–1	0–1	1–2	1–4	2–2	2–3	2–2

Results by Pot 4 team
Team	Matchday							
Team	1	2	3	4	5	6	7	8
(Spain) Athletic Bilbao	ROM (A)	AZ (H)	SLP (H)	LUD (A)	ELF (H)	FEN (A)	BES (A)	PLZ (H)
(Spain) Athletic Bilbao	1–1	2–0	1–0	2–1	3–0	2–0	1–4	3–1
(Germany) TSG Hoffenheim	MID (A)	DKV (H)	POR (A)	LYO (H)	BRA (A)	FCSB (H)	TOT (H)	AND (A)
(Germany) TSG Hoffenheim	1–1	2–0	0–2	2–2	0–3	0–0	2–3	4–3
(France) Nice	RSO (H)	LAZ (A)	FER (A)	TWE (H)	RAN (H)	USG (A)	ELF (A)	BOD (H)
(France) Nice	1–1	1–4	0–1	2–2	1–4	1–2	0–1	1–1
(Belgium) Anderlecht	FER (H)	RSO (A)	LUD (H)	RFS (A)	POR (H)	SLP (A)	PLZ (A)	HOF (H)
(Belgium) Anderlecht	2–1	2–1	2–0	1–1	2–2	2–1	0–2	3–4
(Netherlands) Twente	MUN (A)	FEN (H)	LAZ (H)	NIC (A)	USG (H)	OLY (A)	MAL (A)	BES (H)
(Netherlands) Twente	1–1	1–1	0–2	2–2	0–1	0–0	3–2	1–0
(Turkey) Beşiktaş	AJX (A)	FRA (H)	LYO (A)	MAL (H)	MTA (H)	BOD (A)	ATH (H)	TWE (A)
(Turkey) Beşiktaş	0–4	1–3	1–0	2–1	1–3	1–2	4–1	0–1
(Romania) FCSB	RFS (H)	PAOK (A)	RAN (A)	MID (H)	OLY (H)	HOF (A)	QRB (A)	MUN (H)
(Romania) FCSB	4–1	1–0	0–4	2–0	0–0	0–0	3–2	0–2
(Latvia) RFS	FCSB (A)	GAL (H)	FRA (A)	AND (H)	PAOK (H)	MTA (A)	AJX (H)	DKV (A)
(Latvia) RFS	1–4	2–2	0–1	1–1	0–2	1–2	1–0	0–1
(Sweden) IF Elfsborg	AZ (A)	ROM (H)	GAL (A)	BRA (H)	ATH (A)	QRB (H)	NIC (H)	TOT (A)
(Sweden) IF Elfsborg	2–3	1–0	3–4	1–1	0–3	1–0	1–0	0–3

Source: UEFA
Scores and legend colours are listed from the perspective of the team in the "Team" column.
Legend: H = home, A = away. Green = win; Yellow = draw; Red = loss.

== Matches ==
The fixture list was announced on 31 August 2024, the day after the draw. This was to ensure no calendar clashes with teams in Champions League and Conference League playing in the same cities.

In principle, each team did not play more than two home matches or two away matches in a row, and played one home match and one away match across both the first and last two matchdays. The matches were played on 25–26 September (exclusive week), (Note: As part of the scheduling for the 2024–25 UEFA men's club season, each competition had an "exclusive week" in the calendar, with no other competitions scheduled during this week. For the Europa League, this took place on matchday 1 (25–26 September 2024).) 3 October, 24 October, 7 November, 28 November, 12 December 2024, 23 January and 30 January 2025. All matches were played on Thursdays, except for the competition's exclusive week, which also included Wednesday fixtures, as well as a few select matches due to scheduling concerns. In principle, the scheduled kick-off times were 16:30, 18:45 and 21:00 CET/CEST. All fixtures on the final matchday were played simultaneously at 21:00.

Times are CET or CEST, (Note: CEST (UTC+2) for dates up to 26 October 2024 (matchdays 1–3), and CET (UTC+1) for dates thereafter (matchdays 4–8).) as listed by UEFA (local times, if different, are in parentheses).

=== Matchday 1 ===
25 September 2024
18:45

AZ (Royal Dutch Football Association)	3–2	(Swedish Football Association) IF Elfsborg
Van Bommel 44', 50'; Parrott 74' (pen.)	Report	Ouma 23'; Hedlund 53'

AFAS Stadion, Alkmaar
Attendance: 16,371
Referee: Juxhin Xhaja (Albania)

25 September 2024
18:45

Bodø/Glimt (Norwegian Football Federation)	3–2	(Portuguese Football Federation) Porto
Høgh 15'; Hauge 40', 62'	Report	Aghehowa 8'; Gül 90'

Aspmyra Stadion, Bodø
Attendance: 7,587
Referee: Orel Grinfeld (Israel)

25 September 2024
21:00

Dynamo Kyiv (Ukrainian Association of Football)	0–3	(Italian Football Federation) Lazio
	Report	Dia 5', 35'; Dele-Bashiru 34'

Volksparkstadion, Hamburg, Germany (Note: Due to the Russian invasion of Ukraine, Ukrainian teams were required to play their home matches at neutral venues until further notice. Therefore, Dynamo Kyiv played their home matches at Volksparkstadion, Hamburg, Germany, instead of their regular stadium, Olympic Stadium, Kyiv.)
Attendance: 7,751
Referee: Anastasios Sidiropoulos (Greece)

25 September 2024
21:00

Midtjylland (Danish Football Association)	1–1	(German Football Association) TSG Hoffenheim
Osorio 42'	Report	Moerstedt 90'

MCH Arena, Herning
Attendance: 8,561
Referee: Nenad Minaković (Serbia)

25 September 2024
21:00 (22:00 UTC+3)

Galatasaray (Turkish Football Federation)	3–1	(Hellenic Football Federation) PAOK
Rahman 48' (o.g.); Akgün 75'; Icardi 90+5'	Report	Konstantelias 67'

Rams Park, Istanbul
Attendance: 50,700
Referee: Alejandro Hernández Hernández (Spain)

25 September 2024
21:00 (20:00 UTC+1)

Manchester United (The Football Association)	1–1	(Royal Dutch Football Association) Twente
Eriksen 35'	Report	Lammers 68'

Old Trafford, Manchester
Attendance: 73,069
Referee: Simone Sozza (Italy)

25 September 2024
21:00

Nice (French Football Federation)	1–1	(Royal Spanish Football Federation) Real Sociedad
Rosario 45'	Report	Barrenetxea 18'

Allianz Riviera, Nice
Attendance: 20,545
Referee: Morten Krogh (Denmark)

25 September 2024
21:00 (22:00 UTC+3)

Ludogorets Razgrad (Bulgarian Football Union)	0–2	(Football Association of the Czech Republic) Slavia Prague
	Report	Jurásek 37'; Chytil 65'

Huvepharma Arena, Razgrad
Attendance: 4,761
Referee: Jérôme Brisard (France)

25 September 2024
21:00

Anderlecht (Royal Belgian Football Association)	2–1	(Hungarian Football Federation) Ferencváros
Verschaeren 61'; Dolberg 66' (pen.)	Report	Traoré 86'

Constant Vanden Stock Stadium, Brussels
Attendance: 15,417
Referee: Julian Weinberger (Austria)

26 September 2024
18:45 (19:45 UTC+3)

Fenerbahçe (Turkish Football Federation)	2–1	(Royal Belgian Football Association) Union Saint-Gilloise
Söyüncü 26'; Burgess 82' (o.g.)	Report	Sykes 90+3'

Şükrü Saracoğlu Stadium, Istanbul
Attendance: 31,760
Referee: Benoît Bastien (France)

26 September 2024
18:45

Malmö FF (Swedish Football Association)	0–2	(Scottish Football Association) Rangers
	Report	Bajrami 1'; McCausland 76'

Stadion, Malmö
Attendance: 20,021
Referee: Luis Godinho (Portugal)

26 September 2024
21:00

Ajax (Royal Dutch Football Association)	4–0	(Turkish Football Federation) Beşiktaş
Fitz-Jim 31'; Godts 51', 73'; Taylor 55'	Report

Johan Cruyff Arena, Amsterdam
Attendance: 54,010
Referee: John Brooks (England)

26 September 2024
21:00

Roma (Italian Football Federation)	1–1	(Royal Spanish Football Federation) Athletic Bilbao
Dovbyk 32'	Report	Paredes 85'

Stadio Olimpico, Rome
Attendance: 63,072
Referee: Georgi Kabakov (Bulgaria)

26 September 2024
21:00

Eintracht Frankfurt (German Football Association)	3–3	(Football Association of the Czech Republic) Viktoria Plzeň
Ekitike 38'; Dina Ebimbe 62'; Kristensen 67'	Report	Šulc 41'; Adu 86'; Jemelka 90+3'

Waldstadion, Frankfurt
Attendance: 56,500
Referee: Mykola Balakin (Ukraine)

26 September 2024
21:00 (22:00 UTC+3)

FCSB (Romanian Football Federation)	4–1	(Latvian Football Federation) RFS
Bîrligea 8'; Ștefănescu 32'; Olaru 58', 69'	Report	Lipušček 23'

Arena Națională, Bucharest
Attendance: 34,257
Referee: Ricardo de Burgos Bengoetxea (Spain)

26 September 2024
21:00

Lyon (French Football Federation)	2–0	(Hellenic Football Federation) Olympiacos
Cherki 65'; Benrahma 71'	Report

Parc Olympique Lyonnais, Décines-Charpieu
Attendance: 24,412
Referee: Lawrence Visser (Belgium)

26 September 2024
21:00 (20:00 UTC+1)

Braga (Portuguese Football Federation)	2–1	(Israel Football Association) Maccabi Tel Aviv
Bruma 88', 90+5' (pen.)	Report	Davida 30' (pen.)

Estádio Municipal, Braga
Attendance: 10,519
Referee: Matej Jug (Slovenia)

26 September 2024
21:35 (20:35 UTC+1) (Note: The Tottenham Hotspur v Qarabağ match, originally scheduled for 21:00 (20:00 UTC+1), was delayed to 21:35 (20:35 UTC+1) due to late team arrival caused by heavy traffic.)

Tottenham Hotspur (The Football Association)	3–0	(Association of Football Federations of Azerbaijan) Qarabağ
Johnson 12'; Sarr 52'; Solanke 68'	Report

Tottenham Hotspur Stadium, London
Attendance: 51,757
Referee: Willy Delajod (France)

=== Matchday 2 ===
3 October 2024
18:45 (19:45 UTC+3)

RFS (Latvian Football Federation)	2–2	(Turkish Football Federation) Galatasaray
Ikaunieks 40'; Odisharia 55'	Report	Mertens 12'; Akgün 38'

Daugava Stadium, Riga (Note: RFS played their home matches at Daugava Stadium, Riga, instead of their regular stadium, LNK Sporta Parks, Riga, which did not meet UEFA requirements.)
Attendance: 8,502
Referee: Filip Glova (Slovakia)

3 October 2024
18:45

Ferencváros (Hungarian Football Federation)	1–2	(The Football Association) Tottenham Hotspur
B. Varga 90'	Report	Sarr 23'; Johnson 86'

Ferencváros Stadion, Budapest
Attendance: 20,795
Referee: Igor Pajač (Croatia)

3 October 2024
18:45

Maccabi Tel Aviv (Israel Football Association)	0–2	(Danish Football Association) Midtjylland
	Report	Franculino 39'; Chilufya 89'

Partizan Stadium, Belgrade, Serbia (Note: Due to the Gaza war, Israeli teams were required to play their home matches at neutral venues until further notice. Therefore, Maccabi Tel Aviv played their home matches at Partizan Stadium, Belgrade, Serbia, instead of their regular stadium, Bloomfield Stadium, Tel Aviv.)
Attendance: 200
Referee: Giorgi Kruashvili (Georgia)

3 October 2024
18:45 (19:45 UTC+3)

Olympiacos (Hellenic Football Federation)	3–0	(Portuguese Football Federation) Braga
El Kaabi 45', 59'; Hezze 53'	Report

Karaiskakis Stadium, Piraeus
Attendance: 30,301
Referee: Damian Sylwestrzak (Poland)

3 October 2024
18:45 (20:45 UTC+4)

Qarabağ (Association of Football Federations of Azerbaijan)	1–2	(Swedish Football Association) Malmö FF
Juninho 15'	Report	Botheim 19', 47'

Tofiq Bahramov Republican Stadium, Baku
Attendance: 28,234
Referee: Anastasios Papapetrou (Greece)

3 October 2024
18:45

Real Sociedad (Royal Spanish Football Federation)	1–2	(Royal Belgian Football Association) Anderlecht
Marín 5'	Report	Vázquez 28'; Leoni 39'

Anoeta, San Sebastián
Attendance: 30,985
Referee: Marian Barbu (Romania)

3 October 2024
18:45

Lazio (Italian Football Federation)	4–1	(French Football Federation) Nice
Pedro 20'; Castellanos 35', 53'; Zaccagni 67' (pen.)	Report	Boga 41'

Stadio Olimpico, Rome
Attendance: 27,314
Referee: Horațiu Feșnic (Romania)

3 October 2024
18:45

Slavia Prague (Football Association of the Czech Republic)	1–1	(Royal Dutch Football Association) Ajax
Chorý 67'	Report	Van den Boomen 18' (pen.)

Fortuna Arena, Prague
Attendance: 19,296
Referee: Andris Treimanis (Latvia)

3 October 2024
18:45

TSG Hoffenheim (German Football Association)	2–0	(Ukrainian Association of Football) Dynamo Kyiv
Hložek 22', 60'	Report

Rhein-Neckar-Arena, Sinsheim
Attendance: 20,351
Referee: Aleksandar Stavrev (North Macedonia)

3 October 2024
21:00

Athletic Bilbao (Royal Spanish Football Federation)	2–0	(Royal Dutch Football Association) AZ
I. Williams 72'; Sancet 85'	Report

San Mamés, Bilbao
Attendance: 40,328
Referee: Balázs Berke (Hungary)

3 October 2024
21:00 (22:00 UTC+3)

Beşiktaş (Turkish Football Federation)	1–3	(German Football Association) Eintracht Frankfurt
Masuaku 90+3'	Report	Marmoush 19' (pen.); Dina Ebimbe 22'; Knauff 82'

Beşiktaş Stadium, Istanbul
Attendance: 35,305
Referee: John Beaton (Scotland)

3 October 2024
21:00 (20:00 UTC+1)

Porto (Portuguese Football Federation)	3–3	(The Football Association) Manchester United
Pepê 27'; Aghehowa 34', 50'	Report	Rashford 7'; Højlund 20'; Maguire 90+1'

Estádio do Dragão, Porto
Attendance: 49,211
Referee: Tobias Stieler (Germany)

3 October 2024
21:00

Twente (Royal Dutch Football Association)	1–1	(Turkish Football Federation) Fenerbahçe
Vlap 29'	Report	Tadić 71'

De Grolsch Veste, Enschede
Attendance: 29,000
Referee: Chris Kavanagh (England)

3 October 2024
21:00

Viktoria Plzeň (Football Association of the Czech Republic)	0–0	(Bulgarian Football Union) Ludogorets Razgrad
	Report

Doosan Arena, Plzeň
Attendance: 10,317
Referee: Tamás Bognár (Hungary)

3 October 2024
21:00

IF Elfsborg (Swedish Football Association)	1–0	(Italian Football Federation) Roma
Baidoo 44' (pen.)	Report

Borås Arena, Borås
Attendance: 11,978
Referee: Kristo Tohver (Estonia)

3 October 2024
21:00 (22:00 UTC+3)

PAOK (Hellenic Football Federation)	0–1	(Romanian Football Federation) FCSB
	Report	Bîrligea 45+8'

Toumba Stadium, Thessaloniki
Attendance: 14,340
Referee: Sascha Stegemann (Germany)

3 October 2024
21:00

Union Saint-Gilloise (Royal Belgian Football Association)	0–0	(Norwegian Football Federation) Bodø/Glimt
	Report

King Baudouin Stadium, Brussels (Note: Union Saint-Gilloise played their home matches at King Baudouin Stadium, Brussels, instead of their regular stadium, Joseph Marien Stadium, Brussels, which did not meet UEFA requirements.)
Attendance: 5,576
Referee: Ondřej Berka (Czech Republic)

3 October 2024
21:00 (20:00 UTC+1)

Rangers (Scottish Football Association)	1–4	(French Football Federation) Lyon
Lawrence 14'	Report	Fofana 10', 55'; Lacazette 19', 45+1'

Ibrox Stadium, Glasgow
Attendance: 41,981
Referee: Sven Jablonski (Germany)

=== Matchday 3 ===
23 October 2024
16:30 (17:30 UTC+3)

Galatasaray (Turkish Football Federation)	4–3	(Swedish Football Association) IF Elfsborg
Icardi 28'; Pettersson 39' (o.g.); Yılmaz 44'; Akgün 83'	Report	Hult 52'; Baidoo 65' (pen.); Larsson 90+2'

Rams Park, Istanbul
Attendance: 36,938
Referee: Matej Jug (Slovenia)

23 October 2024
16:30 (15:30 UTC+1)

Braga (Portuguese Football Federation)	1–2	(Norwegian Football Federation) Bodø/Glimt
Niakaté 64'	Report	Evjen 53'; Nielsen 90+4'

Estádio Municipal, Braga
Attendance: 8,253
Referee: Nenad Minaković (Serbia)

24 October 2024
18:45

Roma (Italian Football Federation)	1–0	(Ukrainian Association of Football) Dynamo Kyiv
Dovbyk 23' (pen.)	Report

Stadio Olimpico, Rome
Attendance: 61,624
Referee: Serdar Gözübüyük (Netherlands)

24 October 2024
18:45

Eintracht Frankfurt (German Football Association)	1–0	(Latvian Football Federation) RFS
Larsson 79'	Report

Waldstadion, Frankfurt
Attendance: 56,600
Referee: Allard Lindhout (Netherlands)

24 October 2024
18:45

Midtjylland (Danish Football Association)	1–0	(Royal Belgian Football Association) Union Saint-Gilloise
Diao 18'	Report

MCH Arena, Herning
Attendance: 8,491
Referee: Sebastian Gishamer (Austria)

24 October 2024
18:45

Ferencváros (Hungarian Football Federation)	1–0	(French Football Federation) Nice
Bombito 15' (o.g.)	Report

Ferencváros Stadion, Budapest
Attendance: 18,371
Referee: Anastasios Sidiropoulos (Greece)

24 October 2024
18:45

Maccabi Tel Aviv (Israel Football Association)	1–2	(Royal Spanish Football Federation) Real Sociedad
Turgeman 81'	Report	Pacheco 19'; Gómez 64'

Partizan Stadium, Belgrade, Serbia
Attendance: 429
Referee: Rohit Saggi (Norway)

24 October 2024
18:45 (19:45 UTC+3)

PAOK (Hellenic Football Federation)	2–2	(Football Association of the Czech Republic) Viktoria Plzeň
Tissoudali 84'; Rahman 90+3'	Report	Havel 31'; Vydra 39'

Toumba Stadium, Thessaloniki
Attendance: 16,144
Referee: Urs Schnyder (Switzerland)

24 October 2024
18:45 (20:45 UTC+4)

Qarabağ (Association of Football Federations of Azerbaijan)	0–3	(Royal Dutch Football Association) Ajax
	Report	Taylor 36'; Weghorst 74' (pen.); Akpom 77'

Tofiq Bahramov Republican Stadium, Baku
Attendance: 27,520
Referee: Nick Walsh (Scotland)

24 October 2024
21:00

Athletic Bilbao (Royal Spanish Football Federation)	1–0	(Football Association of the Czech Republic) Slavia Prague
N. Williams 33'	Report

San Mamés, Bilbao
Attendance: 47,776
Referee: Morten Krogh (Denmark)

24 October 2024
21:00 (20:00 UTC+1)

Porto (Portuguese Football Federation)	2–0	(German Football Association) TSG Hoffenheim
Djaló 45+2'; Aghehowa 75'	Report

Estádio do Dragão, Porto
Attendance: 39,203
Referee: Damian Sylwestrzak (Poland)

24 October 2024
21:00

Twente (Royal Dutch Football Association)	0–2	(Italian Football Federation) Lazio
	Report	Pedro 35'; Isaksen 87'

De Grolsch Veste, Enschede
Attendance: 29,500
Referee: Nikola Dabanović (Montenegro)

24 October 2024
21:00 (22:00 UTC+3)

Fenerbahçe (Turkish Football Federation)	1–1	(The Football Association) Manchester United
En-Nesyri 49'	Report	Eriksen 15'

Şükrü Saracoğlu Stadium, Istanbul
Attendance: 41,443
Referee: Clément Turpin (France)

24 October 2024
21:00

Malmö FF (Swedish Football Association)	0–1	(Hellenic Football Federation) Olympiacos
	Report	El Kaabi 30'

Stadion, Malmö
Attendance: 19,478
Referee: Simone Sozza (Italy)

24 October 2024
21:00

Lyon (French Football Federation)	0–1	(Turkish Football Federation) Beşiktaş
	Report	Fernandes 71'

Parc Olympique Lyonnais, Décines-Charpieu
Attendance: 27,350
Referee: Harm Osmers (Germany)

24 October 2024
21:00 (20:00 UTC+1)

Rangers (Scottish Football Association)	4–0	(Romanian Football Federation) FCSB
Lawrence 10'; Černý 31', 55'; Igamane 71'	Report

Ibrox Stadium, Glasgow
Attendance: 41,191
Referee: Marco Di Bello (Italy)

24 October 2024
21:00

Anderlecht (Royal Belgian Football Association)	2–0	(Bulgarian Football Union) Ludogorets Razgrad
Edozie 67'; Dreyer 90+5'	Report

Constant Vanden Stock Stadium, Brussels
Attendance: 18,000
Referee: Filip Glova (Slovakia)

24 October 2024
21:00 (20:00 UTC+1)

Tottenham Hotspur (The Football Association)	1–0	(Royal Dutch Football Association) AZ
Richarlison 53' (pen.)	Report

Tottenham Hotspur Stadium, London
Attendance: 53,438
Referee: Manfredas Lukjančukas (Lithuania)

=== Matchday 4 ===
6 November 2024
16:30 (18:30 UTC+3)

Beşiktaş (Turkish Football Federation)	2–1	(Swedish Football Association) Malmö FF
Muçi 76'; Kılıçsoy 85'	Report	Rieks 90+3'

Beşiktaş Stadium, Istanbul
Attendance: 24,652
Referee: Sven Jablonski (Germany)

7 November 2024
18:45

Eintracht Frankfurt (German Football Association)	1–0	(Football Association of the Czech Republic) Slavia Prague
Marmoush 53'	Report

Waldstadion, Frankfurt
Attendance: 57,350
Referee: Chris Kavanagh (England)

7 November 2024
18:45

Bodø/Glimt (Norwegian Football Federation)	1–2	(Association of Football Federations of Azerbaijan) Qarabağ
Berg 41'	Report	Bayramov 22'; Zoubir 69'

Aspmyra Stadion, Bodø
Attendance: 6,011
Referee: Luis Godinho (Portugal)

7 November 2024
18:45 (19:45 UTC+2)

FCSB (Romanian Football Federation)	2–0	(Danish Football Association) Midtjylland
Tănase 16'; Bîrligea 46'	Report

Arena Națională, Bucharest
Attendance: 37,152
Referee: Duje Strukan (Croatia)

7 November 2024
18:45 (20:45 UTC+3)

Galatasaray (Turkish Football Federation)	3–2	(The Football Association) Tottenham Hotspur
Akgün 6'; Osimhen 31', 39'	Report	Lankshear 18'; Solanke 69'

Rams Park, Istanbul
Attendance: 51,739
Referee: Lawrence Visser (Belgium)

7 November 2024
18:45

IF Elfsborg (Swedish Football Association)	1–1	(Portuguese Football Federation) Braga
Holten 84'	Report	Ouma 67' (o.g.)

Borås Arena, Borås
Attendance: 9,402
Referee: Juxhin Xhaja (Albania)

7 November 2024
18:45

Nice (French Football Federation)	2–2	(Royal Dutch Football Association) Twente
Boga 66'; Cho 88'	Report	D. Rots 8'; Lammers 60'

Allianz Riviera, Nice
Attendance: 11,144
Referee: Balázs Berke (Hungary)

7 November 2024
18:45 (19:45 UTC+2)

Olympiacos (Hellenic Football Federation)	1–1	(Scottish Football Association) Rangers
El Kaabi 56'	Report	Dessers 64'

Karaiskakis Stadium, Piraeus
Attendance: 31,795
Referee: Sascha Stegemann (Germany)

7 November 2024
18:45 (19:45 UTC+2)

Ludogorets Razgrad (Bulgarian Football Union)	1–2	(Royal Spanish Football Federation) Athletic Bilbao
Erick Marcus 20'	Report	I. Williams 73'; Serrano 74'

Huvepharma Arena, Razgrad
Attendance: 9,725
Referee: Anastasios Papapetrou (Greece)

7 November 2024
18:45

Union Saint-Gilloise (Royal Belgian Football Association)	1–1	(Italian Football Federation) Roma
Mac Allister 77'	Report	Mancini 62'

King Baudouin Stadium, Brussels
Attendance: 13,875
Referee: Jérôme Brisard (France)

7 November 2024
21:00

Ajax (Royal Dutch Football Association)	5–0	(Israel Football Association) Maccabi Tel Aviv
Traoré 14'; Taylor 27'; Godts 39'; Brobbey 61'; Fitz-Jim 69'	Report

Johan Cruyff Arena, Amsterdam
Attendance: 53,719
Referee: Ondřej Berka (Czech Republic)

7 November 2024
21:00

AZ (Royal Dutch Football Association)	3–1	(Turkish Football Federation) Fenerbahçe
Daal 59'; Smit 75'; Kasius 87'	Report	En-Nesyri 70'

AFAS Stadion, Alkmaar
Attendance: 15,383
Referee: John Beaton (Scotland)

7 November 2024
21:00

Dynamo Kyiv (Ukrainian Association of Football)	0–4	(Hungarian Football Federation) Ferencváros
	Report	B. Varga 54', 67'; Zachariassen 56'; Saldanha 76'

Volksparkstadion, Hamburg, Germany
Attendance: 5,338
Referee: Mohammed Al-Hakim (Sweden)

7 November 2024
21:00 (22:00 UTC+2)

RFS (Latvian Football Federation)	1–1	(Royal Belgian Football Association) Anderlecht
Ndiaye 90+6' (o.g.)	Report	Stroeykens 85'

Daugava Stadium, Riga
Attendance: 4,820
Referee: Aleksandar Stavrev (North Macedonia)

7 November 2024
21:00

Viktoria Plzeň (Football Association of the Czech Republic)	2–1	(Royal Spanish Football Federation) Real Sociedad
Adu 13'; Vašulín 90'	Report	Óskarsson 35'

Doosan Arena, Plzeň
Attendance: 11,130
Referee: Andris Treimanis (Latvia)

7 November 2024
21:00 (20:00 UTC+0)

Manchester United (The Football Association)	2–0	(Hellenic Football Federation) PAOK
Amad 50', 77'	Report

Old Trafford, Manchester
Attendance: 73,174
Referee: Radu Petrescu (Romania)

7 November 2024
21:00

Lazio (Italian Football Federation)	2–1	(Portuguese Football Federation) Porto
Romagnoli 45+2'; Pedro 90+2'	Report	Eustáquio 66'

Stadio Olimpico, Rome
Attendance: 29,576
Referee: Georgi Kabakov (Bulgaria)

7 November 2024
21:00

TSG Hoffenheim (German Football Association)	2–2	(French Football Federation) Lyon
Gendrey 47'; Tohumcu 90+6'	Report	Abner 66'; Lacazette 90+3'

Rhein-Neckar-Arena, Sinsheim
Attendance: 18,227
Referee: Marian Barbu (Romania)

=== Matchday 5 ===
28 November 2024
18:45

Athletic Bilbao (Royal Spanish Football Federation)	3–0	(Swedish Football Association) IF Elfsborg
Boiro 6'; Prados 24'; Guruzeta 54'	Report

San Mamés, Bilbao
Attendance: 46,325
Referee: Giorgi Kruashvili (Georgia)

28 November 2024
18:45

AZ (Royal Dutch Football Association)	1–1	(Turkish Football Federation) Galatasaray
Mijnans 2'	Report	Osimhen 43'

AFAS Stadion, Alkmaar
Attendance: 16,229
Referee: Horațiu Feșnic (Romania)

28 November 2024
18:45

Beşiktaş (Turkish Football Federation)	1–3	(Israel Football Association) Maccabi Tel Aviv
Silva 38'	Report	Kanichowsky 23'; Peretz 45+3'; Patati 81'

Nagyerdei Stadion, Debrecen, Hungary (Note: Due to a strain on Israel–Turkey relations related to the Gaza war, Turkish authorities requested the Beşiktaş v Maccabi Tel Aviv match to be played at a neutral venue. Therefore, Beşiktaş played their home match at Nagyerdei Stadion, Debrecen, Hungary, instead of their regular stadium, Beşiktaş Stadium, Istanbul. Following a request from local authorities, it was also played behind closed doors.)
Attendance: 0
Referee: Simone Sozza (Italy)

28 November 2024
18:45

Dynamo Kyiv (Ukrainian Association of Football)	1–2	(Football Association of the Czech Republic) Viktoria Plzeň
Kabayev 90+5'	Report	Vydra 55'; Šulc 90'

Volksparkstadion, Hamburg, Germany
Attendance: 4,456
Referee: Luis Godinho (Portugal)

28 November 2024
18:45 (19:45 UTC+2)

RFS (Latvian Football Federation)	0–2	(Hellenic Football Federation) PAOK
	Report	Despodov 2'; Chalov 59'

Daugava Stadium, Riga
Attendance: 5,346
Referee: Julian Weinberger (Austria)

28 November 2024
18:45 (21:45 UTC+4)

Qarabağ (Association of Football Federations of Azerbaijan)	1–4	(French Football Federation) Lyon
Perri 88' (o.g.)	Report	Mikautadze 15', 80'; Tolisso 63'; Fofana 68'

Tofiq Bahramov Republican Stadium, Baku
Attendance: 22,563
Referee: Nenad Minaković (Serbia)

28 November 2024
18:45

Anderlecht (Royal Belgian Football Association)	2–2	(Portuguese Football Federation) Porto
Degreef 52'; Amuzu 86'	Report	Galeno 24' (pen.); Vieira 83'

Constant Vanden Stock Stadium, Brussels
Attendance: 17,717
Referee: Morten Krogh (Denmark)

28 November 2024
18:45

Lazio (Italian Football Federation)	0–0	(Bulgarian Football Union) Ludogorets Razgrad
	Report

Stadio Olimpico, Rome
Attendance: 27,259
Referee: Duje Strukan (Croatia)

28 November 2024
21:00

Midtjylland (Danish Football Association)	1–2	(German Football Association) Eintracht Frankfurt
Collins 48' (o.g.)	Report	Larsson 7'; Marmoush 57' (pen.)

MCH Arena, Herning
Attendance: 9,521
Referee: Craig Pawson (England)

28 November 2024
21:00

Twente (Royal Dutch Football Association)	0–1	(Royal Belgian Football Association) Union Saint-Gilloise
	Report	Fuseini 11'

De Grolsch Veste, Enschede
Attendance: 26,500
Referee: John Beaton (Scotland)

28 November 2024
21:00

Ferencváros (Hungarian Football Federation)	4–1	(Swedish Football Association) Malmö FF
B. Varga 8' (pen.), 11'; Kady 53'; Cissé 74'	Report	Botheim 18' (pen.)

Ferencváros Stadion, Budapest
Attendance: 18,891
Referee: Aliyar Aghayev (Azerbaijan)

28 November 2024
21:00 (22:00 UTC+2)

FCSB (Romanian Football Federation)	0–0	(Hellenic Football Federation) Olympiacos
	Report

Arena Națională, Bucharest
Attendance: 43,572
Referee: Sebastian Gishamer (Austria)

28 November 2024
21:00 (20:00 UTC+0)

Manchester United (The Football Association)	3–2	(Norwegian Football Federation) Bodø/Glimt
Garnacho 1'; Højlund 45', 50'	Report	Evjen 19'; Zinckernagel 23'

Old Trafford, Manchester
Attendance: 72,985
Referee: Lawrence Visser (Belgium)

28 November 2024
21:00

Nice (French Football Federation)	1–4	(Scottish Football Association) Rangers
Bouanani 83'	Report	Černý 35'; Diomande 38'; Igamane 45+3', 54'

Allianz Riviera, Nice
Attendance: 18,008
Referee: Ricardo de Burgos Bengoetxea (Spain)

28 November 2024
21:00

Real Sociedad (Royal Spanish Football Federation)	2–0	(Royal Dutch Football Association) Ajax
Barrentexea 67'; Kubo 85'	Report

Anoeta, San Sebastián
Attendance: 32,786
Referee: Matej Jug (Slovenia)

28 November 2024
21:00 (20:00 UTC+0)

Braga (Portuguese Football Federation)	3–0	(German Football Association) TSG Hoffenheim
Bruma 2'; Fernandes 8'; Carvalho 90+5'	Report

Estádio Municipal, Braga
Attendance: 10,010
Referee: Igor Pajač (Croatia)

28 November 2024
21:00

Slavia Prague (Football Association of the Czech Republic)	1–2	(Turkish Football Federation) Fenerbahçe
Chorý 7'	Report	Džeko 35'; En-Nesyri 85'

Fortuna Arena, Prague
Attendance: 19,308
Referee: Sascha Stegemann (Germany)

28 November 2024
21:00 (20:00 UTC+0)

Tottenham Hotspur (The Football Association)	2–2	(Italian Football Federation) Roma
Son Heung-min 5' (pen.); Johnson 33'	Report	Ndicka 20'; Hummels 90+1'

Tottenham Hotspur Stadium, London
Attendance: 53,378
Referee: Glenn Nyberg (Sweden)

=== Matchday 6 ===
11 December 2024
16:30 (18:30 UTC+3)

Fenerbahçe (Turkish Football Federation)	0–2	(Royal Spanish Football Federation) Athletic Bilbao
	Report	I. Williams 5', 45'

Şükrü Saracoğlu Stadium, Istanbul
Attendance: 35,263
Referee: Irfan Peljto (Bosnia and Herzegovina)

12 December 2024
18:45

Roma (Italian Football Federation)	3–0	(Portuguese Football Federation) Braga
Pellegrini 10'; Abdulhamid 47'; Hermoso 90+1'	Report

Stadio Olimpico, Rome
Attendance: 59,085
Referee: Daniel Siebert (Germany)

12 December 2024
18:45

Viktoria Plzeň (Football Association of the Czech Republic)	1–2	(The Football Association) Manchester United
Vydra 48'	Report	Højlund 62', 88'

Doosan Arena, Plzeň
Attendance: 11,320
Referee: Marian Barbu (Romania)

12 December 2024
18:45

Malmö FF (Swedish Football Association)	2–2	(Turkish Football Federation) Galatasaray
Botheim 24'; Peña 90+2'	Report	Jelert 43'; Akgün 56'

Stadion, Malmö
Attendance: 19,489
Referee: John Brooks (England)

12 December 2024
18:45 (19:45 UTC+2)

Olympiacos (Hellenic Football Federation)	0–0	(Royal Dutch Football Association) Twente
	Report

Karaiskakis Stadium, Piraeus
Attendance: 31,600
Referee: Jérôme Brisard (France)

12 December 2024
18:45 (19:45 UTC+2)

PAOK (Hellenic Football Federation)	5–0	(Hungarian Football Federation) Ferencváros
Taison 10'; Brandon 29'; Chalov 76'; Živković 80' (pen.); Despodov 89'	Report

Toumba Stadium, Thessaloniki
Attendance: 18,121
Referee: Guillermo Cuadra Fernández (Spain)

12 December 2024
18:45 (19:45 UTC+2)

Ludogorets Razgrad (Bulgarian Football Union)	2–2	(Royal Dutch Football Association) AZ
Chochev 60'; Duah 63'	Report	Van Bommel 13'; Maikuma 19'

Huvepharma Arena, Razgrad
Attendance: 4,245
Referee: Kristo Tohver (Estonia)

12 December 2024
18:45

Union Saint-Gilloise (Royal Belgian Football Association)	2–1	(French Football Federation) Nice
Ivanović 33', 90+2'	Report	Guessand 45+1'

King Baudouin Stadium, Brussels
Attendance: 7,501
Referee: Chris Kavanagh (England)

12 December 2024
18:45

TSG Hoffenheim (German Football Association)	0–0	(Romanian Football Federation) FCSB
	Report

Rhein-Neckar-Arena, Sinsheim
Attendance: 23,223
Referee: Juxhin Xhaja (Albania)

12 December 2024
21:00

Ajax (Royal Dutch Football Association)	1–3	(Italian Football Federation) Lazio
Traoré 47'	Report	Tchaouna 12'; Dele-Bashiru 52'; Pedro 77'

Johan Cruyff Arena, Amsterdam
Attendance: 50,127
Referee: Ivan Kružliak (Slovakia)

12 December 2024
21:00 (20:00 UTC+0)

Porto (Portuguese Football Federation)	2–0	(Danish Football Association) Midtjylland
Namaso 30'; Aghehowa 56'	Report

Estádio do Dragão, Porto
Attendance: 36,619
Referee: Aleksandar Stavrev (North Macedonia)

12 December 2024
21:00

Bodø/Glimt (Norwegian Football Federation)	2–1	(Turkish Football Federation) Beşiktaş
Zinckernagel 37'; Bjørtuft 43'	Report	Fernandes 21'

Aspmyra Stadion, Bodø
Attendance: 5,813
Referee: Filip Glova (Slovakia)

12 December 2024
21:00

IF Elfsborg (Swedish Football Association)	1–0	(Association of Football Federations of Azerbaijan) Qarabağ
Qasem 57'	Report

Borås Arena, Borås
Attendance: 6,278
Referee: António Nobre (Portugal)

12 December 2024
21:00

Maccabi Tel Aviv (Israel Football Association)	2–1	(Latvian Football Federation) RFS
Nachmias 16'; Stojić 69'	Report	Savaļnieks 52'

Partizan Stadium, Belgrade, Serbia
Attendance: 253
Referee: Tamás Bognár (Hungary)

12 December 2024
21:00

Lyon (French Football Federation)	3–2	(German Football Association) Eintracht Frankfurt
Cherki 27'; Fofana 50'; Nuamah 54'	Report	Knauff 18'; Marmoush 85'

Parc Olympique Lyonnais, Décines-Charpieu
Attendance: 41,091
Referee: Andris Treimanis (Latvia)

12 December 2024
21:00 (20:00 UTC+0)

Rangers (Scottish Football Association)	1–1	(The Football Association) Tottenham Hotspur
Igamane 47'	Report	Kulusevski 75'

Ibrox Stadium, Glasgow
Attendance: 48,064
Referee: Sandro Schärer (Switzerland)

12 December 2024
21:00

Real Sociedad (Royal Spanish Football Federation)	3–0	(Ukrainian Association of Football) Dynamo Kyiv
Oyarzabal 19', 33'; Becker 24'	Report

Anoeta, San Sebastián
Attendance: 26,457
Referee: Harm Osmers (Germany)

12 December 2024
21:00

Slavia Prague (Football Association of the Czech Republic)	1–2	(Royal Belgian Football Association) Anderlecht
Chorý 58'	Report	Angulo 8'; Verschaeren 31'

Fortuna Arena, Prague
Attendance: 19,167
Referee: Anastasios Papapetrou (Greece)

=== Matchday 7 ===
21 January 2025
16:30 (18:30 UTC+3)

Galatasaray (Turkish Football Federation)	3–3	(Ukrainian Association of Football) Dynamo Kyiv
Sánchez 6'; Bardakcı 21'; Osimhen 53' (pen.)	Report	Vanat 44'; Yarmolenko 68', 81'

Rams Park, Istanbul
Attendance: 45,273
Referee: Kristo Tohver (Estonia)

22 January 2025
16:30 (18:30 UTC+3)

Beşiktaş (Turkish Football Federation)	4–1	(Royal Spanish Football Federation) Athletic Bilbao
Rashica 17', 60'; Silva 77'; João Mário 90+2' (pen.)	Report	Gómez 45'

Beşiktaş Stadium, Istanbul
Attendance: 35,980
Referee: Julian Weinberger (Austria)

23 January 2025
18:45

AZ (Royal Dutch Football Association)	1–0	(Italian Football Federation) Roma
Parrott 80'	Report

AFAS Stadion, Alkmaar
Attendance: 18,635
Referee: Irfan Peljto (Bosnia and Herzegovina)

23 January 2025
18:45 (17:45 UTC+0)

Porto (Portuguese Football Federation)	0–1	(Hellenic Football Federation) Olympiacos
	Report	El Kaabi 79'

Estádio do Dragão, Porto
Attendance: 35,357
Referee: Clément Turpin (France)

23 January 2025
18:45

Viktoria Plzeň (Football Association of the Czech Republic)	2–0	(Royal Belgian Football Association) Anderlecht
Červ 3'; Adu 45'	Report

Doosan Arena, Plzeň
Attendance: 10,972
Referee: António Nobre (Portugal)

23 January 2025
18:45 (20:45 UTC+3)

Fenerbahçe (Turkish Football Federation)	0–0	(French Football Federation) Lyon
	Report

Şükrü Saracoğlu Stadium, Istanbul
Attendance: 36,722
Referee: Simone Sozza (Italy)

23 January 2025
18:45

Bodø/Glimt (Norwegian Football Federation)	3–1	(Israel Football Association) Maccabi Tel Aviv
Høgh 39', 65' (pen.); Evjen 62'	Report	Peretz 12'

Aspmyra Stadion, Bodø
Attendance: 3,989
Referee: Ricardo de Burgos Bengoetxea (Spain)

23 January 2025
18:45

Malmö FF (Swedish Football Association)	2–3	(Royal Dutch Football Association) Twente
Johnsen 32'; Christiansen 79'	Report	Steijn 28' (pen.); Van Wolfswinkel 61' (pen.); Lagerbielke 64'

Stadion, Malmö
Attendance: 16,432
Referee: Sascha Stegemann (Germany)

23 January 2025
18:45 (21:45 UTC+4)

Qarabağ (Association of Football Federations of Azerbaijan)	2–3	(Romanian Football Federation) FCSB
L. Andrade 1'; Dawa 41' (o.g.)	Report	Șut 7', 73'; Miculescu 45+4'

Tofiq Bahramov Republican Stadium, Baku
Attendance: 16,583
Referee: Filip Glova (Slovakia)

23 January 2025
18:45

TSG Hoffenheim (German Football Association)	2–3	(The Football Association) Tottenham Hotspur
Stach 68'; Mokwa 88'	Report	Maddison 3'; Son Heung-min 22', 77'

Rhein-Neckar-Arena, Sinsheim
Attendance: 30,150
Referee: Morten Krogh (Denmark)

23 January 2025
21:00

Eintracht Frankfurt (German Football Association)	2–0	(Hungarian Football Federation) Ferencváros
Uzun 49'; Ekitike 59'	Report

Waldstadion, Frankfurt
Attendance: 55,500
Referee: Enea Jorgji (Albania)

23 January 2025
21:00 (22:00 UTC+2)

RFS (Latvian Football Federation)	1–0	(Royal Dutch Football Association) Ajax
Markhiyev 78'	Report

Daugava Stadium, Riga
Attendance: 10,233
Referee: Marian Barbu (Romania)

23 January 2025
21:00

IF Elfsborg (Swedish Football Association)	1–0	(French Football Federation) Nice
Henriksson 62'	Report

Borås Arena, Borås
Attendance: 7,566
Referee: Igor Pajač (Croatia)

23 January 2025
21:00 (20:00 UTC+0)

Manchester United (The Football Association)	2–1	(Scottish Football Association) Rangers
Butland 52' (o.g.); Fernandes 90+2'	Report	Dessers 88'

Old Trafford, Manchester
Attendance: 73,288
Referee: Erik Lambrechts (Belgium)

23 January 2025
21:00 (22:00 UTC+2)

PAOK (Hellenic Football Federation)	2–0	(Football Association of the Czech Republic) Slavia Prague
Schwab 26' (pen.); Konstantelias 56'	Report

Toumba Stadium, Thessaloniki
Attendance: 17,507
Referee: Matej Jug (Slovenia)

23 January 2025
21:00 (22:00 UTC+2)

Ludogorets Razgrad (Bulgarian Football Union)	0–2	(Danish Football Association) Midtjylland
	Report	Osorio 18'; Byskov 90+5'

Huvepharma Arena, Razgrad
Attendance: 3,847
Referee: Mohammed Al-Hakim (Sweden)

23 January 2025
21:00

Union Saint-Gilloise (Royal Belgian Football Association)	2–1	(Portuguese Football Federation) Braga
Ivanović 50', 74'	Report	El Ouazzani 16'

King Baudouin Stadium, Brussels
Attendance: 7,729
Referee: Nick Walsh (Scotland)

23 January 2025
21:00

Lazio (Italian Football Federation)	3–1	(Royal Spanish Football Federation) Real Sociedad
Gila 5'; Zaccagni 32'; Castellanos 34'	Report	Barrenetxea 82'

Stadio Olimpico, Rome
Attendance: 32,635
Referee: Lawrence Visser (Belgium)

=== Matchday 8 ===
30 January 2025
21:00

Ajax (Royal Dutch Football Association)	2–1	(Turkish Football Federation) Galatasaray
Traoré 23'; Fitz-Jim 58'	Report	Osimhen 90+4'

Johan Cruyff Arena, Amsterdam
Attendance: 54,100
Referee: Jesús Gil Manzano (Spain)

30 January 2025
21:00

Roma (Italian Football Federation)	2–0	(German Football Association) Eintracht Frankfurt
Angeliño 44'; Shomurodov 69'	Report

Stadio Olimpico, Rome
Attendance: 64,458
Referee: Rade Obrenović (Slovenia)

30 January 2025
21:00

Athletic Bilbao (Royal Spanish Football Federation)	3–1	(Football Association of the Czech Republic) Viktoria Plzeň
N. Williams 25'; Yeray 64'; Martón 90+5'	Report	Havel 71'

San Mamés, Bilbao
Attendance: 45,471
Referee: Matej Jug (Slovenia)

30 January 2025
21:00

Dynamo Kyiv (Ukrainian Association of Football)	1–0	(Latvian Football Federation) RFS
Pikhalyonok 76'	Report

Volksparkstadion, Hamburg, Germany
Attendance: 3,698
Referee: Orel Grinfeld (Israel)

30 January 2025
21:00

Midtjylland (Danish Football Association)	2–2	(Turkish Football Federation) Fenerbahçe
Diao 27'; Byskov 86'	Report	En-Nesyri 39'; Džeko 47'

MCH Arena, Herning
Attendance: 9,693
Referee: Luis Godinho (Portugal)

30 January 2025
21:00

Twente (Royal Dutch Football Association)	1–0	(Turkish Football Federation) Beşiktaş
Rots 76'	Report

De Grolsch Veste, Enschede
Attendance: 28,500
Referee: Szymon Marciniak (Poland)

30 January 2025
21:00

Ferencváros (Hungarian Football Federation)	4–3	(Royal Dutch Football Association) AZ
Ben Romdhane 9', 45'; Traoré 34'; B. Varga 82' (pen.)	Report	Mijnans 76', 90+5'; Parrott 90'

Ferencváros Stadion, Budapest
Attendance: 18,657
Referee: Nenad Minaković (Serbia)

30 January 2025
21:00 (22:00 UTC+2)

FCSB (Romanian Football Federation)	0–2	(The Football Association) Manchester United
	Report	Dalot 60'; Mainoo 68'

Arena Națională, Bucharest
Attendance: 50,128
Referee: Harm Osmers (Germany)

30 January 2025
21:00

Maccabi Tel Aviv (Israel Football Association)	0–1	(Portuguese Football Federation) Porto
	Report	González 58'

Partizan Stadium, Belgrade, Serbia
Attendance: 673
Referee: Nikola Dabanović (Montenegro)

30 January 2025
21:00

Nice (French Football Federation)	1–1	(Norwegian Football Federation) Bodø/Glimt
Bouanani 74'	Report	Bjørkan 54'

Allianz Riviera, Nice
Attendance: 4,294
Referee: Juxhin Xhaja (Albania)

30 January 2025
21:00 (22:00 UTC+2)

Olympiacos (Hellenic Football Federation)	3–0	(Association of Football Federations of Azerbaijan) Qarabağ
El Kaabi 56', 60'; Biancone 89'	Report

Karaiskakis Stadium, Piraeus
Attendance: 31,500
Referee: Radu Petrescu (Romania)

30 January 2025
21:00

Lyon (French Football Federation)	1–1	(Bulgarian Football Union) Ludogorets Razgrad
Tolisso 54'	Report	Almeida 77'

Parc Olympique Lyonnais, Décines-Charpieu
Attendance: 35,448
Referee: Anastasios Sidiropoulos (Greece)

30 January 2025
21:00 (20:00 UTC+0)

Rangers (Scottish Football Association)	2–1	(Royal Belgian Football Association) Union Saint-Gilloise
Raskin 21'; Černý 55'	Report	Mac Allister 83'

Ibrox Stadium, Glasgow
Attendance: 46,993
Referee: Damian Sylwestrzak (Poland)

30 January 2025
21:00

Real Sociedad (Royal Spanish Football Federation)	2–0	(Hellenic Football Federation) PAOK
Óskarsson 43', 48'	Report

Anoeta, San Sebastián
Attendance: 23,872
Referee: John Beaton (Scotland)

30 January 2025
21:00

Anderlecht (Royal Belgian Football Association)	3–4	(German Football Association) TSG Hoffenheim
Vázquez 18'; Goto 79'; Augustinsson 88'	Report	Sardella 41' (o.g.); Bischof 54'; Mokwa 59'; Hložek 65'

Constant Vanden Stock Stadium, Brussels
Attendance: 17,839
Referee: Giorgi Kruashvili (Georgia)

30 January 2025
21:00 (20:00 UTC+0)

Braga (Portuguese Football Federation)	1–0	(Italian Football Federation) Lazio
R. Horta 6'	Report

Estádio Municipal, Braga
Attendance: 10,438
Referee: John Brooks (England)

30 January 2025
21:00

Slavia Prague (Football Association of the Czech Republic)	2–2	(Swedish Football Association) Malmö FF
Chorý 46'; Schranz 76'	Report	Ali 69'; Bolin 71'

Fortuna Arena, Prague
Attendance: 17,026
Referee: Allard Lindhout (Netherlands)

30 January 2025
21:00 (20:00 UTC+0)

Tottenham Hotspur (The Football Association)	3–0	(Swedish Football Association) IF Elfsborg
Scarlett 70'; Ajayi 84'; Moore 90+4'	Report

Tottenham Hotspur Stadium, London
Attendance: 57,337
Referee: Sebastian Gishamer (Austria)
