= 2007–08 Eintracht Frankfurt season =

Eintracht Frankfurt
2007–08 season
- Chairman: Peter Fischer
- Manager: Friedhelm Funkel
- Stadium: Commerzbank-Arena
- Bundesliga: 9th
- DFB-Pokal: Second round
- Top goalscorer: Ioannis Amanatidis (11)
- Average home league attendance: 48,300
Home colours	Away colours

Eintracht Frankfurt started the 2007–08 season competing in the Bundesliga and the DFB-Pokal.

== Players ==
=== First-team squad ===
Squad at end of season

Note: Flags indicate national team as defined under FIFA eligibility rules; some limited exceptions apply. Players may hold more than one non-FIFA nationality.

No.	Pos.	Nation	Player
1	GK	MKD	Oka Nikolov (Note: Nikolov was born in Erbach im Odenwald, West Germany, but also qualified to represent Macedonia (now North Macedonia) internationally and made his international debut for Macedonia in September 1998.)
2	DF	GER	Patrick Ochs
3	DF	MEX	Aarón Galindo
4	DF	GER	Christoph Preuß
5	DF	MKD	Aleksandar Vasoski
6	MF	GER	Michael Fink
7	MF	GER	Benjamin Köhler
8	FW	GRE	Vangelis Mantzios (on loan from Panathinaikos)
9	MF	GER	Marcel Heller
10	MF	AUT	Markus Weissenberger
14	MF	GER	Alexander Meier
15	DF	IRN	Mehdi Mahdavikia
16	DF	SUI	Christoph Spycher
17	FW	CZE	Martin Fenin

No.	Pos.	Nation	Player
18	FW	GRE	Ioannis Amanatidis
20	MF	JPN	Junichi Inamoto
21	GK	GER	Markus Pröll
22	MF	CRO	Krešo Ljubičić (Note: Ljubičić was born in Hanau, West Germany, but also qualified to represent Croatia internationally and represented Croatia at U-17, U-18, U-19, U-20 and U-21 level.)
23	DF	GER	Marco Russ
24	DF	GER	Martin Hess
26	FW	GER	Juvhel Tsoumou (Note: Tsoumou was born in Brazzaville, the Congo, but was raised in Germany from the age of 10 and represented Germany at U-18 and U-19 level before making his international debut for the Congo in September 2017.)
27	DF	GER	Sotirios Kyrgiakos
28	GK	GER	Jan Zimmermann
29	DF	BRA	Chris
30	MF	BRA	Caio
31	DF	GER	Mounir Chaftar
32	MF	GER	Faton Toski (Note: Toski was born in Gjilan, SFR Yugoslavia (now Kosovo), but was raised in Germany and represented Germany at U-19 level before making his international debut for Kosovo in March 2014.)

=== Left club during season ===
Note: Flags indicate national team as defined under FIFA eligibility rules; some limited exceptions apply. Players may hold more than one non-FIFA nationality.

No.	Pos.	Nation	Player
8	MF	GER	Albert Streit (Note: Streit was born in Bucharest, Romania, but was raised in Germany and represented Germany at U-16, U-17, U-18 and B level.) (to Schalke 04)
11	FW	GER	Michael Thurk (to Augsburg)

No.	Pos.	Nation	Player
19	FW	JPN	Naohiro Takahara (to Urawa Red Diamonds)

=== Eintracht Frankfurt II ===
Note: Flags indicate national team as defined under FIFA eligibility rules; some limited exceptions apply. Players may hold more than one non-FIFA nationality.

No.	Pos.	Nation	Player
25	FW	GER	Danny Galm
33	DF	GER	Jürgen Mössmer
34	GK	GER	Pablo Álvarez
35	DF	GER	Norman Theuerkauf
—	GK	GER	Erman Muratagic
—	DF	GER	Timothy Chandler (Note: Chandler was born in Frankfurt, West Germany, but also qualified to represent the United States internationally through his father and made his international debut for the United States in March 2011.)

No.	Pos.	Nation	Player
—	DF	GER	Stefano Cincotta (Note: Cincotta was born in Guatemala City, Guatemala, but was raised in Germany and also qualified to represent Italy internationally through his father, and represented Germany at U-17, U-19 and U-20 level before making his international debut for Guatemala in 2015.)
—	DF	GER	Sebastian Jung
—	MF	GER	Marcel Titsch-Rivero
—	MF	GER	Richard Weil
—	FW	GER	Marcos Álvarez
—	FW	GER	Cenk Tosun (Note: Tosun was born in Wetzlar, Germany, and represented Germany at U-16, U-18, U-19 and U-21 level, but also qualified to represent Turkey internationally and represented Turkey at U-21 and B level before making his international debut for Turkey in October 2013.)

== Transfers ==
In:

Player	From	Fee
(Brazil) Caio	Grêmio Recreativo Barueri	€4,000,000
(Germany) Daniyel Cimen	Eintracht Braunschweig	Was on loan
(Czech Republic) Martin Fenin	FK Teplice	€3,500,000
(Mexico) Aarón Galindo	Grasshopper Club Zürich	Free
(Germany) Danny Galm	VfB Stuttgart II	Free
(Germany) Martin Hess	VfB Stuttgart II	Free
(Japan) Junichi Inamoto	Galatasaray	Free
(Croatia) Krešo Ljubičić	Eintracht Frankfurt academy	Free
(Iran) Mehdi Mahdavikia	Hamburger SV	Free
(Greece) Evangelos Mantzios	Panathinaikos	€300,000 (on loan)

Out:

Player	To	Fee
(Germany) Daniyel Cimen	Kickers Offenbach	Free
(Switzerland) Benjamin Huggel	FC Basel	€400,000
(Germany) Jermaine Jones	FC Schalke 04	Free
(Germany) Christopher Reinhard	Karlsruher SC	Free
(Germany) Marko Rehmer	Retired	Free
(Germany) Albert Streit	FC Schalke 04	€2,500,000
(Japan) Naohiro Takahara	Urawa Red Diamonds	€1,500,000
(Germany) Michael Thurk	FC Augsburg	€300,000

== Results ==
Results for Eintracht Frankfurt for season 2007–08.

NOTE: scores are written Eintracht first

Date	Venue	Opponents	Score	Competition	Eintracht scorers	Match Report
July 7, 2007	Parkstadion, Zell am Ziller	WSG Wattens	1–0	F	Meier	eintracht-archiv.de
July 10, 2007	Sportanlage Bramberg, Bramberg am Wildkogel	Dinamo București	1–3	F	Thurk	eintracht-archiv.de
July 14, 2007	Rheingaustadion, Geisenheim	SV Wehen	0–2	F		eintracht-archiv.de
July 17, 2007	Sportanlage Frankfurter Straße, Ober-Roden	Germania Ober-Roden	6–0	F	Amanatidis, Thurk (2), Meier (2), Fink	eintracht-archiv.de
July 20, 2007	Zoo-Stadion, Wuppertal	Wuppertaler SV Borussia	1–0	F	Amanatidis	eintracht-archiv.de
July 25, 2007	Vivaris Arena Emsland, Meppen	SV Meppen	0–2	F		eintracht-archiv.de
July 28, 2007	Bomag-Stadion, Boppard	TuS Koblenz	3–1	F	Meier, Streit, Ljubičić	eintracht-archiv.de
August 1, 2007	Stadion auf der Bleiche, Dillenburg	Dillenburg XI	10–0	F	Meier (3), Thurk (2), Amanatidis (3), Galm, Chaftar	eintracht-archiv.de
August 5, 2007	Alte Försterei, Berlin	1. FC Union Berlin	4–1	GC	Meier (3), Amanatidis	eintracht-archiv.de
August 7, 2007	Sportpark Kelsterbach, Kelsterbach	Viktoria 07 Kelsterbach	6–1	F	Amanatidis (2), Ochs, Thurk, Weissenberger, Toski	eintracht-archiv.de
August 11, 2007	Commerzbank-Arena, Frankfurt	Hertha BSC Berlin	1–0	BL	Amanatidis	ESPN
August 14, 2007	Stadion an die Schwarzbachstraße, Hausen	FC Teutonia 07 Hausen	15–2	F	Vogel (og), Köhler, Galm, Ljubičić (3), Weissenberger (2), Thurk (4), Hess (3)	eintracht-archiv.de
August 18, 2007	Stadion Alm, Bielefeld	Arminia Bielefeld	2–2	BL	Meier, Russ	ESPN
August 21, 2007	Sportplatz "In der Witz", Mainz-Kastel	FVgg. Kastel 06	10–0	F	Hess, Köhler (3), Weissenberger (3), Bonß (og), Toski, Galm	eintracht-archiv.de
August 26, 2007	Commerzbank-Arena, Frankfurt	FC Hansa Rostock	1–0	BL	Meier	ESPN
August 28, 2007	Bezirkssportanlage an der Hahnstraße, Frankfurt-Niederrad	FC Union Niederrad 07	11–0	F	Toski (2), Fink, Thurk (4), Weissenberger, Hess, Galm (2)	eintracht-archiv.de
September 1, 2007	Weserstadion, Bremen	SV Werder Bremen	1–2	BL	Thurk	ESPN
September 11, 2007	Sportpark, Raunheim	FSV Raunheim 07	23–0	F	Preuß, Thurk (3), Galindo, Galm (8), Weissenberger, Hess (3), Toski, Ljubičić, Chaftar, Meier (3)	eintracht-archiv.de
September 15, 2007	Commerzbank-Arena, Frankfurt	Hamburger SV	2–1	BL	Meier (2)	ESPN
September 21, 2007	Ruhrstadion, Bochum	VfL Bochum	0–0	BL		ESPN
September 26, 2007	Commerzbank-Arena, Frankfurt	Karlsruher SC	0–1	BL		ESPN
September 30, 2007	Stadion der Freundschaft, Cottbus	FC Energie Cottbus	2–2	BL	Amanatidis (2,1 pen)	ESPN
October 7, 2007	Commerzbank-Arena, Frankfurt	Bayer Leverkusen	2–1	BL	Kyrgiakos (2)	ESPN
October 12, 2007	Stadion am Schönbusch, Aschaffenburg	Viktoria Aschaffenburg	5–1	F	Mahdavikia, Chris, Köhler, Toski, Heller	eintracht-archiv.de
October 20, 2007	EasyCredit-Stadion, Nuremberg	1. FC Nürnberg	1–5	BL	Takahara	ESPN
October 26, 2007	Commerzbank-Arena, Frankfurt	Hannover 96	0–0	BL		ESPN
October 31, 2007	Signal Iduna Park, Dortmund	Borussia Dortmund	1–2	GC	Amanatidis	eintracht-archiv.de
November 3, 2007	Allianz Arena, Munich	FC Bayern Munich	0–0	BL		ESPN
November 10, 2007	Signal Iduna Park, Dortmund	Borussia Dortmund	1–1	BL	Amanatidis	ESPN
November 15, 2007	Nidda-Sportfeld, Bad Vilbel	FV Bad Vilbel	8–1	F	Fink, Köhler, Russ, Hess (4), Galm	eintracht-archiv.de
November 24, 2007	Commerzbank-Arena, Frankfurt	VfB Stuttgart	1–4	BL	Köhler	ESPN
December 1, 2007	Volkswagen Arena, Wolfsburg	VfL Wolfsburg	2–2	BL	Chris, Fink	ESPN
December 8, 2007	Commerzbank-Arena, Frankfurt	FC Schalke 04	2–2	BL	Toski, Amanatidis	ESPN
December 16, 2007	MSV Arena, Duisburg	MSV Duisburg	1–0	BL	Amanatidis	ESPN
January 4, 2008	Ballsporthalle, Frankfurt	Kickers Offenbach	2–3	IT	Fenin, Köhler	eintracht-archiv.de
January 4, 2008	Ballsporthalle, Frankfurt	SV Wehen	4–2	IT	Galm, Russ, Toski, Hess	eintracht-archiv.de
January 4, 2008	Ballsporthalle, Frankfurt	FSV Mainz 05	2–0	IT (semi-final match)	Toski, Köhler	eintracht-archiv.de
January 4, 2008	Ballsporthalle, Frankfurt	SV Wehen	3–3 (5–6 PSO)	IT (final match)	Inamoto, Russ, Ochs	eintracht-archiv.de
January 5, 2008	SAP Arena, Mannheim	TSG Hoffenheim	4–4	IT	Galm, Hess, Russ, Fink	eintracht-archiv.de
January 5, 2008	SAP Arena, Mannheim	Kickers Offenbach	0–0	IT		eintracht-archiv.de
January 5, 2008	SAP Arena, Mannheim	Karlsruher SC	3–4	IT (semi-final match)	Köhler (2), Russ	eintracht-archiv.de
January 5, 2008	SAP Arena, Mannheim	SV Waldhof Mannheim	4–0	IT (third place play-off)	Köhler, Russ, Galm, Ochs	eintracht-archiv.de
January 10, 2008	TBA, Portimão	1. FC Nürnberg	1–1	F	Amanatidis	eintracht-archiv.de
January 12, 2008	TBA, Vale do Lobo	VfL Wolfsburg	1–1	F	Amanatidis	eintracht-archiv.de
January 19, 2008	Hermann Löns Stadium, Paderborn	SC Paderborn 07	1–1	F	Fink	eintracht-archiv.de
January 26, 2008	BRITA-Arena, Wiesbaden	SV Wehen	2–0	F	Amanatidis, Caio	eintracht-archiv.de
February 2, 2008	Olympic Stadium, Berlin	Hertha BSC Berlin	3–0	BL	Fenin (3)	ESPN
February 8, 2008	Commerzbank-Arena, Frankfurt	Arminia Bielefeld	2–1	BL	Amanatidis, Fenin	ESPN
February 16, 2008	DKB-Arena, Rostock	FC Hansa Rostock	0–1	BL		ESPN
February 23, 2008	Commerzbank-Arena, Frankfurt	SV Werder Bremen	1–0	BL	Amanatidis	ESPN
March 2, 2008	HSH Nordbank Arena, Hamburg	Hamburger SV	1–4	BL	Kyrgiakos	ESPN
March 8, 2008	Commerzbank-Arena, Frankfurt	VfL Bochum	1–1	BL	Toski	ESPN
March 15, 2008	Wildparkstadion, Karlsruhe	Karlsruher SC	1–0	BL	Fink	ESPN
March 20, 2008	Commerzbank-Arena, Frankfurt	FC Energie Cottbus	2–1	BL	Caio, Russ	ESPN
March 25, 2008	Grotenburg-Stadion, Krefeld	KFC Uerdingen 05	2–1	F	Galm, Weil	eintracht-archiv.de
March 29, 2008	BayArena, Leverkusen	Bayer Leverkusen	2–0	BL	Kießling (og), Mantzios	ESPN
April 5, 2008	Commerzbank-Arena, Frankfurt	1. FC Nürnberg	1–3	BL	Fink	ESPN
April 12, 2008	AWD-Arena, Hanover	Hannover 96	1–2	BL	Russ	ESPN
April 16, 2008	Commerzbank-Arena, Frankfurt	FC Bayern Munich	1–3	BL	Köhler	ESPN
April 22, 2008	Am Sauerborn, Bad Soden	SG Bad Soden / FV Neuenhain XI	21–0	F	Mahdavikia (4), Mantzios (3), Caio (3), Amanatidis (5, 2 pen), Weissenberger, Mössmer, Fink (3)	eintracht-archiv.de
April 25, 2008	Commerzbank-Arena, Frankfurt	Borussia Dortmund	1–1	BL	Köhler	ESPN
May 3, 2008	Gottlieb-Daimler-Stadion, Stuttgart	VfB Stuttgart	1–4	BL	Amanatidis	ESPN
May 7, 2008	Commerzbank-Arena, Frankfurt	VfL Wolfsburg	2–3	BL	Amanatidis (pen), Weissenberger	ESPN
May 10, 2008	Veltins-Arena, Gelsenkirchen	FC Schalke 04	0–1	BL		ESPN
May 17, 2008	Commerzbank-Arena, Frankfurt	MSV Duisburg	4–2	BL	Amanatidis, Fenin (2), Heller	ESPN

Key:

- BL = Bundesliga
- GC = German Cup (DFB-Pokal)
- F = Friendly match
- IT = Indoor tournament

== Sources ==
- Matheja, Ulrich (2011). Unsere Eintracht – Eintracht Frankfurt – Die Chronik. Die Werkstatt. ISBN 978-3-89533-750-5.
- Official English Eintracht website
- Eintracht-Archiv.de
- 2007–08 Eintracht Frankfurt season at Fussballdaten.de (in German)
