= 2025–26 Eintracht Frankfurt season =

Eintracht Frankfurt
2025–26 season
- President: Mathias Beck
- Board members: Markus Krösche; Axel Hellmann; Julien Zamberk; Philipp Reschke
- Head coach: Dino Toppmöller (until 18 January); Dennis Schmitt (interim, until 1 February); Albert Riera (from 2 February)
- Bundesliga: 8th
- DFB-Pokal: Second round
- UEFA Champions League: League phase
- Top goalscorer: League: Jonathan Burkardt (13); All: Jonathan Burkardt (15)
- Highest home attendance: 59,500 (10 matches)
- Lowest home attendance: 58,000 (2 matches)
- Average home league attendance: 59,065
| Home colours | Away colours | Third colours |

The 2025–26 season was the 126th season in the history of Eintracht Frankfurt, a football club based in Frankfurt, Germany. In addition to the domestic league, Eintracht Frankfurt also participated in this season's edition of the DFB-Pokal and the UEFA Champions League. This was the 101st season for Frankfurt in the Deutsche Bank Park, located in Frankfurt, Hesse, Germany. The season covered a period from 1 July 2025 to 30 June 2026.

== Players ==
=== First-team squad ===
As of 6 February 2026

Note: Flags indicate national team as defined under FIFA eligibility rules; some limited exceptions apply. Players may hold more than one non-FIFA nationality.

| No. | Pos. | Nation | Player |
|---|---|---|---|
| 2 | DF | GER | Elias Baum |
| 3 | DF | BEL | Arthur Theate (vice-captain) |
| 4 | DF | GER | Robin Koch (captain) |
| 5 | DF | SUI | Aurèle Amenda |
| 6 | MF | DEN | Oscar Højlund |
| 7 | FW | GER | Ansgar Knauff |
| 8 | MF | ALG | Farès Chaïbi |
| 9 | FW | GER | Jonathan Burkardt |
| 11 | FW | GER | Younes Ebnoutalib |
| 13 | DF | DEN | Rasmus Kristensen |
| 15 | MF | TUN | Ellyes Skhiri |
| 16 | MF | SWE | Hugo Larsson |
| 18 | MF | GER | Mahmoud Dahoud |
| 19 | FW | FRA | Jean-Mattéo Bahoya |
| 20 | FW | JPN | Ritsu Dōan |
| 21 | DF | GER | Nathaniel Brown |
| 22 | DF | USA | Timothy Chandler |

| No. | Pos. | Nation | Player |
|---|---|---|---|
| 23 | GK | GER | Michael Zetterer |
| 25 | FW | FRA | Arnaud Kalimuendo (on loan from Nottingham Forest) |
| 26 | DF | JPN | Keita Kosugi |
| 27 | MF | GER | Mario Götze |
| 29 | FW | MAR | Ayoube Amaimouni-Echghouyab |
| 30 | FW | BEL | Michy Batshuayi |
| 31 | MF | SWE | Love Arrhov |
| 33 | GK | GER | Jens Grahl |
| 34 | DF | GER | Nnamdi Collins |
| 38 | MF | GER | Eba Bekir İş |
| 39 | GK | BIH | Amil Šiljević |
| 40 | GK | BRA | Kauã Santos |
| 41 | DF | MLI | Fousseny Doumbia |
| 42 | FW | TUR | Can Uzun |
| 43 | GK | GER | Yurij Obert |
| 45 | MF | USA | Marvin Dills |
| 53 | FW | GER | Alexander Staff |

=== Players out on loan ===
Note: Flags indicate national team as defined under FIFA eligibility rules; some limited exceptions apply. Players may hold more than one non-FIFA nationality.

| No. | Pos. | Nation | Player |
|---|---|---|---|
| — | GK | ALB | Simon Simoni (at 1. FC Kaiserslautern until 30 June 2026) |
| — | DF | FRA | Niels Nkounkou (at Torino until 30 June 2026) |
| — | DF | CRO | Hrvoje Smolčić (at Kocaelispor until 30 June 2026) |
| — | MF | CMR | Éric Junior Dina Ebimbe (at Brest until 30 June 2026) |

| No. | Pos. | Nation | Player |
|---|---|---|---|
| — | MF | HUN | Noah Fenyő (at Újpest until 30 June 2026) |
| — | MF | HUN | Krisztián Lisztes (at Ferencváros until 30 June 2026) |
| — | FW | GER | Jessic Ngankam (at Wolfsberger AC until 30 June 2026) |
| — | FW | CIV | Elye Wahi (at Nice until 30 June 2026) |

== Transfers ==
=== In ===
| No. | Pos. | Player | Transferred from | Fee | Date | Source |
|---|---|---|---|---|---|---|
| 13 | DF | (Denmark) Rasmus Kristensen | (England) Leeds United | €6M | 1 June 2025 | |
| 31 | MF | (United States) Paxten Aaronson | (Netherlands) Utrecht | Loan return | 1 July 2025 | |
| 2 | DF | (Germany) Elias Baum | (Germany) SV Elversberg | Loan return | 1 July 2025 | |
| 36 | DF | (Portugal) Aurélio Buta | (France) Reims | Loan return | 1 July 2025 | |
| 45 | MF | (Germany) Marvin Dills | (Germany) Eintracht Frankfurt academy | Free | 1 July 2025 | |
| | FW | (Spain) Nacho Ferri | (Belgium) KV Kortrijk | Loan return | 1 July 2025 | |
| 37 | MF | (Germany) Jeremiaha Maluze | (Germany) Rot-Weiß Erfurt | Undisclosed | 1 July 2025 | |
| 32 | FW | (Germany) Jessic Ngankam | (Germany) Hannover 96 | Loan return | 1 July 2025 | |
| 35 | DF | (Croatia) Hrvoje Smolčić | (Austria) LASK | Loan return | 1 July 2025 | |
| 49 | DF | (Spain) Derek Boakye Osei | (Germany) Eintracht Frankfurt academy | Free | 3 July 2025 | |
| 41 | DF | (Mali) Fousseny Doumbia | (Germany) Eintracht Frankfurt academy | Free | 3 July 2025 | |
| 50 | FW | (Germany) Alessandro Gaul Souza | (Germany) Eintracht Frankfurt academy | Free | 3 July 2025 | |
| 9 | FW | (Germany) Jonathan Burkardt | (Germany) Mainz 05 | €21M | 4 July 2025 | |
| 39 | GK | (Germany) Amil Šiljević | (Germany) Eintracht Frankfurt academy | Free | 10 July 2025 | |
| 20 | MF | (Japan) Ritsu Dōan | (Germany) SC Freiburg | €21M | 7 August 2025 | |
| 23 | GK | (Germany) Michael Zetterer | (Germany) Werder Bremen | €5M | 20 August 2025 | |
| 31 | MF | (Sweden) Love Arrhov | (Sweden) Brommapojkarna | €4.6M | 1 January 2026 | |
| 26 | DF | (Japan) Keita Kosugi | (Sweden) Djurgårdens IF | €4.5M | 1 January 2026 | |
| 11 | FW | (Germany) Younes Ebnoutalib | (Germany) SV Elversberg | €8.0M | 1 January 2026 | |
| 25 | FW | (Morocco) Ayoube Amaimouni | (Germany) TSG Hoffenheim II | €0.2M | 2 January 2026 | |
| 29 | FW | (France) Arnaud Kalimuendo | (England) Nottingham Forest | Loan €1.5M | 7 January 2026 | |

=== Out ===
| No. | Pos. | Player | Transferred to | Fee | Date | Source |
|---|---|---|---|---|---|---|
| | GK | (Sweden) Nils Ramming | (England) Brighton & Hove Albion | €850,000 | 1 July 2025 | |
| 28 | MF | (Germany) Marcel Wenig | (Germany) SSV Ulm | Free transfer | 1 July 2025 | |
| 49 | MF | (Germany) Harpreet Ghotra | Free agent | Free transfer | 1 July 2025 | |
| | FW | (Morocco) Anas Alaoui | (Italy) Lecco | Free transfer | 1 July 2025 | |
| | FW | (Spain) Nacho Ferri | (Belgium) KVC Westerlo | €2M | 8 July 2025 | |
| | FW | (Croatia) Igor Matanović | (Germany) SC Freiburg | €6.7M | 9 July 2025 | |
| 11 | FW | (France) Hugo Ekitike | (England) Liverpool | €95M | 23 July 2025 | |
| 35 | DF | (Brazil) Tuta | (Qatar) Al-Duhail | €15M | 4 August 2025 | |
| 23 | MF | (Hungary) Krisztián Lisztes | (Hungary) Ferencváros | Loan | 8 August 2025 | |
| 1 | GK | (Germany) Kevin Trapp | (France) Paris FC | €1M | 19 August 2025 | |
| 31 | MF | (United States) Paxten Aaronson | (United States) Colorado Rapids | €7M | 21 August 2025 | |
| 26 | MF | (France) Éric Junior Dina Ebimbe | (France) Brest | Loan | 1 September 2025 | |
| 29 | DF | (France) Niels Nkounkou | (Italy) Torino | Loan | 1 September 2025 | |
| 35 | DF | (Croatia) Hrvoje Smolčić | (Turkey) Kocaelispor | Loan | 6 September 2025 | |
| 17 | FW | (Ivory Coast) Elye Wahi | (France) Nice | Loan | 1 January 2026 | |
| 47 | MF | (Hungary) Noah Fenyő | (Hungary) Újpest | Loan | 21 January 2026 | |
| 36 | DF | (Portugal) Aurélio Buta | (Denmark) Copenhagen | Undisclosed | 30 January 2026 | |
| 32 | FW | (Portugal) Jessic Ngankam | (Austria) Wolfsberger AC | Loan | 6 February 2026 | |

== Friendly matches ==
Win Draw Loss

| 19 July 2025 | FSV Frankfurt (Germany) | 2–3 | (Germany) Eintracht Frankfurt | Frankfurt, Germany |
| 18:00 CEST (UTC+2) | Harnafi 35'; Farouk 57' | Report | Buta 2'; Gottwalt 27' (o.g.); Uzun 47' | Stadium: Stadion am Bornheimer Hang; Attendance: 10,642 |

| 26 July 2025 | Eintracht Frankfurt (Germany) | 2–2 | (England) Aston Villa | Louisville, United States |
| 19:00 EDT (UTC−4) | Wahi 20'; Is 82' | Report | Watkins 11'; Rogers 47' | Stadium: Lynn Family Stadium; Attendance: 11,239 |

| 29 July 2025 | Louisville City (United States) | 2–5 | (Germany) Eintracht Frankfurt | Louisville, United States |
| 19:30 EDT (UTC−4) | Lambert 59'; Wilson 65' | Report | Baum 36'; Burkardt 67'; Dills 71'; Nkounkou 74', 89' | Stadium: Lynn Family Stadium; Attendance: 8,000 |

| 2 August 2025 | Philadelphia Union (United States) | 2–2 | (Germany) Eintracht Frankfurt | Chester, United States |
| 17:30 EDT (UTC−4) | Damiani 41'; Donovan 72' | Report | Burkardt 3'; Wahi 60' | Stadium: Subaru Park; Attendance: 16,218 |

| 9 August 2025 | Fulham (England) | 1–3 | (Germany) Eintracht Frankfurt | London, England |
| 17:00 BST (UTC+1) | Goal | Report | Wahi; Dōan | Stadium: Unknown location Attendance: 0 |
Note: The match was played behind closed doors on Fulham's request.

| 9 August 2025 | Fulham (England) | 1–0 | (Germany) Eintracht Frankfurt | London, England |
| 17:00 BST (UTC+1) | Jiménez 35' | Report | | Stadium: Craven Cottage |

| 19 May 2026 | Rot-Weiss Frankfurt (Germany) | 0–7 | (Germany) Eintracht Frankfurt | Frankfurt, Germany |
| 18:30 CEST (UTC+2) | | Report | Ebnoutalib 16'; Kumashiro 55', 68'; Sonnenwald 57', 71', 82'; Wünsch 79' | Stadium: Stadion am Brentanobad; Attendance: 2,284 |

| 20 May 2026 | SV Sandhausen (Germany) | 3–3 | (Germany) Eintracht Frankfurt | Sandhausen, Germany |
| | Outman 6'; Schulz 46'; Ramšak 84' | Report | Maluze 17'; Knauff 78', 79' | Stadium: Hardtwaldstadion; Attendance: 3,000 |

== Competitions ==
Win Draw Loss

=== Overall record ===
| Competition | First match | Last match | Starting round | Final position | Record | | | | | | | |
| Competition | First match | Last match | Starting round | Final position | Pld | W | D | L | GF | GA | GD | Win % |
|---|---|---|---|---|---|---|---|---|---|---|---|---|
| Bundesliga | 23 August 2025 | 16 May 2026 | Matchday 1 | 8th | 34 | 11 | 11 | 12 | 61 | 65 | −4 | 32.35 |
| DFB-Pokal | 17 August 2025 | 28 October 2025 | First round | Second round | 2 | 1 | 1 | 0 | 6 | 1 | +5 | 50.00 |
| UEFA Champions League | 18 September 2025 | 28 January 2026 | League phase | League phase | 8 | 1 | 1 | 6 | 10 | 21 | −11 | 12.50 |
| Total | | | | | 44 | 13 | 13 | 18 | 77 | 87 | −10 | 29.55 |

Source: Soccerway

=== Bundesliga ===
==== League table ====
| Pos | Team | Pld | W | D | L | GF | GA | GD | Pts | Qualification or relegation |
|---|---|---|---|---|---|---|---|---|---|---|
| 6 | Bayer Leverkusen | 34 | 17 | 8 | 9 | 68 | 47 | +21 | 59 | Qualification for the Europa League league phase (Note: The 2025–26 DFB-Pokal winners qualified for the Europa League league phase. Since the DFB-Pokal winners, Bayern Munich, qualified for the Champions League, the Europa League spot passed to the sixth-placed team, and the Conference League spot passed to the seventh-placed team.) |
| 7 | SC Freiburg | 34 | 13 | 8 | 13 | 51 | 57 | −6 | 47 | Qualification for the Conference League play-off round |
| 8 | Eintracht Frankfurt | 34 | 11 | 11 | 12 | 61 | 65 | −4 | 44 | |
| 9 | FC Augsburg | 34 | 12 | 7 | 15 | 45 | 61 | −16 | 43 | |
| 10 | Mainz 05 | 34 | 10 | 10 | 14 | 44 | 53 | −9 | 40 | |

Source: Bundesliga
Rules for classification: 1) Points; 2) Goal difference; 3) Goals scored; 4) Head-to-head results; 5) Head-to-head away goals scored; 6) Away goals scored; 7) Play-off.
(Rules 4–6 only apply after home and away matches have been played between the tied teams.)

==== Results summary ====
| Overall | | | | | | | | Home | | | | | | Away | | | | | |
| Pld | W | D | L | GF | GA | GD | Pts | W | D | L | GF | GA | GD | W | D | L | GF | GA | GD |
|---|---|---|---|---|---|---|---|---|---|---|---|---|---|---|---|---|---|---|---|
| 34 | 11 | 11 | 12 | 61 | 65 | −4 | 44 | 7 | 4 | 6 | 29 | 27 | +2 | 4 | 7 | 6 | 32 | 38 | −6 |

Source: Bundesliga

==== Results by round ====
| Round | 1 | 2 | 3 | 4 | 5 | 6 | 7 | 8 | 9 | 10 | 11 | 12 | 13 | 14 | 15 | 16 | 17 | 18 | 19 | 20 | 21 | 22 | 23 | 24 | 25 | 26 | 27 | 28 | 29 | 30 | 31 | 32 | 33 | 34 |
|---|---|---|---|---|---|---|---|---|---|---|---|---|---|---|---|---|---|---|---|---|---|---|---|---|---|---|---|---|---|---|---|---|---|---|
| Ground | H | A | A | H | A | H | A | H | A | H | A | H | A | H | A | H | A | A | H | H | A | H | A | H | A | H | A | H | A | H | A | H | A | H |
| Result | W | W | L | L | W | L | D | W | D | W | W | D | L | W | D | D | L | D | L | L | D | W | L | W | D | W | L | D | W | L | D | L | L | D |
| Position | 2 | 2 | 5 | 6 | 4 | 7 | 7 | 6 | 8 | 7 | 6 | 7 | 7 | 7 | 7 | 7 | 7 | 7 | 8 | 8 | 8 | 7 | 8 | 7 | 7 | 7 | 7 | 7 | 7 | 8 | 7 | 8 | 8 | 8 |

Source: DFB
A = Away; H = Home; W = Win; D = Draw; L = Loss

==== Matches ====
| 23 August 2025 1 | Eintracht Frankfurt | 4–1 | Werder Bremen | Frankfurt |
| 15:30 CEST (UTC+2) | Kristensen (yellow card) 12'; Uzun 22'; Bahoya 25', 47'; Knauff 70' | Report | Malatini (yellow card) 35'; Njinmah 48', (yellow card) 58'; Stark (yellow card) 58' | Stadium: Deutsche Bank Park; Attendance: 59,500; Referee: Harm Osmers |

| 30 August 2025 2 | TSG Hoffenheim | 1–3 | Eintracht Frankfurt | Sinsheim |
| 15:30 CEST (UTC+2) | Tohumcu (yellow card) 57'; Prömel 90+1' | Report | Dōan 17', 27'; Chaïbi (yellow card) 45'; Uzun 51'; Buta (yellow card) 84' | Stadium: Rhein-Neckar-Arena; Attendance: 30,150; Referee: Timo Gerach |

| 12 September 2025 3 | Bayer Leverkusen | 3–1 | Eintracht Frankfurt | Leverkusen |
| 20:30 CEST (UTC+2) | Grimaldo 10', 90+8'; Andrich (yellow card) 19' (yellow-red card) 59'; Schick 45+4' (pen.); Fernández (yellow card) 78' (yellow-red card) 90+2'; Vázquez (yellow card) 90+4' | Report | Uzun 52', (yellow card) 79'; Wahi (yellow card) 90+4'; Theate (yellow card) 90+7' | Stadium: BayArena; Attendance: 30,210; Referee: Deniz Aytekin |

| 21 September 2025 4 | Eintracht Frankfurt | 3–4 | Union Berlin | Frankfurt |
| 15:30 CEST (UTC+2) | Brown 45+4'; Dōan (yellow card) 63'; Uzun 80'; Burkardt 87' (pen.); Collins (yellow card) 88'; Theate (yellow card) 90+6' | Report | Ansah 9'; Burke 32', 53', 56'; Querfeld (yellow card) 86'; Ilić (yellow card) 90+7' | Stadium: Deutsche Bank Park; Attendance: 59,500; Referee: Sven Jablonski |

| 27 September 2025 5 | Borussia Mönchengladbach | 4–6 | Eintracht Frankfurt | Mönchengladbach |
| 18:30 CEST (UTC+2) | Castrop 72'; Tabaković 78'; Engelhardt 83'; Diks (yellow card) 90+5'; Ranos 90+9' | Report | Koch 11', 47'; Knauff 15', (yellow card) 90+5'; Burkardt 35'; Chaïbi 39'; Uzun 45+1'; Amenda (yellow card) 90+1' | Stadium: Borussia-Park; Attendance: 54,042; Referee: Florian Exner |

| 4 October 2025 6 | Eintracht Frankfurt | 0–3 | Bayern Munich | Frankfurt |
| 18:30 CEST (UTC+2) | Burkardt (yellow card) 79' | Report | Díaz 1', 84', (yellow card) 69'; Neuer (yellow card) 15'; Kane 27' | Stadium: Deutsche Bank Park; Attendance: 59,500; Referee: Daniel Siebert |

| 19 October 2025 7 | SC Freiburg | 2–2 | Eintracht Frankfurt | Freiburg |
| 15:30 CEST (UTC+2) | Scherhant 2'; Lienhart (yellow card) 33'; Manzambi (yellow card) 63'; Grifo 87' | Report | Burkardt 18', 38'; Amenda (yellow card) 45+1'; Kristensen (yellow card) 61'; Uzun (yellow card) 64' | Stadium: Europa-Park Stadion; Attendance: 34,700; Referee: Deniz Aytekin |

| 25 October 2025 8 | Eintracht Frankfurt | 2–0 | FC St. Pauli | Frankfurt |
| 15:30 CEST (UTC+2) | Burkardt 36', 56' | Report | Pereira Lage (yellow card) 38' | Stadium: Deutsche Bank Park; Attendance: 59,500; Referee: Robin Braun |

| 1 November 2025 9 | 1. FC Heidenheim | 1–1 | Eintracht Frankfurt | Heidenheim |
| 15:30 CET (UTC+1) | Zivzivadze 32' | Report | Theate (yellow card) 29'; Kristensen 55'; Knauff (yellow card) 70' | Stadium: Voith-Arena; Attendance: 15,000; Referee: Christian Dingert |

| 9 November 2025 10 | Eintracht Frankfurt | 1–0 | Mainz 05 | Frankfurt |
| 19:30 CET (UTC+1) | Dōan 80' | Report | Widmer (yellow card) 45+1'; Da Costa (yellow card) 67'; Mwene (yellow card) 68'; Nebel (yellow card) 90+3'; Zentner (yellow card) 90+6' | Stadium: Deutsche Bank Park; Attendance: 59,000; Referee: Matthias Jöllenbeck |

| 22 November 2025 11 | 1. FC Köln | 3–4 | Eintracht Frankfurt | Cologne |
| 18:30 CET (UTC+1) | Kaminski 6'; Bülter 83'; Waldschmidt 90+4' | Report | Theate 39'; Dahoud 45+6'; Burkardt 60', 63' | Stadium: RheinEnergieStadion; Attendance: 50,000; Referee: Florian Badstübner |

| 30 November 2025 12 | Eintracht Frankfurt | 1–1 | VfL Wolfsburg | Frankfurt |
| 17:30 CET (UTC+1) | Brown (yellow card) 56'; Batshuayi 90+6' (pen.) | Report | Zehnter 67'; Wimmer (yellow card) 70'; Vavro (yellow card) 90+4'; Koulierakis (yellow card) 90+5'; Arnold (yellow card) 90+5' | Stadium: Deutsche Bank Park; Attendance: 58,000; Referee: Harm Osmers |

| 6 December 2025 13 | RB Leipzig | 6–0 | Eintracht Frankfurt | Leipzig |
| 18:30 CET (UTC+1) | Harder 5'; Baumgartner 31'; Diomande 47', 55', 65'; Raum (yellow card) 53', (goal) 62' (pen.) | Report | Theate (yellow card) 68'; Collins (yellow card) 85' | Stadium: Red Bull Arena; Attendance: 47,012; Referee: Daniel Siebert |

| 13 December 2025 14 | Eintracht Frankfurt | 1–0 | FC Augsburg | Frankfurt |
| 15:30 CET (UTC+1) | Dōan 68'; Højlund (yellow card) 75'; Theate (yellow card) 90+5' | Report | Claude-Maurice (yellow card) 41'; Matsima (yellow card) 56'; Zesiger (yellow card) 90+3' | Stadium: Deutsche Bank Park; Attendance: 58,600; Referee: Frank Willenborg |

| 20 December 2025 15 | Hamburger SV | 1–1 | Eintracht Frankfurt | Hamburg |
| 15:30 CET (UTC+1) | Sambi Lokonga 19' | Report | Larsson 26' | Stadium: Volksparkstadion; Attendance: 57,000; Referee: Tobias Stieler |

| 9 January 2026 16 | Eintracht Frankfurt | 3–3 | Borussia Dortmund | Frankfurt |
| 20:30 CET (UTC+1) | Uzun 22' (pen.); Theate (yellow card) 43'; Brown (yellow card) 67'; Ebnoutalib 71'; Kalimuendo (yellow card) 82'; Dahoud 90+2' | Report | Beier 10'; Anton (yellow card) 29'; Süle (yellow card) 41'; Nmecha 68'; Can (yellow card) 87'; Chukwuemeka 90+6' | Stadium: Deutsche Bank Park; Attendance: 59,500; Referee: Daniel Schlager |

| 13 January 2026 17 | VfB Stuttgart | 3–2 | Eintracht Frankfurt | Stuttgart |
| 18:30 CET (UTC+1) | Demirović 27'; Undav 35'; Chabot (yellow card) 56'; Nartey 87'; Hendriks (yellow card) 90+4' | Report | Kristensen 5'; Kalimuendo (yellow card) 9'; Amaimouni 80'; Theate (yellow card) 90+6' | Stadium: MHPArena; Attendance: 59,500; Referee: Matthias Jöllenbeck |

| 16 January 2026 18 | Werder Bremen | 3–3 | Eintracht Frankfurt | Bremen |
| 20:30 CET (UTC+1) | Njinmah 29'; Schmid (yellow card) 52'; Stage 78'; Milošević 80' | Report | Kalimuendo 1'; Collins 56'; Theate (yellow card) 66'; Dōan (yellow card) 78'; Amaimouni (yellow card) 85'; Knauff 90+5'; Brown (yellow card) 90+6' | Stadium: Weserstadion; Attendance: 41,800; Referee: Benjamin Brand |

| 24 January 2026 19 | Eintracht Frankfurt | 1–3 | TSG Hoffenheim | Frankfurt |
| 15:30 CET (UTC+1) | Kalimuendo 18' | Report | Coufal (yellow card) 45'; Hajdari (yellow card) 45+2'; Moerstedt 52'; Kabak 60'; Amenda 65' (o.g.); Avdullahu (yellow card) 90'; Bebou (yellow card) 90+5' | Stadium: Deutsche Bank Park; Attendance: 58,500; Referee: Sven Jablonski |

| 31 January 2026 20 | Eintracht Frankfurt | 1–3 | Bayer Leverkusen | Frankfurt |
| 15:30 CET (UTC+1) | Koch 50'; Kristensen (yellow card) 54'; Skhiri (yellow card) 69' (yellow-red card) 71' | Report | Arthur 26'; Tillman 33'; Grimaldo (yellow card) 63'; García 90+3' | Stadium: Deutsche Bank Park; Attendance: 59,000; Referee: Robert Schröder |

| 6 February 2026 21 | Union Berlin | 1–1 | Eintracht Frankfurt | Berlin |
| 20:30 CET (UTC+1) | Schäfer (yellow card) 68'; Kemlein (yellow card) 72'; Köhn (yellow card) 73'; Querfeld 87' (pen.); Haberer (yellow card) 89' | Report | Kalimuendo (yellow card) 25'; Højlund (yellow card) 36' (yellow-red card) 86'; Brown 84' | Stadium: Stadion An der Alten Försterei; Attendance: 22,012; Referee: Sören Storks |

| 14 February 2026 22 | Eintracht Frankfurt | 3–0 | Borussia Mönchengladbach | Frankfurt |
| 15:30 CET (UTC+1) | Brown 24'; Amaimouni 34'; Götze (yellow card) 54'; Knauff 75'; Koch (yellow card) 78'; Arrhov (yellow card) 87' | Report | Reitz (yellow card) 84'; Engelhardt (yellow card) 89' | Stadium: Deutsche Bank Park; Attendance: 59,500; Referee: Martin Petersen |

| 21 February 2026 23 | Bayern Munich | 3–2 | Eintracht Frankfurt | Munich |
| 15:30 CET (UTC+1) | Pavlović 16'; Kane 20', 68' | Report | Bahoya (yellow card) 43'; Burkardt 77' (pen.); Kalimuendo 86'; Collins (yellow card) 90+2'; Amenda (yellow card) 90+8' | Stadium: Allianz Arena; Attendance: 75,000; Referee: Tobias Reichel |

| 1 March 2026 24 | Eintracht Frankfurt | 2–0 | SC Freiburg | Frankfurt |
| 17:30 CET (UTC+1) | Chaïbi 64'; Bahoya 81'; Collins (yellow card) 86' | Report | Höler (yellow card) 66'; Irié (yellow card) 87' | Stadium: Deutsche Bank Park; Attendance: 59,500; Referee: Christian Dingert |

| 8 March 2026 25 | FC St. Pauli | 0–0 | Eintracht Frankfurt | Hamburg |
| 15:30 CET (UTC+1) | Ando (yellow card) 62'; Metcalfe (yellow card) 89' | Report | Dōan (yellow card) 76' | Stadium: Millerntor-Stadion; Attendance: 29,546; Referee: Felix Zwayer |

| 14 March 2026 26 | Eintracht Frankfurt | 1–0 | 1. FC Heidenheim | Frankfurt |
| 15:30 CET (UTC+1) | Koch (yellow card) 38' (yellow-red card) 73'; Kalimuendo 53'; Zetterer (yellow card) 82' | Report | Dorsch (yellow card) 57'; Dinkçi (yellow card) 71' | Stadium: Deutsche Bank Park; Attendance: 58,700; Referee: Harm Osmers |

| 22 March 2026 27 | Mainz 05 | 2–1 | Eintracht Frankfurt | Mainz |
| 15:30 CET (UTC+1) | Tietz (yellow card) 1'; Nebel 6', 89'; Mwene (yellow card) 45' | Report | Brown 20'; Dōan (yellow card) 27' | Stadium: Mewa Arena; Attendance: 34,034; Referee: Tobias Stieler |

| 5 April 2026 28 | Eintracht Frankfurt | 2–2 | 1. FC Köln | Frankfurt |
| 17:30 CEST (UTC+2) | Knauff (yellow card) 22'; Burkardt 66'; Kalimuendo 69' | Report | Kamiński 70', (yellow card) 90+6'; Castro-Montes 83'; Waldschmidt (yellow card) 90' | Stadium: Deutsche Bank Park; Attendance: 59,300; Referee: Florian Exner |

| 11 April 2026 29 | VfL Wolfsburg | 1–2 | Eintracht Frankfurt | Wolfsburg |
| 15:30 CEST (UTC+2) | Belocian (yellow card) 31'; Vinícius (yellow card) 59'; Pejčinović 90+7' | Report | Højlund 21'; Kalimuendo 32'; Amenda (yellow card) 67' | Stadium: Volkswagen Arena; Attendance: 26,132; Referee: Timo Gerach |

| 18 April 2026 30 | Eintracht Frankfurt | 1–3 | RB Leipzig | Frankfurt |
| 18:30 CEST (UTC+2) | Larsson 35' | Report | Diomande 27'; Finkgräfe (yellow card) 40'; Nusa 70'; Harder 81' | Stadium: Deutsche Bank Park; Attendance: 58,500; Referee: Bastian Dankert |

| 25 April 2026 31 | FC Augsburg | 1–1 | Eintracht Frankfurt | Augsburg |
| 15:30 CEST (UTC+2) | Kade 45'; Massengo (yellow card) 70' | Report | Skhiri (yellow card) 7'; Dōan (yellow card) 46', (goal) 66' | Stadium: Augsburg Arena; Attendance: 30,660; Referee: Harm Osmers |

| 2 May 2026 32 | Eintracht Frankfurt | 1–2 | Hamburger SV | Frankfurt |
| 15:30 CEST (UTC+2) | Uzun 48'; Højlund (yellow card) 52'; Kalimuendo (yellow card) 85'; Uzun (yellow card) 88'; Bahoya (yellow card) 90+10'; Kristensen (yellow card) 71' (yellow-red card) 90+12' | Report | Grønbæk 51'; Vieira 59'; Capaldo (yellow card) 88' | Stadium: Deutsche Bank Park; Attendance: 59,400; Referee: Deniz Aytekin |

| 8 May 2026 33 | Borussia Dortmund | 3–2 | Eintracht Frankfurt | Dortmund |
| 20:30 CEST (UTC+2) | Reggiani (yellow card) 21'; Guirassy 42'; Schlotterbeck 45+1'; Inacio 72', (yellow card) 90+1'; Kobel (yellow card) 90+4' | Report | Uzun 2'; Burkardt 87' | Stadium: Westfalenstadion; Attendance: 81,365; Referee: Patrick Ittrich |

| 16 May 2026 34 | Eintracht Frankfurt | 2–2 | VfB Stuttgart | Frankfurt |
| 15:30 CEST (UTC+2) | Chaïbi (yellow card) 47'; Amenda (yellow card) 60'; Burkardt 72' (pen.), 90+2' (pen.) | Report | Andrés 10', (yellow card) 27'; Nartey 45+4'; Mittelstädt (yellow card) 63'; Demirović (yellow card) 66' | Stadium: Deutsche Bank Park; Attendance: 59,400; Referee: Tobias Welz |

=== DFB-Pokal ===
| 17 August 2025 First round | FV Engers | 0–5 | Eintracht Frankfurt | Koblenz |
| 13:00 CEST (UTC+2) | Naric (yellow card) 25'; Semchuk (yellow card) 28'; Arbursu (yellow card) 77' | Report | Kristensen (yellow card) 23'; Bahoya 44'; Dōan 45', 54'; Collins (yellow card) 70'; Batshuayi (yellow card) 81'; Wahi 89'; Aaronson 90+1' | Stadium: Stadion Oberwerth; Attendance: 10,100; Referee: Robert Kampka |

| 28 October 2025 Second round | Eintracht Frankfurt | 1–1 (a.e.t.) (2–4 p) | Borussia Dortmund | Frankfurt |
| 18:30 CET (UTC+1) | Knauff 7'; Chaïbi (yellow card) 98' | Report | Anselmino (yellow card) 42'; Brandt 48'; Süle (yellow card) 59'; Silva (yellow card) 114' | Stadium: Deutsche Bank Park; Attendance: 59,300; Referee: Sven Jablonski |
| | Penalties |
| | Uzun (penalty scored); Dōan (penalty missed); Batshuayi (penalty scored); Chaïbi (penalty missed) | | (penalty scored) Silva; (penalty scored) Süle; (penalty scored) Chukwuemeka; (penalty scored) Nmecha |

=== UEFA Champions League ===
==== League phase ====
The draw for the league phase was held on 28 August 2025.

| Pos | Team | Pld | W | D | L | GF | GA | GD | Pts |
|---|---|---|---|---|---|---|---|---|---|
| 31 | (Danish Football Association) Copenhagen | 8 | 2 | 2 | 4 | 12 | 21 | −9 | 8 |
| 32 | (Royal Dutch Football Association) Ajax | 8 | 2 | 0 | 6 | 8 | 21 | −13 | 6 |
| 33 | (German Football Association) Eintracht Frankfurt | 8 | 1 | 1 | 6 | 10 | 21 | −11 | 4 |
| 34 | (Football Association of the Czech Republic) Slavia Prague | 8 | 0 | 3 | 5 | 5 | 19 | −14 | 3 |
| 35 | (Royal Spanish Football Federation) Villarreal | 8 | 0 | 1 | 7 | 5 | 18 | −13 | 1 |

Source: UEFA
Rules for classification: League phase tiebreakers

| Round | 1 | 2 | 3 | 4 | 5 | 6 | 7 | 8 |
|---|---|---|---|---|---|---|---|---|
| Ground | H | A | H | A | H | A | A | H |
| Result | W | L | L | D | L | L | L | L |
| Position | 1 | 15 | 22 | 23 | 28 | 30 | 33 | 33 |

Source: UEFA
A = Away; H = Home; W = Win; D = Draw; L = Loss

| 18 September 2025 1 | Eintracht Frankfurt (Germany) | 5–1 | (Turkey) Galatasaray | Frankfurt, Germany |
| 21:00 CEST (UTC+2) | Burkardt (yellow card) 5', (goal) 66'; Sánchez 37' (o.g.); Uzun 45+2'; Singo 45+4' (o.g.); Knauff 75' | Report | Akgün 8'; Buruk (yellow card) 49' | Stadium: Deutsche Bank Park; Attendance: 58,700; Referee: Marco Guida (Italy) |

| 30 September 2025 2 | Atlético Madrid (Spain) | 5–1 | (Germany) Eintracht Frankfurt | Madrid, Spain |
| 21:00 CEST (UTC+2) | Raspadori 4'; Lenglet (yellow card) 13'; Le Normand 33'; Griezmann 45+1'; Simeone 70'; Alvarez 82' (pen.) | Report | Brown (yellow card) 41'; Burkardt 57' | Stadium: Metropolitano Stadium; Attendance: 59,401; Referee: Slavko Vinčić (Slovenia) |

| 22 October 2025 3 | Eintracht Frankfurt (Germany) | 1–5 | (England) Liverpool | Frankfurt, Germany |
| 21:00 CEST (UTC+2) | Kristensen 26'; Dōan (yellow card) 52'; Amenda (yellow card) 54' | Report | Ekitike 35'; Van Dijk 39'; Konaté 44'; Gakpo 66'; Szoboszlai 70' | Stadium: Deutsche Bank Park; Attendance: 58,700; Referee: François Letexier (France) |

| 4 November 2025 4 | Napoli (Italy) | 0–0 | (Germany) Eintracht Frankfurt | Naples, Italy |
| 18:45 CET (UTC+1) | Rrahmani (yellow card) 50'; Gutiérrez (yellow card) 90+6' | Report | Zetterer (yellow card) 89' | Stadium: Stadio Diego Armando Maradona; Attendance: 45,840; Referee: João Pinheiro (Portugal) |

| 26 November 2025 5 | Eintracht Frankfurt (Germany) | 0–3 | (Italy) Atalanta | Frankfurt, Germany |
| 21:00 CET (UTC+1) | | Report | Lookman 60'; Éderson 62'; De Ketelaere 65' | Stadium: Deutsche Bank Park; Attendance: 59,500; Referee: Chris Kavanagh (England) |

| 9 December 2025 6 | Barcelona (Spain) | 2–1 | (Germany) Eintracht Frankfurt | Barcelona, Spain |
| 21:00 CET (UTC+1) | Koundé 50', 53'; Yamal (yellow card) 56'; Martín (yellow card) 61' | Report | Knauff 21', (yellow card) 28' | Stadium: Camp Nou; Attendance: 38,439; Referee: Davide Massa (Italy) |

| 21 January 2026 7 | Qarabağ (Azerbaijan) | 3–2 | (Germany) Eintracht Frankfurt | Baku, Azerbaijan |
| 21:45 AZT (UTC+4) | Durán 4', 80', (yellow card) 83'; Mustafazade 90+4' | Report | Uzun 10'; Kristensen (yellow card) 61'; Chaïbi 78' (pen.); Staff (yellow card) 89' | Stadium: Tofiq Bahramov Republican Stadium; Attendance: 27,820; Referee: Sandro Schärer (Switzerland) |

| 28 January 2026 8 | Eintracht Frankfurt (Germany) | 0–2 | (England) Tottenham Hotspur | Frankfurt, Germany |
| 21:00 CET (UTC+1) | | Report | Kolo Muani 47'; Vicario (yellow card) 75'; Solanke 77'; Palhinha (yellow card) 90+2' | Stadium: Deutsche Bank Park; Attendance: 58,000; Referee: Jesús Gil Manzano (Spain) |

== Statistics ==
=== Appearances and goals ===
| No. | Pos | Nat | Player | Total | | Bundesliga | | DFB-Pokal | | Champions League | |
| No. | Pos | Nat | Player | Apps | Goals | Apps | Goals | Apps | Goals | Apps | Goals |
Goalkeepers
| 23 | GK | (Germany) GER | Michael Zetterer | 28 | 0 | 21+1 | 0 | 1 | 0 | 5 | 0 |
| 33 | GK | (Germany) GER | Jens Grahl | 1 | 0 | 0 | 0 | 1 | 0 | 0 | 0 |
| 39 | GK | (Germany) GER | Amil Šiljević | 0 | 0 | 0 | 0 | 0 | 0 | 0 | 0 |
| 40 | GK | (Brazil) BRA | Kauã Santos | 16 | 0 | 13 | 0 | 0 | 0 | 3 | 0 |
Defenders
| 2 | DF | (Germany) GER | Elias Baum | 5 | 0 | 0+5 | 0 | 0 | 0 | 0 | 0 |
| 3 | DF | (Belgium) BEL | Arthur Theate | 33 | 1 | 24 | 1 | 1 | 0 | 8 | 0 |
| 4 | DF | (Germany) GER | Robin Koch | 42 | 3 | 32 | 3 | 2 | 0 | 8 | 0 |
| 5 | DF | (Switzerland) SUI | Aurèle Amenda | 30 | 0 | 19+6 | 0 | 0 | 0 | 2+3 | 0 |
| 13 | DF | (Denmark) DEN | Rasmus Kristensen | 27 | 3 | 18+3 | 2 | 2 | 0 | 4 | 1 |
| 21 | DF | (Germany) GER | Nathaniel Brown | 42 | 4 | 29+4 | 4 | 1 | 0 | 8 | 0 |
| 22 | DF | (United States) USA | Timothy Chandler | 1 | 0 | 0+1 | 0 | 0 | 0 | 0 | 0 |
| 26 | DF | (Japan) JPN | Keita Kosugi | 0 | 0 | 0 | 0 | 0 | 0 | 0 | 0 |
| 34 | DF | (Germany) GER | Nnamdi Collins | 29 | 1 | 15+7 | 1 | 1 | 0 | 5+1 | 0 |
| 41 | DF | (Mali) MLI | Fousseny Doumbia | 0 | 0 | 0 | 0 | 0 | 0 | 0 | 0 |
| 44 | DF | (Ecuador) ECU | Davis Bautista | 0 | 0 | 0 | 0 | 0 | 0 | 0 | 0 |
| 49 | DF | (Spain) ESP | Derek Boakye Osei | 0 | 0 | 0 | 0 | 0 | 0 | 0 | 0 |
Midfielders
| 6 | MF | (Denmark) DEN | Oscar Højlund | 28 | 1 | 12+12 | 1 | 0+1 | 0 | 1+2 | 0 |
| 7 | MF | (Germany) GER | Ansgar Knauff | 38 | 7 | 12+16 | 4 | 1+1 | 1 | 7+1 | 2 |
| 8 | MF | (Algeria) ALG | Farès Chaïbi | 38 | 3 | 21+7 | 2 | 2 | 0 | 5+3 | 1 |
| 15 | MF | (Tunisia) TUN | Ellyes Skhiri | 34 | 0 | 16+9 | 0 | 0+1 | 0 | 4+4 | 0 |
| 16 | MF | (Sweden) SWE | Hugo Larsson | 34 | 2 | 21+4 | 2 | 2 | 0 | 6+1 | 0 |
| 18 | MF | (Germany) GER | Mahmoud Dahoud | 19 | 2 | 8+7 | 2 | 0 | 0 | 1+3 | 0 |
| 20 | MF | (Japan) JPN | Ritsu Dōan | 40 | 7 | 28+3 | 5 | 2 | 2 | 6+1 | 0 |
| 27 | MF | (Germany) GER | Mario Götze | 29 | 0 | 8+13 | 0 | 1 | 0 | 5+2 | 0 |
| 31 | MF | (Sweden) SWE | Love Arrhov | 5 | 0 | 1+4 | 0 | 0 | 0 | 0 | 0 |
| 37 | MF | (Germany) GER | Jeremiaha Maluze | 0 | 0 | 0 | 0 | 0 | 0 | 0 | 0 |
| 38 | MF | (Germany) GER | Ebu Bekir Is | 0 | 0 | 0 | 0 | 0 | 0 | 0 | 0 |
| 42 | MF | (Turkey) TUR | Can Uzun | 28 | 10 | 15+6 | 8 | 1+1 | 0 | 3+2 | 2 |
| 45 | MF | (United States) USA | Marvin Dills | 1 | 0 | 0 | 0 | 0 | 0 | 0+1 | 0 |
Forwards
| 9 | FW | (Germany) GER | Jonathan Burkardt | 29 | 15 | 15+7 | 13 | 2 | 0 | 4+1 | 2 |
| 11 | FW | (Germany) GER | Younes Ebnoutalib | 5 | 1 | 2+3 | 1 | 0 | 0 | 0 | 0 |
| 19 | FW | (France) FRA | Jean-Mattéo Bahoya | 37 | 4 | 15+12 | 3 | 1+1 | 1 | 2+6 | 0 |
| 25 | FW | (France) FRA | Arnaud Kalimuendo | 19 | 6 | 17+2 | 6 | 0 | 0 | 0 | 0 |
| 29 | FW | (Morocco) MAR | Ayoube Amaimouni | 15 | 1 | 5+10 | 1 | 0 | 0 | 0 | 0 |
| 30 | FW | (Belgium) BEL | Michy Batshuayi | 12 | 2 | 2+6 | 2 | 0+2 | 0 | 0+2 | 0 |
| 48 | FW | (Spain) ESP | Junior Awusi | 0 | 0 | 0 | 0 | 0 | 0 | 0 | 0 |
| 50 | FW | (Germany) GER | Alessandro Gaul Souza | 0 | 0 | 0 | 0 | 0 | 0 | 0 | 0 |
| 53 | FW | (Germany) GER | Alexander Staff | 1 | 0 | 0+1 | 0 | 0 | 0 | 0 | 0 |
Players transferred/loaned out during the season
| 17 | FW | (France) FRA | Elye Wahi | 14 | 1 | 3+7 | 0 | 0+1 | 1 | 0+3 | 0 |
| 29 | DF | (France) FRA | Niels Nkounkou | 1 | 0 | 0 | 0 | 1 | 0 | 0 | 0 |
| 31 | MF | (United States) USA | Paxten Aaronson | 1 | 1 | 0 | 0 | 0+1 | 1 | 0 | 0 |
| 32 | FW | (Germany) GER | Jessic Ngankam | 4 | 0 | 0+3 | 0 | 0 | 0 | 0+1 | 0 |
| 36 | DF | (Portugal) POR | Aurélio Buta | 6 | 0 | 1+3 | 0 | 0 | 0 | 1+1 | 0 |
| 47 | MF | (Hungary) HUN | Noah Fenyő | 0 | 0 | 0 | 0 | 0 | 0 | 0 | 0 |

Last updated: 8 May 2026
Source: Competitions

=== Goalscorers ===
| Rank | No. | Pos. | Nat. | Player | Bundesliga | DFB-Pokal | Champions League | Total |
|---|---|---|---|---|---|---|---|---|
| 1 | 9 | FW | (Germany) | Jonathan Burkardt | 13 | 0 | 2 | 15 |
| 2 | 42 | MF | (Turkey) | Can Uzun | 8 | 0 | 2 | 10 |
| 3 | 7 | MF | (Germany) | Ansgar Knauff | 4 | 1 | 2 | 7 |
| 3 | 20 | MF | (Japan) | Ritsu Dōan | 5 | 2 | 0 | 7 |
| 5 | 25 | FW | (Germany) | Arnaud Kalimuendo | 6 | 0 | 0 | 6 |
| 6 | 19 | FW | (France) | Jean-Mattéo Bahoya | 3 | 1 | 0 | 4 |
| 6 | 21 | DF | (Germany) | Nathaniel Brown | 4 | 0 | 0 | 4 |
| 8 | 4 | DF | (Germany) | Robin Koch | 3 | 0 | 0 | 3 |
| 8 | 8 | MF | (Algeria) | Farès Chaïbi | 3 | 0 | 0 | 3 |
| 8 | 13 | DF | (Denmark) | Rasmus Kristensen | 2 | 0 | 1 | 3 |
| 11 | 16 | MF | (Sweden) | Hugo Larsson | 2 | 0 | 0 | 2 |
| 11 | 18 | MF | (Germany) | Mahmoud Dahoud | 2 | 0 | 0 | 2 |
| 11 | 29 | FW | (Morocco) | Ayoube Amaimouni | 2 | 0 | 0 | 2 |
| 14 | 3 | DF | (Belgium) | Arthur Theate | 1 | 0 | 0 | 1 |
| 14 | 6 | MF | (Denmark) | Oscar Højlund | 1 | 0 | 0 | 1 |
| 14 | 11 | FW | (Germany) | Younes Ebnoutalib | 1 | 0 | 0 | 1 |
| 14 | 17 | FW | (France) | Elye Wahi | 0 | 1 | 0 | 1 |
| 14 | 31 | MF | (United States) | Paxten Aaronson | 0 | 1 | 0 | 1 |
| 14 | 34 | DF | (Germany) | Nnamdi Collins | 1 | 0 | 0 | 1 |
| Own goals | | | | | 0 | 0 | 2 | 2 |
| Totals | | | | | 56 | 5 | 10 | 71 |

Last updated: 16 May 2026

=== Clean sheets ===
| Rank | No. | Pos. | Nat. | Player | Bundesliga | DFB-Pokal | Champions League | Total |
|---|---|---|---|---|---|---|---|---|
| 1 | 23 | GK | (Germany) | Michael Zetterer | 6 | 0 | 1 | 7 |
| 2 | 33 | GK | (Germany) | Jens Grahl | 0 | 1 | 0 | 1 |
| 2 | 40 | GK | (Brazil) | Kauã Santos | 1 | 0 | 0 | 0 |
| Totals | | | | | 7 | 1 | 1 | 9 |

Last updated: 16 May 2026

=== Disciplinary record ===
| No. | Pos. | Nat. | Player | Bundesliga | | | DFB-Pokal | | | Champions League | | | Total | | |
| No. | Pos. | Nat. | Player | Yellow card | (yellow card) (yellow-red card) | Red card | Yellow card | (yellow card) (yellow-red card) | Red card | Yellow card | (yellow card) (yellow-red card) | Red card | Yellow card | (yellow card) (yellow-red card) | Red card |
| 3 | DF | (Belgium) | Arthur Theate | 8 | 0 | 0 | 0 | 0 | 0 | 0 | 0 | 0 | 8 | 0 | 0 |
| 4 | DF | (Germany) | Robin Koch | 1 | 1 | 0 | 0 | 0 | 0 | 0 | 0 | 0 | 1 | 1 | 0 |
| 5 | DF | (Germany) | Aurèle Amenda | 5 | 0 | 0 | 0 | 0 | 0 | 1 | 0 | 0 | 6 | 0 | 0 |
| 6 | MF | (Denmark) | Oscar Højlund | 2 | 1 | 0 | 0 | 0 | 0 | 0 | 0 | 0 | 2 | 1 | 0 |
| 7 | MF | (Germany) | Ansgar Knauff | 3 | 0 | 0 | 0 | 0 | 0 | 1 | 0 | 0 | 4 | 0 | 0 |
| 8 | MF | (Algeria) | Farès Chaïbi | 2 | 0 | 0 | 1 | 0 | 0 | 0 | 0 | 0 | 3 | 0 | 0 |
| 9 | FW | (Germany) | Jonathan Burkardt | 1 | 0 | 0 | 0 | 0 | 0 | 1 | 0 | 0 | 2 | 0 | 0 |
| 13 | DF | (Denmark) | Rasmus Kristensen | 4 | 1 | 0 | 1 | 0 | 0 | 1 | 0 | 0 | 6 | 1 | 0 |
| 15 | MF | (Tunisia) | Ellyes Skhiri | 1 | 1 | 0 | 0 | 0 | 0 | 0 | 0 | 0 | 1 | 1 | 0 |
| 17 | FW | (France) | Elye Wahi | 1 | 0 | 0 | 0 | 0 | 0 | 0 | 0 | 0 | 1 | 0 | 0 |
| 19 | FW | (France) | Jean-Mattéo Bahoya | 2 | 0 | 0 | 0 | 0 | 0 | 0 | 0 | 0 | 2 | 0 | 0 |
| 20 | MF | (Japan) | Ritsu Dōan | 5 | 0 | 0 | 0 | 0 | 0 | 1 | 0 | 0 | 6 | 0 | 0 |
| 21 | DF | (Germany) | Nathaniel Brown | 3 | 0 | 0 | 0 | 0 | 0 | 1 | 0 | 0 | 4 | 0 | 0 |
| 23 | GK | (Germany) | Michael Zetterer | 1 | 0 | 0 | 0 | 0 | 0 | 1 | 0 | 0 | 2 | 0 | 0 |
| 25 | FW | (France) | Arnaud Kalimuendo | 4 | 0 | 0 | 0 | 0 | 0 | 0 | 0 | 0 | 4 | 0 | 0 |
| 27 | MF | (Germany) | Mario Götze | 1 | 0 | 0 | 0 | 0 | 0 | 0 | 0 | 0 | 1 | 0 | 0 |
| 29 | FW | (Morocco) | Ayoube Amaimouni | 1 | 0 | 0 | 0 | 0 | 0 | 0 | 0 | 0 | 1 | 0 | 0 |
| 30 | FW | (Belgium) | Michy Batshuayi | 0 | 0 | 0 | 1 | 0 | 0 | 0 | 0 | 0 | 1 | 0 | 0 |
| 31 | MF | (Sweden) | Love Arrhov | 1 | 0 | 0 | 0 | 0 | 0 | 0 | 0 | 0 | 1 | 0 | 0 |
| 34 | DF | (Germany) | Nnamdi Collins | 4 | 0 | 0 | 1 | 0 | 0 | 0 | 0 | 0 | 5 | 0 | 0 |
| 36 | DF | (Portugal) | Aurélio Buta | 1 | 0 | 0 | 0 | 0 | 0 | 0 | 0 | 0 | 1 | 0 | 0 |
| 42 | MF | (Turkey) | Can Uzun | 3 | 0 | 0 | 0 | 0 | 0 | 0 | 0 | 0 | 3 | 0 | 0 |
| 53 | FW | (Germany) | Alexander Staff | 0 | 0 | 0 | 0 | 0 | 0 | 1 | 0 | 0 | 1 | 0 | 0 |
| Totals | | | | 53 | 4 | 0 | 4 | 0 | 0 | 7 | 0 | 0 | 64 | 4 | 0 |

Last updated: 16 May 2026
