= Eintracht Frankfurt II =

- Full name: Eintracht Frankfurt II
- Nicknames: Amas (Amateurs), U23, Die Adler (Eagles), SGE (Sportgemeinschaft Eintracht)
- Founded: 1899; 2022; 4 years ago
- Dissolved: 2014
- Ground: Sportpark Dreieich, Dreieich
- Capacity: 2,530
- Chairman: Mathias Beck
- Manager: Dennis Schmitt
- League: Regionalliga Südwest (IV)
- 2025–26: Hessenliga, 1st of 18 (promoted)
Home colours	Away colours	Third colours

Eintracht Frankfurt II is the reserve team of Eintracht Frankfurt. Formerly known as Eintracht Frankfurt Amateure (Amateurs) until 2005 the team played as U23 (Under 23) to emphasize the character of the team as a link between youth academy and pro team.

The traditional home ground was the Riederwaldstadion but for safety purposes the team was forced to play at Bornheimer Hang. The ground was actually renovated for local rival FSV Frankfurt but since their unexpected promotion to the 2. Bundesliga and the stricter home ground requirements FSV used to play at Eintracht's actual stadium while the SGE reserves play at their home. From 2009 to 2014 both teams, FSV and Eintracht U23 played at Bornheimer Hang.

Since its re-establishment, the team plays at Sportpark Dreieich.

The squad was frequently supported by Ultras Frankfurt, especially when playing derby matches against Darmstadt and Kassel, both home and away.

== History ==
Eintracht Frankfurt Amateure first played at highest level in Hesse when it earned promotion to the Amateurliga Hessen in 1969, winning the league in its first attempt in 1969–70. The team played in this league, renamed to Amateur-Oberliga Hessen in 1978, for the next 26 seasons, with three runners-up finishes in 1978, 1983 and 1995 as its best results after the 1970 championship. The last of those three allowed the club promotion to the Regionalliga Süd, newly formed the year before. The team lasted for only one season before dropping back to what was now the Oberliga Hessen but won promotion again in 2002. Again it played in the Regionalliga for only one season but in 2008 it qualified for the new Regionalliga Südwest, where it played for six seasons until 2014.

In April 2014, the club board of Eintracht Frankfurt decided to withdraw the U23 team from league operations, as was FSV Frankfurt II and Bayer 04 Leverkusen II, after a ruling by the DFL allowed all Bundesliga and 2. Bundesliga clubs to freely choose whether or not to operate an under-23 reserve team. Previous to that such teams had been compulsory.

On 14 February 2022 Eintracht Frankfurt applied to have a reserves team to be re-admitted to the 5th tier Hessenliga for the 2022–23 season.

On 21 February the Hessian Football Association approved the incorporation of the Eintracht reserves team into the Hessenliga. The team will play at the Hahn Air Sportpark in Dreieich.

The team winning the league in its first attempt in 2022–23.

== Current squad ==
As of 8 September 2026

Note: Flags indicate national team as defined under FIFA eligibility rules; some limited exceptions apply. Players may hold more than one non-FIFA nationality.

No.	Pos.	Nation	Player
1	GK	BIH	Amil Šiljević
2	DF	GER	Maurice Spahn
3	DF	USA	Pedro Guimaraes
4	DF	GER	Julian Etse
5	DF	GER	Benjamin Kirchhoff (captain)
6	MF	GER	Ebu Bekir Is
8	MF	USA	Marvin Dills
9	FW	GER	Lukas Sonnenwald
10	FW	GER	Jonas Bauer
11	FW	GER	Cherif Cisse
13	FW	GER	Alessandro Gaul Souza
14	FW	GER	Sadiki Chemwor
15	DF	GER	Nilo Neuendorff
16	MF	UKR	Davyd Ramaki
17	FW	GER	Paul Wünsch
18	MF	GER	Metehan Yıldırım
19	MF	GER	George Didoss

No.	Pos.	Nation	Player
20	DF	PER	Philipp Eisele Yupanqui
21	DF	GER	Niklas Scheller
22	FW	GER	Clement Nana-Sarhene
23	MF	GER	Niko Iličević
24	DF	ESP	Derek Boakye Osei
27	MF	GER	Collin Owusu Etse
29	DF	GER	Nico Ochojski
30	DF	GER	Jeremiaha Maluze
31	MF	GER	Henrik Peter
33	GK	GER	Emil Möhler
36	FW	JPN	Keito Kumashiro
37	FW	GER	Tobias Weigel
38	MF	GHA	Lawrence Setordjie
39	MF	GER	Christian Prenaj
40	GK	GRE	Sissis Efthimiou
42	MF	JPN	Rinto Hanashiro
45	GK	GER	Benjamin Speight

=== Out on loan ===
Note: Flags indicate national team as defined under FIFA eligibility rules; some limited exceptions apply. Players may hold more than one non-FIFA nationality.

No.	Pos.	Nation	Player
—	DF	GER	Ouassim Karada (at Hansa Rostock until 30 June 2027)
—	FW	MLI	Fousseny Doumbia (at Energie Cottbus until 30 June 2027)

No.	Pos.	Nation	Player
—	FW	GER	Alexander Staff (at 1. FC Saarbrücken until 30 June 2027)

== Famous players ==
- Marcos Álvarez
- Abassin Alikhil (represented Afghanistan while being signed at Eintracht Frankfurt U23)
- Ali Amiri (represented Afghanistan while being signed at Eintracht Frankfurt U23)
- Zubayr Amiri (represented Afghanistan while being signed at Eintracht Frankfurt U23)
- Mimoun Azaouagh
- Matthias Becker
- Manfred Binz
- Rudi Bommer
- Ronny Borchers
- Erol Bulut
- Mounir Chaftar
- Daniyel Cimen
- Christian Demirtaş
- Ralf Fährmann
- Danny Galm
- Baldo di Gregorio
- Giuseppe Gemiti
- Daniel Gunkel
- Matthias Hagner
- Marcel Heller
- Martin Hess
- Petar Hubchev
- Jermaine Jones
- Sebastian Jung
- Jürgen Klopp
- Kevin Kraus
- Benjamin Lense
- Krešo Ljubičić
- Jean-Paul Ndeki
- Markus Neumayr
- Oka Nikolov
- Christoph Preuß
- Peter Reichel
- Christopher Reinhard
- Marco Russ
- Milad Salem (represented Afghanistan while being signed at Eintracht Frankfurt U23)
- Antônio da Silva
- Markus Steinhöfer
- Albert Streit
- Faton Toski
- Cenk Tosun
- Juvhel Tsoumou
- Angelo Vaccaro
- Lars Weißenfeldt
- Jan Zimmermann
- Zia Shaoul

== Managers ==
The recent managers of the club:

- 2000–2005: Bernhard Lippert
- 2005: Armin Kraaz
- 2006–2007: Petar Hubchev
- 2007–2010: Frank Leicht
- 2010–2012: Oscar Corrochano
- 2012–2014: Alexander Schur
- 2022–2024: Kristjan Glibo
- 2024–: Dennis Schmitt

== Honours ==
The club's honours:

=== League ===
- Oberliga Hessen / Hesse Championship
  - Champions: 1970, 2002, 2023, 2026
  - Runners-up: 1978, 1983, 1995
- Landesliga Hessen-Süd
  - Champions: 1969

=== Cup ===
- Hesse Cup
  - Winners: 1969

== Recent seasons ==
The recent season-by-season performance of the club:

Season	Division	Tier	Position
2002–03	Regionalliga Süd	III	18↓
2003–04	Oberliga Hessen	IV	10
2004–05	Oberliga Hessen	IV	12
2005–06	Oberliga Hessen	IV	11
2006–07	Oberliga Hessen	IV	5
2007–08	Oberliga Hessen	IV	4↑
2008–09	Regionalliga Süd	IV	3
2009–10	Regionalliga Süd	IV	8
2010–11	Regionalliga Süd	IV	6
2011–12	Regionalliga Süd	IV	3
2012–13	Regionalliga Südwest	IV	15
2013–14	Regionalliga Südwest	IV	12
2022–23	Hessenliga	V	1↑
2023–24	Regionalliga Südwest	IV	6
2024–25	Regionalliga Südwest	IV	16↓
2025–26	Hessenliga	V	1↑
2026–27	Regionalliga Südwest	IV	

- With the introduction of the Regionalligas in 1994 and the 3. Liga in 2008 as the new third tier, below the 2. Bundesliga, all leagues below dropped one tier. In 2012, the number of Regionalligas was increased from three to five with all Regionalliga Süd clubs except the Bavarian ones entering the new Regionalliga Südwest.

=== Key ===
↑ Promoted	↓ Relegated
