= Martin Hess =

Martin Hess may refer to:

- Martin Hess (footballer), German footballer
- Martin Hess (politician), German politician
