= Aurèle Amenda =

Swiss footballer (born 2003)

Personal information
- Full name: Aurèle Florian Amenda
- Date of birth: 31 July 2003 (age 23)
- Place of birth: Biel/Bienne, Switzerland
- Height: 1.97 m (6 ft 6 in)
- Position: Centre-back

Team information
- Current team: Coventry City
- Number: 24

Youth career
- Etoile Biel
- 2014–2022: Young Boys

Senior career*
| Years | Team | Apps | (Gls) |
| 2020–2022 | Young Boys U21 | 23 | (1) |
| 2022–2024 | Young Boys | 31 | (0) |
| 2024–2026 | Eintracht Frankfurt | 32 | (0) |
| 2024 | → Young Boys (loan) | 12 | (0) |
| 2026– | Coventry City | 4 | (0) |

International career^{‡}
| 2019 | Switzerland U16 | 1 | (0) |
| 2019 | Switzerland U17 | 6 | (0) |
| 2021 | Switzerland U19 | 6 | (0) |
| 2022 | Switzerland U20 | 3 | (0) |
| 2023– | Switzerland U21 | 13 | (1) |
| 2024– | Switzerland | 7 | (0) |
- * Club domestic league appearances and goals as of 16 May 2026 ‡ National team caps and goals as of 6 June 2026

Aurèle Florian Amenda (born 31 July 2003) is a Swiss professional footballer who plays as a centre-back for Premier League club Coventry City and the Switzerland national team.

== Club career ==
=== Young Boys ===
Amenda signed his first professional contract in December 2021 with Young Boys. He made his professional debut for the club on 13 February 2022, replacing Wilfried Kanga in the 85th minute with a 3–1 league win over Basel. He made three more appearances in the 2021–22 season: on 3 April 2022 against Basel, on 9 April 2022 against Lausanne-Sport and on 22 May 2022 against Grasshoppers finishing the season with four games in total.

At the start of the 2022–23 season, Amenda made his European debut on 28 July 2022 with Young Boys in a 3–0 win against Liepāja in the UEFA Europa Conference League qualifier match. He played two matches for Young Boys in the 2022–23 Swiss Super League.

=== Eintracht Frankfurt ===
On 7 February 2024, Amenda was announced at Eintracht Frankfurt from 1 July 2024, signing a five year contract with the club.

=== Coventry City ===
On 16 July 2026, Amenda signed with Premier League club Coventry City on a "long-term contract" for an undisclosed fee.

== International career ==
Amenda represented Switzerland at youth international level.

Amenda made his Switzerland national team debut on 15 November 2024 in a Nations League game against Serbia at Letzigrund. He played the full game in a 1–1 draw.

On 20 May 2026, Amenda was selected in the 26-man squad for the 2026 FIFA World Cup.

== Style of play ==
Amenda is a centre-back with physical attributes including height and speed. He participates in a defensive play through his aerial and ground challenges, including tackling. In addition to these attributes, he moves the ball forward by dribbling into the opposition's half or using long-range passing. He is noted for maintaining composure in various situations and demonstrates having leadership qualities.

== Personal life ==
Aurèle Amenda was born and raised in Switzerland. He is the child of a family originally from Cameroon.

== Career statistics ==
=== Club ===
As of match played 16 September 2026

Appearances and goals by club, season and competition
| Club | Season | League | | | National cup (Note: Includes Swiss Cup, DFB-Pokal) | | League cup | | Europe | | Other | | Total | |
| Club | Season | Division | Apps | Goals | Apps | Goals | Apps | Goals | Apps | Goals | Apps | Goals | Apps | Goals |
|---|---|---|---|---|---|---|---|---|---|---|---|---|---|---|
| Young Boys U21 | 2020–21 | Swiss 1. Liga | 1 | 0 | — | | — | | — | | 0 | 0 | 1 | 0 |
| Young Boys U21 | 2021–22 | Swiss Promotion League | 15 | 0 | — | | — | | — | | 1 (Note: Appearance in Swiss Promotion League promotion play-offs) | 0 | 16 | 0 |
| Young Boys U21 | 2022–23 | Swiss Promotion League | 7 | 1 | — | | — | | — | | 0 | 0 | 7 | 1 |
| Young Boys U21 | Total | | 23 | 1 | — | | — | | — | | 1 | 0 | 24 | 1 |
| Young Boys | 2021–22 | Swiss Super League | 4 | 0 | 0 | 0 | — | | 0 | 0 | — | | 4 | 0 |
| Young Boys | 2022–23 | Swiss Super League | 16 | 0 | 3 | 0 | — | | 2 (Note: Appearances in UEFA Conference League) | 0 | — | | 21 | 0 |
| Young Boys | 2023–24 | Swiss Super League | 11 | 0 | 2 | 0 | — | | 4 (Note: Appearances in UEFA Champions League) | 0 | — | | 17 | 0 |
| Young Boys | Total | | 31 | 0 | 5 | 0 | — | | 6 | 0 | — | | 42 | 0 |
| Young Boys (loan) | 2023–24 | Swiss Super League | 12 | 0 | 1 | 0 | — | | 2 (Note: Appearances in UEFA Europa League) | 0 | — | | 15 | 0 |
| Eintracht Frankfurt | 2024–25 | Bundesliga | 8 | 0 | 1 | 0 | — | | 4 | 0 | — | | 13 | 0 |
| Eintracht Frankfurt | 2025–26 | Bundesliga | 24 | 0 | 0 | 0 | — | | 5 | 0 | — | | 29 | 0 |
| Eintracht Frankfurt | Total | | 32 | 0 | 1 | 0 | — | | 9 | 0 | — | | 42 | 0 |
| Coventry City | 2026–27 | Premier League | 4 | 0 | 0 | 0 | 2 | 0 | — | | — | | 6 | 0 |
| Career total | | | 102 | 1 | 7 | 0 | 1 | 0 | 17 | 0 | 1 | 0 | 129 | 1 |

=== International ===
As of match played 6 June 2026

Appearances and goals by national team and year
| National team | Year | Apps | Goals |
|---|---|---|---|
| Switzerland | 2024 | 1 | 0 |
| Switzerland | 2025 | 3 | 0 |
| Switzerland | 2026 | 3 | 0 |
| Total | | 7 | 0 |

== Honours ==
Young Boys

- Swiss Super League: 2022–23
- Swiss Cup: 2022–23
