= Sadiki Chemwor =

German footballer (born 2008)

Personal information
- Date of birth: 19 January 2008 (age 18)
- Place of birth: England
- Positions: Winger; attacking midfielder; forward

Team information
- Current team: Eintracht Frankfurt II
- Number: 14

Youth career
- –2016: TSV Milbertshofen
- 2016–2026: Bayern Munich

Senior career*
Years	Team	Apps	(Gls)
2026	Bayern Munich II	3	(0)
2026–	Eintracht Frankfurt II	9	(0)

International career^{‡}
2024	Germany U16	2	(0)
2024	Germany U17	3	(0)
- * Club domestic league appearances and goals as of 1 November 2026 ‡ National team caps and goals as of 10 September 2024

Sadiki Chemwor (born 19 January 2008) is a professional footballer who plays as a winger, attacking midfielder and forward for Regionalliga Südwest club Eintracht Frankfurt II. Born in England, he is a former German youth international.

== Club career ==
=== Bayern Munich ===
Chemwor is a youth product of TSV Milbertshofen, later joining the youth academy of Bundesliga giants Bayern Munich in 2016.

He received his first call-up with Bayern Munich II during the 2025–26 season on 21 March 2026, in a 1–1 away draw Regionalliga Bayern match against Greuther Fürth II, as an unused substitute however. Chemwor was called up again with Bayern Munich II on 6 April 2026, during a 1–0 home win Regionalliga Bayern match against DJK Vilzing, but did not play.

He made his professional debut with Bayern Munich II on 17 April 2026, during a 2–1 home loss Regionalliga Bayern match against SpVgg Ansbach, substituting Kurt Rüger at the 78th minute.

=== Eintracht Frankfurt ===
After his contract with Bayern Munich expired, Chemwor left the club after a decade, and joined fellow Bundesliga club Eintracht Frankfurt as a free agent on 1 July 2026, ahead of the 2026–27 season, having already signed a contract with the club in March 2026, set to initially join the reserve team.

== International career ==
Chemwor was born in England, and is of Kenyan descent. He holds dual German and English citizenship, making him eligible to represent either nation. He has represented Germany at the under-16 and under-17 levels.

== Career statistics ==
As of match played 22 August 2026

Appearances and goals by club, season and competition
Club	Season	League			Cup		Total	
Club	Season	Division	Apps	Goals	Apps	Goals	Apps	Goals
Bayern Munich II	2025–26	Regionalliga Bayern	3	0	—		3	0
Bayern Munich II	Total		3	0	—		3	0
Eintracht Frankfurt II	2026–27	Regionalliga Südwest	1	0	—		1	0
Eintracht Frankfurt II	Total		1	0	—		1	0
Career Total			4	0	0	0	4	0
