= Dennis Schmitt (footballer) =

German footballer (born 1993)

Personal information
- Date of birth: 27 May 1993 (age 33)
- Place of birth: Aschaffenburg, Germany
- Height: 1.76 m (5 ft 9 in)
- Position: Midfielder

Youth career
- Viktoria Aschaffenburg
- –2012: Mainz 05

Senior career*
Years	Team	Apps	(Gls)
2012–2014	Mainz 05 II	41	(0)
2014–2017	Würzburger Kickers	18	(0)
2015–2018	Würzburger Kickers II	69	(1)

Managerial career
- 2023–2024: SC Paderborn II
- 2024–: Eintracht Frankfurt II
- 2026: Eintracht Frankfurt (interim)
- * Club domestic league appearances and goals

Dennis Schmitt (born 27 May 1993) is a retired German footballer who played as a midfielder. He last served as interim manager of Eintracht Frankfurt.

== Career ==
=== Coaching career ===
Ahead of the 2017-18 season, 25-year old Schmitt decided to end his professional career after three seasons with the Würzburger Kickers. He would instead serve as a playing assistant coach for the club's reserve team under manager Christian Demirtaş. Ahead of the 2018-19 season, Schmitt ended his player career completely and was hired in a new role as a scout for the first team. Later in December 2018, he also became a part of the first team coaching staff.

In June 2019, Schmitt was hired as an assistant coach at Belgian side Royal Excel Mouscron under Bernd Hollerbach, which he knew from his time in Würzburger Kickers. He left the club at the end of the 2019-20 season. Ahead of the 2021-22 season, Schmitt once again joined Hollerbach's coaching staff; this time at Sint-Truidense.

In June 2022, Schmitt was appointed manager of the U19 team of SC Paderborn 07. Ahead of the upcoming 2023-24 season, he was promoted to reserve team manager.

He was appointed as the interim head coach of Eintracht Frankfurt in January 2026 for one game.
