= Love Arrhov =

Swedish footballer (born 2008)

Personal information
- Full name: Paul Love Arrhov
- Date of birth: 17 May 2008 (age 18)
- Place of birth: Vasastan, Stockholm, Sweden
- Height: 1.78 m (5 ft 10 in)
- Position: Midfielder

Team information
- Current team: Eintracht Frankfurt
- Number: 31

Youth career
- 2015–2018: Vasastan BK
- 2019–2024: Brommapojkarna

Senior career*
Years	Team	Apps	(Gls)
2025	Brommapojkarna	20	(1)
2026–	Eintracht Frankfurt	8	(0)

International career^{‡}
2023–2024	Sweden U16	10	(2)
2024–2025	Sweden U17	6	(2)
2025–	Sweden U19	12	(3)
- * Club domestic league appearances and goals as of 24 October 2026 ‡ National team caps and goals as of 30 September 2026

Paul Love Arrhov (born 17 May 2008) is a Swedish professional footballer who plays as a midfielder for Bundesliga club Eintracht Frankfurt.

== Club career ==
A youth product of Vasastan BK since the age of 7, Arrhov moved to Brommapojkarna's youth academy in 2019. He made his senior and professional debut with Brommapojkarna in a 0–0 Svenska Cupen tie with IK Brage on 16 February 2025. On 16 May 2025, he signed a pre-contract with Bundesliga side Eintracht Frankfurt with the move slated for 1 January 2026.

== International career ==
Arrhov is a youth international, having played for the Sweden U17s in August 2024.

== Career statistics ==
As of match played 27 October 2026

Appearances and goals by club, season and competition
Club	Season	League			National cup (Note: Includes Svenska Cupen)		Europe		Other		Total	
Club	Season	Division	Apps	Goals	Apps	Goals	Apps	Goals	Apps	Goals	Apps	Goals
Brommapojkarna	2025	Allsvenskan	20	1	4	2	—		—		24	2
Eintracht Frankfurt	2025–26	Bundesliga	5	0	—		—		—		5	0
Eintracht Frankfurt	2026–27	Bundesliga	3	0	2	0	—		—		5	0
Eintracht Frankfurt	Total		8	0	2	0	—		—		10	0
Career total			28	1	6	2	0	0	0	0	34	2
