= Marvin Dills =

American soccer player (born 2007)

Personal information
- Date of birth: April 25, 2007 (age 19)
- Place of birth: Frankfurt, Germany
- Height: 5 ft 10 in (1.78 m)
- Position: Midfielder

Team information
- Current team: Eintracht Frankfurt II
- Number: 8

Youth career
- –2018: TuS Makkabi Frankfurt
- 2018–: Eintracht Frankfurt

Senior career*
Years	Team	Apps	(Gls)
2025–	Eintracht Frankfurt II	33	(2)
2025–2026	Eintracht Frankfurt	0	(0)

International career^{‡}
2025	United States U18	4	(0)
2025	Germany U18	2	(0)
2025–	United States U19	4	(2)
- * Club domestic league appearances and goals as of August 29, 2026 ‡ National team caps and goals as of November 18, 2025

Marvin Dills (born April 25, 2007) is a professional soccer player who plays as a midfielder for Regionalliga Südwest side Eintracht Frankfurt II. Born in Germany, he represents the United States at youth level.

== Early life ==
Dills was born on April 25, 2007. Born in Frankfurt, Germany, he is a native of the city.

== Club career ==
As a youth player, Dills joined the youth academy of German side TuS Makkabi Frankfurt. Following his stint there, he joined the youth academy of German Bundesliga side Eintracht Frankfurt at the age of eleven and was promoted to the club's reserve team ahead of the 2025–26 season.

Dills made his debut for Eintracht's senior team on January 28, 2026 in a Champions League game against Tottenham Hotspur.

== International career ==
Dills is a Germany and United States youth international. On October 14, 2025, he debuted for the United States men's national under-19 soccer team during a 2–2 away friendly draw with the Belgium national under-19 football team.

== Style of play ==
Dills plays as a midfielder. German newspaper Frankfurter Allgemeine Zeitung wrote in 2025 that he "is fast, has excellent vision, and thanks to his precise technique, is able to both finish and create chances... [has] a low center of gravity. As a small, agile dribbler, he is difficult to mark and can dominate in tight spaces with close ball control".

== Career statistics ==
As of match played January 28, 2026

Appearances and goals by club, season and competition
Club	Season	League			Cup		Europe		Other		Total	
Club	Season	Division	Apps	Goals	Apps	Goals	Apps	Goals	Apps	Goals	Apps	Goals
Eintracht Frankfurt II	2025–26	Hessenliga	16	1	—		—		—		16	1
Eintracht Frankfurt	2025–26	Bundesliga	0	0	0	0	1 (Note: Appearance in UEFA Champions League)	0	—		1	0
Career total			16	1	0	0	1	0	0	0	17	1
