= Alexander Staff =

German footballer (born 2008)

Personal information
- Date of birth: 12 June 2008 (age 18)
- Place of birth: Dieburg, Germany
- Height: 1.82 m (6 ft 0 in)
- Position: Forward

Team information
- Current team: 1. FC Saarbrücken; (on loan from Eintracht Frankfurt)
- Number: 29

Youth career
- 2011–2017: SC Hassia Dieburg
- 2017–2018: Darmstadt 98
- 2018–2026: Eintracht Frankfurt

Senior career*
Years	Team	Apps	(Gls)
2024–	Eintracht Frankfurt II	11	(2)
2025–	Eintracht Frankfurt	0	(0)
2026–	→ 1. FC Saarbrücken (loan)	12	(3)

International career^{‡}
2023	Germany U15	2	(0)
2023–2024	Germany U16	8	(6)
2024–2025	Germany U17	22	(15)
2026–	Germany U19	6	(3)
- * Club domestic league appearances and goals as of 1 November 2026 ‡ National team caps and goals as of 3 October 2026

Alexander Staff (German pronunciation: [alɛkˈsandɐ ʃtaːf]; born 12 June 2008) is a German professional footballer who plays as a forward for 3. Liga club 1. FC Saarbrücken, on loan from Eintracht Frankfurt.

== Early life ==
Staff was born on 12 June 2008. Born in Dieburg, Germany, he is of American descent through his grandfather.

== Club career ==
As a youth player, Staff joined the youth academy of SC Hassia Dieburg. Following his stint there, he joined the youth academy of Darmstadt 98 in 2017.

Ahead of the 2018–19 season, he joined the youth academy of Bundesliga side Eintracht Frankfurt, where he played in the UEFA Youth League and was promoted to the club's reserve team in 2024.

Staff made his debut for Eintracht Frankfurt's senior team on 21 January 2026 during a 2025–26 UEFA Champions League league phase game against Qarabağ.

On 27 June 2026, he was loaned to 1. FC Saarbrücken in the 3. Liga.

== International career ==
Eligible to represent both his birth nation and the United States internationally, Staff is a German youth international. During November 2025, he played for the Germany national under-17 football team at the 2025 FIFA U-17 World Cup.

== Career statistics ==
As of match played 14 March 2026

Appearances and goals by club, season and competition
Club	Season	League			Cup		Europe		Other		Total	
Club	Season	Division	Apps	Goals	Apps	Goals	Apps	Goals	Apps	Goals	Apps	Goals
Eintracht Frankfurt II	2024–25	Regionalliga Südwest	6	1	—		—		—		6	1
Eintracht Frankfurt II	2025–26	Hessenliga	4	1	—		—		—		4	1
Eintracht Frankfurt II	Total		10	2	—		—		—		10	2
Eintracht Frankfurt	2025–26	Bundesliga	0	0	0	0	1 (Note: Appearance in UEFA Champions League)	0	—		1	0
Career total			10	2	0	0	1	0	0	0	11	2

== Honours ==
Individual

- Fritz Walter Medal: U17 Gold Medal 2025
