= Rinto Hanashiro =

Japanese footballer (born 2005)

Rinto Hanashiro 花城 琳斗
Personal information
- Date of birth: 12 September 2005 (age 21)
- Place of birth: Japan
- Height: 1.70 m (5 ft 7 in)
- Position: Midfielder

Team information
- Current team: Eintracht Frankfurt II

Youth career
- –2023: JFA Academy Fukushima

Senior career*
Years	Team	Apps	(Gls)
2024–2025	VfB Stuttgart II	7	(0)
2025–	Eintracht Frankfurt II	19	(2)

International career^{‡}
2023	Japan U18	1	(0)
2024	Japan U19	2	(0)
- * Club domestic league appearances and goals as of 26 June 2026 ‡ National team caps and goals as of 21 March 2024

Rinto Hanashiro (花城 琳斗, Hanashiro Rinto; born 12 September 2005) is a Japanese professional footballer who plays as a midfielder for German fifth-tier Hessenliga team Eintracht Frankfurt II.

== Early life ==
Hanashiro was born on 12 September 2005 in Japan and is the older brother of Japanese footballer Eita Hanashiro, who plays for Kamimura Gakuen High School football team. A native of Okinawa Prefecture, Japan, he attended school in Gotemba, Japan and Mishima, Japan.

== Club career ==
As a youth player, Hanashiro joined the youth academy of Japanese side JFA Academy Fukushima. In 2024, he signed for German side VfB Stuttgart II, helping the club achieve promotion from the fourth tier to the third tier. On 3 March 2024, he debuted for the club during a 2–2 home draw with TSG Balingen in the league.

== International career ==
Hanashiro is a Japan youth international. On 18 November 2023, he debuted for the Japan national under-18 football team during a 2–3 away friendly loss to the England national under-19 football team.

== Style of play ==
Hanashiro plays as a midfielder. Japanese news website Football Channel wrote in 2024 that he "is a player with outstanding technique who can activate his teammates' attacks with his creative plays. He also has instantaneous speed and dedicated defense".
