= Danny Galm =

German football manager (born 1986)

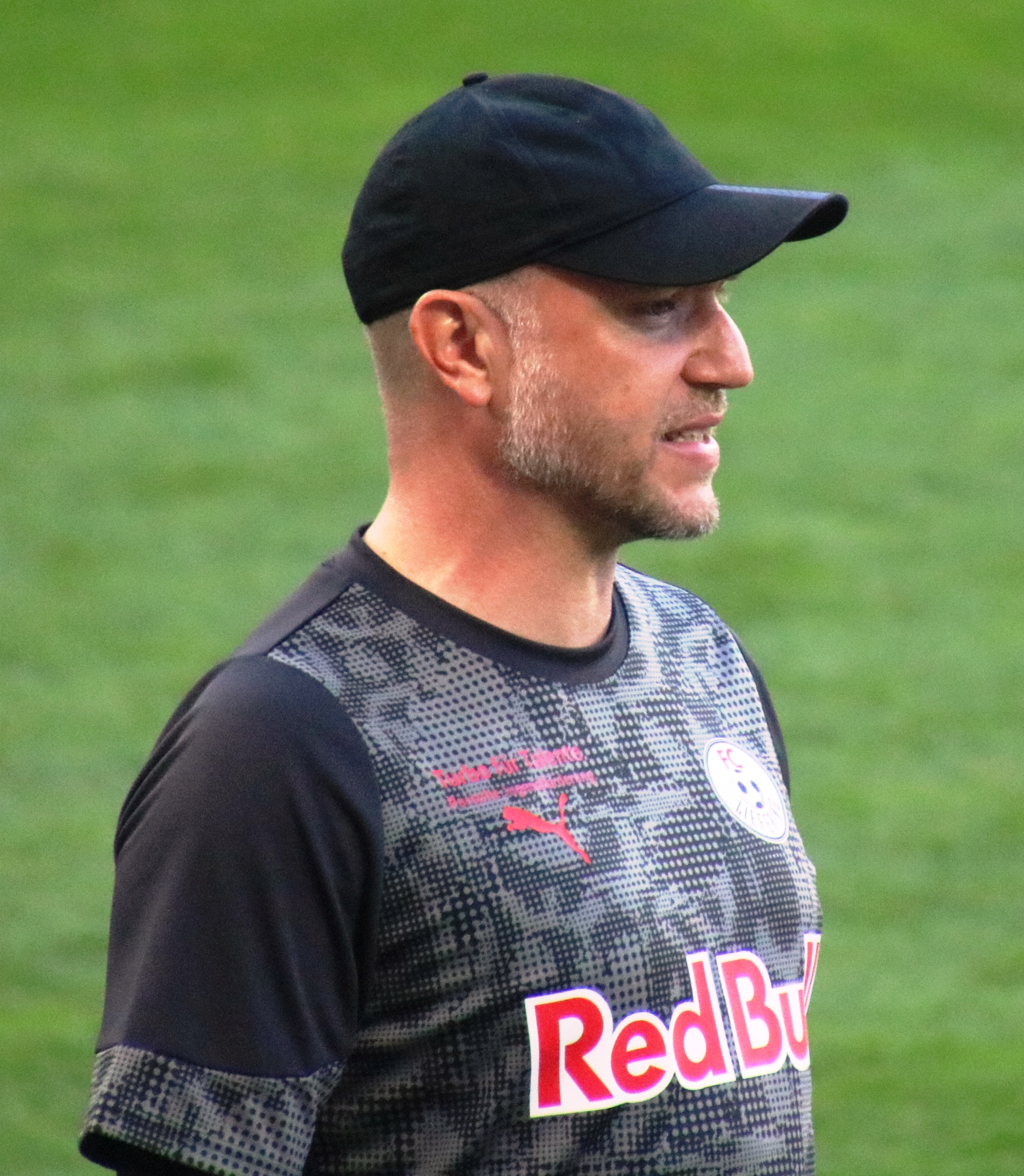
- Galm with FC Liefering in 2026

Personal information
- Date of birth: 17 March 1986 (age 40)
- Place of birth: Miltenberg, West Germany
- Height: 1.79 m (5 ft 10 in)
- Position: Striker

Team information
- Current team: FC Liefering (manager)

Youth career
- 1989–1998: TSV Amorbach
- 1998–2001: Kickers Offenbach
- 2001–2002: 1860 Munich
- 2002–2005: VfB Stuttgart

Senior career*
Years	Team	Apps	(Gls)
2005–2007	VfB Stuttgart II	52	(9)
2007–2008	Eintracht Frankfurt II	30	(17)
2008–2009	Energie Cottbus II	16	(1)
2009	Stuttgarter Kickers	14	(3)
2009–2010	1. FC Kaiserslautern II	12	(0)
2011–2016	SpVgg Neckarelz	94	(21)
2016	Viktoria Aschaffenburg	2	(0)
Total		220	(51)

International career
2001–2002	Germany U16	9	(0)
2005	Germany U19	1	(0)

Managerial career
- 2023: SV Sandhausen
- 2026–: FC Liefering
- * Club domestic league appearances and goals

Danny Galm (born 17 March 1986) is a German professional football manager and former player who played as a striker. He currently manages FC Liefering.

== Career ==
Having previously played for VfB Stuttgart II, Eintracht Frankfurt II, and Energie Cottbus, he joined Stuttgarter Kickers in February 2009, but transferred to 1. FC Kaiserslautern II after Stuttgarter Kickers were relegated from the 3. Liga. He spent four-and-a-half seasons with SpVgg Neckarelz. After a half-season with Viktoria Aschaffenburg, he ended his playing career. In June 2023, he took over the head coaching role at SV Sandhausen at the start of the 2023–24 season. He was sacked in October 2023.

In February 2026, he succeeded Daniel Beichler as manager of Austrian club FC Liefering.

== Managerial statistics ==
As of match played 31 July 2026

Managerial record by team and tenure
Team	From	To	Record				
Team	From	To	P	W	D	L	Win %
SV Sandhausen	1 July 2023	22 October 2023	15	7	4	4	46.7
FC Liefering	18 February 2026	Present	13	9	1	3	69.2
Total			28	16	5	7	57.1
