= Keito Kumashiro =

Japanese footballer (born 2007)

Personal information
- Date of birth: 25 October 2007 (age 19)
- Place of birth: Kumamoto, Japan
- Height: 1.83 m (6 ft 0 in)
- Position: Forward

Team information
- Current team: Eintracht Frankfurt II
- Number: 36

Youth career
- –2023: Roasso Kumamoto

Senior career*
Years	Team	Apps	(Gls)
2024–2025	Roasso Kumamoto	40	(13)
2026–	Eintracht Frankfurt II	16	(12)

International career
2022–2023	Japan U16	6	(3)
2026–	Japan U19	3	(0)
- * Club domestic league appearances and goals as of 24 September 2026

Keito Kumashiro (神代 慶人, Kumashiro Keito; born 25 October 2007) is a Japanese professional footballer who plays as a forward for Eintracht Frankfurt II.

== Early life ==
Kumashiro was born on 25 October 2007. Born in Kumamoto, Japan, he is a native of the city. Growing up, he attended Tokai University Kumamoto Seisho Senior High School in Japan.

== Club career ==
As a youth player, Kumashiro joined the youth academy of Japanese side Roasso Kumamoto and was promoted to the club's senior team in 2024, where he made forty league appearances and scored thirteen goals. Following his stint there, he signed for German side Eintracht Frankfurt II in 2026.

== International career ==
Kumashiro is a Japan youth international. On 25 March 2026, he debuted for the Japan national under-19 football team during a 1–0 away friendly win over the Uzbekistan national under-20 football team.

== Style of play ==
Kumashiro plays as a forward. Japanese news website Sports Bull wrote in 2025 that "standing at 181cm and weighing 76kg, Kamishiro possesses a formidable physique. He has consistently displayed powerful ball control, a fierce right-footed shot".
