= Christian Demirtaş =

German footballer

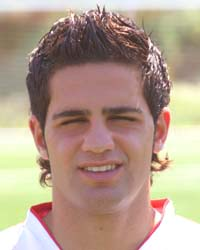
- Demirtaş in 2006

Personal information
- Date of birth: 25 May 1984 (age 42)
- Place of birth: Offenbach am Main, West Germany
- Height: 1.74 m (5 ft 9 in)
- Position: Right-back

Team information
- Current team: VfR Aalen (manager)

Youth career
- SG Nieder-Roden
- JSG Rodgau
- 1997–2002: Eintracht Frankfurt

Senior career*
Years	Team	Apps	(Gls)
2002–2009	Mainz 05 II	58	(5)
2004–2009	Mainz 05	77	(0)
2009–2011	Karlsruher SC	28	(0)
2010–2011	→ Karlsruher SC II	3	(0)
2012	Carl Zeiss Jena	16	(0)
2012–2014	Syrianska FC	18	(0)
2014	SV Wiesbaden	13	(3)
2014–2016	Würzburger Kickers	39	(0)
Total		252	(8)

Managerial career
- 2022–: VfR Aalen
- * Club domestic league appearances and goals

Christian Demirtaş (born 25 May 1984) is a German-Turkish former professional footballer who manages VfR Aalen. He played as a right-back.

== Career ==
Demirtaş joined Swedish club Syrianska FC in summer 2012.

He ended his playing career in 2016 and continued as a coach at Würzburger Kickers.

In February 2022 he succeeded Uwe Wolf as manager of VfR Aalen.

== Personal life ==
Demirtas is of Aramean descent, with roots in Turkey near the Syrian border.
