= Martin Hess (footballer) =

German footballer

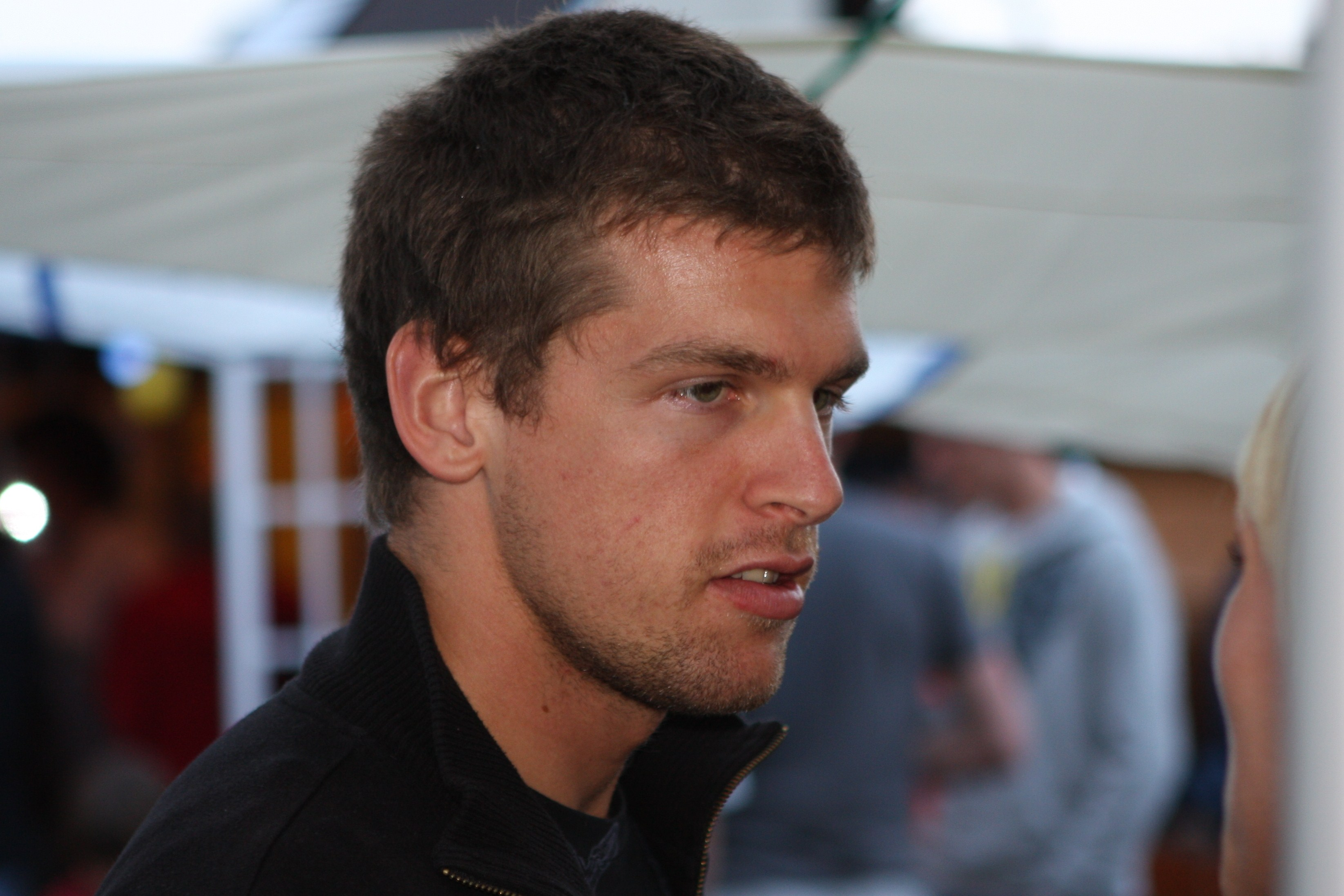
- Hess at the Eintracht Frankfurt 2008 season end party

Personal information
- Date of birth: 6 February 1987 (age 39)
- Place of birth: Heilbronn, West Germany
- Height: 1.83 m (6 ft 0 in)
- Position: Forward

Team information
- Current team: FSV Friedrichshaller (player-assistant)
- Number: 26

Youth career
- –2000: TSV Biberach
- 2000–2002: TSG Heilbronn
- 2002–2006: VfB Stuttgart

Senior career*
Years	Team	Apps	(Gls)
2006–2007	VfB Stuttgart II	4	(0)
2007–2010	Eintracht Frankfurt II	70	(36)
2007–2010	Eintracht Frankfurt	1	(0)
2010–2011	Wacker Burghausen	12	(2)
2011–2012	Sportfreunde Lotte	37	(7)
2012–2013	Waldhof Mannheim	25	(7)
2013–2014	TSV Schluchtern	20	(19)
2014–2017	Neckarsulmer Sport-Union	60	(42)
2017–2018	TSV Ilshofen		
2022–	FSV Friedrichshaller		

Managerial career
- 2022–: FSV Friedrichshaller (player-assistant)
- * Club domestic league appearances and goals

Martin Hess (born 6 February 1987) is a German footballer who plays as a forward for FSV Friedrichshaller.
