= 2018–19 SV Darmstadt 98 season =

SV Darmstadt 98
2018–19 season
- Chairman: Klaus Rüdiger Fritsch
- Manager: Dirk Schuster
- Stadium: Merck-Stadion am Böllenfalltor
- 2. Bundesliga: 10th
- DFB-Pokal: Second round
- Top goalscorer: League: Serdar Dursun (11); All: Serdar Dursun (11)
Home colours	Away colours	Third colours

The 2018–19 season was the 121st season in the history of SV Darmstadt 98 and their 19th overall season in the second tier of German football, the 2. Bundesliga. It was the club's second consecutive season in the second division, since relegation from the Bundesliga in 2016-17.

== Squad ==
=== Squad information ===
As of 2 February 2026

Note: Flags indicate national team as defined under FIFA eligibility rules; some limited exceptions apply. Players may hold more than one non-FIFA nationality.

No.	Pos.	Nation	Player
1	GK	GER	Marcel Schuhen (captain)
2	DF	ESP	Sergio López
4	DF	USA	Grayson Dettoni (on loan from Bayern Munich II)
5	DF	CRO	Matej Maglica
6	DF	GHA	Patric Pfeiffer
7	FW	SWE	Isac Lidberg
8	FW	GER	Luca Marseiler
9	FW	SCO	Fraser Hornby
15	MF	BUL	Fabian Nürnberger
16	MF	JPN	Hiroki Akiyama (on loan from Albirex Niigata)
17	MF	GER	Kai Klefisch
18	DF	ITA	Raoul Petretta
19	FW	GER	Fynn Lakenmacher
20	DF	SRB	Aleksandar Vukotić

No.	Pos.	Nation	Player
21	MF	GER	Merveille Papela
22	FW	GER	Serhat-Semih Güler
23	MF	GER	Marco Richter (on loan from Mainz 05)
24	GK	GER	Benedikt Börner
26	DF	GER	Matthias Bader
27	FW	POL	Bartosz Białek
30	GK	GER	Alexander Brunst
31	MF	GER	Niklas Schmidt (on loan from Toulouse)
32	DF	GER	Fabian Holland
34	FW	FRA	Killian Corredor
44	FW	JPN	Yosuke Furukawa
46	DF	GER	Tim Arnold
48	DF	GER	Max Pfister

=== Transfers ===
==== In ====
No.	Pos.	Name	Age	NAT	EU	Moving from	Type	Transfer Window	Contract ends	Transfer fee	Sources
19	Forward	Serdar Dursun	26	Germany	Yes	Greuther Fürth	Transfer	Summer	30 June 2021	Unknown	
28	Defender	Marcel Franke	25	Germany	Yes	Norwich City	Loan	Summer	30 June 2019		
20	Midfielder	Marcel Heller	32	Germany	Yes	FC Augsburg	Transfer	Summer	30 June 2020	€350,000	
2	Defender	Sebastian Hertner	26	Germany	Yes	Erzgebirge Aue	Transfer	Summer	30 June 2020	Free	
40	Defender	Tim Rieder	24	Germany	Yes	FC Augsburg	Loan	Summer	30 June 2019	Free	
22	Goalkeeper	Rouven Sattelmaier	30	Germany	Yes	Bradford City	Transfer	Summer	30 June 2019	Free	
9	Forward	Johannes Wurtz	26	Germany	Yes	VfL Bochum	Transfer	Summer	30 June 2021	€100,000	
8	Forward	Selim Gündüz	23	Germany	Yes	VfL Bochum	Transfer	Summer	30 June 2020	Free	
38	Goalkeeper	Max Grün	31	Germany	Yes	VfL Wolfsburg	Free Transfer	Summer	30 June 2020	Free	

==== Out ====
No.	Pos.	Name	Age	NAT	Moving to	Type	Transfer Window	Transfer fee	Sources
-	Forward	Baris Atik	23	Germany	TSG Hoffenheim	End of loan	Summer	-	
-	Defender	Patrick Banggaard	24	Denmark	Pafos FC	Loan	Summer	-	
-	Defender	Romain Brégerie	31	France	FC Ingolstadt	End of loan	Summer	-	
-	Defender	Joao da Cunha	19	Brazil	Unknown	Contract termination	Summer	-	
-	Defender	Manasse Eshelé	19	DR Congo	TSV Havelse	Contract termination	Summer	Free	
-	Midfielder	Kevin Grosskreutz	28	Germany	KFC Uerdingen	Transfer	Summer	€350,000	
-	Midfielder	Ji Dong-won	26	South Korea	FC Augsburg	End of loan	Summer	-	
-	Forward	Jamie Maclaren	25	Australia	Hibernian FC	Loan	Summer	Free	
-	Goalkeeper	Joël Mall	27	Switzerland	Pafos FC	Transfer	Summer	–	
-	Forward	Artur Sobiech	28	Poland	Lechia Gdańsk	Transfer	Summer	Free	
-	Midfielder	Julian von Haacke	23	Germany	SV Meppen	Loan	Summer	–	
-	Forward	SIlas Zehnder	19	Germany	Viktoria Aschaffenburg	Loan	Summer	–	
-	Defender	Markus Steinhöfer	32	Germany	Unknown	Contract termination	Summer	–	
-	Midfielder	Romuald Lacazette	24	France	1860 Munich	Loan	Summer	–	
-	Defender	Peter Niemeyer	34	Germany	Unknown	End of contract	Summer	–	
-	Forward	Jan Rosenthal	31	Germany	-	End of Career	Summer	-	

== Competitions ==
=== 2. Bundesliga ===
==== League table ====
Pos	Team	Pld	W	D	L	GF	GA	GD	Pts
8	Jahn Regensburg	34	12	13	9	55	54	+1	49
9	FC St. Pauli	34	14	7	13	46	53	−7	49
10	Darmstadt 98	34	13	7	14	45	53	−8	46
11	VfL Bochum	34	11	11	12	49	50	−1	44
12	Dynamo Dresden	34	11	9	14	41	48	−7	42

Source: DFB
Rules for classification: 1) Points; 2) Goal difference; 3) Goals scored; 4) Head-to-head points; 5) Head-to-head goal difference; 6) Head-to-head goals scored; 7) Head-to-head away goals scored; 8) Away goals scored; 9) Play-off.

==== Results summary ====
Overall								Home						Away					
Pld	W	D	L	GF	GA	GD	Pts	W	D	L	GF	GA	GD	W	D	L	GF	GA	GD
34	13	7	14	45	53	−8	46	9	4	4	25	17	+8	4	3	10	20	36	−16

Last updated: 3 February 2018.
Source: 2. Bundesliga

==== Matches ====
5 August 2018 1	Darmstadt 98	1–0	SC Paderborn 07	Darmstadt
15:30	Dursun 52'; Holland (yellow card) 54'; Sulu (yellow card) 64'; Heuer (yellow card) 71'	Report	Michel (yellow card) 45'; Tietz (yellow card) 62'; Schonlau (yellow card) 72', (penalty missed) 77; Ritter (yellow card) 86'	Stadium: Merck-Stadion am Böllenfalltor; Attendance: 15,400; Referee: B. Dankert

10 August 2018 2	FC St. Pauli	2–0	Darmstadt 98	Hamburg
20:30	Flum (yellow card) 37'; Neudecker 52'; Ziereis (yellow card) 75'; Buchtmann 85'; Sobota (yellow card) 87'	Report	Kempe (yellow card) 49'; Medojević (yellow card) 75'; Sulu (yellow card) 78'	Stadium: Millerntor-Stadion; Attendance: 29,140; Referee: G. Winkmann

24 August 2018 3	Darmstadt 98	3–0	MSV Duisburg	Darmstadt
18:30	Heller 68'; Dursun 74'; Kempe 86'	Report		Stadium: Merck-Stadion am Böllenfalltor; Attendance: 15,170; Referee: Robert Hartmann

10 August 2018 4	1. FC Heidenheim	0–1	Darmstadt 98	Heidenheim
20:30	Dovedan (yellow card) 45+2'	Report	Franke 11', (yellow card) 21'; Holland (yellow card) 45+2'	Stadium: Voith-Arena; Attendance: 10,350; Referee: Alexander Sather

15 September 2018 5	Darmstadt 98	1–1	SV Sandhausen	Darmstadt
13:00	Wurtz (yellow card) 63'; Kempe 90'	Report	Linsmayer (yellow card) 38'; Klingmann 46'; Gíslason (yellow card) 71'	Stadium: Merck-Stadion am Böllenfalltor; Attendance: 15,103; Referee: Johann Pfeifer

22 September 2018 6	Dynamo Dresden	4–1	Darmstadt 98	Dresden
13:00	Koné 3', 90+1'; Đumić (yellow card) 36'; Wahlqvist (yellow card) 45'; Ebert 54'; Heise 60'	Report	Heller 18'; Holland (yellow card) 79'; Boyd (yellow card) 85'	Stadium: Stadion Dresden; Attendance: 26,530; Referee: Benedikt Kempkes

25 September 2018 7	Darmstadt 98	1–2	Arminia Bielefeld	Darmstadt
18:30	Sulu 66', (yellow card) 70'	Report	Voglsammer (yellow card) 72'; Massimo 90'; Hartherz 90+3'	Stadium: Merck-Stadion am Böllenfalltor; Attendance: 14,210; Referee: Pascal Müller

28 September 2018 8	Holstein Kiel	4–2	Darmstadt 98	Kiel
18:30	Girth 12'; Mühling 23'; Serra 32'; Dehm (yellow card) 29' (yellow-red card) 51'; Kinsombi 70'	Report	Kempe 29', 39', (yellow card) 45'; Dursun (yellow card) 56'; Mehlem (yellow card) 84'	Stadium: Holstein-Stadion; Attendance: 8,527; Referee: Timo Gerach

5 October 2018 9	Darmstadt 98	1–2	Hamburger SV	Darmstadt
18:30	Kempe (yellow card) 29'; Kamavuaka (yellow card) 47'; Dursun 89'	Summary	Hunt 13' van Drongelen (yellow card) 39'; Holtby 45'; Sakai (yellow card) 90+2'; Pollersbeck (yellow card) 90+4'	Stadium: Merck-Stadion am Böllenfalltor; Attendance: 17,400; Referee: Christian Dietz

21 October 2018 10	SSV Jahn Regensburg	1–1	Darmstadt 98	Regensburg
13:30	Nandzik (yellow card) 44'; Adamyan (yellow card) 45'; Grüttner 55'	Report	Heller (yellow card) 26'; Jones 36', (yellow card) 41'; Holland (yellow card) 65'	Stadium: Continental Arena; Attendance: 10,907; Referee: Tobias Reichel

26 October 2018 11	Darmstadt 98	2–0	SpVgg Greuther Fürth	Darmstadt
18:30	Kempe 23'; Dursun (yellow card) 60', (goal) 76'	Report	Wittek (yellow card) 62'	Stadium: Merck-Stadion am Böllenfalltor; Attendance: 14,050; Referee: René Rohde

3 November 2018 12	Darmstadt 98	3–1	1. FC Magdeburg	Darmstadt
13:00	Holland (yellow card) 13' (yellow-red card) 69'; Kempe (yellow card) 37'; Dursun 43'; Hammann 60' (o.g.); Sulu 80'	Report	Erdmann (yellow card) 37' (yellow-red card) 63'; Bülter 71'; Rother (yellow card) 83'; Müller (yellow card) 85'	Stadium: Stadion am Böllenfalltor; Attendance: 15,410; Referee: Benjamin Cortus

12 November 2018 13	VfL Bochum	1–0	Darmstadt 98	Bochum
20:30	Weilandt 62'	Report	Kempe (yellow card) 26'; Rieder (yellow card) 35'; Sulu (yellow card) 89'	Stadium: Vonovia-Ruhrstadion; Attendance: 12,022; Referee: Dr. Martin Thomsen

24 November 2018 14	Darmstadt 98	0–3	1. FC Köln	Darmstadt
13:00	Stark (yellow card) 8'; Franke (yellow card) 60'; Rieder (yellow card) 61'	Report	Höger (yellow card) 25'; Terodde 55'; Czichos 66'; Cordoba 69'	Stadium: Stadion am Böllenfalltor; Attendance: 17,000; Referee: Florian Heft

1 December 2018 15	Union Berlin	3–1	Darmstadt 98	Berlin
13:00	Andersson 28', 42'; Sulu 65' (o.g.)	Report	Sulu (yellow card) 44'; Dursun 73'	Stadium: Stadion An der Alten Försterei; Attendance: 21,474; Referee: Marco Fritz

8 December 2018 16	Darmstadt 98	1–1	FC Ingolstadt 04	Darmstadt
13:00	Kempe (yellow card) 28'; Wurtz (yellow card) 54'; Kempe 83' (pen.)	Report	Lezcano 2' (pen.); Röcher (yellow card) 48' (yellow-red card) 63'; Kittel (yellow card) 53'; Gaus (yellow card) 73'; Krauße (yellow card) 82'	Stadium: Stadion am Böllenfalltor; Attendance: 16,579; Referee: Alexander Sather

16 December 2018 17	Erzgebirge Aue	2–2	Darmstadt 98	Aue
13:30	Riese (yellow card) 14'; Testroet 50', 64'; Caucutala (yellow card) 66'; Männel (yellow card) 85'; Kalig (yellow card) 87'; Kempe (yellow card) 88'	Report	Stark (yellow card) 28'; Sulu (yellow card) 56'; Dursun (yellow card) 62'; Höhn 76'; Mehlem 78'	Stadium: Erzgebirgsstadion; Attendance: 7,400; Referee: Timo Gerach

23 December 2018 18	SC Paderborn	6–2	Darmstadt 98	Bochum
13:30	Tekpetey 16', 75', 84'; Michel 50', 77'; Gueye 88'	Report	Mehlem 32'; Jones 65'	Stadium: Benteler-Arena; Attendance: 11,547; Referee: Tobias Reichel

29 January 2019 19	Darmstadt 98	2–1	FC St Pauli	Darmstadt
20:30	Heller 81'; Dursun 89'	Report	Miyaichi 37'	Stadium: Stadion am Böllenfalltor; Attendance: 11,800; Referee: Manuel Gräfe

1 February 2019 20	MSV Duisburg	2–3	Darmstadt 98	Duisburg
18:30	Wolze 8'; Nielsen 25'; Iljutcenko 59'	Report	Bertram 73'; Moritz 88'	Stadium: Schauinsland-Reisen-Arena; Attendance: 11,213; Referee: Thorben Siewer

10 February 2019 21	Darmstadt 98	1–2	1. FC Heidenheim	Darmstadt
13:30	Palsson (yellow card) 59'; Wurtz 84'	Report	Glatzel 34' (pen.), 59'	Stadium: Stadion am Böllenfalltor; Attendance: 10,120; Referee: Michael Bacher

15 February 2019 22	SV Sandhausen	1–1	Darmstadt 98	Sandhausen
18:30	Schleusner 24'	Report	Kempe 34' (pen.)	Stadium: BWT-Stadion am Hardtwald; Attendance: 7,624; Referee: Lasse Kolowski

23 February 2019 23	Darmstadt 98	2–0	Dynamo Dresden	Darmstadt
13:00	Kempe 43' (pen.); Dursun 85'	Report		Stadium: Stadion am Böllenfalltor; Attendance: 11,330; Referee: Patrick Alt

3 March 2019 24	Arminia Bielefeld	1–0	Darmstadt 98	Bielefeld
13:30	Klos 40'	Report		Stadium: Bielefelder Alm; Attendance: 15,011; Referee: Martin Petersen

9 March 2019 25	Darmstadt 98	3–2	Holstein Kiel	Darmstadt
13:00	Mehlem 19'; Dursun 41'; Franke 62'	Report	Honsak 33'; Mühling 65'	Stadium: Stadion am Böllenfalltor; Attendance: 10,210; Referee: Benedikt Kempkes

16 March 2019 26	Hamburger SV	2–3	Darmstadt 98	Hamburg
13:00	Jatta 5'; Lasogga 16'	Report	Mehlem 52', 90+2'; Kempe 82'	Stadium: Volksparkstadion; Attendance: 54,668; Referee: Florian Badstübner

30 March 2019 27	Darmstadt 98	1–1	Jahn Regensburg	Darmstadt
13:00	Dursun 55'	Report	Geipl 69'	Stadium: Stadion am Böllenfalltor; Attendance: 10,385; Referee: Martin Thomsen

7 April 2019 28	Greuther Fürth	2–1	Darmstadt 98	Fürth
13:30	Seguin 64'; Reese 82'	Report	Wittek 94'	Stadium: Sportpark Ronhof Thomas Sommer; Attendance: 9,730; Referee: René Rohde

13 April 2019 29	1. FC Magdeburg	0–1	Darmstadt 98	Magdeburg
13:00		Report	Heller 87'	Stadium: MDCC-Arena; Attendance: 17,413; Referee: Christian Dietz

21 April 2019 30	Darmstadt 98	0–0	VfL Bochum	Darmstadt
13:30		Report		Stadium: Stadion am Böllenfalltor; Attendance: 10,590; Referee: Sven Watschitzki

26 April 2019 31	1. FC Köln	1–2	Darmstadt 98	Köln
18:30	Cordoba 66'	Report	Dursun 34'; Platte 76'	Stadium: RheinEnergieStadion; Attendance: 50,000; Referee: Marco Fritz

5 May 2019 32	Darmstadt 98	2–1	Union Berlin	Darmstadt
13:30	Stark 49'; Wittek 77'	Report	Andersson 87'	Stadium: Stadion am Böllenfalltor; Attendance: 11,510; Referee: Bastian Dankert

12 May 2019 33	FC Ingolstadt	3–0	Darmstadt 98	Ingolstadt
15:30	Kittel 21'; Lezcano 45'; Kutschke 55'	Report		Stadium: Audi-Sportpark; Attendance: 10,190; Referee: Martin Petersen

19 May 2019 34	Darmstadt 98	1–0	Erzgebirge Aue	Darmstadt
15:30	Kempe 15'			Stadium: Stadion am Böllenfalltor; Attendance: 10,570; Referee: Christian Dietz

=== DFB-Pokal ===
17 August 2018 First round	1. FC Magdeburg	0–1	Darmstadt 98	Magdeburg
20:45 CEST (UTC+02:00)		Report	Kempe 3' (pen.)	Stadium: MDCC-Arena; Attendance: 20,165; Referee: Robert Schröder

30 October 2018 Second round	Darmstadt 98	0–2	Hertha BSC	Darmstadt
18:45 (Note: The Darmstadt 98 v Hertha BSC match, originally scheduled for 18:30 CET, was delayed to 18:45 CET due to a traffic jam around the stadium.)		Report	Ibišević 64'; Mittelstädt 88'	Stadium: Merck-Stadion am Böllenfalltor; Attendance: 15,000; Referee: Robert Kampka
