= 2023–24 SV Darmstadt 98 season =

SV Darmstadt 98
2023–24 season
- President: Klaus Rüdiger Fritsch
- Head coach: Torsten Lieberknecht
- Stadium: Merck-Stadion am Böllenfalltor
- Bundesliga: 18th (relegated)
- DFB-Pokal: First round
- Top goalscorer: League: Tim Skarke (8); All: Tim Skarke (8)
- Average home league attendance: 17,730
Home colours	Away colours	Third colours

The 2023–24 season was SV Darmstadt 98's 126th season in existence and first season back in the Bundesliga. They also competed in the DFB-Pokal.

On 28 April, Darmstadt's relegation was confirmed after a home defeat against 1. FC Heidenheim, the twentieth defeat out of 31 matches.

== Players ==
=== First-team squad ===
As of 1 February 2024

Note: Flags indicate national team as defined under FIFA eligibility rules; some limited exceptions apply. Players may hold more than one non-FIFA nationality.

No.	Pos.	Nation	Player
1	GK	GER	Marcel Schuhen (3rd captain)
3	DF	SWE	Thomas Isherwood
4	DF	GER	Christoph Zimmermann
5	DF	CRO	Matej Maglica
6	MF	GER	Marvin Mehlem
7	MF	GER	Braydon Manu
8	MF	GER	Fabian Schnellhardt
9	FW	SCO	Fraser Hornby
11	MF	GER	Tobias Kempe (vice-captain)
13	GK	GER	Morten Behrens
14	DF	AUT	Christoph Klarer
15	MF	GER	Fabian Nürnberger
16	MF	GER	Andreas Müller
17	MF	GER	Julian Justvan (on loan from Hoffenheim)
18	MF	AUT	Mathias Honsak
19	DF	AUT	Emir Karić

No.	Pos.	Nation	Player
20	DF	GER	Jannik Müller
22	FW	GER	Aaron Seydel
23	MF	ALB	Klaus Gjasula
24	FW	GER	Luca Pfeiffer (on loan from Stuttgart)
25	FW	PHI	Gerrit Holtmann (on loan from Bochum)
26	DF	GER	Matthias Bader
27	FW	GER	Tim Skarke (on loan from Union Berlin)
28	MF	CRO	Bartol Franjić (on loan from Wolfsburg)
29	FW	SWE	Oscar Vilhelmsson
30	GK	GER	Alexander Brunst
32	DF	GER	Fabian Holland (captain)
38	DF	GER	Clemens Riedel
40	FW	GER	Sebastian Polter (on loan from Schalke 04)
42	FW	GER	Fabio Torsiello
45	GK	GER	Max Wendt

=== Out on loan ===
Note: Flags indicate national team as defined under FIFA eligibility rules; some limited exceptions apply. Players may hold more than one non-FIFA nationality.

No.	Pos.	Nation	Player
10	FW	SUI	Filip Stojilković (at 1. FC Kaiserslautern until 30 June 2024)
—	MF	SLE	John Peter Sesay (at Union Titus Pétange until 30 June 2024)
—	FW	GER	Henry Crosthwaite (at Hallescher FC until 30 June 2024)

== Transfers ==
=== In ===
Pos.	Player	Transferred from	Fee	Date	Source
MF	(Germany) Fabian Nürnberger	(Germany) 1. FC Nürnberg	Free	1 July 2023	
MF	(Germany) Andreas Müller	(Germany) 1. FC Magdeburg	Free	1 July 2023	
FW	(Scotland) Fraser Hornby	(France) Reims	€1,800,000	5 July 2023	
DF	(Austria) Christoph Klarer	(Germany) Fortuna Düsseldorf	€2,000,000	18 July 2023	
FW	(Germany) Luca Pfeiffer	(Germany) VfB Stuttgart	Loan	17 August 2023	
DF	(Croatia) Bartol Franjić	(Germany) VfL Wolfsburg	Loan	18 August 2023	
DF	(Germany) Tim Skarke	(Germany) Union Berlin	Loan	31 August 2023	
MF	(Germany) Julian Justvan	(Germany) TSG Hoffenheim	Loan	19 January 2024	
FW	(Philippines) Gerrit Holtmann	(Germany) VfL Bochum	Loan	21 January 2024	
FW	(Germany) Sebastian Polter	(Germany) Schalke 04	Loan	1 February 2024	

=== Out ===
Pos.	Player	Transferred to	Fee	Date	Source
DF	(Ghana) Patric Pfeiffer	(Germany) FC Augsburg	Free	1 July 2023	
MF	(France) Yassin Ben Balla	(Germany) SV Sandhausen	Free	4 July 2023	
FW	(Germany) Phillip Tietz	(Germany) FC Augsburg	€2,200,000	12 July 2023	
MF	(Austria) Nemanja Čelić	(Austria) SV Ried	Free	1 September 2023	
FW	(Switzerland) Filip Stojilković	(Germany) 1. FC Kaiserslautern	Loan	1 January 2024	

== Pre-season and friendlies ==
Win Draw Loss Fixtures

12 July 2023 Friendly	Darmstadt 98 (Germany)	0–1	(England) Norwich City	Darmstadt
18:30 UTC+2			Núñez 12'	Stadium: Merck-Stadion am Böllenfalltor; Attendance: 7,300; Referee: Marc-Philipp Eckermann

16 July 2023 Friendly	FC Gießen (Germany)	2–0	(Germany) Darmstadt 98	Gießen
16:00 UTC+2	Aigboje 61'; Akulinin 70'	Report		Stadium: Waldstadion Gießen

22 July 2023 Friendly	Karlsruher SC (Germany)	0–0	(Germany) Darmstadt 98	Karlsruhe
15:30 UTC+2				Stadium: Platz 2 Wildparkstadion

29 July 2023 Friendly	SV Sandhausen (Germany)	0–0	(Germany) Darmstadt 98	Tangermünde
15:30 UTC+2				Stadium: Stadion am Wäldchen

7 August 2023 Friendly	Liverpool (England)	3–1	(Germany) Darmstadt 98	Preston, England
19:00 UTC+1	Salah 5'; Jota 8'; Szoboszlai (yellow card) 41'; Díaz 59'	Report	Honsak 10'	Stadium: Deepdale; Attendance: 19,000; Referee: Ismail Elfath (United States)

13 October 2023 Friendly	Darmstadt 98 (Germany)	4–2	(Germany) SV Elversberg	Darmstadt
13:00 UTC+2				Stadium: Merck-Stadion am Böllenfalltor

6 January 2024 Friendly	Darmstadt 98 (Germany)	1–2	(Germany) Holstein Kiel	Oliva, Spain
13:00 UTC+1	Pfeiffer 89'	Report	Holtby 34'; Niehoff 84'	Stadium: Oliva Nova Golf & Beach Resort Campo 1

== Competitions ==
=== Overall record ===
Competition	First match	Last match	Starting round	Final position	Record							
Competition	First match	Last match	Starting round	Final position	Pld	W	D	L	GF	GA	GD	Win %
Bundesliga	20 August 2023	18 May 2024	Matchday 1	18th	34	3	8	23	30	86	−56	8.82
DFB-Pokal	14 August 2023		First round	First round	1	0	0	1	0	3	−3	0.00
Total					35	3	8	24	30	89	−59	8.57

Source: Soccerway

=== Bundesliga ===
==== League table ====
Pos	Team	Pld	W	D	L	GF	GA	GD	Pts	Qualification or relegation
14	Borussia Mönchengladbach	34	7	13	14	56	67	−11	34	
15	Union Berlin	34	9	6	19	33	58	−25	33	
16	VfL Bochum (O)	34	7	12	15	42	74	−32	33	Qualification for the relegation play-offs
17	1. FC Köln (R)	34	5	12	17	28	60	−32	27	Relegation to 2. Bundesliga
18	Darmstadt 98 (R)	34	3	8	23	30	86	−56	17	Relegation to 2. Bundesliga

Source: DFB
Rules for classification: 1) Points; 2) Goal difference; 3) Goals scored; 4) Head-to-head results; 5) Head-to-head away goals scored; 6) Away goals scored; 7) Play-off.
(O) Play-off winners; (R) Relegated

==== Results summary ====
Overall								Home						Away					
Pld	W	D	L	GF	GA	GD	Pts	W	D	L	GF	GA	GD	W	D	L	GF	GA	GD
34	3	8	23	30	86	−56	17	1	3	13	15	44	−29	2	5	10	15	42	−27

Source: DFB

==== Results by round ====
Round	1	2	3	4	5	6	7	8	9	10	11	12	13	14	15	16	17	18	19	20	21	22	23	24	25	26	27	28	29	30	31	32	33	34
Ground	A	H	A	H	A	H	A	H	A	H	H	A	H	A	H	A	H	H	A	H	A	H	A	H	A	H	A	A	H	A	H	A	H	A
Result	L	L	L	D	L	W	W	L	L	L	D	D	L	L	L	D	L	D	L	L	D	L	D	L	L	L	D	L	L	W	L	L	L	L
Position	13	17	18	17	17	15	11	12	14	15	15	15	16	18	18	18	18	18	18	18	18	18	18	18	18	18	18	18	18	18	18	18	18	18

Source: DFB
A = Away; H = Home; W = Win; D = Draw; L = Loss

==== Matches ====
The league fixtures were unveiled on 30 June 2023.

20 August 2023 1	Eintracht Frankfurt	1–0	Darmstadt 98	Frankfurt
17:30 CEST (UTC+2)	Kolo Muani 40'; Jakić (yellow card) 59'; Koch (yellow card) 90+6'	Report	Klarer (yellow card) 37'; Mehlem (yellow card) 45+1'; Maglica (yellow card) 74'	Stadium: Deutsche Bank Park; Attendance: 54,000; Referee: Harm Osmers

26 August 2023 2	Darmstadt 98	1–4	Union Berlin	Darmstadt
15:30 CEST (UTC+2)	Mehlem 24', (yellow card) 34'; Manu (yellow card) 44'	Report	Gosens 4', 34'; Aaronson (yellow card) 5' (yellow-red card) 21'; Behrens 39'; Doekhi 65'	Stadium: Merck-Stadion am Böllenfalltor; Attendance: 17,810; Referee: Patrick Ittrich

2 September 2023 3	Bayer Leverkusen	5–1	Darmstadt 98	Leverkusen
15:30 CEST (UTC+2)	Boniface 21', 61'; Tah (yellow card) 24'; Palacios (yellow card) 27', (goal) 49'; Xhaka (yellow card) 31'; Hofmann 67'; Hložek 83'	Report	Vilhelmsson 25', (yellow card) 53'; Klarer (yellow card) 80'	Stadium: BayArena; Attendance: 29,653; Referee: Sven Jablonski

17 September 2023 4	Darmstadt 98	3–3	Borussia Mönchengladbach	Darmstadt
17:30 CEST (UTC+2)	Mehlem 8'; Maglica 10', (red card) 49'; Skarke 33'; Schuhen (yellow card) 64'	Report	Itakura (yellow card) 33'; Čvančara (penalty missed) 50', 77'; Pefok 56'; Neuhaus 73'	Stadium: Merck-Stadion am Böllenfalltor; Attendance: 17,810; Referee: Timo Gerach

22 September 2023 5	VfB Stuttgart	3–1	Darmstadt 98	Stuttgart
20:30 CEST (UTC+2)	Millot 23'; Guirassy 32', 90+3'; Undav (yellow card) 90'	Report	Pfeiffer (yellow card) 8'; Zagadou 17' (o.g.); Holland (yellow card) 45+1'; Riedel (yellow card) 62'; Skarke (yellow card) 71'; Stojilković (yellow card) 77'; Schnellhardt (yellow card) 86'	Stadium: MHPArena; Attendance: 54,000; Referee: Matthias Jöllenbeck

1 October 2023 6	Darmstadt 98	4–2	Werder Bremen	Darmstadt
15:30 CEST (UTC+2)	Bader 5'; Skarke 25'; Mehlem (yellow card) 40', (goal) 50'; Holland (yellow card) 52'; Kempe 62' (pen.); Franjić (yellow card) 90+4'	Report	Lynen (yellow card) 31'; Deman 70', (yellow card) 90+3'; Veljković 79'	Stadium: Merck-Stadion am Böllenfalltor; Attendance: 17,810; Referee: Martin Petersen

7 October 2023 7	FC Augsburg	1–2	Darmstadt 98	Augsburg
15:30 CEST (UTC+2)	Gumny (yellow card) 35'; Michel (yellow card) 66'; Demirović (yellow card) 74', (goal) 86'; Uduokhai (yellow card) 90+4'	Report	Müller (yellow card) 38'; Skarke 52'; Pfeiffer (yellow card) 59'; Kempe 70' (pen.)	Stadium: Augsburg Arena; Attendance: 29,200; Referee: Deniz Aytekin

21 October 2023 8	Darmstadt 98	1–3	RB Leipzig	Darmstadt
15:30 CEST (UTC+2)	Kempe 32' (pen.); Holland (yellow card) 47'; Klarer (yellow card) 49'; Nürnberger (yellow card) 60'; Skarke (yellow card) 67'; Maglica (yellow card) 68'; Müller (yellow card) 71'	Report	Openda 1', 72', (yellow card) 68'; Forsberg 24'; Raum (yellow card) 63'; Kampl (yellow card) 79'	Stadium: Merck-Stadion am Böllenfalltor; Attendance: 17,810; Referee: Harm Osmers

28 October 2023 9	Bayern Munich	8–0	Darmstadt 98	Munich
15:30 CEST (UTC+2)	Kimmich (red card) 4'; De Ligt (yellow card) 38'; Kane 51', 69', 88'; Sané 56', 64'; Musiala 60', 76'; Müller 71'	Report	Gjasula (red card) 21'; Maglica (red card) 41'; Bader (yellow card) 49'; Nürnberger (yellow card) 69'	Stadium: Allianz Arena; Attendance: 75,000; Referee: Martin Petersen

3 November 2023 10	Darmstadt 98	1–2	VfL Bochum	Darmstadt
20:30 CET (UTC+1)	Nürnberger 43'; Klarer (yellow card) 67'; Holland (red card) 70'; Skarke (yellow card) 90+4'	Report	Asano 25', 54'; Losilla (yellow card) 42'; Gamboa (yellow card) 67'; Schlotterbeck (yellow card) 68'; Kwarteng (yellow card) 87'; Paciência (yellow card) 90+4'	Stadium: Merck-Stadion am Böllenfalltor; Attendance: 17,810; Referee: Marco Fritz

11 November 2023 11	Darmstadt 98	0–0	Mainz 05	Darmstadt
15:30 CET (UTC+1)	Klarer (yellow card) 69'; Hornby (yellow card) 73'; Franjić (yellow card) 90+1'	Report	Van den Berg (yellow card) 35'; Zentner (yellow card) 57'; Kohr (yellow card) 59'	Stadium: Merck-Stadion am Böllenfalltor; Attendance: 17,810; Referee: Daniel Siebert

25 November 2023 12	SC Freiburg	1–1	Darmstadt 98	Freiburg
15:30 CET (UTC+1)	Höler 35'; Weißhaupt (yellow card) 75'; Höfler (yellow card) 90+4'	Report	Honsak 18'	Stadium: Europa-Park Stadion; Attendance: 34,300; Referee: Sascha Stegemann

1 December 2023 13	Darmstadt 98	0–1	1. FC Köln	Darmstadt
20:30 CET (UTC+1)	Seydel (yellow card) 64'	Report	Kainz (yellow card) 18'; Selke 60', (yellow card) 71'; Hübers (yellow card) 68'	Stadium: Merck-Stadion am Böllenfalltor; Attendance: 17,810; Referee: Patrick Ittrich

9 December 2023 14	1. FC Heidenheim	3–2	Darmstadt 98	Heidenheim
20:30 CET (UTC+1)	Schöppner 42'; Kleindienst (yellow card) 55'; Dinkçi (yellow card) 63'; Mainka 69', 71'	Report	Skarke 52'; Maloney 60' (o.g.); Müller (yellow card) 62'; Karić (yellow card) 82'	Stadium: Voith-Arena; Attendance: 15,000; Referee: Daniel Schlager

16 December 2023 15	Darmstadt 98	0–1	VfL Wolfsburg	Darmstadt
15:30 CET (UTC+1)	Honsak (yellow card) 69'; Gjasula (yellow card) 90+6'	Report	Lacroix (red card) 27'; Majer 63'	Stadium: Merck-Stadion am Böllenfalltor; Attendance: 16,900; Referee: Robert Hartmann

19 December 2023 16	1899 Hoffenheim	3–3	Darmstadt 98	Sinsheim
20:30 CET (UTC+1)	Kramarić 14' (pen.); Bebou 28', 66', (yellow card) 72'; Skov (yellow card) 49'	Report	Gjasula (yellow card) 13'; Pfeiffer 23', (yellow card) 59'; Skarke 57', 85', (yellow card) 75'; Riedel (yellow card) 81'	Stadium: Rhein-Neckar-Arena; Attendance: 18,125; Referee: Frank Willenborg

13 January 2024 17	Darmstadt 98	0–3	Borussia Dortmund	Darmstadt
18:30 CET (UTC+1)	Maglica (yellow card) 51'	Report	Bynoe-Gittens (yellow card) 3'; Brandt 24'; Maatsen (yellow card) 31'; Reus 77'; Reyna (yellow card) 90'; Moukoko 90+2'	Stadium: Merck-Stadion am Böllenfalltor; Attendance: 17,810; Referee: Deniz Aytekin

20 January 2024 18	Darmstadt 98	2–2	Eintracht Frankfurt	Darmstadt
15:30 CET (UTC+1)	Maglica (yellow card) 20'; Justvan 61'; Vilhelmsson 90+5'	Report	Nkounkou 33'; Knauff 51'; Buta (yellow card) 68'	Stadium: Merck-Stadion am Böllenfalltor; Attendance: 17,750; Referee: Daniel Siebert

28 January 2024 19	Union Berlin	1–0	Darmstadt 98	Berlin
15:30 CET (UTC+1)	Hollerbach 62'; Trimmel (yellow card) 77'; Vogt (yellow card) 81'; Schäfer (yellow card) 83'	Report	Zimmermann (yellow card) 75'; Gjasula (yellow card) 83'	Stadium: Stadion An der Alten Försterei; Attendance: 21,786; Referee: Harm Osmers

3 February 2024 20	Darmstadt 98	0–2	Bayer Leverkusen	Darmstadt
15:30 CET (UTC+1)	Zimmermann (yellow card) 49'; Franjić (yellow card) 68'	Report	Andrich (yellow card) 7'; Tella 33', 52'; Hložek (yellow card) 74'	Stadium: Merck-Stadion am Böllenfalltor; Attendance: 17,810; Referee: Tobias Reichel

10 February 2024 21	Borussia Mönchengladbach	0–0	Darmstadt 98	Mönchengladbach
15:30 CET (UTC+1)		Report	Zimmermann (yellow card) 56'; Skarke (yellow card) 65'; Schuhen (yellow card) 75'; Müller (yellow card) 82'; Maglica (yellow card) 90+2'	Stadium: Borussia-Park; Attendance: 46,121; Referee: Sascha Stegemann

17 February 2024 22	Darmstadt 98	1–2	VfB Stuttgart	Darmstadt
15:30 CET (UTC+1)	Klarer (yellow card) 45+14'; Zimmermann (yellow card) 67'; Brunst (yellow card) 69'; Justvan (yellow card) 90'; Seydel 90+5'	Report	Guirassy 14'; Stenzel (yellow card) 45+13' (yellow-red card) 45+22'; Leweling (yellow card) 45+24'; Führich (yellow card) 67'; Karazor (yellow card) 71'; Dahoud 90+2'	Stadium: Merck-Stadion am Böllenfalltor; Attendance: 17,810; Referee: Tobias Welz

24 February 2024 23	Werder Bremen	1–1	Darmstadt 98	Bremen
13:30 CET (UTC+1)	Zimmerman 8' (o.g.); Ducksch (yellow card) 20'; Lynen (yellow card) 35'; Jung (yellow card) 38'	Report	Justvan 33'; Holland (yellow card) 52'; Gjasula (yellow card) 56'; Maglica (yellow card) 67'; Karić (yellow card) 89'	Stadium: Weserstadion; Attendance: 42,358; Referee: Florian Badstübner

2 March 2024 24	Darmstadt 98	0–6	FC Augsburg	Darmstadt
15:30 CET (UTC+1)	Müller (yellow card) 17'; Karić (yellow card) 45+1'	Report	Tietz 2', 84'; Jensen 12'; Demirović 20', 29'; Vargas 25'	Stadium: Merck-Stadion am Böllenfalltor; Attendance: 17,810; Referee: Felix Zwayer

9 March 2024 25	RB Leipzig	2–0	Darmstadt 98	Leipzig
15:30 CET (UTC+1)	Isherwood 3' (o.g.); Baumgartner 50'	Report	Müller (yellow card) 7'; Klarer (yellow card) 44'; Franjić (yellow card) 67'	Stadium: Red Bull Arena; Attendance: 40,000; Referee: Robert Hartmann

16 March 2024 26	Darmstadt 98	2–5	Bayern Munich	Darmstadt
15:30 CET (UTC+1)	Skarke 28'; Franjić (yellow card) 67'; Vilhelmsson 90+5'	Report	Musiala 36', 64'; Kane 45+1'; Gnabry 74'; Tel 90+3'	Stadium: Merck-Stadion am Böllenfalltor; Attendance: 17,810; Referee: Tobias Reichel

31 March 2024 27	VfL Bochum	2–2	Darmstadt 98	Bochum
19:30 CEST (UTC+2)	Mašović (yellow card) 8'; Hofmann 30', 48'; Losilla (yellow card) 53'	Report	Klarer (yellow card) 53'; Skarke 62'; Vilhelmsson 76'; Gjasula (yellow card) 85'	Stadium: Vonovia Ruhrstadion; Attendance: 25,023; Referee: Sven Jablonski

6 April 2024 28	Mainz 05	4–0	Darmstadt 98	Mainz
15:30 CEST (UTC+2)	Hanche-Olsen 33'; Kohr (yellow card) 51'; Gruda 60', (yellow card) 75'; Lee 80', 84'	Report	Lieberknecht (yellow card) 35'; Skarke (yellow card) 51'; Brunst-Zöllner (yellow card) 56'	Stadium: Mewa Arena; Attendance: 33,000; Referee: Daniel Schlager

14 April 2024 29	Darmstadt 98	0–1	SC Freiburg	Darmstadt
15:30 CEST (UTC+2)		Report	Sallai (yellow card) 4'; Dōan 36'	Stadium: Merck-Stadion am Böllenfalltor; Attendance: 17,810; Referee: Sascha Stegemann

20 April 2024 30	1. FC Köln	0–2	Darmstadt 98	Cologne
15:30 CEST (UTC+2)		Report	Klarer 57'; Holtmann (yellow card) 88'; Vilhelmsson 90+1'	Stadium: RheinEnergieStadion; Attendance: 50,000; Referee: Matthias Jöllenbeck

28 April 2024 31	Darmstadt 98	0–1	1. FC Heidenheim	Darmstadt
19:30 CEST (UTC+2)	Karić (yellow card) 52'; Kempe (yellow card) 60'	Report	Gimber (yellow card) 43'; Dovedan 90+1'	Stadium: Merck-Stadion am Böllenfalltor; Attendance: 17,416; Referee: Bastian Dankert

4 May 2024 32	VfL Wolfsburg	3–0	Darmstadt 98	Wolfsburg
15:30 CEST (UTC+2)	Wimmer 8'; Wind 11'; Černý 90+3'	Report	Müller (yellow card) 7'; Maglica (yellow card) 32'; Zimmermann (yellow card) 90+1'	Stadium: Volkswagen Arena; Attendance: 23,108; Referee: Robert Hartmann

12 May 2024 33	Darmstadt 98	0–6	1899 Hoffenheim	Darmstadt
15:30 CEST (UTC+2)	Müller (yellow card) 53'; Skarke (yellow card) 68'; Gjasula (yellow card) 75'	Report	Bebou 2', 51'; Beier 6', 44'; Kadeřábek 22'; Kabak 26'	Stadium: Merck-Stadion am Böllenfalltor; Attendance: 17,810; Referee: Florian Badstübner

18 May 2024 34	Borussia Dortmund	4–0	Darmstadt 98	Dortmund
15:30 CEST (UTC+2)	Maatsen 30'; Reus 38'; Brandt 72'; Malen 88'	Report	Klarer (yellow card) 7'; Gjasula (yellow card) 45'; Vilhelmsson (yellow card) 59'	Stadium: Signal Iduna Park; Attendance: 81,365; Referee: Daniel Siebert

=== DFB-Pokal ===
14 August 2023 First round	FC 08 Homburg	3–0	Darmstadt 98	Homburg
18:00 CEST (UTC+2)	Mendler 10'; Lippert (yellow card) 39'; Heilig 49'; Harres 81'; Kretzschmar (yellow card) 88'; Dombrowka (yellow card) 90+5'	Report	Zimmermann (yellow card) 30'; Holland (yellow card) 49'; Riedel (yellow card) 79'; Stojilković (penalty missed) 88'	Stadium: Waldstadion Homburg; Attendance: 12,000; Referee: Daniel Schlager

== Statistics ==
=== Goalscorers ===
As of 24 February 2023

Rank	No.	Pos.	Nat.	Player	Bundesliga	DFB-Pokal	Total
1	27	MF	(Germany)	Tim Skarke	6	0	6
2	6	MF	(Germany)	Marvin Mehlem	3	0	3
2	11	MF	(Germany)	Tobias Kempe	3	0	3
4	29	FW	(Sweden)	Oscar Vilhelmsson	2	0	2
4	17	MF	(Germany)	Julian Justvan	2	0	2
6	15	MF	(Germany)	Fabian Nürnberger	1	0	1
6	26	DF	(Germany)	Matthias Bader	1	0	1
6	24	FW	(Germany)	Lukas Pfeiffer	1	0	1
6	5	DF	(Croatia)	Matej Maglica	1	0	1
6	18	MF	(Austria)	Mathias Honsak	1	0	1
6	22	FW	(Germany)	Aaron Seydel	1	0	1
Own goals					2	0	2
Totals					24	0	24
