= Fabio Torsiello =

German footballer

Personal information
- Date of birth: 2 February 2005 (age 21)
- Place of birth: Darmstadt, Germany
- Height: 1.69 m (5 ft 7 in)
- Position: Forward

Team information
- Current team: Alemannia Aachen (on loan from Darmstadt 98)
- Number: 17

Youth career
- 2013–2015: Mainz 05
- 2015–2023: Darmstadt 98

Senior career*
Years	Team	Apps	(Gls)
2022–	Darmstadt 98	14	(0)
2024–	Darmstadt 98 II	17	(5)
2025	→ SpVgg Unterhaching (loan)	17	(3)
2025–	→ Alemannia Aachen (loan)	8	(0)

International career^{‡}
2022–2023	Germany U18	6	(0)
2024	Germany U19	1	(1)
- * Club domestic league appearances and goals as of 28 May 2026 ‡ National team caps and goals as of 22 May 2024

Fabio Torsiello (born 2 February 2005) is a German professional footballer who plays as a forward for 3. Liga club Alemannia Aachen, on loan from Darmstadt 98.

== Club career ==
Torsiello is a youth product of Mainz 05 and Darmstadt 98. He made his professional debut with Darmstadt 98 in a 3–0 DFB Pokal win over FC Ingolstadt 04 on 1 August 2022. On 6 December 2022, he signed his first professional contract with Darmstadt 98.

On 23 January 2025, Torsiello was loaned by SpVgg Unterhaching in 3. Liga.

On 27 May 2025, Torsiello moved on a new loan to Alemannia Aachen, also in 3. Liga. On 16 June 2026, the loan was extended for the 2026–27 season.

== International career ==
Born in Germany, Torsiello is of Italian descent. He is a youth international for Germany, having played for the Germany U18s.

== Career statistics ==
As of match played on 18 May 2024

Appearances and goals by club, season and competition
Club	Season	League			Cup		Other		Total	
Club	Season	Division	Apps	Goals	Apps	Goals	Apps	Goals	Apps	Goals
Darmstadt 98	2022–23	2. Bundesliga	4	0	2	0	—		6	0
Darmstadt 98	2023–24	Bundesliga	10	0	0	0	—		10	0
Darmstadt 98	2024–25	2. Bundesliga	0	0	0	0	—		0	0
Career total			14	0	2	0	0	0	16	0
