= Klaus Gjasula =

Albanian footballer

Personal information
- Full name: Klaus Fatmir Gjasula
- Date of birth: 14 December 1989 (age 36)
- Place of birth: Tirana, Albania
- Height: 1.92 m (6 ft 4 in)
- Position: Defensive midfielder

Team information
- Current team: TSG Hoffenheim II
- Number: 5

Youth career
- PSV Freiburg
- –2007: Offenburger FV
- 2008: Freiburger FC

Senior career*
Years	Team	Apps	(Gls)
2008–2009	Freiburger FC		
2009–2010	Bahlinger SC	25	(2)
2010–2012	Waldhof Mannheim	50	(3)
2012–2013	MSV Duisburg II	23	(0)
2013–2016	Kickers Offenbach	77	(4)
2016	Stuttgarter Kickers	16	(0)
2016–2018	Hallescher FC	53	(6)
2018–2020	SC Paderborn	53	(3)
2020–2021	Hamburger SV	15	(0)
2021–2025	Darmstadt 98	66	(1)
2025–2026	Rot-Weiss Essen	44	(1)
2026–	TSG Hoffenheim II	0	(0)

International career^{‡}
2019–2024	Albania	29	(1)
- * Club domestic league appearances and goals as of 20 May 2026 ‡ National team caps and goals as of 19 June 2024

Klaus Fatmir Gjasula (Albanian pronunciation: [ˈkla.us ɟaˈsula]; born 14 December 1989) is an Albanian professional footballer who plays as a defensive midfielder for German 3. Liga club TSG Hoffenheim II.

Gjasula began his senior career in the lower tiers of German football, playing for several Oberliga and Regionalliga clubs before making his professional debut with Stuttgarter Kickers in the 3. Liga in 2016. He went on to establish himself as a regular starter with Hallescher FC and later joined SC Paderborn, where he helped the team achieve promotion to the Bundesliga, making his top-flight debut in 2019. During that season, he set a league record for most yellow cards (17) and became known for wearing a protective headband. Subsequently, he played for Hamburger SV and Darmstadt 98, where he occasionally captained the team and contributed to their promotion to the Bundesliga in 2023, before joining Rot-Weiss Essen in 2025.

He represented the Albania national football team between 2019 and 2024, earning 29 caps, mostly as a starter, and appearing at UEFA Euro 2024, where he scored both an own goal and a goal to earn Albania a 2–2 draw against Croatia, their only point of the tournament.

== Early life ==
Gjasula was born in Tirana, Albania, and moved with his family to Freiburg, Germany, shortly after his birth. His given name, Klaus, was inspired by the German actor Klausjürgen Wussow, who portrayed Professor Klaus Brinkmann in the popular 1980s television series The Black Forest Clinic (Die Schwarzwaldklinik). Gjasula's grandmother was a devoted fan of the show, and his brother was named Jürgen after the same actor. Growing up in the Breisgau region, Gjasula took his first steps in football with several local clubs, including PSV Freiburg, Offenburger FV and Freiburger FC.

== Club career ==
=== Early career ===
During the 2009–10 Oberliga Baden-Württemberg season, Gjasula played for Bahlinger SC, making 27 appearances and scoring 3 goals.

He then moved to fellow Oberliga Baden-Württemberg side Waldhof Mannheim, where in his first season he made 26 appearances and scored 2 goals, helping the team win the league and gain promotion to the Regionalliga Süd. During the 2011–12 Regionalliga season, he made 24 appearances and scored once.

Gjasula continued playing in the fourth tier, joining MSV Duisburg II in the Regionalliga West, where he made 23 appearances.

He then moved to Kickers Offenbach in the Regionalliga Südwest. In his first season, he made 27 appearances and scored 2 goals. In the following 2014–15 Regionalliga season, he made his debut in the DFB-Pokal and recorded 31 league appearances, helping the team win the league title, although they failed to achieve promotion after losing the play-off to 1. FC Magdeburg.

During the 2015–16 Regionalliga season, Gjasula made 17 appearances and scored 2 goals in the first half of the campaign, before moving to Stuttgarter Kickers in the 3. Liga.

=== Stuttgarter Kickers ===
In January 2016, Gjasula signed for Stuttgarter Kickers in the 3. Liga, marking his transition to professional football. He made his professional debut on 23 January 2016 in a 2–2 home draw against FC Erzgebirge Aue, playing the full 90 minutes and providing one assist.

During the second half of the 2015–16 season, Gjasula went on to make 18 league appearances, scoring one goal and providing four assists in total, but the club suffered relegation to the Regionalliga at the end of the campaign.

Despite the setback, his performances drew attention for his composure and passing range as a defensive midfielder, which earned him a move to Hallescher FC the following summer.

=== Hallescher FC ===
In June 2016, Gjasula joined Hallescher FC, signing a two-year contract and remaining in the 3. Liga.

He quickly established himself as a key player in defensive midfield and became known for his leadership and tactical discipline. In his first season (2016–17), he made 30 league appearances, scoring three goals, and helped the team secure a comfortable mid-table finish.

In the summer of 2017, he suffered a metatarsal fracture and missed the first ten matches of the 2017–18 season. Upon his return, he was named team captain, adding three goals in 23 appearances.

=== Paderborn ===
In June 2018, Gjasula signed with SC Paderborn, who had just been promoted to the 2. Bundesliga. He made his league debut on 10 August 2018, scoring with a header in the 31st minute of a 2–0 home win against SSV Jahn Regensburg. Throughout the 2018–19 season, Gjasula established himself as a key figure in defensive midfield, known for his physical play and leadership. He played a crucial role as Paderborn achieved a second consecutive promotion, returning to the Bundesliga after finishing second in the league.

Gjasula made his Bundesliga debut on 17 August 2019 in a 3–2 away defeat to Bayer Leverkusen, playing the full match.

During the 2019–20 season, he remained an undisputed starter in defensive midfield, noted for his strong tackling, positional discipline, and leadership qualities. He made 28 league appearances and scored twice.

Despite Paderborn's relegation at the end of the campaign, Gjasula's performances were regarded as consistent and hard-working. Over the course of the season, he received 17 yellow cards, setting a new Bundesliga record for the most cautions in a single season, surpassing the previous record of 16 held by former Eintracht Frankfurt defender Tomasz Hajto.

During his time at Paderborn, Gjasula frequently wore protective headgear — a precaution he adopted after suffering a fractured cheekbone (Jochbogen) in 2013 — and he has publicly suggested that helmets should be considered for professional footballers.

=== Hamburger ===
Ahead of the 2020–21 season, Gjasula joined Hamburger SV, signing a two-year contract until June 2022. Under new head coach Daniel Thioune, he started the first two league matches of the season in a 4–2–3–1 formation alongside Amadou Onana in defensive midfield. In the second league match, a 4–3 win over his former club Paderborn, Gjasula was involved in two conceded goals following individual errors. In the following weeks, he appeared mostly as a substitute. On 25 October 2020, Gjasula came on as a late substitute in a 3–1 win over Würzburger Kickers, where he assisted the final goal after a long sprint in stoppage time. After a run of four winless matches between November and December, Gjasula returned to the starting line-up, and Hamburg subsequently recorded three consecutive victories. He then suffered a torn inner ligament in his left knee during training at the turn of the year. The injury sidelined him for 11 matches. He made his comeback on 12 March 2021, coming on as a late substitute in the 90th minute of a 2–0 away win over VfL Bochum. He played only a few matches afterwards, finishing the season with 16 league appearances, as Hamburg placed fourth in the table, four points below the promotion play-off spot.

At the end of the season, Gjasula left Hamburg after his contract was mutually terminated.

Shortly afterwards, he signed with SV Darmstadt 98 on a free transfer, joining the club ahead of the 2021–22 season.

=== Darmstadt ===
Gjasula made his debut for Darmstadt 98 on 14 August 2021 against Ingolstadt 04, providing an assist in a 6–1 home victory. He went on to make 23 league appearances during the campaign, helping Darmstadt finish in fourth place — matching his previous season's record with Hamburg.

==== 2022–23 season ====
In the following 2022–23 season, Gjasula began as an undisputed starter for Darmstadt 98, featuring regularly in a new role for him as a centre-back. He played nearly every match during the opening months, contributing to the team's strong start and a nine-match unbeaten run.

In late September 2022, he suffered a torn muscle bundle combined with adductor pain, which caused him to miss 12 matches in process. Despite his absence, Darmstadt continued their unbeaten streak. During his injury recovery period, Gjasula extended his contract with Darmstadt for one additional year, until June 2024, following the club's initiative to retain his experience and leadership within the squad. Gjasula returned to action in March 2023, at a time when the team was experiencing a slight dip in form, and initially appeared only as a substitute. He regained full match fitness towards the end of the season, completing the full 90 minutes in the final two matches, including a decisive 1–0 victory against 1. FC Magdeburg in the penultimate round, which mathematically secured Darmstadt's promotion to the Bundesliga.

Darmstadt ended the campaign with 67 points, level with Heidenheim, but placed second on head-to-head record, securing automatic promotion to the Bundesliga for the 2023–24 season.

==== 2023–24 season ====
In his second Bundesliga season, Gjasula was once again deployed as a centre-back. After not featuring in the opening rounds, he returned to the lineup on 1 October 2023, in matchday 6, contributing to a 4–2 home win over SV Werder Bremen — Darmstadt's first league victory of the season. On 28 October 2023, in an away match against FC Bayern Munich, Gjasula started again in central defence but was sent off in the 21st minute following a VAR review for a last-man foul, leaving Darmstadt with ten men. Earlier, Bayern's Joshua Kimmich had also been dismissed, while Gjasula's teammate Matej Maglica was later shown a red card as well, reducing Darmstadt to nine players. Bayern went on to score all eight goals in the second half, with the match ending in an 8–0 defeat for Darmstadt.

In the remainder of the season, Gjasula alternated between starting and substitute roles as Darmstadt continued their poor run of results, failing to win a match until matchday 30, when they defeated 1. FC Köln 2–0. The team then ended the campaign with four straight losses without scoring, conceding 14 goals in total, and finished bottom of the table with just 17 points from 34 matches, resulting in relegation from the Bundesliga. Gjasula had registered 22 appearances in total.

==== 2024–25 season ====
On 12 May 2024, Darmstadt announced that Gjasula, along with several other players, would leave the club at the end of the season. However, two months later, in July 2024, Gjasula signed a new contract with Darmstadt after the club was impressed by his performances with the Albania national football team at UEFA Euro 2024, where he scored a goal during the tournament.

Despite the club's relegation, Gjasula chose to remain with Darmstadt out of loyalty, and was rewarded by being named team captain ahead of the 2024–25 season. He led the team onto the field wearing the captain's armband in the opening matches of the campaign.

However, during the whole first half of the 2024–25 season, Gjasula found himself often relegated to the bench and seeing limited playing time. According to reports, Gjasula had grown increasingly frustrated with limited playing time after the team's relegation. He publicly expressed a desire for more minutes, which Darmstadt could not promise considering the squad rotation.

=== Rot-Weiss Essen ===
After the lack of regular playtime at Darmstadt, Gjasula moved to Rot-Weiss Essen on 6 January 2025, joining the club in the 3. Liga.

He made his debut on 26 January 2025 in a 3. Liga match against Hannover 96 II, starting in central midfield and contributing defensively throughout the match as Essen won 5–1. During the game, he won several duels and earned a key free kick in the attacking half.

In the remainder of the 2024–25 season, Gjasula established himself as a rotational starter, appearing in 17 league matches and providing experience in both defensive midfield and centre-back roles, receiving a record of 10 yellow cards. Rot-Weiss Essen finished 8th with 56 points.

During the same season, he also made two appearances in the Lower Rhine Cup (Landespokal Niederrhein), helping Rot-Weiss Essen win the regional title and qualify for the following season's DFB-Pokal.

In the following 2025–26 campaign, he retained his starting role under coach Uwe Koschinat, completing most matches as a full 90-minute player.

On 27 September 2025, during matchday 8 away against SV Waldhof Mannheim, Gjasula was sent off at score 2–0 after receiving a second yellow card for a challenge on Kennedy Okpala, reducing Essen to ten men. The match ended in a heavy 6–1 defeat. Following the match, Gjasula publicly criticized the referee's decision, leading the DFB to issue him both a fine and a three-match suspension.

=== TSG Hoffenheim II ===
On 11 June 2026, Gjasula joined 3. Liga side TSG Hoffenheim II, the reserve team of TSG Hoffenheim.

== International career ==
Gjasula made his Albania national team debut under coach Edoardo Reja on 7 September 2019 in a UEFA Euro 2020 qualifier against France, replacing Ylber Ramadani in the 53rd minute and receiving a yellow card later in the match. He quickly established himself as a regular starter ahead of Ramadani, completing all remaining fixtures of the qualification campaign. Gjasula remained a key part of the squad during the subsequent editions of the UEFA Nations League and the 2022 FIFA World Cup qualifiers.

Under new coach Sylvinho, he continued to feature regularly throughout the UEFA Euro 2024 qualifiers. However, a torn muscle injury and the rise of Kristjan Asllani saw him lose his starting role, finishing the campaign with five appearances. Albania topped their group for the first time in history with 15 points—level with the Czech Republic but ahead on head-to-head record—securing qualification for their second-ever European Championship finals. On 8 June 2024, Gjasula was named in Albania's final UEFA Euro 2024 squad. During the group stage match against Croatia on 19 June, Gjasula came on as a second-half substitute. In the 76th minute, he inadvertently scored an own goal that gave Croatia a 2–1 lead, but in stoppage time he equalised with his first international goal to secure a 2–2 draw for Albania. He also received a yellow card during the match. By doing so, he became the first substitute in UEFA European Championship history to score both a goal and an own goal in the same match, and only the second player overall after Anton Ondruš.

On 28 August 2024, Gjasula announced his retirement from international football, ending his national team career with 29 caps and one goal.

== Personal life ==
Gjasula was born in the capital of Albania, Tirana and raised in Freiburg, Germany. He holds both Albanian and German citizenship. His older brother Jürgen Gjasula is a footballer who plays as an attacking midfielder.

Gjasula was selected as one of two ambassadors by the Albanian Football Association for the 2025 UEFA European Under-17 Championship finals, to be held in Albania. As part of his role, he participated in promotional activities, including a training session and open meeting with young players at the “Elite Youth Development Academy”, encouraging discipline, tactical understanding, and motivation.

== Career statistics ==
=== Club ===
As of match played 19 December 2025

Appearances and goals by club, season and competition
Club	Season	League			National Cup		League Cup		Other		Total	
Club	Season	Division	Apps	Goals	Apps	Goals	Apps	Goals	Apps	Goals	Apps	Goals
Waldhof Mannheim	2011–12	Regionalliga Süd	25	1	0	0	0	0	0	0	25	1
MSV Duisburg II	2012–13	Regionalliga West	23	0	0	0	0	0	0	0	23	0
Kickers Offenbach	2013–14	Regionalliga Südwest	27	2	0	0	0	0	0	0	27	2
Kickers Offenbach	2014–15	Regionalliga Südwest	33	0	3	0	0	0	0	0	36	0
Kickers Offenbach	2015–16	Regionalliga Südwest	17	2	0	0	—		0	0	17	2
Kickers Offenbach	Total		77	4	3	0	—		0	0	80	4
Stuttgarter Kickers	2015–16	3. Liga	16	0	0	0	—		0	0	16	0
Hallescher FC	2016–17	3. Liga	30	3	2	1	—		0	0	32	4
Hallescher FC	2017–18	3. Liga	23	3	0	0	—		0	0	23	3
Hallescher FC	Total		53	6	2	1	—		0	0	55	7
SC Paderborn	2018–19	2. Bundesliga	24	1	3	0	—		0	0	27	1
SC Paderborn	2019–20	Bundesliga	29	2	2	0	—		0	0	31	2
SC Paderborn	Total		53	3	5	0	—		0	0	58	3
Hamburger SV	2020–21	2. Bundesliga	15	0	1	0	—		—		16	0
Hamburger SV	2021–22	2. Bundesliga	0	0	0	0	—		—		0	0
Hamburger SV	Total		15	0	1	0	—		0	0	16	0
Darmstadt	2021–22	2. Bundesliga	23	1	0	0	—		—		23	1
Darmstadt	2022–23	2. Bundesliga	17	0	1	0	—		—		18	0
Darmstadt	2023–24	Bundesliga	22	0	0	0	—		—		22	0
Darmstadt	2024–25	Bundesliga	4	0	0	0	—		—		4	0
Darmstadt	Total		66	1	1	0	—		—		67	1
Rot-Weiss Essen	2024–25	3. Liga	17	0	2	1	—		—		19	1
Rot-Weiss Essen	2025–26	3. Liga	7	0	2	0	—		—		9	0
Rot-Weiss Essen	Total		30	0	4	1	—		—		34	1
Career total			358	14	16	2	0	0	0	0	374	16

=== International ===
As of 19 June 2024

Appearances and goals by national team and year
National team	Year	Apps	Goals
Albania	2019	5	0
Albania	2020	4	0
Albania	2021	6	0
Albania	2022	6	0
Albania	2023	6	0
Albania	2024	2	1
Total		29	1

As of match played 19 June 2024
Scores and results list Albania's goal tally first.

List of international goals scored by Klaus Gjasula
No.	Date	Venue	Cap	Opponent	Score	Result	Competition
1	19 June 2024	Volksparkstadion, Hamburg, Germany	29	Croatia	2–2	2–2	UEFA Euro 2024
