= 2014–15 SV Darmstadt 98 season =

SV Darmstadt 98
2014–15 season
- Chairman: Klaus Rüdiger Fritsch
- Manager: Dirk Schuster
- Stadium: Stadion am Böllenfalltor
- 2. Bundesliga: 2nd
- DFB-Pokal: Eliminated First Round (vs VfL Wolfsburg)
- Top goalscorer: League: Dominik Stroh-Engel; All: Dominik Stroh-Engel
- Highest home attendance: 16,500
- Average home league attendance: 14,135
- Biggest win: 5-0 (vs Union Berlin)
- Biggest defeat: 1-4 (vs Fortuna Düsseldorf
Home colours	Away colours
- All statistics correct as of 20 June 2015.

The 2014–15 Darmstadt 98 season was the club's 117th season. This was the club's 18th season in the 2. Bundesliga overall and first since promotion.

== Background ==
Darmstadt 98 played in their 117th season in the 2. Bundesliga after having been promoted after a dramatic relegation-promotion playoff against Arminia Bielefeld in which the deciding goal was scored in the 122nd minute. This was widely seen as a sensation, as Darmstadt were supposed to be relegated in the 2012–13 season but were spared due to their rivals having their licence revoked because of going into administration. The promotion finished a 21–year run outside of the 2. Bundesiga.

== Competitions ==
=== 2. Bundesliga ===
==== League table ====
Pos	Team	Pld	W	D	L	GF	GA	GD	Pts	Promotion, qualification or relegation
1	FC Ingolstadt (C, P)	34	17	13	4	53	32	+21	64	Promotion to Bundesliga
2	Darmstadt 98 (P)	34	15	14	5	44	26	+18	59	Promotion to Bundesliga
3	Karlsruher SC	34	15	13	6	46	26	+20	58	Qualification for promotion play-offs
4	1. FC Kaiserslautern	34	14	14	6	45	31	+14	56	
5	RB Leipzig	34	13	11	10	39	31	+8	50	

Source: DFB
Rules for classification: 1) Points; 2) Goal difference; 3) Goals scored
(C) Champions; (P) Promoted

==== Results summary ====
Overall								Home						Away					
Pld	W	D	L	GF	GA	GD	Pts	W	D	L	GF	GA	GD	W	D	L	GF	GA	GD
34	15	14	5	44	26	+18	59	11	5	1	30	10	+20	4	9	4	14	16	−2

Last updated: 25 May 2015.
Source: Competitive matches

==== Results by round ====
Round	1	2	3	4	5	6	7	8	9	10	11	12	13	14	15	16	17	18	19	20	21	22	23	24	25	26	27	28	29	30	31	32	33	34
Ground	H	A	H	A	H	A	H	A	H	A	H	A	H	A	H	H	A	A	H	A	H	A	H	H	A	H	A	H	A	H	A	H	A	H
Result	W	D	W	D	W	L	W	D	L	D	W	D	W	D	D	D	W	W	D	D	D	W	W	D	W	L	W	D	D	L	W	W	L	W
Position	3	7	3	5	3	6	1	3	6	6	4	4	3	3	3	4	3	2	3	4	4	3	2	2	2	3	3	3	3	4	3	2	2	2

Updated to match(es) played on 25 May 2015. Source: Competitive matches
A = Away; H = Home; W = Win; D = Draw; L = Loss

==== Matches ====
Win Draw Loss

3 August 2014 1	Darmstadt 98	1–0	SV Sandhausen	Darmstadt
15:30 CEST (UTC+02:00)	Stroh-Engel 36' (pen.)	Report		Stadium: Merck-Stadion am Böllenfalltor; Attendance: 13,500; Referee: Robert Hartmann

10 August 2014 2	FC Ingolstadt	2–2	Darmstadt 98	Ingolstadt
13:30 CEST (UTC+02:00)	Lex 22'; Lappe 90'	Report	Brégerie 16'; Stroh-Engel 74'	Stadium: Audi Sportpark; Attendance: 9,000; Referee: Arne Aarnink

24 August 2014 3	Darmstadt 98	2–0	VfR Aalen	Darmstadt
13:30 CEST (UTC+02:00)	Behrens 59'; Stroh-Engel 71'	Report		Stadium: Merck-Stadion am Böllenfalltor; Attendance: 9,200; Referee: Christian Bandurski

31 August 2014 4	1860 München	1–1	Darmstadt 98	Munich
13:30 CEST (UTC+02:00)	Stroh-Engel 31'	Report	Okotie 54'	Stadium: Allianz Arena; Attendance: 19,300; Referee: Martin Petersen

13 September 2014 5	Darmstadt 98	2–0	Erzgebirge Aue	Darmstadt
15:30 CEST (UTC+02:00)	Heller 41'; Stroh-Engel 68'	Report		Stadium: Merck-Stadion am Böllenfalltor; Attendance: 11,100; Referee: Timo Gerach

19 September 2014 6	Eintracht Braunschweig	2–0	Darmstadt 98	Braunschweig
18:30 CEST (UTC+02:00)	Nielsen 34'; Kruppke 90'	Report		Stadium: Eintracht-Stadion; Attendance: 21,800; Referee: Patrick Ittrich

24 September 2014 7	Darmstadt 98	4–0	FSV Frankfurt	Darmstadt
17:30 CEST (UTC+02:00)	Bregerie 16'; Sulu 33', 85'; Gondorf 34'	Report		Stadium: Merck-Stadion am Böllenfalltor; Attendance: 12,400; Referee: Thorsten Schriever

27 September 2014 8	Union Berlin	1–1	Darmstadt 98	Berlin
17:30 CEST (UTC+02:00)	Quiring 85'	Report	Heller 73'	Stadium: Stadion an der Alten Försterei; Attendance: 18,100; Referee: Harm Osmers

5 October 2014 9	Darmstadt 98	1–4	Fortuna Düsseldorf	Darmstadt
13:30 CEST (UTC+02:00)	Pohjanpalo 12', 26', 57'; Benschop 47'	http://fussballdaten.sport.de/zweiteliga/2015/9/darmstadt-duesseldorf/	Kempe 46'	Stadium: Merck-Stadion am Böllenfalltor; Attendance: 16,200; Referee: Marco Fritz

17 October 2014 10	VfL Bochum	1–1	Darmstadt 98	Darmstadt
18:30 CEST (UTC+02:00)	Kempe 10'	Report	Forssell 90+4'	Stadium: Merck-Stadion am Böllenfalltor; Attendance: 19,600; Referee: Robert Hartmann

27 October 2014 11	Darmstadt 98	3–0	1. FC Nürnberg	Stuttgart
20:15 CEST (UTC+02:00)	Stroh-Engel 39'; Balogun 70'; Kempe 82'	http://fussballdaten.sport.de/zweiteliga/2015/11/darmstadt-nuernberg/		Stadium: Mercedes-Benz Arena; Attendance: 16,500; Referee: Martin Petersen

1 November 2014 12	1. FC Heidenheim	1–1	Darmstadt 98	Heidenheim
13:00 CEST (UTC+02:00)	Stroh-Engel 7'	Report	Morabit 37'	Stadium: Voith-Arena; Attendance: 12,000; Referee: Markus Wingenbach

8 November 2014 13	Darmstadt 98	1–0	RB Leipzig	Darmstadt
13:00 CEST (UTC+02:00)	Stroh-Engel 7'	http://fussballdaten.sport.de/zweiteliga/2015/13/darmstadt-rbleipzig/		Stadium: Merck-Stadion am Böllenfalltor; Attendance: 15,000; Referee: Christian Dingert

21 November 2014 14	1. FC Kaiserslautern	0–0	Darmstadt 98	Kaiserslautern
20:30 CEST (UTC+02:00)		Report		Stadium: Fritz-Walter Stadion; Attendance: 36,000; Referee: Bibiana Steinhaus

28 November 2014 15	Darmstadt 98	0–0	Karlsruher SC	Darmstadt
18:30 CEST (UTC+02:00)		Report		Stadium: Merck-Stadion am Böllenfalltor; Attendance: 15,200; Referee: Benjamin Cortus

6 December 2014 16	Darmstadt 98	0–0	Greuther Fürth	Darmstadt
13:00 CEST (UTC+02:00)		Report		Stadium: Merck-Stadion am Böllenfalltor; Attendance: 11,200; Referee: Guido Winkmann

14 December 2014 17	FC St. Pauli	0–1	Darmstadt 98	Hamburg
15:30 CEST (UTC+02:00)		http://fussballdaten.sport.de/zweiteliga/2015/17/stpauli-darmstadt/	Holland 86'	Stadium: Millerntorstadion; Attendance: 23,800; Referee: Harm Osmers

17 December 2014 18	SV Sandhausen	1–2	Darmstadt 98	Sandhausen
17:30 CEST (UTC+02:00)	Bouhaddouz 15' (o.g.)	http://fussballdaten.sport.de/zweiteliga/2015/18/sandhausen-darmstadt/	Stiefler 15' (o.g.); Behrens 86'	Stadium: Hardtwaldstadion; Attendance: 5,100; Referee: Sven Jablonski

21 December 2014 19	Darmstadt 98	2–2	FC Ingolstadt	Darmstadt
13:30 CEST (UTC+02:00)	Behrens 7'; Heller 54'	Report	Groß 20'; Lex 40'	Stadium: Merck-Stadion am Böllenfalltor; Attendance: 14,300; Referee: Frank Willenborg

6 February 2015 20	VfR Aalen	0–0	Darmstadt 98	Aalen
18:30 CEST (UTC+02:00)		Report		Stadium: Scholz-Arena; Attendance: 6,000; Referee: Günter Perl

15 February 2015 21	Darmstadt 98	1–1	1860 München	Darmstadt
13:30 CEST (UTC+02:00)	Bandowski 26'	http://fussballdaten.sport.de/zweiteliga/2015/21/darmstadt-tsv1860/	Balogun 83'	Stadium: Merck-Stadion am Böllenfalltor; Attendance: 15,600; Referee: Rene Rohde

20 February 2015 22	Erzgebirge Aue	0–1	Darmstadt 98	Aue
18:30 CEST (UTC+02:00)		http://fussballdaten.sport.de/zweiteliga/2015/22/aue-darmstadt/	Gondorf 83'	Stadium: Sparkassen-Erzgebirgsstadion; Attendance: 9,000; Referee: Bibiana Steinhaus

27 February 2015 23	Darmstadt 98	1–0	Eintracht Braunschweig	Darmstadt
18:30 CEST (UTC+02:00)	Rosenthal 90'	Report		Stadium: Merck-Stadion am Böllenfalltor; Attendance: 13,600; Referee: Thorsten Kinhöfer

8 March 2015 24	FSV Frankfurt	1–1	Darmstadt 98	Darmstadt
13:30 CET (UTC+01:00)	Dedić 65'	http://fussballdaten.sport.de/zweiteliga/2015/24/fsvffm-darmstadt/	Gondorf 76'	Stadium: Merck-Stadion am Böllenfalltor; Attendance: 12,500; Referee: Guido Winkmann

13 March 2015 25	Darmstadt 98	5–0	Union Berlin	Darmstadt
18:30 CET (UTC+01:00)	Balogun 34'; Brégerie 45' (pen.); Ivana 56'; Sulu 80', 83'	http://fussballdaten.sport.de/zweiteliga/2015/25/darmstadt-fcunion/		Stadium: Merck-Stadion am Böllenfalltor; Attendance: 15,000; Referee: Deniz Aytekin

21 March 2015 26	Fortuna Düsseldorf	2–0	Darmstadt 98	Düsseldorf
13:00 CEST (UTC+02:00)	Benschop 44' (pen.), 66'	http://fussballdaten.sport.de/zweiteliga/2015/26/duesseldorf-darmstadt/		Stadium: Esprit-Arena; Attendance: 31,000; Referee: Robert Kempter

5 April 2015 27	Darmstadt 98	2–0	VfL Bochum	Darmstadt
13:30 CEST (UTC+02:00)	Brégerie 22'; Balogun 77'	http://fussballdaten.sport.de/zweiteliga/2015/27/darmstadt-bochum/		Stadium: Merck-Stadion am Böllenfalltor; Attendance: 16,000; Referee: Daniel Siebert

10 April 2015 28	1. FC Nürnberg	1–1	Darmstadt 98	Nuremberg
18:45 CEST (UTC+02:00)	Burgstaller 34'	Report	Sailer 73'	Stadium: Grundig-Stadion; Attendance: 30,600; Referee: Sascha Stegemann

19 April 2015 29	Darmstadt 98	1–1	1. FC Heidenheim	Darmstadt
13:30 CEST (UTC+02:00)	Stroh-Engel 64' (pen.)	http://fussballdaten.sport.de/zweiteliga/2015/29/darmstadt-heidenheim/	Niederlechner 77'	Stadium: Merck-Stadion am Böllenfalltor; Attendance: 14,300; Referee: Benjamin Cortus

24 April 2015 30	RB Leipzig	2–1	Darmstadt 98	Leipzig
18:30 CEST (UTC+02:00)	Klostermann 79'; Coltorti 90'	http://fussballdaten.sport.de/zweiteliga/2015/30/rbleipzig-darmstadt/	Behrens 77'	Stadium: Red-Bull-Arena; Attendance: 25,300; Referee: Robert Kampka

2 May 2015 31	Darmstadt 98	3–2	1. FC Kaiserslautern	Darmstadt
13:00 CEST (UTC+02:00)	Brégerie 19' (pen.); König 22'; Behrens 40'	Report	Demirbay 13'; Stöger 88'	Stadium: Merck-Stadion am Böllenfalltor; Attendance: 16,150; Referee: Wolfgang Stark

11 May 2015 32	Karlsruher SC	0–1	Darmstadt 98	Karlsruhe
20:15 CEST (UTC+02:00)		Report	Kempe 66'	Stadium: Wildpark-Stadion; Attendance: 27,500; Referee: Manuel Gräfe

17 May 2015 33	Greuther Fürth	1–0	Darmstadt 98	Fürth
15:30 CEST (UTC+02:00)	Stiepermann 61'	Report		Stadium: Stadion am Laubenweg; Attendance: 17,500; Referee: Thorsten Kinhöfer

24 May 2015 34	Darmstadt 98	1–0	FC St. Pauli	Darmstadt
15:30 CEST (UTC+02:00)	Kempe	Report		Stadium: Merck-Stadion am Böllenfalltor; Attendance: 16,200; Referee: Florian Meyer

=== DFB-Pokal ===
17 August 2014	Darmstadt 98	0–0 (a.e.t.) (4–5 p)	VfL Wolfsburg	Darmstadt
20:30		Report		Stadium: Stadion am Böllenfalltor; Attendance: 13,900; Referee: Peter Gagelmann (Bremen)
	Penalties
	Brégerie (penalty scored); Behrens (penalty scored); Holland (penalty scored); Exslager (penalty missed); Stroh-Engel (penalty scored); Ivana (penalty missed)		(penalty missed) Naldo; (penalty scored) Dost; (penalty scored) Rodríguez; (penalty scored) De Bruyne; (penalty scored) Olić; (penalty scored) Vieirinha
