= Marvin Mehlem =

German footballer (born 1997)

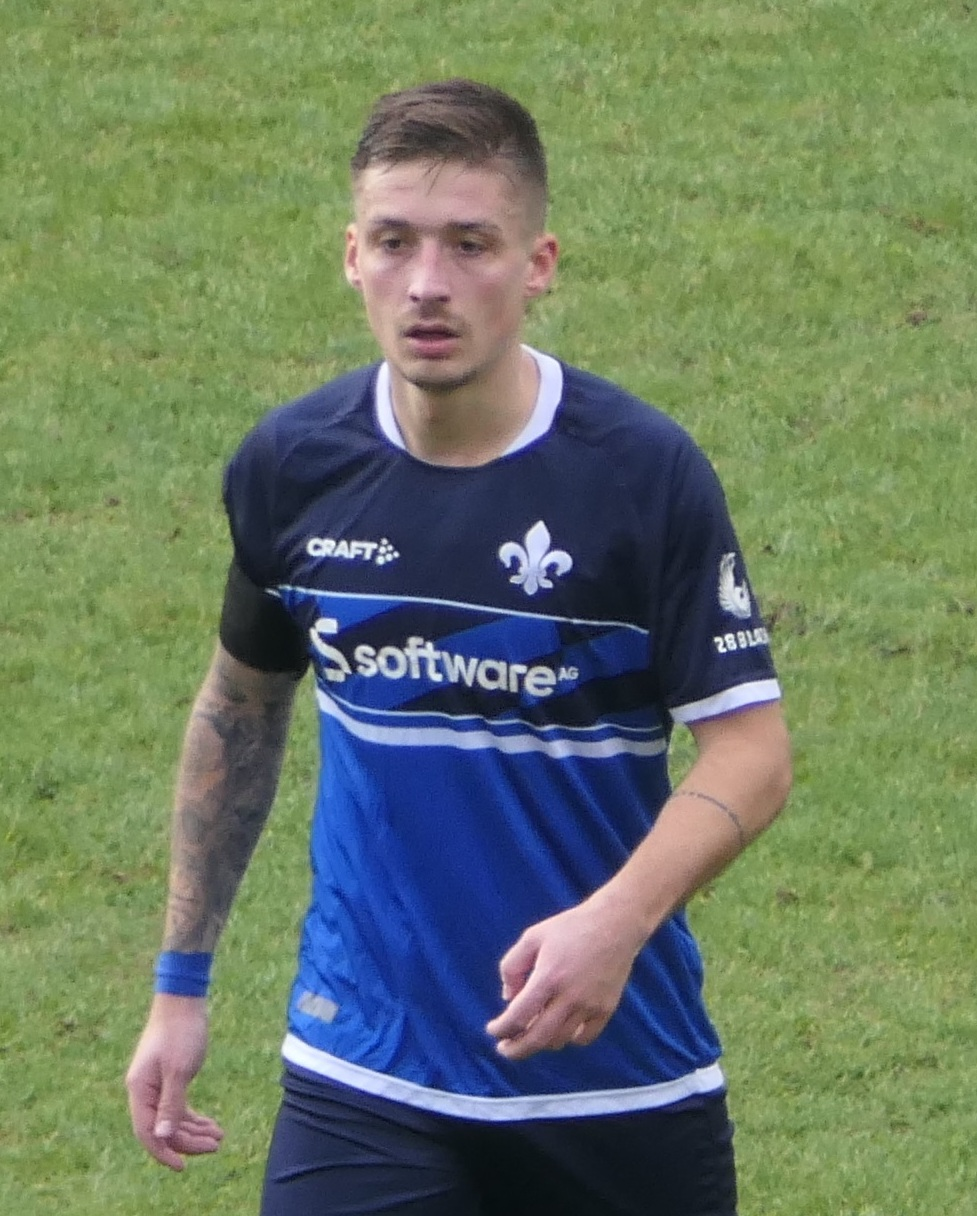
- Mehlem with Darmstadt 98 in 2023

Personal information
- Full name: Marvin Mehlem
- Date of birth: 11 September 1997 (age 29)
- Place of birth: Karlsruhe, Germany
- Height: 1.74 m (5 ft 9 in)
- Position: Midfielder

Team information
- Current team: Arminia Bielefeld
- Number: 6

Youth career
- 2012–2015: Karlsruher SC

Senior career*
Years	Team	Apps	(Gls)
2015–2017	Karlsruher SC	11	(0)
2017–2024	Darmstadt 98	181	(19)
2024–2025	Hull City	16	(0)
2025	→ SC Paderborn (loan)	16	(4)
2025–	Arminia Bielefeld	19	(0)

International career
2013	Germany U16	4	(3)
2013	Germany U17	6	(1)
2014	Germany U18	2	(0)
2015–2016	Germany U19	20	(7)
- * Club domestic league appearances and goals as of 18 May 2026

Marvin Mehlem (born 11 September 1997) is a German professional footballer who plays as a midfielder for 2. Bundesliga club Arminia Bielefeld.

== Club career ==
=== Darmstadt 98 ===
Mehlem joined Darmstadt 98 from his boyhood club Karlsruher SC in 2017. He would stay with them for seven years, being a part of the side that got The Lilies into the Bundesliga for only the third time in their history.

=== Hull City ===
Following top flight relegation three months earlier, Mehlem signed a two-year deal with EFL Championship club Hull City on 1 August 2024 for an undisclosed fee. He made his debut for the Tigers on the opening day of the 2024–25 season, a 1–1 home draw with Bristol City on 10 August 2024. Mehlem was substituted for fellow summer signing Finley Burns in the dying embers of the game, having just won his new side the penalty which would eventually secure them their first point of the season. He got his first goal for the club just a few days later, on 14 August 2024, scoring Hull's only goal in their 2–1 home defeat to Sheffield Wednesday in the first round of the EFL Cup.

On 3 January 2025, Mehlem returned to Germany, joining 2. Bundesliga side SC Paderborn on loan for the remainder of the season.

=== Arminia Bielefeld ===
On 8 July 2025, Mehlem returned to Germany on a permanent basis, joining 2. Bundesliga club Arminia Bielefeld for an undisclosed fee.

== International career ==
Mehlem is a former Germany youth international, representing his country between U16 and U19 levels.

== Career statistics ==
As of 26 January 2025

Appearances and goals by club, season and competition
Club	Season	League			National cup (Note: Includes DFB-Pokal)		League cup (Note: Includes EFL Cup)		Other		Total	
Club	Season	Division	Apps	Goals	Apps	Goals	Apps	Goals	Apps	Goals	Apps	Goals
Karlsruher SC	2015–16	2. Bundesliga	3	0	0	0	—		—		3	0
Karlsruher SC	2016–17	2. Bundesliga	8	0	0	0	—		—		8	0
Karlsruher SC	Total		11	0	0	0	—		—		11	0
Darmstadt 98	2017–18	2. Bundesliga	21	2	0	0	—		—		21	2
Darmstadt 98	2018–19	2. Bundesliga	30	5	1	0	—		—		31	5
Darmstadt 98	2019–20	2. Bundesliga	26	1	2	1	—		—		8	2
Darmstadt 98	2020–21	2. Bundesliga	32	5	3	1	—		—		35	6
Darmstadt 98	2021–22	2. Bundesliga	20	0	0	0	—		—		20	0
Darmstadt 98	2022–23	2. Bundesliga	32	3	3	0	—		—		35	3
Darmstadt 98	2023–24	Bundesliga	20	3	1	0	—		—		21	3
Darmstadt 98	Total		181	19	10	2	—		—		191	21
Hull City	2024–25	EFL Championship	16	0	0	0	1	1	—		17	1
SC Paderborn (loan)	2024–25	2. Bundesliga	3	0	0	0	—		—		3	0
Career total			211	19	10	2	1	1	0	0	222	22
