= Fabian Holland (footballer) =

German footballer (born 1990)

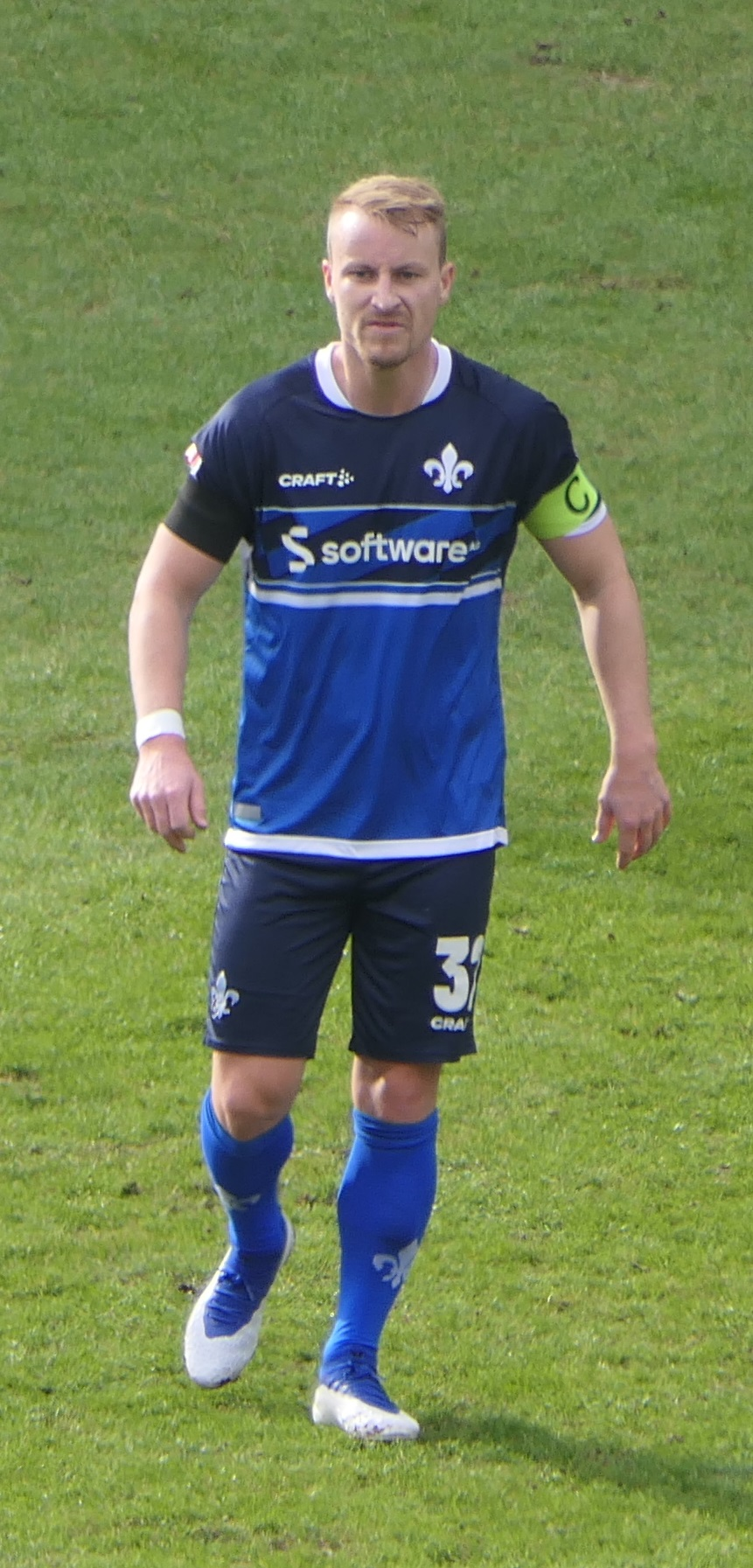
- Holland in 2023

Personal information
- Date of birth: 11 July 1990 (age 36)
- Place of birth: Berlin, Germany
- Height: 1.80 m (5 ft 11 in)
- Positions: Left-back; defensive midfielder

Youth career
- –2003: FSV Forst Borgsdorf
- 2003–2008: Hertha BSC

Senior career*
Years	Team	Apps	(Gls)
2008–2015	Hertha BSC II	85	(11)
2012–2015	Hertha BSC	23	(0)
2014–2015	→ SV Darmstadt 98 (loan)	26	(1)
2015–2026	SV Darmstadt 98	275	(6)

International career
2010	Germany U-20	1	(0)
- * Club domestic league appearances and goals as of 18 May 2026

Fabian Holland (born 11 July 1990) is a German professional footballer who plays as a left-back or defensive midfielder.

== Career ==
Holland began his career in the youth teams of FSV Forst Borgsdorf, before joining Bundesliga club Hertha BSC in 2003. Working his way up through the youth divisions, he made the jump to the reserves in 2008, and started regularly as of the 2009–10 season. In summer 2010, Holland was diagnosed with Wolff–Parkinson–White syndrome, and had to undergo a heart operation. He recovered quickly from the operation, and began playing again in October 2010. In February 2011, he trained with the Hertha's team for the first time. On 21 April 2012, Holland made his Bundesliga debut when he started against 1. FC Kaiserslautern. Hertha were relegated that year, but Holland became more of a regular in the Hertha side during the 2012–13 2. Bundesliga season. Holland was loaned out to SV Darmstadt 98 for the 2014–15 season in the 2. Bundesliga where he became a regular and managed to get promoted to the Bundesliga. On 5 July 2015, Holland signed for Darmstadt 98 for two years. He got relegated in the 2016–17 Bundesliga season with Darmstadt.

In the 2022–23 Bundesliga season Darmstadt secured promotion, Darmstadt got relegated again in the 2023-24 Bundesliga season.

== Career statistics ==
As of match played on 14 April 2024.

Appearances and goals by club, season and competition
Club	Season	League			Cup^{1}		Other^{2}		Total	
Club	Season	Division	Apps	Goals	Apps	Goals	Apps	Goals	Apps	Goals
Hertha BSC II	2008–09	Regionalliga Nord	6	1	—		—		6	1
Hertha BSC II	2009–10	Regionalliga Nord	27	3	—		—		27	3
Hertha BSC II	2010–11	Regionalliga Nord	23	2	—		—		23	2
Hertha BSC II	2011–12	Regionalliga Nord	11	3	—		—		11	3
Hertha BSC II	2012–13	Regionalliga Nordost	2	0	—		—		2	0
Hertha BSC II	2013–14	Regionalliga Nordost	15	2	—		—		15	2
Hertha BSC II	Total		84	11	—		—		84	11
Hertha BSC	2011–12	Bundesliga	2	0	0	0	1	0	3	0
Hertha BSC	2012–13	2. Bundesliga	18	0	0	0	—		18	0
Hertha BSC	2013–14	Bunsdesliga	3	0	1	0	—		4	0
Hertha BSC	Total		23	0	1	0	1	0	25	0
Darmstadt 98 (loan)	2014–15	2. Bundesliga	26	1	1	0	—		27	1
Darmstadt 98	2015–16	Bundesliga	18	0	1	0	—		19	0
Darmstadt 98	2016–17	Bundesliga	26	0	2	0	—		28	0
Darmstadt 98	2017–18	2. Bundesliga	32	1	0	0	—		32	1
Darmstadt 98	2018–19	2. Bundesliga	32	0	2	0	—		34	0
Darmstadt 98	2019–20	2. Bundesliga	32	0	2	0	—		34	0
Darmstadt 98	2020–21	2. Bundesliga	29	1	3	0	—		32	1
Darmstadt 98	2021–22	2. Bundesliga	34	3	1	0	—		35	3
Darmstadt 98	2022–23	2. Bundesliga	28	1	3	0	—		31	1
Darmstadt 98	2023–24	Bundesliga	23	0	1	0	—		24	0
Darmstadt 98	Total		254	6	15	0	—		269	6
Career total			387	18	17	0	1	0	405	18

- 1.Includes German Cup.
- 2.Includes Relegation playoff.
