= 2022–23 SV Darmstadt 98 season =

SV Darmstadt 98
2022–23 season
- President: Klaus Rüdiger Fritsch
- Head coach: Torsten Lieberknecht
- Stadium: Merck-Stadion am Böllenfalltor
- 2. Bundesliga: 2nd (promoted)
- DFB-Pokal: Round of 16
- Top goalscorer: League: Phillip Tietz (12); All: Phillip Tietz (14)
Home colours	Away colours

The 2022–23 season was the 125th season in the history of SV Darmstadt 98 and their sixth consecutive season in the second division. The club participated in the 2. Bundesliga and the DFB-Pokal.

== Players ==
As of 12 July 2022

Note: Flags indicate national team as defined under FIFA eligibility rules; some limited exceptions apply. Players may hold more than one non-FIFA nationality.

No.	Pos.	Nation	Player
1	GK	GER	Marcel Schuhen
3	DF	SWE	Thomas Isherwood
5	DF	GER	Patric Pfeiffer
6	MF	GER	Marvin Mehlem
8	MF	GER	Fabian Schnellhardt
9	FW	GER	Phillip Tietz
11	MF	GER	Tobias Kempe
13	GK	GER	Morten Behrens
14	MF	DEN	Magnus Warming (on loan from Torino)
17	MF	GER	Frank Ronstadt
18	MF	AUT	Mathias Honsak
19	DF	AUT	Emir Karić
20	DF	GER	Jannik Müller

No.	Pos.	Nation	Player
21	GK	GER	Steve Kroll
22	FW	GER	Aaron Seydel
23	MF	ALB	Klaus Gjasula
26	DF	GER	Matthias Bader
28	MF	FRA	Yassin Ben Balla
29	FW	SWE	Oscar Vilhelmsson
30	MF	GER	Alexander Brunst
32	DF	GER	Fabian Holland (Captain)
33	MF	GHA	Braydon Manu
35	MF	SLE	John Peter Sesay
36	FW	GER	André Leipold
38	MF	GER	Clemens Riedel

=== On loan ===
Note: Flags indicate national team as defined under FIFA eligibility rules; some limited exceptions apply. Players may hold more than one non-FIFA nationality.

No.	Pos.	Nation	Player
—	FW	GER	Henry Crosthwaite (at TuS Rot-Weiß Koblenz)

== Pre-season and friendlies ==
Win Draw Loss Fixtures

18 June 2022 Friendly	Rot-Weiß Darmstadt (Germany)	0–7	(Germany) Darmstadt 98	Darmstadt
18:00 CEST (UTC+2)				Stadium: Waldsportpark

24 June 2022 Friendly	Viktoria Griesheim (Germany)	0–8	(Germany) Darmstadt 98	Griesheim
18:30 CEST (UTC+2)				Stadium: Kunstrasenplatz Griesheim

22 September 2022 Friendly	Wehen Wiesbaden (Germany)	4–4	(Germany) Darmstadt 98	Taunusstein
13:00 CEST (UTC+2)				Stadium: Stadion am Halberg

17 December 2022 Friendly	Darmstadt 98 (Germany)	2–0	(Switzerland) Young Boys	Darmstadt
18:00 CET (UTC+1)				Stadium: Merck-Stadion am Böllenfalltor

7 January 2022 Friendly	Wehen Wiesbaden (Germany)	1–1	(Germany) Darmstadt 98	Oliva
13:00 CET (UTC+1)		Report		Stadium: Oliva Nova Golf & Beach Resort Campo 1

13 January 2022 Friendly	Darmstadt 98 (Germany)	1–0	(Romania) CFR Cluj	Oliva
13:00 CET (UTC+1)		Report		Stadium: Oliva Nova Golf & Beach Resort Campo 1

21 January 2023 Friendly	Darmstadt 98 (Germany)	1–0	(Switzerland) Wil	Darmstadt
13:00 CET (UTC+1)		Report		Stadium: Merck-Stadion am Böllenfalltor

== Competitions ==
=== Overall record ===
Competition	First match	Last match	Starting round	Final position	Record							
Competition	First match	Last match	Starting round	Final position	Pld	W	D	L	GF	GA	GD	Win %
2. Bundesliga	16 July 2022	28 May 2023	Matchday 1	2nd	34	20	7	7	50	33	+17	58.82
DFB-Pokal	1 August 2022	7 February 2023	First round	Round of 16	3	2	0	1	7	5	+2	66.67
Total					37	22	7	8	57	38	+19	59.46

Source: Soccerway

=== 2. Bundesliga ===
==== League table ====
Pos	Team	Pld	W	D	L	GF	GA	GD	Pts	Promotion, qualification or relegation
1	1. FC Heidenheim (C, P)	34	19	10	5	67	36	+31	67	Promotion to Bundesliga
2	Darmstadt 98 (P)	34	20	7	7	50	33	+17	67	Promotion to Bundesliga
3	Hamburger SV	34	20	6	8	70	45	+25	66	Qualification for promotion play-offs
4	Fortuna Düsseldorf	34	17	7	10	60	43	+17	58	
5	FC St. Pauli	34	16	10	8	55	39	+16	58	

Source: DFB
Rules for classification: 1) Points; 2) Goal difference; 3) Goals scored; 4) Head-to-head results; 5) Head-to-head away goals scored; 6) Away goals scored; 7) Play-off.
(C) Champions; (P) Promoted

==== Results summary ====
Overall								Home						Away					
Pld	W	D	L	GF	GA	GD	Pts	W	D	L	GF	GA	GD	W	D	L	GF	GA	GD
34	20	7	7	50	33	+17	67	11	5	1	27	13	+14	9	2	6	23	20	+3

Source: DFB

==== Results by round ====
Round	1	2	3	4	5	6	7	8	9	10	11	12	13	14	15	16	17	18	19	20	21	22	23	24	25	26	27	28	29	30	31	32	33	34
Ground	A	H	A	H	A	H	H	A	H	A	H	A	H	A	H	A	H	H	A	H	A	H	A	A	H	A	H	A	H	A	H	A	H	A
Result	L	W	W	W	W	D	D	D	W	W	W	W	D	D	W	W	D	W	W	W	W	D	L	L	W	W	W	L	W	W	L	L	W	L
Position	16	12	9	3	2	2	4	4	3	2	2	1	1	1	1	1	1	1	1	1	1	1	1	1	1	1	1	1	1	1	1	1	1	2

Source: DFB
A = Away; H = Home; W = Win; D = Draw; L = Loss

==== Matches ====
The league fixtures were announced on 17 June 2022.

2. Bundesliga match details
Match	Date	Time	Opponent	Venue	Result F–A	Scorers	Attendance	Ref.
1	16 July 2022	13:00	Jahn Regensburg	Away	0–2		8,509	
2	22 July 2022	18:30	SV Sandhausen	Home	2–1	Manu 9', Mehlem 55'	13,620	
3	7 August 2022	13:30	Eintracht Braunschweig	Away	1–0	Vilhelmsson 86'	16,731	
4	13 August 2022	20:30	Hansa Rostock	Home	4–0	Tietz 3', 54', Mehlem 18', Kempe 74' pen.	14,120	
5	19 August 2022	18:30	Hamburger SV	Away	2–1	Pfeiffer 4', Tietz 7'	43,943	
6	27 August 2022	13:00	1. FC Heidenheim	Home	2–2	Manu 36', Ronstadt 76'	13,280	
7	4 September 2022	13:30	Arminia Bielefeld	Home	1–1	Manu 8'	13,000	
8	11 September 2022	13:30	1. FC Kaiserslautern	Away	3–3	Kempe 45+2' pen., Tietz 49', Seydel 90+1'	38,380	
9	17 September 2022	13:00	1. FC Nürnberg	Home	2–0	Kempe 8', Tietz 27'	14,500	
10	30 September 2022	18:30	SC Paderborn	Away	2–1	Manu 10', Müller 24'	11,238	
11	8 October 2022	13:00	Fortuna Düsseldorf	Home	1–0	Pfeiffer 72'	15,850	
12	15 October 2022	13:00	Karlsruher SC	Away	2–1	Pfeiffer 49', Tietz 88'	19,391	
13	21 October 2022	18:30	Holstein Kiel	Home	1–1	Bader 72'	14,650	
14	29 October 2022	20:30	FC St. Pauli	Away	1–1	Ronstadt 60'	29,546	
15	4 November 2022	18:30	Hannover 96	Home	1–0	Mehlem 62'	15,475	
16	10 November 2022	20:30	1. FC Magdeburg	Away	1–0	Pfeiffer 78'	18,788	
17	13 November 2022	13:30	Greuther Fürth	Home	1–1	Karic 2'	15,080	
18	28 January 2023	13:00	Jahn Regensburg	Home	2–0	Manu 18', Holland 29'	15,798	
19	3 February 2023	18:30	SV Sandhausen	Away	4–0	Honsak 6' 25', Vilhelmsson 55', Karic 89'	7,254	
20	12 February 2023	13:30	Eintracht Braunschweig	Home	2–1	Honsak 82', Tietz 90'	16,342	
21	18 February 2023	20:30	Hansa Rostock	Away	1–0	Tietz 78'	25,200	
22	25 February 2023	20:30	Hamburger SV	Home	1–1	Stojilković 81'	16,800	
23	4 March 2023	20:30	1. FC Heidenheim	Away	0–1		12,212	
24	11 March 2023	13:00	Arminia Bielefeld	Away	1–3	Honsak 54'	18,123	
25	18 March 2023	20:30	1. FC Kaiserslautern	Home	2–0	Stojilković 36', 43'	17,650	
26	31 March 2023	18:30	1. FC Nürnberg	Away	1–0	Schindler 31' o.g.	26,545	
27	9 April 2023	13:30	SC Paderborn	Home	2–1	Bader 35', Manu 59'	16,674	
28	16 April 2023	13:30	Fortuna Düsseldorf	Away	0–1		30,179	
29	21 April 2023	18:30	Karlsruher SC	Home	2–1	Manu 26', Tietz 51'	17,650	
30	30 April 2023	13:30	Holstein Kiel	Away	3–0	Müller 6', Lorenz 22' o.g., Tietz 52'	13,296	
31	6 May 2023	20:30	FC St. Pauli	Home	0–3		17,650	
32	14 May 2023	13:30	Hannover 96	Away	1–2	Tietz 43'	30,000	
33	19 May 2023	18:30	1. FC Magdeburg	Home	1–0	Tietz 36'	17,650	
34	28 May 2023	15:30	Greuther Fürth	Away	0–4		14,333	

=== DFB-Pokal ===
DFB-Pokal match details
Round	Date	Time	Opponent	Venue	Result F–A	Scorers	Attendance	Ref.
First round	1 August 2022	18:01	FC Ingolstadt	Away	3–0	Tietz 15', Kempe 42' pen., Warming 84'	5,208	
Second round	18 October 2022	20:45	Borussia Mönchengladbach	Home	2–1	Tietz 23', Seydel 79'	15,850	
Round of 16	7 February 2023	20:45	Eintracht Frankfurt	Away	2–4	Honsak 29', 31'	49,500	
