= Filip Stojilković =

Swiss footballer (born 2000)

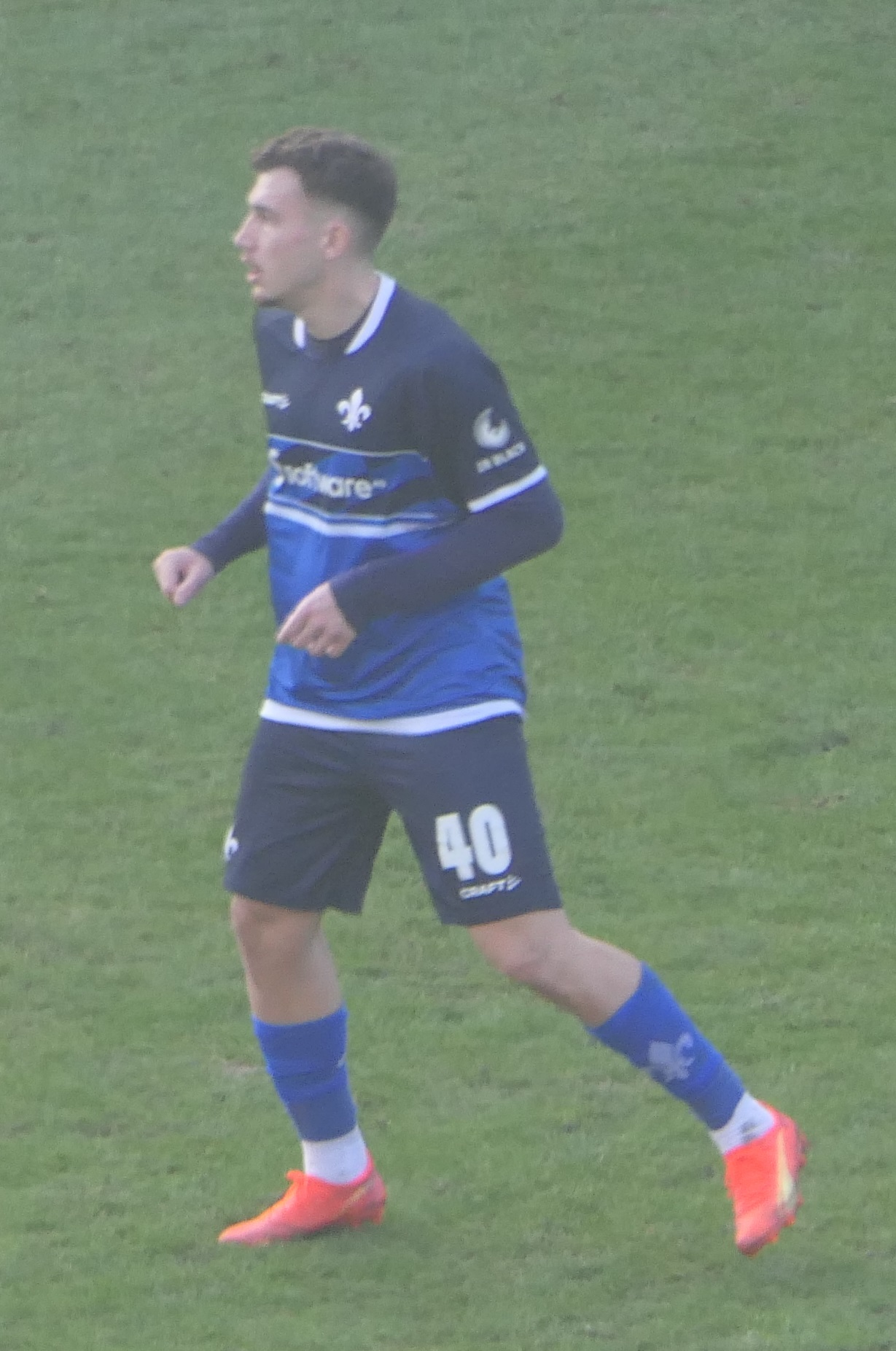
- Stojilković in 2023

Personal information
- Date of birth: 4 January 2000 (age 26)
- Place of birth: Zollikon, Switzerland
- Height: 1.86 m (6 ft 1 in)
- Position: Forward

Team information
- Current team: Rapid București (on loan from Pisa)
- Number: 9

Youth career
- 2010–2014: Zürich
- 2014: Red Star Zürich
- 2014–2018: Zürich
- 2018–2019: Hoffenheim

Senior career*
Years	Team	Apps	(Gls)
2017–2018	Zürich U21	9	(1)
2019	Hoffenheim II	2	(0)
2019–2020	Wil	18	(8)
2020–2023	Sion	64	(17)
2020	Sion U21	3	(2)
2020–2021	→ Aarau (loan)	32	(15)
2023–2025	Darmstadt 98	22	(3)
2024	→ 1. FC Kaiserslautern (loan)	6	(1)
2024	→ 1. FC Kaiserslautern II (loan)	1	(0)
2024–2025	→ OFK Beograd (loan)	26	(7)
2025–2026	Cracovia	18	(7)
2026–	Pisa	13	(0)
2026–	→ Rapid București (loan)	12	(4)

International career
2017	Switzerland U18	2	(1)
2018	Switzerland U19	5	(0)
2019–2023	Switzerland U21	25	(2)
- * Club domestic league appearances and goals as of 7 November 2026

Filip Stojilković (Serbian Cyrillic: Филип Стојилковић; born 4 January 2000) is a Swiss professional footballer who plays as a forward for Liga I club Rapid București, on loan from Serie B club Pisa.

== Club career ==
On 31 January 2023, Stojilković signed a four-and-a-half-year contract with Darmstadt 98 in Germany.

On 21 December 2023, Darmstadt 98 sent Stojilković on loan to 2. Bundesliga side 1. FC Kaiserslautern for the rest of the season.

On 30 January 2026, Stojilković signed with Pisa in Serie A.

== Personal life ==
Born in Switzerland, Stojilković is of Serbian descent.

== Career statistics ==
As of match played 7 November 2026

Appearances and goals by club, season and competition
Club	Season	League			National cup (Note: Includes Swiss Cup, DFB-Pokal, Serbian Cup, Polish Cup, Cupa României)		Europe		Other		Total	
Club	Season	Division	Apps	Goals	Apps	Goals	Apps	Goals	Apps	Goals	Apps	Goals
Zürich U21	2017–18	Swiss Promotion League	6	0	—		—		—		6	0
Zürich U21	2018–19	Swiss Promotion League	3	1	—		—		—		3	1
Zürich U21	Total		9	1	—		—		—		9	1
Hoffenheim II	2018–19	Regionalliga Südwest	2	0	—		—		—		2	0
Wil	2019–20	Swiss Challenge League	18	8	2	0	—		—		20	8
Sion	2019–20	Swiss Super League	11	1	—		—		—		11	1
Sion	2021–22	Swiss Super League	35	11	2	1	—		—		37	12
Sion	2022–23	Swiss Super League	18	5	3	1	—		—		21	6
Sion	Total		64	17	5	2	—		—		69	19
Sion U21	2020–21	Swiss Promotion League	3	2	—		—		—		3	2
Aarau (loan)	2020–21	Swiss Challenge League	32	15	3	1	—		—		35	16
Darmstadt 98	2022–23	2. Bundesliga	15	3	1	0	—		—		16	3
Darmstadt 98	2023–24	Bundesliga	6	0	1	0	—		—		7	0
Darmstadt 98	2024–25	2. Bundesliga	1	0	0	0	—		—		1	0
Darmstadt 98	Total		22	3	2	0	—		—		24	3
1. FC Kaiserslautern (loan)	2023–24	2. Bundesliga	6	1	2	0	—		—		8	1
1. FC Kaiserslautern II (loan)	2023–24	Oberliga Rheinland-Pfalz/Saar	1	0	—		—		—		1	0
OFK Beograd (loan)	2024–25	Serbian SuperLiga	26	7	1	0	—		—		27	7
Cracovia	2025–26	Ekstraklasa	18	7	1	0	—		—		19	7
Pisa	2025–26	Serie A	13	0	—		—		—		13	0
Rapid București (loan)	2026–27	Liga I	12	3	1	0	—		—		13	3
Career total			226	64	17	3	—		—		243	67
