= Oscar Vilhelmsson =

Swedish footballer

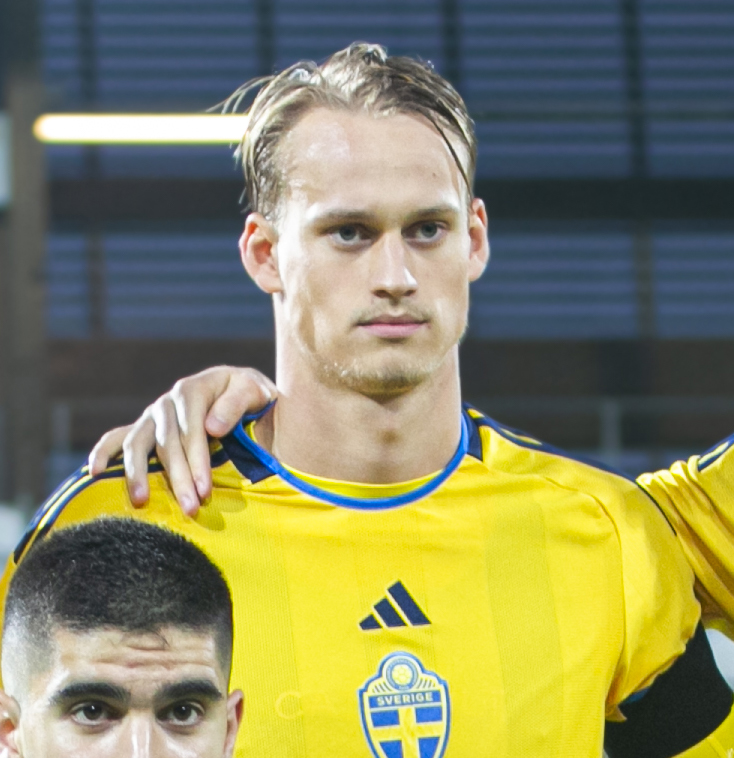
- Vilhelmsson with Sweden U21 in 2023

Personal information
- Full name: Oscar Ingemar Kristoffer Vilhelmsson
- Date of birth: 2 October 2003 (age 23)
- Place of birth: Åsa, Sweden
- Height: 1.88 m (6 ft 2 in)
- Position: Forward

Team information
- Current team: Preußen Münster
- Number: 11

Youth career
- –2016: Åsa IF
- 2017–2020: IFK Göteborg

Senior career*
| Years | Team | Apps | (Gls) |
| 2019–2022 | IFK Göteborg | 28 | (4) |
| 2022–2025 | Darmstadt 98 | 52 | (7) |
| 2025– | Preußen Münster | 17 | (2) |

International career^{‡}
| 2019–2020 | Sweden U17 | 14 | (4) |
| 2021–2022 | Sweden U19 | 6 | (1) |
| 2023–2024 | Sweden U21 | 6 | (6) |
- * Club domestic league appearances and goals as of 18 May 2026 ‡ National team caps and goals as of 16:51, 16 October 2024 (UTC)

Oscar Ingemar Kristoffer Vilhelmsson (born 2 October 2003) is a Swedish professional footballer who plays for German 3. Liga club Preußen Münster as a forward.

== Club career ==
On 12 July 2022, Vilhelmsson signed a four-year contract with Darmstadt 98 in Germany.

On 24 June 2025, Vilhelmsson moved to Preußen Münster in 2. Bundesliga.

== Career statistics ==
As of match played on 9 May 2024

Appearances and goals by club, season and competition
| Club | Season | League | | | Cup | | Europe | | Other | | Total | |
| Club | Season | Division | Apps | Goals | Apps | Goals | Apps | Goals | Apps | Goals | Apps | Goals |
|---|---|---|---|---|---|---|---|---|---|---|---|---|
| Göteborg | 2019 | Allsvenskan | — | | 1 | 0 | — | | — | | 1 | 0 |
| Göteborg | 2020 | Allsvenskan | 3 | 0 | 0 | 0 | — | | — | | 3 | 0 |
| Göteborg | 2021 | Allsvenskan | 14 | 2 | 0 | 0 | — | | — | | 14 | 2 |
| Göteborg | 2022 | Allsvenskan | 11 | 2 | 4 | 1 | — | | — | | 15 | 3 |
| Göteborg | Total | | 28 | 4 | 5 | 1 | — | | — | | 33 | 5 |
| Darmstadt 98 | 2022–23 | 2. Bundesliga | 14 | 2 | 1 | 0 | — | | — | | 15 | 2 |
| Darmstadt 98 | 2023–24 | Bundesliga | 26 | 4 | 1 | 0 | — | | — | | 27 | 4 |
| Darmstadt 98 | Total | | 40 | 6 | 2 | 0 | — | | — | | 42 | 6 |
| Career total | | | 68 | 10 | 7 | 1 | 0 | 0 | 0 | 0 | 75 | 11 |
