= Tobias Kempe =

German footballer

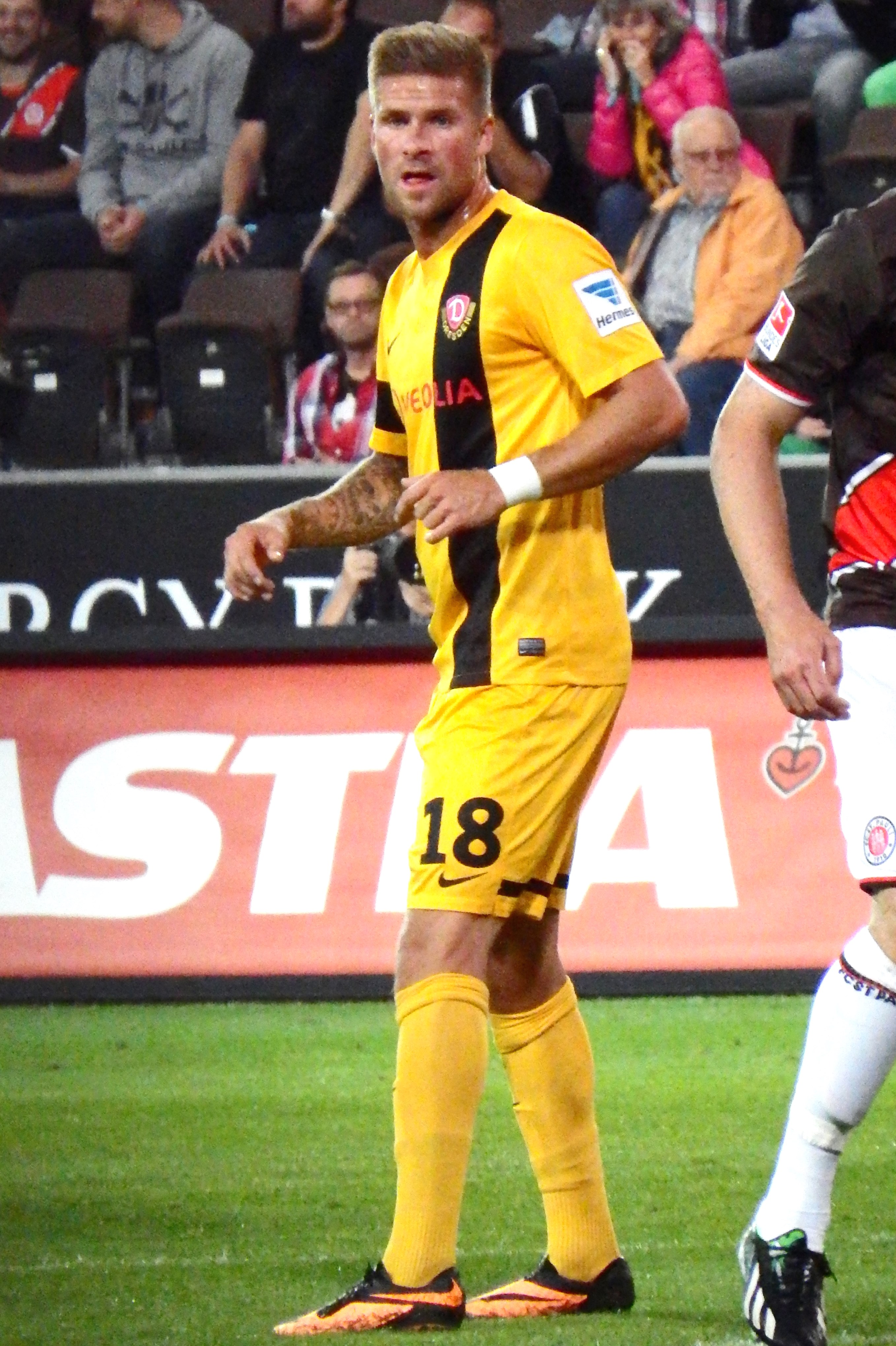
- Kempe with Dynamo Dresden in 2013

Personal information
- Full name: Tobias Kempe
- Date of birth: 27 June 1989 (age 37)
- Place of birth: Wesel, West Germany
- Height: 1.84 m (6 ft 0 in)
- Position: Midfielder

Youth career
- 1995–2000: TV Voerde
- 2000–2003: SuS 09 Dinslaken
- 2003–2005: Borussia Mönchengladbach
- 2005–2008: Werder Bremen

Senior career*
Years	Team	Apps	(Gls)
2008–2010	Werder Bremen II	46	(4)
2010–2012	Erzgebirge Aue	59	(4)
2012–2013	SC Paderborn	15	(3)
2013–2014	Dynamo Dresden	33	(4)
2014–2016	Darmstadt 98	55	(4)
2016–2017	1. FC Nürnberg	26	(3)
2017–2025	Darmstadt 98	213	(49)
Total		447	(71)

International career
2007	Germany U18	2	(0)
2008–2009	Germany U20	5	(1)
- * Club domestic league appearances and goals as of 24 May 2025

Tobias Kempe (born 27 June 1989) is a German professional footballer who plays as a midfielder. His father, Thomas was a professional footballer, as was his older brother, Dennis.

== Career ==
=== Erzgebirge Aue ===
On 4 June 2010, he joined FC Erzgebirge Aue on a two-year contract.

=== SC Paderborn ===
In March 2012, it was announced that Kempe would join SC Paderborn on a free transfer in the summer.

=== Dynamo Dresden ===
On 21 January 2013, Kempe joined Dynamo Dresden on an 18-month contract.

In January 2014, with his contract set to expire at the end of the season, he agreed to extend his contract with the club until summer 2017.

=== Darmstadt 98 ===
Following Dynamo Dresden's relegation to the 3. Liga, Kempe signed for newly promoted 2. Bundesliga club Darmstadt 98 on a two-year contract.

His contract was not extended at the end of the 2015–16 season and he left the club.

=== 1. FC Nürnberg ===
On 17 June 2016, Kempe agreed to sign for 2. Bundesliga club 1. FC Nürnberg. He suffered a torn muscle in his thigh in April 2017.

=== Return to Darmstadt 98 ===
In July 2017, Kempe returned to SV Darmstadt 98 after one season at 1. FC Nürnberg. He signed a three-year contract and the transfer fee paid to Nürnberg was reported as €750,000.

In May 2020, he extended his contract with Darmstadt until summer 2021.

In January 2021, his contract with the club was again extended until summer 2023.

On 28 April 2025, it was announced that his contract would not be extended beyond the end of the 2024–25 season, and hence he would leave the club after 8 years there, and despite tearing a ligament in his knee in the days leading up to the match, he made his final appearance for the club on the final day of the season, starting a 3–1 win over Jahn Regensburg.

== Personal life ==
He is the son of former professional footballer Thomas Kempe, who played in the Bundesliga for MSV Duisburg, VfB Stuttgart and VfL Bochum. He is also the younger brother of Dennis Kempe, who played for Karlsruher SC and Erzgebirge Aue amongst others.

== Career statistics ==
Appearances and goals by club, season and competition
Club	Season	League			Cup		Other		Total	
Club	Season	Division	Apps	Goals	Apps	Goals	Apps	Goals	Apps	Goals
Werder Bremen II	2008–09	3. Liga	12	1	—		—		12	1
Werder Bremen II	2009–10	3. Liga	34	3	—		—		34	3
Werder Bremen II	Total		46	4	0	0	0	0	46	4
Erzgebirge Aue	2010–11	2. Bundesliga	32	2	1	0	—		33	2
Erzgebirge Aue	2011–12	2. Bundesliga	27	2	1	0	—		28	2
Erzgebirge Aue	Total		59	4	2	0	0	0	61	4
SC Paderborn	2012–13	2. Bundesliga	15	3	0	0	—		15	3
Dynamo Dresden	2012–13	2. Bundesliga	11	0	0	0	1 (Note: Appearance in 2013 2. Bundesliga play-offs)	0	12	0
Dynamo Dresden	2013–14	2. Bundesliga	22	4	0	0	—		22	4
Dynamo Dresden	Total		33	4	0	0	1	0	34	4
Darmstadt 98	2014–15	2. Bundesliga	24	4	1	0	—		25	4
Darmstadt 98	2015–16	Bundesliga	31	0	3	0	—		34	0
Darmstadt 98	Total		55	4	4	0	0	0	59	4
1. FC Nürnberg	2016–17	2. Bundesliga	26	3	2	1	—		28	4
Darmstadt 98	2017–18	2. Bundesliga	30	11	1	0	—		31	11
Darmstadt 98	2018–19	2. Bundesliga	31	10	2	1	—		33	11
Darmstadt 98	2019–20	2. Bundesliga	27	7	1	0	—		28	7
Darmstadt 98	2020–21	2. Bundesliga	30	9	3	1	—		33	10
Darmstadt 98	2021–22	2. Bundesliga	30	6	0	0	—		30	6
Darmstadt 98	2022–23	2. Bundesliga	26	3	3	1	—		29	4
Darmstadt 98	2023–24	Bundesliga	24	3	0	0	—		24	3
Darmstadt 98	2024–25	2. Bundesliga	15	0	2	1	—		17	1
Darmstadt 98	Total		213	49	12	4	0	0	225	53
Career total			447	71	20	5	1	0	468	76
