= Alexander Brunst =

German footballer

Personal information
- Full name: Alexander Brunst-Zöllner
- Date of birth: 7 July 1995 (age 31)
- Place of birth: Neumünster, Germany
- Height: 1.95 m (6 ft 5 in)
- Position: Goalkeeper

Team information
- Current team: Darmstadt 98
- Number: 30

Youth career
- Olympia Neumünster
- –2008: TSV Gadeland
- 2008–2014: Hamburger SV

Senior career*
| Years | Team | Apps | (Gls) |
| 2013–2015 | Hamburger SV II | 25 | (0) |
| 2014–2015 | Hamburger SV | 0 | (0) |
| 2015–2017 | VfL Wolfsburg II | 52 | (0) |
| 2017–2020 | FC Magdeburg | 33 | (0) |
| 2020–2022 | Vejle | 40 | (0) |
| 2022– | Darmstadt 98 | 6 | (0) |

International career
| 2012–2013 | Germany U18 | 3 | (0) |
| 2015 | Germany U20 | 1 | (0) |
- * Club domestic league appearances and goals as of 21 May 2024

Alexander Brunst-Zöllner (born 7 July 1995) is a German professional footballer who plays as a goalkeeper for SV Darmstadt 98.

== Career ==
Brunst made his professional debut for 1. FC Magdeburg on 24 October 2017, starting in a home match in the second round of the 2017–18 DFB-Pokal against Borussia Dortmund.

After a trial, Brunst joined newly promoted Danish Superliga club Vejle Boldklub on 7 September 2020, signing a deal until the summer 2022. On 19 June 2022, Vejle confirmed that they had agreed to terminate Brunst's contract at the player's own request, as the German had expressed that he wanted to live closer to his family since he had recently become a father.

One day later, on 20 June 2022, Brunst joined 2. Bundesliga club SV Darmstadt 98 on a deal until June 2024.

== Career statistics ==
As of match played 12 May 2024

Appearances and goals by club, season and competition
| Club | Season | League | | | Cup | | Other | | Total | |
| Club | Season | Division | Apps | Goals | Apps | Goals | Apps | Goals | Apps | Goals |
|---|---|---|---|---|---|---|---|---|---|---|
| Hamburger SV II | 2013–14 | Regionalliga Nord | 1 | 0 | — | | — | | 1 | 0 |
| Hamburger SV II | 2014–15 | Regionalliga Nord | 24 | 0 | — | | — | | 24 | 0 |
| Hamburger SV II | Total | | 25 | 0 | — | | — | | 25 | 0 |
| Hamburger SV | 2014–15 | Bundesliga | 0 | 0 | 0 | 0 | 0 | 0 | 0 | 0 |
| VfL Wolfsburg II | 2015–16 | Regionalliga Nord | 29 | 0 | — | | — | | 29 | 0 |
| VfL Wolfsburg II | 2016–17 | Regionalliga Nord | 23 | 0 | — | | — | | 23 | 0 |
| VfL Wolfsburg II | Total | | 52 | 0 | — | | — | | 52 | 0 |
| FC Magdeburg | 2017–18 | 3. Liga | 5 | 0 | 1 | 0 | — | | 6 | 0 |
| FC Magdeburg | 2018–19 | 2. Bundesliga | 19 | 0 | 1 | 0 | — | | 20 | 0 |
| FC Magdeburg | 2019–20 | 3. Liga | 9 | 0 | 0 | 0 | — | | 9 | 0 |
| FC Magdeburg | Total | | 33 | 0 | 2 | 0 | — | | 35 | 0 |
| Vejle | 2020–21 | Danish Superliga | 19 | 0 | 3 | 0 | — | | 22 | 0 |
| Vejle | 2021–22 | Danish Superliga | 21 | 0 | 4 | 0 | — | | 25 | 0 |
| Vejle | Total | | 40 | 0 | 7 | 0 | — | | 47 | 0 |
| Darmstadt 98 | 2022–23 | 2. Bundesliga | 3 | 0 | 0 | 0 | — | | 3 | 0 |
| Darmstadt 98 | 2023–24 | Bundesliga | 3 | 0 | 0 | 0 | — | | 3 | 0 |
| Darmstadt 98 | 2024–25 | 2. Bundesliga | 0 | 0 | 0 | 0 | — | | 0 | 0 |
| Darmstadt 98 | 2025–26 | 2. Bundesliga | 0 | 0 | 0 | 0 | — | | 0 | 0 |
| Darmstadt 98 | Total | | 6 | 0 | 0 | 0 | — | | 6 | 0 |
| Career total | | | 156 | 0 | 9 | 0 | 0 | 0 | 165 | 0 |
