= Matthias Bader =

German footballer

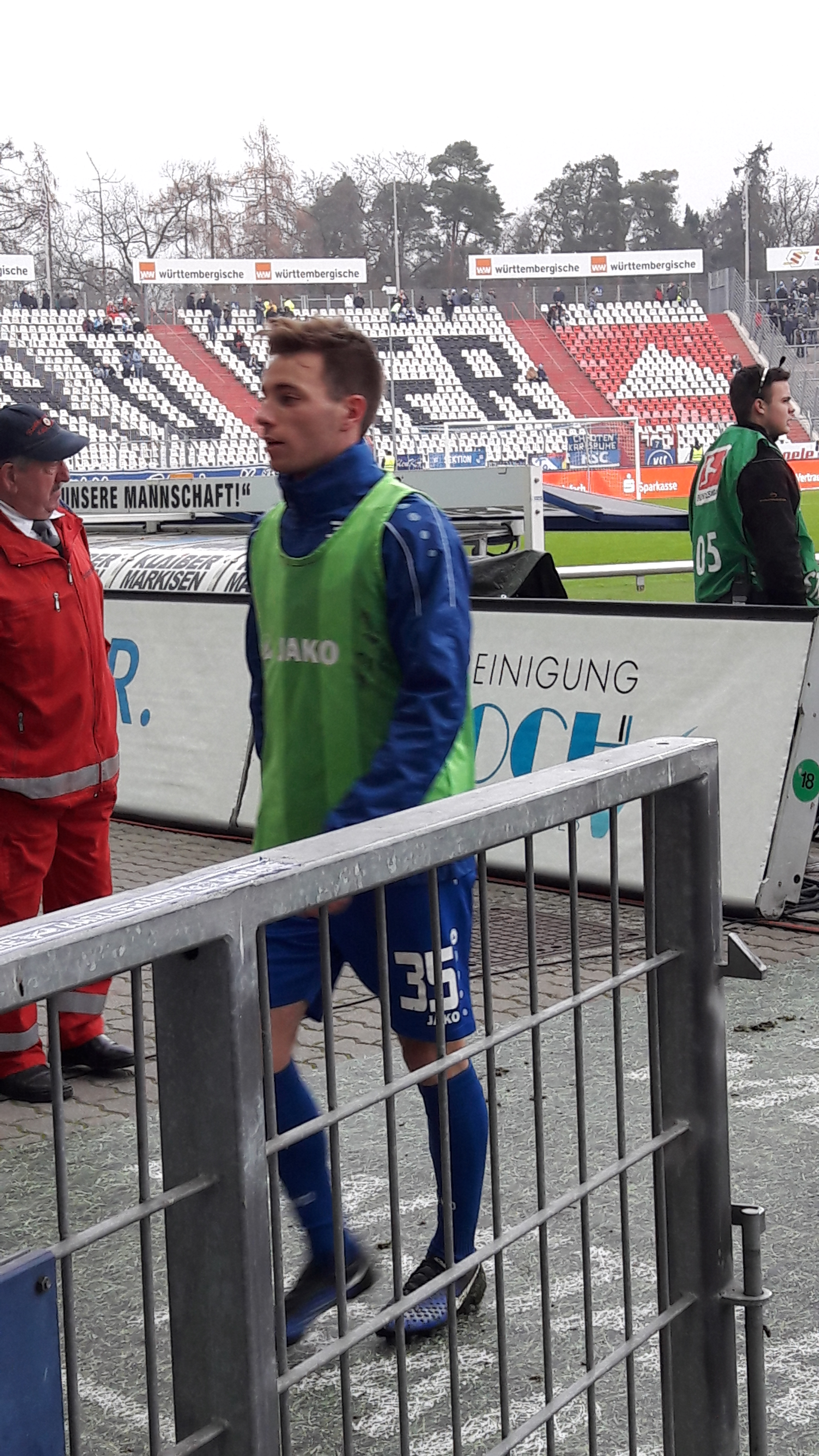
- Bader with Karlsruher SC in 2016

Personal information
- Full name: Matthias Bader
- Date of birth: 17 June 1997 (age 29)
- Place of birth: Pforzheim, Germany
- Height: 1.76 m (5 ft 9 in)
- Positions: Right-back; right wing-back

Team information
- Current team: Darmstadt 98
- Number: 26

Youth career
- 2006–2015: Karlsruher SC

Senior career*
Years	Team	Apps	(Gls)
2015–2018	Karlsruher SC	46	(0)
2018−2020	1. FC Köln	5	(0)
2020−	Darmstadt 98	124	(5)

International career^{‡}
2013	Germany U16	3	(0)
2013–2014	Germany U17	9	(0)
2014–2015	Germany U18	2	(0)
2015–2016	Germany U19	4	(0)
2016–2017	Germany U20	5	(0)
- * Club domestic league appearances and goals as of 18 May 2026 ‡ National team caps and goals as of 08:46, 4 June 2020 (UTC)

Matthias Bader (born 17 June 1997) is a German professional footballer who plays as a right-back or right wing-back for 2. Bundesliga club Darmstadt 98.

== Career statistics ==
As of match played 18 May 2024

Appearances and goals by club, season and competition
Club	Season	League			DFB-Pokal		Other		Total	
Club	Season	Division	Apps	Goals	Apps	Goals	Apps	Goals	Apps	Goals
Karlshruher	2016–17	2. Bundesliga	17	0	0	0	—	17	0	
Karlshruher	2017–18	2. Bundesliga	29	0	0	0	4 (Note: Appearances in Baden Cup and Relegation Play-offs)	0	33	0
Karlshruher	Total		46	0	0	0	4	0	50	0
Köln	2018–19	Bundesliga	4	0	0	0	0	0	4	0
Köln	2019–20	Bundesliga	1	0	1	0	0	0	2	0
Köln	Total		5	0	1	0	0	0	6	0
FC Köln II	2019–20	Regionalliga West	5	0	—		—		5	0
Darmstadt 98	2019–20	2. Bundesliga	12	1	0	0	—		12	1
Darmstadt 98	2020–21	2. Bundesliga	17	0	1	0	—		18	0
Darmstadt 98	2021–22	2. Bundesliga	30	1	1	0	—		31	1
Darmstadt 98	2022–23	2. Bundesliga	26	2	2	0	—		28	2
Darmstadt 98	2023–24	Bundesliga	24	1	0	0	—		24	1
Darmstadt 98	2024–25	2. Bundesliga	0	0	0	0	—		0	0
Darmstadt 98	Total		109	5	4	0	—		113	5
Career total			165	5	5	0	4	0	174	5
