= Aytaç Sulu =

German footballer

Personal information
- Date of birth: 11 December 1985 (age 40)
- Place of birth: Heidelberg, West Germany
- Height: 1.85 m (6 ft 1 in)
- Position: Defender

Youth career
- 1998–2003: SV Sandhausen

Senior career*
Years	Team	Apps	(Gls)
2003–2005	SV Sandhausen	10	(1)
2005–2007	Bahlinger SC	12	(1)
2007–2009	1899 Hoffenheim	38	(2)
2009–2011	VfR Aalen	62	(3)
2011–2012	Gençlerbirliği	2	(0)
2012–2013	SCR Altach	15	(2)
2013–2019	Darmstadt 98	161	(19)
2019	Samsunspor	12	(0)
2020	Carl Zeiss Jena	14	(3)
Total		326	(31)
- * Club domestic league appearances and goals

Aytaç Sulu (born 11 December 1985) is a German former professional footballer who played as a defender.

== Club career ==
In his youth, Sulu played for FV Nußloch, SG Heidelberg-Kirchheim and SV Sandhausen. In the 2004–05 season, he came into the first team of SV Sandhausen. He then moved to Bahlinger SC, from Verbandsliga Baden and got them promoted in the season he arrived. He became a true professional footballer with 1899 Hoffenheim, making most of his appearances for the second team.

In 2009, he reunited with Rainer Scharinger at VfR Aalen, whom was his coach with Sandausen, and Hoffenheim. He captained the team, and got them promoted into the 3. Liga. After a contract standoff, he left on a free transfer to the Turkish team, Gençlerbirliği. Due to his Turkish passport, he did not count as a foreign player for the team, but he only made a couple of appearances for the team. Following an unsuccessful year, he left the Turkish club on a free transfer. He again reunited with Scharinger who then managed the Austrian team SCR Altach, but lasted a couple of months before transferring in 2013 to SV Darmstadt 98.

=== Darmstadt 98 ===
Sulu's fortunes changed dramatically when he joined Darmstadt, coached by Dirk Schuster. When he joined them, they were one of the worst teams in the 3. Liga, and barely avoided relegation in their first season. Sulu had strong defensive performances, and became their captain for the 2013–14 season. Sulu captained the squad in a hugely successful season where they finished as runners-up in the 3. Liga, and were promoted to the 2. Bundesliga for the first time in 15 years.

Sulu remained Darmstadt's captain in their 2014–15 season, helping Darmstadt concede the fewest goals in the 2. Liga. Darmstadt came second in the 2. Bundesliga and were promoted to the Bundesliga for the first time in 33 years.

Sulu held on to the captain's armband for the 2015–16 Bundesliga season. He had an incredibly successful season for a team that struggled to avoid relegation. In his debut Bundesliga season, Sulu was universally heralded for his defensive displays and resilient play style. He scored seven headed goals during the season, a record for a defender in the Bundesliga.

=== Samsunspor ===
In 2019, Sulu left on a free transfer to join Turkish club Samsunspor.

=== Carl Zeiss Jena ===
On 30 January 2020, Sulu returned to Germany by joining Carl Zeiss Jena on a short-term deal. He left the club at the end of the season.

== Personal life ==
Sulu was born and raised in Germany to parents of Turkish descent. He only holds a Turkish passport and declared for the Turkey national team but he remained eligible for the Germany national team. He is a trained car salesman, and almost quit his footballing career to go back to car sales, before his successful move to Darmstadt.
