= Mathias Honsak =

Austrian footballer

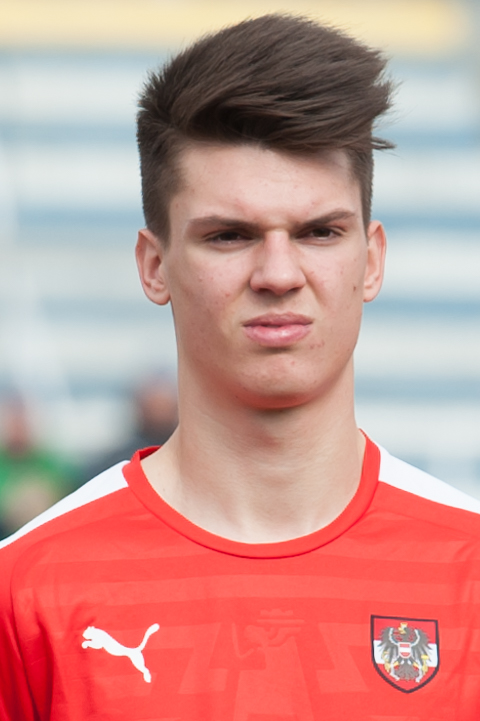
- Honsak with Austria U19 in 2015

Personal information
- Date of birth: 20 December 1996 (age 29)
- Place of birth: Vienna, Austria
- Height: 1.88 m (6 ft 2 in)
- Position: Left midfielder

Team information
- Current team: 1. FC Heidenheim
- Number: 17

Youth career
- 2004–2007: Floridsdorfer AC
- 2007–2011: Austria Wien
- 2011–2012: FC Stadlau

Senior career*
Years	Team	Apps	(Gls)
2013–2014	FC Stadlau	36	(11)
2014–2017	Liefering	42	(9)
2016–2017	→ Ried (loan)	38	(4)
2017–2019	Red Bull Salzburg	0	(0)
2017–2018	→ Rheindorf Altach (loan)	19	(3)
2018–2019	→ Holstein Kiel (loan)	25	(4)
2019–2024	Darmstadt 98	120	(14)
2024–	1. FC Heidenheim	55	(7)

International career^{‡}
2014–2015	Austria U19	7	(1)
2017–2019	Austria U21	17	(7)
2025–	Austria	1	(0)
- * Club domestic league appearances and goals as of 15:30, 20 September 2026 (UTC) ‡ National team caps and goals as of 10 June 2025

Mathias Honsak (born 20 December 1996) is an Austrian professional footballer who plays as a left midfielder for German 2. Bundesliga club 1. FC Heidenheim and the Austria national team.

== Career ==
In July 2018, Honsak joined 2. Bundesliga side Holstein Kiel on loan for the 2018–19 season. After the loan spell, he signed a three-year deal with SV Darmstadt 98 on 5 July 2019.

On 6 May 2024, Honsak signed a three-year contract with 1. FC Heidenheim, effective in July 2024.

== Career statistics ==
=== Club ===
As of match played 20 September 2026

Appearances and goals by club, season and competition
Club	Season	League			National cup (Note: Includes Austrian Cup, DFB-Pokal)		Europe		Other		Total	
Club	Season	Division	Apps	Goals	Apps	Goals	Apps	Goals	Apps	Goals	Apps	Goals
FC Stadlau	2013–14	Wiener Stadtliga	36	11	—		—		—		36	11
Liefering	2014–15	Austrian First League	19	5	—		—		—		19	5
Liefering	2015–15	Austrian First League	16	0	—		—		—		16	0
Liefering	2017–18	Austrian First League	7	4	—		—		—		7	4
Liefering	Total		42	9	—		—		—		42	9
Ried (loan)	2015–16	Austrian Bundesliga	14	1	—		—		—		14	1
Ried (loan)	2016–17	Austrian Bundesliga	24	3	—		—		—		24	3
Ried (loan)	Total		38	4	—		—		—		38	4
Rheindof Altach (loan)	2017–18	Austrian Bundesliga	19	3	2	0	—		—		21	3
Holstein Kiel (loan)	2017–18	2. Bundesliga	25	4	3	0	—		—		28	4
Darmstadt 98	2019–20	2. Bundesliga	23	2	1	0	—		—		24	2
Darmstadt 98	2020–21	2. Bundesliga	27	4	3	1	—		—		30	5
Darmstadt 98	2021–22	2. Bundesliga	32	3	0	0	—		—		32	3
Darmstadt 98	2022–23	2. Bundesliga	15	4	1	2	—		—		16	6
Darmstadt 98	2023–24	Bundesliga	23	1	1	0	—		—		24	1
Darmstadt 98	Total		120	14	6	3	—		—		126	17
1. FC Heidenheim	2024–25	Bundesliga	22	5	2	0	9 (Note: Appearances in UEFA Conference League)	2	2 (Note: Appearances in Bundesliga relegation play-offs)	2	35	9
1. FC Heidenheim	2025–26	Bundesliga	27	2	2	1	—		—		29	3
1. FC Heidenheim	2026–27	2. Bundesliga	6	0	1	0	—		—		7	0
1. FC Heidenheim	Total		55	7	5	1	9	2	2	2	71	12
Career total			335	52	16	4	9	2	2	2	362	60

=== International ===
As of match played 10 June 2025

Appearances and goals by national team and year
National team	Year	Apps	Goals
Austria	2025	1	0
Total		1	0
