= Matej Maglica =

Croatian footballer

Personal information
- Date of birth: 25 September 1998 (age 28)
- Place of birth: Slavonski Brod, Croatia
- Height: 1.98 m (6 ft 6 in)
- Position: Centre-back

Team information
- Current team: Kocaelispor
- Number: 6

Youth career
- Marsonia
- 2015–2016: Backnang

Senior career*
Years	Team	Apps	(Gls)
2016–2019	TSG Backnang II	33	(8)
2017–2019	TSG Backnang	35	(2)
2019–2020	SV Göppingen	19	(4)
2020–2021	VfB Stuttgart II	40	(0)
2021–2022	VfB Stuttgart	1	(0)
2022	→ St. Gallen (loan)	16	(1)
2022–2023	St. Gallen	31	(1)
2023–2024	VfB Stuttgart	0	(0)
2023–2024	→ Darmstadt 98 (loan)	26	(1)
2024–2026	Darmstadt 98	48	(6)
2026–	Kocaelispor	1	(1)

International career
2023	Croatia U23	1	(0)
- * Club domestic league appearances and goals as of 24 August 2026

Matej Maglica (born 25 September 1998) is a Croatian professional footballer who plays as a centre-back for Süper Lig club Kocaelispor.

== Club career ==
A youth product of the Croatian club Marsonia, Maglica moved to Germany with the youth academy of TSG Backnang in 2015. He was promoted to their reserves, and eventually their senior team in 2017 before transferring to SV Göppingen. He joined VfB Stuttgart II in June 2020, and after a successful debut season signed an extension on 2 April 2021. He made his professional debut with Stuttgart in a 1–0 Bundesliga loss to Arminia Bielefeld on 6 November 2021.

On 3 January 2022, Maglica joined St. Gallen on loan until the end of the season. On 7 June 2022, St. Gallen exercised their option to purchase Maglica's contract.

On 15 June 2023, Stuttgart activated the buy-back option in Maglica's St Gallen transfer with the defender returning to Germany on a two-year contract.

On 2 July 2023, Maglica joined Darmstadt 98 on a year long loan until June 2024. He scored his first goal for the club with a header against Borussia Moenchengladbach on 17 September 2023 in the 10th minute of the game, before being sent off in the second half. On 30 October 2023, Darmstadt 98 announced that the loan deal will be converted to a permanent contract, signing af contract until June 2027.

== Personal life ==
Maglica is eligible to represent Bosnia and Herzegovina. His father is from Bosanski Šamac and he spent part of his childhood in Odžak.

== Career statistics ==
As of match played 18 May 2024

Appearances and goals by club, season and competition
Club	Season	League			National cup		Europe		Other		Total	
Club	Season	Division	Apps	Goals	Apps	Goals	Apps	Goals	Apps	Goals	Apps	Goals
TSG Backnang	2016–17	Verbandsliga Württemberg	7	0	0	0	—		—		7	0
TSG Backnang	2017–18	Oberliga Baden-Württemberg	10	0	—		—		—		10	0
TSG Backnang	2018–19	Oberliga Baden-Württemberg	18	2	—		—		—		18	2
TSG Backnang	Total		35	2	—		—		—		35	2
1. Göppinger SV	2019–20	Oberliga Baden-Württemberg	19	4	1	0	—		—		20	4
VfB Stuttgart II	2020–21	Regionalliga Südwest	26	0	1	0	—		—		27	0
VfB Stuttgart II	2021–22	Regionalliga Südwest	14	0	—		—		—		14	0
VfB Stuttgart II	Total		40	0	1	0	—		—		41	0
VfB Stuttgart	2021–22	Bundesliga	1	0	0	0	—		—		1	0
St. Gallen (loan)	2021–22	Swiss Super League	16	1	2	1	—		—		18	2
St. Gallen	2022–23	Swiss Super League	31	1	3	1	—		—		34	2
VfB Stuttgart	2023–24	Bundesliga	0	0	0	0	—		0	0	0	0
Darmstadt 98 (loan)	2023–24	Bundesliga	26	1	1	0	—		—		27	1
Darmstadt 98	2024–25	2. Bundesliga	0	0	0	0	—		0	0	0	0
Career total			168	9	8	2	0	0	0	0	176	11

== Honours ==
Individual

- Swiss Super League Team of the Season: 2022-23
