= Henry Crosthwaite =

German footballer (born 2002)

Personal information
- Full name: Henry Jon Crosthwaite
- Date of birth: 14 October 2002 (age 24)
- Place of birth: Giessen, Germany
- Height: 1.75 m (5 ft 9 in)
- Position: Right winger

Team information
- Current team: BFC Dynamo
- Number: 29

Youth career
- FC Cleeberg
- –2018: TSG Wieseck
- 2018–2021: Darmstadt 98

Senior career*
| Years | Team | Apps | (Gls) |
| 2020–2024 | Darmstadt 98 | 1 | (0) |
| 2021–2022 | → Rot-Weiß Koblenz (loan) | 32 | (2) |
| 2022–2023 | → FCA Walldorf (loan) | 32 | (4) |
| 2023–2024 | → Hallescher FC (loan) | 13 | (1) |
| 2024– | BFC Dynamo | 15 | (2) |
- * Club domestic league appearances and goals as of 1 January 2025

Henry Jon Crosthwaite (born 14 October 2002) is a German professional footballer who plays as a right winger for BFC Dynamo.

== Career ==
Crosthwaite began his youth career at FC Cleeberg and TSG Wieseck, before joining the academy of Darmstadt 98 in 2018. In July 2020, he signed his first professional contract with the club, lasting three years until June 2023. He made his professional debut for Darmstadt in the 2. Bundesliga on 16 May 2021, coming on as a substitute in the 87th minute for Serdar Dursun against 1. FC Heidenheim. The home match finished as a 5–1 win.

On 30 August 2022, Crosthwaite was loaned to FCA Walldorf in the fourth-tier Regionalliga Südwest. On 7 July 2023, he moved on a new loan to Hallescher FC in 3. Liga.

On 10 July 2024, Crosthwaite signed with BFC Dynamo in Regionalliga.
