= 2016–17 FC Ingolstadt 04 season =

FC Ingolstadt
2016–17 season
- Chairman: Peter Jackwerth
- Manager: Markus Kauczinski (until 6 November); Michael Henke (interim, 8–12 November); Maik Walpurgis (from 12 November)
- Stadium: Audi Sportpark
- Bundesliga: 17th (relegated)
- DFB-Pokal: Second round
- Top goalscorer: League: Almog Cohen (7); All: Almog Cohen (7)
- Highest home attendance: 15,200
- Lowest home attendance: 13,521
- Average home league attendance: 14,601
- Biggest win: Ingolstadt 3–1 Hamburg; Frankfurt 0–2 Ingolstadt
- Biggest defeat: Hoffenheim 5–2 Ingolstadt; Wolfsburg 3–0 Ingolstadt
| Home colours | Away colours | Third colours |

The 2016–17 FC Ingolstadt 04 season is the 13th season in the football club's history and 2nd consecutive and overall season in the top flight of German football, the Bundesliga, having been promoted from the 2. Bundesliga in 2015. FC Ingolstadt will also participate in this season's edition of the domestic cup, the DFB-Pokal. It is the 7th overall season for FC Ingolstadt in the Audi Sportpark, located in Ingolstadt, Germany. The season covers a period from 1 July 2016 to 30 June 2017.

== Background ==
On 6 May 2016, Markus Kauczinski was confirmed to replace Ralph Hasenhüttl as head coach for the season.

== Players ==
=== Squad ===
Note: Flags indicate national team as defined under FIFA eligibility rules; some limited exceptions apply. Players may hold more than one non-FIFA nationality.

| No. | Pos. | Nation | Player |
|---|---|---|---|
| 1 | GK | NOR | Ørjan Nyland |
| 3 | MF | GER | Anthony Jung (on loan from RB Leipzig) |
| 6 | MF | USA | Alfredo Morales |
| 7 | FW | AUS | Mathew Leckie |
| 8 | MF | BRA | Roger |
| 9 | FW | GER | Moritz Hartmann |
| 10 | MF | GER | Pascal Groß |
| 11 | FW | PAR | Darío Lezcano |
| 13 | FW | GER | Robert Leipertz |
| 14 | MF | GER | Stefan Lex |
| 16 | FW | AUT | Lukas Hinterseer |
| 18 | DF | FRA | Romain Brégerie |

| No. | Pos. | Nation | Player |
|---|---|---|---|
| 19 | MF | GER | Max Christiansen |
| 21 | MF | GER | Sonny Kittel |
| 22 | MF | GER | Nico Rinderknecht |
| 24 | GK | CRO | Fabijan Buntić |
| 29 | DF | AUT | Markus Suttner |
| 31 | MF | GER | Maurice Multhaup |
| 32 | MF | COD | Marcel Tisserand |
| 33 | DF | SUI | Florent Hadergjonaj |
| 34 | DF | CMR | Marvin Matip (Captain) |
| 35 | GK | DEN | Martin Hansen |
| 36 | MF | ISR | Almog Cohen |
| 39 | GK | GER | Christian Ortag |

=== Transfers ===
==== In ====
| No. | Pos. | Nation | Player |
|---|---|---|---|
| 13 | FW | GER | Robert Leipertz (from Schalke 04) |
| 17 | DF | GER | Hauke Wahl (from SC Paderborn) |
| 21 | MF | GER | Sonny Kittel (from Eintracht Frankfurt) |
| 22 | MF | GER | Nico Rinderknecht (from Eintracht Frankfurt) |
| 24 | GK | CRO | Fabijan Buntić (from VfB Stuttgart U19) |
| 35 | GK | DEN | Martin Hansen (from ADO Den Haag) |
| — | MF | GER | Kerem Bülbül (from Hertha BSC II) |

==== Out ====
| No. | Pos. | Nation | Player |
|---|---|---|---|
| 1 | GK | AUT | Ramazan Özcan (to Bayer Leverkusen) |
| 5 | DF | GER | Benjamin Hübner (to 1899 Hoffenheim) |
| 15 | DF | BRA | Danilo (released) |
| 20 | DF | KAZ | Konstantin Engel (released) |
| 21 | DF | GER | Danny da Costa (to Bayer Leverkusen) |
| 25 | FW | GER | Elias Kachunga (on loan to Huddersfield Town) |
| — | MF | GER | Kerem Bülbül (on loan to Hansa Rostock) |

== Friendly matches ==
Win Draw Loss

| 20 July 2016 Friendly | Stuttgarter Kickers (Germany) | 2–1 | (Germany) FC Ingolstadt | Blaubeuren, Germany |
| 18:00 CEST (UTC+2) | Pfeiffer 9'; Scioscia 22' | Report | Hartmann 40' | Stadium: Sportanlage SV Pappelau-Beiningen |

| 23 July 2016 Friendly | Dynamo Dresden (Germany) | 2–2 | (Germany) FC Ingolstadt | Oberkotzau, Germany |
| 15:30 CEST (UTC+2) | Kutschke 6'; Modica 20' | Report | Groß 41'; Lex 83' | Stadium: Sportplatz Hohe Wart; Attendance: 1,300 |

| 29 July 2016 Friendly | FC Ingolstadt (Germany) | 0–1 | (England) Huddersfield Town | Schwaz, Austria |
| 18:30 CEST (UTC+2) | | Report | Hefele 86' | Stadium: Silberstadt-Arena Schwaz |
Note: This match was part of the 2016 Audi Schanzer Sommer Tour.

| 2 August 2016 Friendly | FC Ingolstadt (Germany) | 0–1 | (Italy) Torino | Schwaz, Austria |
| 18:30 CEST (UTC+2) | | Report | Belotti 8' | Stadium: Silberstadt-Arena Schwaz; Attendance: 500 |
Note: This match was part of the 2016 Audi Schanzer Sommer Tour.

| 10 August 2016 Friendly | VfB Eichstätt (Germany) | 0–7 | (Germany) FC Ingolstadt | Eichstätt, Germany |
| 18:30 CEST (UTC+2) | | Report | Lex 29', 40', 44'; Lezcano 46', 69'; Leckie 58'; Hartmann 72' | Stadium: Westpark-Stadion |

| 13 August 2016 Friendly | Werder Bremen (Germany) | 1–0 | (Germany) FC Ingolstadt | Lohne, Germany |
| 15:30 CEST (UTC+2) | Bartels 42' | Report | | Stadium: Heinz-Dettmer-Stadion; Attendance: 3,000; Referee: Frank Willenborg |

== Competitions ==
Win Draw Loss

=== Overview ===
| Competition | First match | Last match | Starting round | Final position | Record | | | | | | | |
| Competition | First match | Last match | Starting round | Final position | Pld | W | D | L | GF | GA | GD | Win % |
|---|---|---|---|---|---|---|---|---|---|---|---|---|
| Bundesliga | 27 August 2016 | 20 May 2017 | Matchday 1 | 17th (relegated) | 34 | 8 | 8 | 18 | 36 | 57 | −21 | 23.53 |
| DFB-Pokal | 21 August 2016 | 25 October 2016 | First round | Second round | 2 | 0 | 2 | 0 | 0 | 0 | +0 | 0.00 |
| Total | | | | | 36 | 8 | 10 | 18 | 36 | 57 | −21 | 22.22 |

Last updated: 27 May 2017
Source: Competitions

=== Bundesliga ===
==== League table ====
| Pos | Team | Pld | W | D | L | GF | GA | GD | Pts | Qualification or relegation |
|---|---|---|---|---|---|---|---|---|---|---|
| 14 | Hamburger SV | 34 | 10 | 8 | 16 | 33 | 61 | −28 | 38 | |
| 15 | Mainz 05 | 34 | 10 | 7 | 17 | 44 | 55 | −11 | 37 | |
| 16 | VfL Wolfsburg (O) | 34 | 10 | 7 | 17 | 34 | 52 | −18 | 37 | Qualification for the relegation play-offs |
| 17 | FC Ingolstadt (R) | 34 | 8 | 8 | 18 | 36 | 57 | −21 | 32 | Relegation to 2. Bundesliga |
| 18 | Darmstadt 98 (R) | 34 | 7 | 4 | 23 | 28 | 63 | −35 | 25 | Relegation to 2. Bundesliga |

Source: DFB
Rules for classification: 1) Points; 2) Goal difference; 3) Goals scored; 4) Head-to-head points; 5) Head-to-head goal difference; 6) Head-to-head away goals scored; 7) Away goals scored; 8) Play-off.
(O) Play-off winners; (R) Relegated

==== Results summary ====
| Overall | | | | | | | | Home | | | | | | Away | | | | | |
| Pld | W | D | L | GF | GA | GD | Pts | W | D | L | GF | GA | GD | W | D | L | GF | GA | GD |
|---|---|---|---|---|---|---|---|---|---|---|---|---|---|---|---|---|---|---|---|
| 34 | 8 | 8 | 18 | 36 | 57 | −21 | 32 | 4 | 5 | 8 | 21 | 30 | −9 | 4 | 3 | 10 | 15 | 27 | −12 |

Last updated: 27 May 2017.
Source: Bundesliga

==== Results by round ====
| Round | 1 | 2 | 3 | 4 | 5 | 6 | 7 | 8 | 9 | 10 | 11 | 12 | 13 | 14 | 15 | 16 | 17 | 18 | 19 | 20 | 21 | 22 | 23 | 24 | 25 | 26 | 27 | 28 | 29 | 30 | 31 | 32 | 33 | 34 |
|---|---|---|---|---|---|---|---|---|---|---|---|---|---|---|---|---|---|---|---|---|---|---|---|---|---|---|---|---|---|---|---|---|---|---|
| Ground | A | H | A | H | A | H | A | H | A | H | A | H | A | H | A | H | A | H | A | H | A | H | A | H | A | H | A | H | A | H | A | H | A | H |
| Result | D | L | L | L | L | L | L | D | L | L | W | D | L | W | W | L | L | W | L | L | W | L | L | D | L | W | W | W | L | L | D | D | D | D |
| Position | 10 | 16 | 15 | 15 | 16 | 17 | 18 | 17 | 17 | 17 | 17 | 17 | 18 | 17 | 16 | 17 | 17 | 16 | 17 | 17 | 17 | 17 | 17 | 17 | 17 | 17 | 17 | 17 | 17 | 17 | 17 | 17 | 17 | 17 |

Updated to match(es) played on 27 May 2017. Source: Bundesliga
A = Away; H = Home; W = Win; D = Draw; L = Loss

==== Matches ====
| 27 August 2016 1 | Hamburger SV | 1–1 | FC Ingolstadt | Hamburg |
| 15:30 CEST (UTC+2) | Wood 30'; Sakai (yellow card) 32'; Djourou (yellow card) 89' | Report | Suttner (yellow card) 7'; Morales (yellow card) 32'; Hinterseer 79' | Stadium: Volksparkstadion; Attendance: 50,107; Referee: Marco Fritz |

| 10 September 2016 2 | FC Ingolstadt | 0–2 | Hertha BSC | Ingolstadt |
| 15:30 CEST (UTC+2) | Morales (yellow card) 6'; Levels (yellow card) 63'; Suttner (yellow card) 88' | Report | Ibišević 8'; Esswein (yellow card) 74'; Schieber 86' | Stadium: Audi Sportpark; Attendance: 14,100; Referee: Jochen Drees |

| 17 September 2016 3 | Bayern Munich | 3–1 | FC Ingolstadt | Munich |
| 15:30 CEST (UTC+2) | Lewandowski 12'; Alonso 50'; Thiago (yellow card) 81'; Rafinha 84' | Report | Lezcano 8'; Tisserand (yellow card) 59'; Lex (yellow card) 72' | Stadium: Allianz Arena; Attendance: 75,000; Referee: Patrick Ittrich |

| 20 September 2016 4 | FC Ingolstadt | 0–2 | Eintracht Frankfurt | Ingolstadt |
| 20:00 CEST (UTC+2) | | Report | Abraham 45+2'; Oczipka 50'; Seferovic (yellow card) 82' | Stadium: Audi Sportpark; Attendance: 14,259; Referee: Sascha Stegemann |

| 24 September 2016 5 | Borussia Mönchengladbach | 2–0 | FC Ingolstadt | Mönchengladbach |
| 15:30 CEST (UTC+2) | Stindl 42'; Hahn (yellow card) 53'; Elvedi (yellow card) 65'; Wendt 76' | Report | Leckie (yellow card) 4'; Hinterseer (yellow card) 66'; Levels (yellow card) 85' | Stadium: BORUSSIA-PARK; Attendance: 50,112; Referee: Bastian Dankert |

| 1 October 2016 6 | FC Ingolstadt | 1–2 | 1899 Hoffenheim | Ingolstadt |
| 15:30 CEST (UTC+2) | Matip (yellow card) 58'; Hinterseer 90+5' (pen.) | Report | Wagner 11'; Demirbay 35'; Hübner (yellow card) 72'; Rupp (yellow card) 90+4' | Stadium: Audi Sportpark; Attendance: 13,844; Referee: Robert Kampka |

| 15 October 2016 7 | 1. FC Köln | 2–1 | FC Ingolstadt | Cologne |
| 15:30 CEST (UTC+2) | Modeste 28', 39' (pen.); Lehmann (yellow card) 32'; Höger (yellow card) 75'; Sørensen (yellow card) 85' | Report | Suttner (yellow card) 45+1'; Hinterseer (yellow card) 87', (goal) 90' (pen.); Levels (yellow card) 90+2' | Stadium: RheinEnergieSTADION; Attendance: 49,200; Referee: Tobias Welz |

| 22 October 2016 8 | FC Ingolstadt | 3–3 | Borussia Dortmund | Ingolstadt |
| 15:30 CEST (UTC+2) | Cohen 6'; Lezcano 24', 60' | Report | Aubameyang 59'; Ramos 69', (yellow card) 71'; Pulisic 90+1' | Stadium: Audi Sportpark; Attendance: 15,200; Referee: Felix Zwayer |

| 29 October 2016 9 | Mainz 05 | 2–0 | FC Ingolstadt | Mainz |
| 15:30 CEST (UTC+2) | Mallı 51' (pen.); Jairo (yellow card) 64'; Öztunalı 85' | Report | Christiansen (yellow card) 72' (yellow-red card) 86' | Stadium: OPEL ARENA; Attendance: 24,197; Referee: Manuel Gräfe |

| 5 November 2016 10 | FC Ingolstadt | 0–2 | FC Augsburg | Ingolstadt |
| 15:30 CET (UTC+1) | Lex (yellow card) 12'; Brégerie (yellow card) 84'; Levels (red card) 89' | Report | Max (yellow card) 62'; Bobadilla 85'; Altıntop 90' | Stadium: Audi Sportpark; Attendance: 15,200; Referee: Jochen Drees |

| 19 November 2016 11 | Darmstadt 98 | 0–1 | FC Ingolstadt | Darmstadt |
| 15:30 CET (UTC+1) | Ben-Hatira (yellow card) 4' | Report | Suttner (yellow card) 35'; Roger (yellow card) 61'; Tisserand (yellow card) 66'; Hartmann 68'; Hadergjonaj (yellow card) 73' | Stadium: Jonathan-Heimes-Stadion am Böllenfalltor; Attendance: 15,000; Referee: Christian Dingert |

| 26 November 2016 12 | FC Ingolstadt | 1–1 | VfL Wolfsburg | Ingolstadt |
| 15:30 CET (UTC+1) | Jung 31'; Cohen (yellow card) 33'; Roger (yellow card) 52' | Report | Guilavogui (yellow card) 51'; Caligiuri 78' | Stadium: Audi Sportpark; Attendance: 13,521; Referee: Daniel Siebert |

| 3 December 2016 13 | Werder Bremen | 2–1 | FC Ingolstadt | Bremen |
| 15:30 CET (UTC+1) | Kruse 24'; Bartels 76' | Report | Tisserand (yellow card) 30'; Suttner 58', (yellow card) 90+4'; Groß (yellow card) 79' | Stadium: Weser-Stadion; Attendance: 38,438; Referee: Tobias Stieler |

| 10 December 2016 14 | FC Ingolstadt | 1–0 | RB Leipzig | Ingolstadt |
| 15:30 CET (UTC+1) | Roger 12'; Leckie (yellow card) 90+4' (yellow-red card) 90+4'; Hadergjonaj (yellow card) 90+5' | Report | Sabitzer (yellow card) 34'; Werner (yellow card) 61'; Ilsanker (yellow card) 90+1'; Selke (yellow card) 90+4' | Stadium: Audi Sportpark; Attendance: 15,200; Referee: Markus Schmidt |

| 18 December 2016 15 | Bayer Leverkusen | 1–2 | FC Ingolstadt | Leverkusen |
| 17:30 CET (UTC+1) | Aránguiz (yellow card) 35' (yellow-red card) 49'; Jedvaj (yellow card) 58'; Mehmedi 63' | Report | Morales 26'; Cohen 73'; Tisserand (yellow card) 76'; Matip (yellow card) 85' | Stadium: BayArena; Attendance: 25,075; Referee: Frank Willenborg |

| 21 December 2016 16 | FC Ingolstadt | 1–2 | SC Freiburg | Ingolstadt |
| 20:00 CET (UTC+1) | Morales (yellow card) 20'; Roger (yellow card) 42'; Suttner 53'; Tisserand (yellow card) 67'; Matip (yellow card) 85' | Report | Niederlechner 34' (pen.), 41'; Stenzel (yellow card) 88'; Bulut (yellow card) 89' | Stadium: Audi Sportpark; Attendance: 13,904; Referee: Sascha Stegemann |

| 21 January 2017 17 | Schalke 04 | 1–0 | FC Ingolstadt | Gelsenkirchen |
| 15:30 CET (UTC+1) | Nastasić (yellow card) 79'; Burgstaller 90+2' | Report | | Stadium: VELTINS-Arena; Attendance: 58,004; Referee: Harm Osmers |

| 28 January 2017 18 | FC Ingolstadt | 3–1 | Hamburger SV | Ingolstadt |
| 15:30 CET (UTC+1) | Groß 14'; Suttner 22'; Cohen 47' (pen.) | Report | Papadopoulos (yellow card) 44'; Sakai 63', (yellow card) 77' | Stadium: Audi Sportpark; Attendance: 14,549; Referee: Markus Schmidt |

| 4 February 2017 19 | Hertha BSC | 1–0 | FC Ingolstadt | Berlin |
| 15:30 CET (UTC+1) | Haraguchi 1'; Ibišević (yellow card) 47'; Darida (yellow card) 89' | Report | Groß (yellow card) 39'; Morales (yellow card) 58' | Stadium: Olympiastadion Berlin; Attendance: 33,425; Referee: Frank Willenborg |

| 11 February 2017 20 | FC Ingolstadt | 0–2 | Bayern Munich | Ingolstadt |
| 15:30 CET (UTC+1) | Brégerie (yellow card) 73'; Groß (yellow card) 76' | Report | Lewandowski (yellow card) 73'; Vidal 90'; Robben 90+1' | Stadium: Audi Sportpark; Attendance: 15,200; Referee: Felix Zwayer |

| 18 February 2017 21 | Eintracht Frankfurt | 0–2 | FC Ingolstadt | Frankfurt |
| 15:30 CET (UTC+1) | Mascarell (yellow card) 23'; Abraham (red card) 34'; Rebić (yellow card) 35'; Hector (yellow card) 68'; Chandler (yellow card) 78' | Report | Brégerie 26'; Groß 69' (pen.); Leckie (red card) 81' | Stadium: Commerzbank-Arena; Attendance: 46,300; Referee: Guido Winkmann |

| 26 February 2017 22 | FC Ingolstadt | 0–2 | Borussia Mönchengladbach | Ingolstadt |
| 15:30 CET (UTC+1) | Jung (yellow card) 23'; Tisserand (yellow card) 63' | Report | Stindl 60'; Hahn 90+1' | Stadium: Audi Sportpark; Attendance: 15,200; Referee: Christian Dingert |

| 4 March 2017 23 | 1899 Hoffenheim | 5–2 | FC Ingolstadt | Sinsheim |
| 15:30 CET (UTC+1) | Rudy 17', (yellow card) 34'; Hübner (yellow card) 58', (goal) 88'; Szalai 62', 79'; Kramarić 77' | Report | Cohen 38'; Süle 60' (o.g.); Suttner (yellow card) 65'; Kittel (yellow card) 84' | Stadium: WIRSOL Rhein-Neckar-Arena; Attendance: 23,028; Referee: Bastian Dankert |

| 11 March 2017 24 | FC Ingolstadt | 2–2 | 1. FC Köln | Ingolstadt |
| 18:30 CET (UTC+1) | Suttner (yellow card) 37'; Kittel (yellow card) 38'; Lezcano 42'; Brégerie (yellow card) 61', (goal) 69'; Groß (yellow card) 90+2' | Report | Modeste 15' (pen.), 60'; Olkowski (yellow card) 28'; Heintz (yellow card) 83'; Lehmann (yellow card) 90+3' | Stadium: Audi Sportpark; Attendance: 15,200; Referee: Felix Zwayer |

| 17 March 2017 25 | Borussia Dortmund | 1–0 | FC Ingolstadt | Dortmund |
| 20:30 CET (UTC+1) | Aubameyang 14'; Schmelzer (yellow card) 90' | Report | Lezcano (yellow card) 35'; Hadergjonaj (yellow card) 54'; Suttner (yellow card) 81' | Stadium: SIGNAL IDUNA PARK; Attendance: 81,360; Referee: Daniel Siebert |

| 2 April 2017 26 | FC Ingolstadt | 2–1 | Mainz 05 | Ingolstadt |
| 15:30 CEST (UTC+2) | Brégerie 10'; Matip (yellow card) 59'; Hadergjonaj (yellow card) 65', (goal) 73'; Tisserand (yellow card) 85'; Hansen (yellow card) 90+3' | Report | Balogun (yellow card) 33'; Ramalho (yellow card) 68'; Matip 71' (o.g.); Latza (yellow card) 76' | Stadium: Audi Sportpark; Attendance: 14,000; Referee: Patrick Ittrich |

| 5 April 2017 27 | FC Augsburg | 2–3 | FC Ingolstadt | Augsburg |
| 20:00 CEST (UTC+2) | Koo (yellow card) 45'; Morávek (yellow card) 66'; Verhaegh 76' (pen.); Hinteregger (yellow card) 80'; Altıntop 81' | Report | Kittel 24'; Cohen 35', 67'; Hadergjonaj (yellow card) 64'; Roger (yellow card) 75' | Stadium: WWK ARENA; Attendance: 29,528; Referee: Marco Fritz |

| 9 April 2017 28 | FC Ingolstadt | 3–2 | Darmstadt 98 | Ingolstadt |
| 17:30 CEST (UTC+2) | Groß 19'; Cohen 68'; Suttner 72', (yellow card) 75'; Brégerie (red card) 87' | Report | Vrančić 33', 39' (pen.); Čolak (yellow card) 64' (yellow-red card) 87' | Stadium: Audi Sportpark; Attendance: 14,081; Referee: Manuel Gräfe |

| 15 April 2017 29 | VfL Wolfsburg | 3–0 | FC Ingolstadt | Wolfsburg |
| 15:30 CEST (UTC+2) | Bazoer (yellow card) 11'; Knoche (yellow card) 36'; Suttner 45+1' (o.g.); Mallı 68'; Gómez 80' | Report | Suttner (yellow card) 13'; Matip (yellow card) 41'; Cohen (yellow card) 86' | Stadium: VOLKSWAGEN ARENA; Attendance: 26,374; Referee: Tobias Stieler |

| 22 April 2017 30 | FC Ingolstadt | 2–4 | Werder Bremen | Ingolstadt |
| 15:30 CEST (UTC+2) | Lezcano 32'; Tisserand (yellow card) 45'; Groß 62' (pen.), (yellow card) 78'; Christiansen (yellow card) 70' | Report | Kruse 45+1' (pen.), 81', 87', 90+4'; Moisander (yellow card) 50'; Sané (yellow card) 64' | Stadium: Audi Sportpark; Attendance: 15,200; Referee: Markus Schmidt |

| 29 April 2017 31 | RB Leipzig | 0–0 | FC Ingolstadt | Leipzig |
| 15:30 CEST (UTC+2) | Upamecano (yellow card) 18'; Ilsanker (yellow card) 26'; Poulsen (yellow card) 59' | Report | Lezcano (yellow card) 28'; Roger (yellow card) 43'; Tisserand (yellow card) 48'; Morales (yellow card) 59' (yellow-red card) 86'; Lex (yellow card) 64' | Stadium: Red Bull Arena; Attendance: 41,053; Referee: Daniel Siebert |

| 6 May 2017 32 | FC Ingolstadt | 1–1 | Bayer Leverkusen | Ingolstadt |
| 15:30 CEST (UTC+2) | Leckie (yellow card) 23'; Kittel 73' | Report | Aránguiz (yellow card) 35'; Volland (yellow card) 60'; Henrichs (yellow card) 68'; Havertz 78' | Stadium: Audi Sportpark; Attendance: 14,351; Referee: Harm Osmers |

| 13 May 2017 33 | SC Freiburg | 1–1 | FC Ingolstadt | Freiburg im Breisgau |
| 15:30 CEST (UTC+2) | Philipp 31'; Gulde (yellow card) 71'; Abrashi (yellow card) 90+2' | Report | Lezcano 43', (yellow card) 69'; Hadergjonaj (yellow card) 45'; Roger (yellow card) 61' | Stadium: Schwarzwald-Stadion; Attendance: 24,000; Referee: Bastian Dankert |

| 20 May 2017 34 | FC Ingolstadt | 1–1 | Schalke 04 | Ingolstadt |
| 15:30 CEST (UTC+2) | Groß 41' (pen.); Lezcano (yellow card) 47' | Report | Avdijaj 2'; Stambouli (red card) 63'; Tekpetey (yellow card) 90+2' | Stadium: Audi Sportpark; Attendance: 15,200; Referee: Frank Willenborg |

=== DFB-Pokal ===
| 21 August 2016 First round | Erzgebirge Aue | 0–0 (a.e.t.) (7–8 p) | FC Ingolstadt | Aue |
| 18:30 CEST (UTC+2) | | Report | Levels (yellow card) 54'; Groß (yellow card) 116' | Stadium: Sparkassen-Erzgebirgsstadion; Attendance: 6,650; Referee: Sören Storks |
| | Penalties |
| | Rizzuto (penalty scored); Köpke (penalty scored); Kvesić (penalty scored); Pepić (penalty scored); Nazarov (penalty scored); Breitkreuz (penalty scored); Hertner (penalty scored); Adler (penalty missed) | | (penalty scored) Cohen; (penalty scored) Suttner; (penalty scored) Leckie; (penalty scored) Groß; (penalty scored) Hinterseer; (penalty scored) Matip; (penalty scored) Roger; (penalty scored) Levels |

| 25 October 2016 Second round | Eintracht Frankfurt | 0–0 (a.e.t.) (4–1 p) | FC Ingolstadt | Frankfurt |
| 20:45 CEST (UTC+2) | Gaćinović (yellow card) 29'; Fabián (yellow card) 79' (yellow-red card) 88' | Report | Lex (yellow card) 48'; Leckie (yellow card) 76'; Groß (yellow card) 101' | Stadium: Commerzbank-Arena; Attendance: 6,300; Referee: Harm Osmers |
| | Penalties |
| | Huszti (penalty scored); Oczipka (penalty scored); Mascarell (penalty scored); Hasebe (penalty scored) | | (penalty scored) Cohen; (penalty missed) Christiansen; (penalty missed) Hartmann |

== Statistics ==
=== Appearances and goals ===
| No. | Pos | Nat | Player | Total | | Bundesliga | | DFB-Pokal | |
| No. | Pos | Nat | Player | Apps | Goals | Apps | Goals | Apps | Goals |
Goalkeepers
| 1 | GK | (Norway) NOR | Ørjan Nyland | 13 | 0 | 11+1 | 0 | 1 | 0 |
| 24 | GK | (Croatia) CRO | Fabijan Buntić | 0 | 0 | 0 | 0 | 0 | 0 |
| 35 | GK | (Denmark) DEN | Martin Hansen | 24 | 0 | 23 | 0 | 1 | 0 |
| 39 | GK | (Germany) GER | Christian Ortag | 0 | 0 | 0 | 0 | 0 | 0 |
Defenders
| 18 | DF | (France) FRA | Romain Brégerie | 18 | 3 | 17 | 3 | 1 | 0 |
| 28 | DF | (Germany) GER | Tobias Levels | 12 | 0 | 8+2 | 0 | 2 | 0 |
| 29 | DF | (Austria) AUT | Markus Suttner | 33 | 4 | 31 | 4 | 1+1 | 0 |
| 33 | DF | (Switzerland) SUI | Florent Hadergjonaj | 25 | 1 | 25 | 1 | 0 | 0 |
| 34 | DF | (Cameroon) CMR | Marvin Matip | 35 | 0 | 33 | 0 | 2 | 0 |
Midfielders
| 3 | MF | (Germany) GER | Anthony Jung | 17 | 1 | 8+8 | 1 | 1 | 0 |
| 6 | MF | (United States) USA | Alfredo Morales | 28 | 1 | 20+7 | 1 | 1 | 0 |
| 8 | MF | (Brazil) BRA | Roger | 31 | 1 | 26+4 | 1 | 1 | 0 |
| 10 | MF | (Germany) GER | Pascal Groß | 35 | 5 | 31+2 | 5 | 2 | 0 |
| 14 | MF | (Germany) GER | Stefan Lex | 15 | 0 | 2+11 | 0 | 1+1 | 0 |
| 19 | MF | (Germany) GER | Max Christiansen | 12 | 0 | 4+7 | 0 | 1 | 0 |
| 21 | MF | (Germany) GER | Sonny Kittel | 21 | 2 | 7+13 | 2 | 0+1 | 0 |
| 22 | MF | (Germany) GER | Nico Rinderknecht | 0 | 0 | 0 | 0 | 0 | 0 |
| 31 | MF | (Germany) GER | Maurice Multhaup | 1 | 0 | 0+1 | 0 | 0 | 0 |
| 32 | MF | (Democratic Republic of the Congo) COD | Marcel Tisserand | 28 | 0 | 27+1 | 0 | 0 | 0 |
| 36 | MF | (Israel) ISR | Almog Cohen | 33 | 7 | 29+2 | 7 | 1+1 | 0 |
Forwards
| 7 | FW | (Australia) AUS | Mathew Leckie | 32 | 0 | 25+5 | 0 | 2 | 0 |
| 9 | FW | (Germany) GER | Moritz Hartmann | 16 | 1 | 12+2 | 1 | 1+1 | 0 |
| 11 | FW | (Paraguay) PAR | Darío Lezcano | 35 | 6 | 27+6 | 6 | 2 | 0 |
| 13 | FW | (Germany) GER | Robert Leipertz | 6 | 0 | 0+6 | 0 | 0 | 0 |
| 16 | FW | (Austria) AUT | Lukas Hinterseer | 29 | 3 | 8+20 | 3 | 0+1 | 0 |
Players transferred out during the season
| 17 | DF | (Germany) GER | Hauke Wahl | 1 | 0 | 0 | 0 | 1 | 0 |

Last updated: 20 May 2017
Source: Competitions

=== Goalscorers ===
| Rank | No. | Pos | Nat | Name | Bundesliga | DFB-Pokal | Total |
|---|---|---|---|---|---|---|---|
| 1 | 36 | MF | (Israel) | Almog Cohen | 7 | 0 | 7 |
| 2 | 11 | FW | (Paraguay) | Darío Lezcano | 6 | 0 | 6 |
| 3 | 10 | MF | (Germany) | Pascal Groß | 5 | 0 | 5 |
| 4 | 29 | DF | (Austria) | Markus Suttner | 4 | 0 | 4 |
| 5 | 16 | FW | (Austria) | Lukas Hinterseer | 3 | 0 | 3 |
| 5 | 18 | DF | (France) | Romain Brégerie | 3 | 0 | 3 |
| 7 | 21 | MF | (Germany) | Sonny Kittel | 2 | 0 | 2 |
| 8 | 3 | MF | (Germany) | Anthony Jung | 1 | 0 | 1 |
| 8 | 6 | MF | (United States) | Alfredo Morales | 1 | 0 | 1 |
| 8 | 8 | MF | (Brazil) | Roger | 1 | 0 | 1 |
| 8 | 9 | FW | (Germany) | Moritz Hartmann | 1 | 0 | 1 |
| 8 | 33 | DF | (Switzerland) | Florent Hadergjonaj | 1 | 0 | 1 |
| Own goal | | | | | 1 | 0 | 1 |
| Totals | | | | | 36 | 0 | 36 |

Last updated: 20 May 2017

=== Clean sheets ===
| Rank | No. | Pos | Nat | Name | Bundesliga | DFB-Pokal | Total |
|---|---|---|---|---|---|---|---|
| 1 | 35 | GK | (Denmark) | Martin Hansen | 4* | 1 | 5 |
| 2 | 1 | GK | (Norway) | Ørjan Nyland | 1* | 1 | 2 |
| Totals | | | | | 5 | 2 | 7 |

* Includes one shared clean sheet against RB Leipzig. Last updated: 29 April 2017

=== Disciplinary record ===
| No. | Pos | Nat | Player | Bundesliga | | | DFB-Pokal | | | Total | | |
| No. | Pos | Nat | Player | Booked | (yellow card) (yellow-red card) | Sent off (straight red) | Booked | (yellow card) (yellow-red card) | Sent off (straight red) | Booked | (yellow card) (yellow-red card) | Sent off (straight red) |
| 3 | MF | (Germany) | Anthony Jung | 1 | 0 | 0 | 0 | 0 | 0 | 1 | 0 | 0 |
| 6 | MF | (United States) | Alfredo Morales | 4 | 1 | 0 | 0 | 0 | 0 | 4 | 1 | 0 |
| 7 | FW | (Australia) | Mathew Leckie | 2 | 1 | 1 | 1 | 0 | 0 | 3 | 1 | 1 |
| 8 | MF | (Brazil) | Roger | 6 | 0 | 0 | 0 | 0 | 0 | 6 | 0 | 0 |
| 10 | MF | (Germany) | Pascal Groß | 5 | 0 | 0 | 2 | 0 | 0 | 7 | 0 | 0 |
| 11 | FW | (Paraguay) | Darío Lezcano | 4 | 0 | 0 | 0 | 0 | 0 | 4 | 0 | 0 |
| 14 | MF | (Germany) | Stefan Lex | 3 | 0 | 0 | 1 | 0 | 0 | 4 | 0 | 0 |
| 16 | FW | (Austria) | Lukas Hinterseer | 2 | 0 | 0 | 0 | 0 | 0 | 2 | 0 | 0 |
| 18 | DF | (France) | Romain Brégerie | 3 | 0 | 1 | 0 | 0 | 0 | 3 | 0 | 1 |
| 19 | MF | (Germany) | Max Christiansen | 1 | 1 | 0 | 0 | 0 | 0 | 1 | 1 | 0 |
| 21 | MF | (Germany) | Sonny Kittel | 2 | 0 | 0 | 0 | 0 | 0 | 2 | 0 | 0 |
| 28 | DF | (Germany) | Tobias Levels | 3 | 0 | 1 | 1 | 0 | 0 | 4 | 0 | 1 |
| 29 | DF | (Austria) | Markus Suttner | 10 | 0 | 0 | 0 | 0 | 0 | 10 | 0 | 0 |
| 32 | MF | (Democratic Republic of the Congo) | Marcel Tisserand | 9 | 0 | 0 | 0 | 0 | 0 | 9 | 0 | 0 |
| 33 | DF | (Switzerland) | Florent Hadergjonaj | 6 | 0 | 0 | 0 | 0 | 0 | 6 | 0 | 0 |
| 34 | DF | (Cameroon) | Marvin Matip | 5 | 0 | 0 | 0 | 0 | 0 | 5 | 0 | 0 |
| 35 | GK | (Denmark) | Martin Hansen | 1 | 0 | 0 | 0 | 0 | 0 | 1 | 0 | 0 |
| 36 | MF | (Israel) | Almog Cohen | 2 | 0 | 0 | 0 | 0 | 0 | 2 | 0 | 0 |
| Totals | | | | 69 | 3 | 3 | 5 | 0 | 0 | 74 | 3 | 3 |

Last updated: 20 May 2017
