= 2016–17 RB Leipzig season =

RB Leipzig
2016–17 season
- Sporting director: Ralf Rangnick
- Chairman: Oliver Mintzlaff
- Manager: Ralph Hasenhüttl
- Stadium: Red Bull Arena
- Bundesliga: 2nd
- DFB-Pokal: First round
- Top goalscorer: League: Timo Werner (21 goals); All: Timo Werner (21 goals)
- Highest home attendance: 42,558
- Lowest home attendance: 35,721
- Average home league attendance: 41,454
- Biggest win: Hamburg 0–4 Leipzig; Leipzig 4–0 Darmstadt; Leipzig 4–0 Freiburg
- Biggest defeat: Bayern 3–0 Leipzig; Leipzig 0–3 Hamburg; Bremen 3–0 Leipzig
Home colours	Away colours	Third colours

The 2016–17 RB Leipzig season was the 8th season in the football club's history and first season in the top flight of German football, the Bundesliga, having been promoted from the 2. Bundesliga in 2016. RB Leipzig also participated in the season's edition of the domestic cup, the DFB-Pokal. The season covers a period from 1 July 2016 to 30 June 2017.

== Review ==
=== Background ===
On 6 May 2016, Ralph Hasenhüttl was appointed to replace Ralf Rangnick as the head coach. On 8 May 2016, RB Leipzig was directly promoted to the Bundesliga after securing second position in the 2015–16 2. Bundesliga.

=== December ===
On 3 December, Leipzig faced Schalke 04 at home on matchday 13. The match finished as a 2–1 win for RB Leipzig. RBL opened the scoring in the second minute from the penalty spot via Timo Werner. Two minutes later, Yussuf Poulsen missed two opportunities in a row to extend the lead for Leipzig. Poulsen again missed an opportunity in the 29th minute, missing a metre away from goal. Two minutes later, Sead Kolašinac scored the equaliser for Schalke, after the ball was parried by RB goalkeeper Péter Gulácsi. Two minutes into the second half, Sead Kolašinac scored an own goal from a free kick from Leipzig's Emil Forsberg. Leipzig had further opportunities to score, but failed to capitalise. This includes a chance for Poulsen in the 64th minute from a corner, from Marcel Halstenberg in the 74th minute with a header onto the bar, and two opportunities for Naby Keïta in the 81st and 83rd minute. Leipzig goalkeeper Gulácsi preserved their lead with three consecutive saves in the 77th minute. The final opportunities fell to Poulsen in the 84th minute and Emil Forsberg in the 88th, yet both were unable to extend the lead. This proved to be enough, as Leipzig secured their 8th consecutive victory and maintained their position at the top of the table.

== Players ==
=== Squad ===
Note: Flags indicate national team as defined under FIFA eligibility rules; some limited exceptions apply. Players may hold more than one non-FIFA nationality.

No.	Pos.	Nation	Player
1	GK	SUI	Fabio Coltorti
2	MF	PHI	John-Patrick Strauß
3	MF	BRA	Bernardo
4	DF	HUN	Willi Orbán (Vice-captain)
6	MF	GER	Rani Khedira
7	MF	AUT	Marcel Sabitzer
8	MF	GUI	Naby Keïta
9	FW	DEN	Yussuf Poulsen
10	FW	SWE	Emil Forsberg
11	FW	GER	Timo Werner
13	MF	AUT	Stefan Ilsanker
14	DF	GER	Dominik Franke
16	DF	GER	Lukas Klostermann
17	DF	FRA	Dayot Upamecano

No.	Pos.	Nation	Player
19	MF	SCO	Oliver Burke
20	DF	GER	Benno Schmitz
21	GK	GER	Marius Müller
22	GK	GER	Benjamin Bellot
23	DF	GER	Marcel Halstenberg
24	MF	GER	Dominik Kaiser (captain)
25	MF	POL	Kamil Wojtkowski
27	FW	GER	Davie Selke
31	MF	GER	Diego Demme
32	GK	HUN	Péter Gulácsi
33	DF	GER	Marvin Compper
36	DF	GER	Ken Gipson
38	FW	GER	Federico Palacios Martínez

=== Transfers ===
==== In ====
No.	Pos.	Nation	Player
35	MF	HUN	Zsolt Kalmár (loan return from FSV Frankfurt)
2	DF	GER	Benno Schmitz (from FC Red Bull Salzburg)
11	FW	GER	Timo Werner (€10 million) (from VfB Stuttgart)
23	GK	GER	Marius Müller (€1.7 million) (from 1. FC Kaiserslautern)
8	MF	GUI	Naby Keïta (from FC Red Bull Salzburg)
19	MF	SCO	Oliver Burke (£13 million) (from Nottingham Forest)
17	DF	FRA	Dayot Upamecano (€10 million) (from FC Red Bull Salzburg)

==== Out ====
No.	Pos.	Nation	Player
17	FW	GER	Nils Quaschner (on loan to VfL Bochum)
25	MF	AUT	Stefan Hierländer (to SK Sturm Graz)
39	DF	AUT	Georg Teigl (to FC Augsburg)
—	FW	ISR	Omer Damari (on loan to Maccabi Haifa)
3	MF	GER	Anthony Jung (on loan to FC Ingolstadt)
18	FW	USA	Terrence Boyd (to Darmstadt 98)

== Friendly matches ==
Win Draw Loss

17 July 2016 Friendly	1. FC Frankfurt	0–10	RB Leipzig	Frankfurt (Oder), Germany
15:30 CEST (UTC+2)		Report	Werner 5', 25'; Selke 16', 41', 43'; Keïta 37'; Weiss-Motz 50' (o.g.); Boyd 53'; Beiersdorf 71'; Bruno 78'	Stadium: Stadion der Freundschaft; Attendance: 3,420; Referee: Marcel Riemer

20 July 2016 Friendly	SSV Markranstädt	0–9	RB Leipzig	Markranstädt, Germany
18:00 CEST (UTC+2)		Report	Werner 24', 42'; Compper 49', 60'; Klostermann 51'; Kaiser 64'; Dadashov 71'; Selke 80', 84'	Stadium: Stadion am Bad; Attendance: 1,896; Referee: Patrick Kluge

23 July 2016 Friendly	RB Leipzig	3–0	Viktoria Berlin	Leipzig, Germany
15:30 CEST (UTC+2)	Werner 10'; Selke 28', 44'	Report		Stadium: RB-Trainingszentrum Cottaweg; Attendance: 1,538; Referee: Alexander Sather

27 July 2016 Friendly	RB Leipzig	2–0	Würzburger Kickers	Markranstädt, Germany
17:00 CEST (UTC+2)	Boyd 44'; Poulsen 75'	Report		Stadium: Stadion am Bad; Attendance: 2,091; Referee: Lasse Koslowski

4 August 2016 Friendly	RB Leipzig	0–0	Torino	Kufstein, Austria
18:30 CEST (UTC+2)		Report		Stadium: Kufstein Arena; Attendance: 1,300

6 August 2016 Friendly	RB Leipzig	3–2	Eibar	Grassau, Germany
18:30 CEST (UTC+2)	Sabitzer 73'; Poulsen 78'; Elgezabal 86' (o.g.)	Report	Bebé 30', 33'	Stadium: Sportanlage ASV Grassau; Attendance: 686; Referee: Tobias Reichel

9 August 2016 Friendly	RB Leipzig	4–4	FC Liefering	Grassau, Germany
11:30 CEST (UTC+2)	Nukan 24'; Bruno 25'; Keïta 70'; Poulsen 79' (pen.)	Report	Berisha 7', 17', 20'; Meister 54'	Stadium: Sportanlage ASV Grassau

14 August 2016 Friendly	RB Leipzig	1–1	Real Betis	Leipzig, Germany
17:00 CEST (UTC+2)	Halstenberg 63'	Report	Castro 69' (pen.)	Stadium: Red Bull Arena; Attendance: 13,198; Referee: Lasse Koslowski

== Competitions ==
Win Draw Loss

=== Overview ===
Competition	First match	Last match	Starting round	Final position	Record							
Competition	First match	Last match	Starting round	Final position	Pld	W	D	L	GF	GA	GD	Win %
Bundesliga	28 August 2016	20 May 2017	Matchday 1	2nd	34	20	7	7	66	39	+27	58.82
DFB-Pokal	20 August 2016	20 August 2016	First round	First round	1	0	1	0	2	2	+0	0.00
Total					35	20	8	7	68	41	+27	57.14

Last updated: 27 May 2017
Source: Competitions

=== Bundesliga ===
==== League table ====
Pos	Team	Pld	W	D	L	GF	GA	GD	Pts	Qualification or relegation
1	Bayern Munich (C)	34	25	7	2	89	22	+67	82	Qualification for the Champions League group stage
2	RB Leipzig	34	20	7	7	66	39	+27	67	Qualification for the Champions League group stage
3	Borussia Dortmund	34	18	10	6	72	40	+32	64	Qualification for the Champions League group stage
4	1899 Hoffenheim	34	16	14	4	64	37	+27	62	Qualification for the Champions League play-off round
5	1. FC Köln	34	12	13	9	51	42	+9	49	Qualification for the Europa League group stage (Note: Since the winners of the 2016–17 DFB-Pokal, Borussia Dortmund, qualified for the Champions League based on league position, the Europa League group stage spot was passed to the sixth-placed team, Hertha BSC; and the Europa League third qualifying round spot was passed to the seventh-placed team, SC Freiburg.)

Source: DFB
Rules for classification: 1) Points; 2) Goal difference; 3) Goals scored; 4) Head-to-head points; 5) Head-to-head goal difference; 6) Head-to-head away goals scored; 7) Away goals scored; 8) Play-off.
(C) Champions

==== Results summary ====
Overall								Home						Away					
Pld	W	D	L	GF	GA	GD	Pts	W	D	L	GF	GA	GD	W	D	L	GF	GA	GD
34	20	7	7	66	39	+27	67	12	2	3	35	16	+19	8	5	4	31	23	+8

Last updated: 27 May 2017.
Source: Bundesliga

==== Results by round ====
Round	1	2	3	4	5	6	7	8	9	10	11	12	13	14	15	16	17	18	19	20	21	22	23	24	25	26	27	28	29	30	31	32	33	34
Ground	A	H	A	H	A	H	A	H	A	H	A	A	H	A	H	A	H	H	A	H	A	H	A	H	A	H	A	H	H	A	H	A	H	A
Result	D	W	W	D	D	W	W	W	W	W	W	W	W	L	W	L	W	W	L	L	W	W	D	L	L	W	W	W	W	D	D	W	L	D
Position	8	5	3	6	7	5	3	2	2	2	1	1	1	2	2	2	2	2	2	2	2	2	2	2	2	2	2	2	2	2	2	2	2	2

Updated to match(es) played on 27 May 2017. Source: Bundesliga
A = Away; H = Home; W = Win; D = Draw; L = Loss

==== Matches ====
28 August 2016 1	1899 Hoffenheim	2–2	RB Leipzig	Sinsheim
17:30 CEST (UTC+2)	Vogt (yellow card) 22'; Schär (yellow card) 51'; Rupp 55'; Uth 83'	Report	Orban (yellow card) 20'; Compper (yellow card) 54'; Kaiser 58'; Ilsanker (yellow card) 74'; Demme (yellow card) 79'; Sabitzer 90'	Stadium: WIRSOL Rhein-Neckar-Arena; Attendance: 24,188; Referee: Tobias Stieler

10 September 2016 2	RB Leipzig	1–0	Borussia Dortmund	Leipzig
18:30 CEST (UTC+2)	Orban (yellow card) 48'; Werner (yellow card) 54'; Keïta 89'	Report	Castro (yellow card) 40'; Bartra (yellow card) 59'	Stadium: Red Bull Arena; Attendance: 42,558; Referee: Wolfgang Stark

17 September 2016 3	Hamburger SV	0–4	RB Leipzig	Hamburg
15:30 CEST (UTC+2)	Sakai (yellow card) 8'; Spahić (yellow card) 13'; Djourou (yellow card) 51'; Adler (yellow card) 65'; Wood (yellow card) 70'	Report	Forsberg 66' (pen.); Werner 72', 77'; Compper (yellow card) 74'; Selke 90+2'	Stadium: Volksparkstadion; Attendance: 52,998; Referee: Robert Kampka

21 September 2016 4	RB Leipzig	1–1	Borussia Mönchengladbach	Leipzig
20:00 CEST (UTC+2)	Werner 6'; Gulácsi (yellow card) 73'	Report	Vestergaard (yellow card) 45'; Johnson 84'; Stindl (yellow card) 89'	Stadium: Red Bull Arena; Attendance: 42,558; Referee: Manuel Gräfe

25 September 2016 5	1. FC Köln	1–1	RB Leipzig	Cologne
17:45 CEST (UTC+2)	Osako 25', (yellow card) 54'	Report	Burke 5'; Orban (yellow card) 39'; Bernardo (yellow card) 90+2'	Stadium: RheinEnergieSTADION; Attendance: 48,500; Referee: Benjamin Cortus
Note: The match was originally scheduled to start at 17:30, but was delayed 15 minutes due to a blockade preventing RB Leipzig's bus from entering the stadium.

30 September 2016 6	RB Leipzig	2–1	FC Augsburg	Leipzig
20:30 CEST (UTC+2)	Forsberg 11'; Poulsen 52'	Report	Ji 14'; Koo (yellow card) 26'; Kačar (yellow card) 53'; Hinteregger (yellow card) 84'	Stadium: Red Bull Arena; Attendance: 35,721; Referee: Harm Osmers

16 October 2016 7	VfL Wolfsburg	0–1	RB Leipzig	Wolfsburg
17:30 CEST (UTC+2)	Casteels (yellow card) 17'; Arnold (yellow card) 90+3'	Report	Halstenberg (yellow card) 69'; Forsberg 70'	Stadium: VOLKSWAGEN ARENA; Attendance: 30,000; Referee: Sascha Stegemann

23 October 2016 8	RB Leipzig	3–1	Werder Bremen	Leipzig
15:30 CEST (UTC+2)	Kaiser (yellow card) 14'; Forsberg (yellow card) 23'; Keïta (yellow card) 32', (goal) 42', 74'; Demme (yellow card) 90+4'; Selke 90+5'	Report	Gebre Selassie (yellow card) 36'; Fritz (yellow card) 44'; Gnabry 76'; Moisander (yellow card) 90+4'	Stadium: Red Bull Arena; Attendance: 42,558; Referee: Robert Hartmann

29 October 2016 9	Darmstadt 98	0–2	RB Leipzig	Darmstadt
15:30 CEST (UTC+2)	Gondorf (yellow card) 3'; Schipplock (yellow card) 21'; Höhn (yellow card) 77'; Ben-Hatira (yellow card) 86'	Report	Poulsen (yellow card) 24'; Sabitzer 57', 81'; Compper (yellow card) 67'	Stadium: Jonathan-Heimes-Stadion am Böllenfalltor; Attendance: 16,400; Referee: Wolfgang Stark

6 November 2016 10	RB Leipzig	3–1	Mainz 05	Leipzig
15:30 CET (UTC+1)	Werner 3', 44'; Forsberg 21'	Report	Brosinski (yellow card) 54'; Bell 74', (yellow card) 80'; Ramalho (yellow card) 85'	Stadium: Red Bull Arena; Attendance: 42,558; Referee: Marco Fritz

18 November 2016 11	Bayer Leverkusen	2–3	RB Leipzig	Leverkusen
20:30 CET (UTC+1)	Kampl 1'; Brandt 45+2'; Toprak (yellow card) 73'	Report	Baumgartlinger 4' (o.g.); Orban (yellow card) 51', (goal) 81'; Ilsanker (yellow card) 53'; Keïta (yellow card) 56'; Forsberg 67'	Stadium: BayArena; Attendance: 27,752; Referee: Felix Brych

25 November 2016 12	SC Freiburg	1–4	RB Leipzig	Freiburg im Breisgau
20:30 CET (UTC+1)	Niederlechner 15'; Stenzel (yellow card) 18'; Höfler (yellow card) 63'	Report	Keïta 2'; Werner 21', 35'; Orban (yellow card) 32'; Schmitz (yellow card) 42'; Poulsen (yellow card) 49'; Sabitzer 79'	Stadium: Schwarzwald-Stadion; Attendance: 24,000; Referee: Benjamin Brand

3 December 2016 13	RB Leipzig	2–1	Schalke 04	Leipzig
18:30 CET (UTC+1)	Werner 2' (pen.); Kolašinac 47' (o.g.); Halstenberg (yellow card) 73'	Report	Fährmann (yellow card) 1'; Kolašinac 31'; Nastasić (yellow card) 39'; Schöpf (yellow card) 49'; Höwedes (yellow card) 51'; Bentaleb (yellow card) 80'	Stadium: Red Bull Arena; Attendance: 42,558; Referee: Bastian Dankert

10 December 2016 14	FC Ingolstadt	1–0	RB Leipzig	Ingolstadt
15:30 CET (UTC+1)	Roger 12'; Leckie (yellow card) 90+4' (yellow-red card) 90+4'; Hadergjonaj (yellow card) 90+5'	Report	Sabitzer (yellow card) 34'; Werner (yellow card) 61'; Ilsanker (yellow card) 90+1'; Selke (yellow card) 90+4'	Stadium: Audi Sportpark; Attendance: 15,200; Referee: Markus Schmidt

17 December 2016 15	RB Leipzig	2–0	Hertha BSC	Leipzig
15:30 CET (UTC+1)	Werner 40', (yellow card) 59'; Orban 62'	Report	Stark (yellow card) 73'; Lustenberger (yellow card) 78'; Darida (yellow card) 82'	Stadium: Red Bull Arena; Attendance: 42,558; Referee: Marco Fritz

21 December 2016 16	Bayern Munich	3–0	RB Leipzig	Munich
20:00 CET (UTC+1)	Thiago 17'; Alonso 25'; Lewandowski 45' (pen.); Vidal (yellow card) 56'	Report	Forsberg (red card) 30'; Sabitzer (yellow card) 58'	Stadium: Allianz Arena; Attendance: 75,000; Referee: Felix Zwayer

21 January 2017 17	RB Leipzig	3–0	Eintracht Frankfurt	Leipzig
18:30 CET (UTC+1)	Compper 6'; Werner 45+4'; Vallejo 67' (o.g.); Selke (yellow card) 71'	Report	Hrádecký (red card) 3'; Rebić (yellow card) 15'; Mascarell (yellow card) 69'	Stadium: Red Bull Arena; Attendance: 42,558; Referee: Deniz Aytekin

28 January 2017 18	RB Leipzig	2–1	1899 Hoffenheim	Leipzig
15:30 CET (UTC+1)	Poulsen (yellow card) 35'; Werner 38'; Sabitzer 77'; Compper (yellow card) 84'; Selke (yellow card) 90+2'	Report	Amiri 18', (yellow card) 25'; Wagner (red card) 60'; Szalai (yellow card) 88'; Hübner (yellow card) 90'	Stadium: Red Bull Arena; Attendance: 39,633; Referee: Wolfgang Stark

4 February 2017 19	Borussia Dortmund	1–0	RB Leipzig	Dortmund
18:30 CET (UTC+1)	Aubameyang 35', (yellow card) 90+4'	Report	Bernardo (yellow card) 22'; Upamecano (yellow card) 72'; Compper (yellow card) 81'	Stadium: SIGNAL IDUNA PARK; Attendance: 81,360; Referee: Tobias Stieler

11 February 2017 20	RB Leipzig	0–3	Hamburger SV	Leipzig
15:30 CET (UTC+1)	Werner (yellow card) 10'; Orban (yellow card) 82'	Report	Papadopoulos 18', (yellow card) 55'; Walace 24'; Jung (yellow card) 86'; Hunt 90+3'	Stadium: Red Bull Arena; Attendance: 42,558; Referee: Sascha Stegemann

19 February 2017 21	Borussia Mönchengladbach	1–2	RB Leipzig	Mönchengladbach
15:30 CET (UTC+1)	Wendt (yellow card) 14'; Stindl (yellow card) 61'; Hazard (yellow card) 67'; Kramer (yellow card) 77'; Vestergaard 81'	Report	Forsberg 31'; Halstenberg (yellow card) 37'; Keïta (yellow card) 44'; Werner 55'; Demme (yellow card) 73'	Stadium: BORUSSIA-PARK; Attendance: 51,535; Referee: Felix Zwayer

25 February 2017 22	RB Leipzig	3–1	1. FC Köln	Leipzig
15:30 CET (UTC+1)	Forsberg 5'; Maroh 34' (o.g.); Ilsanker (yellow card) 62'; Werner 65'	Report	Maroh (yellow card) 7'; Rausch (yellow card) 39'; Osako 53'; Höger (yellow card) 68'; Hector (yellow card) 84'	Stadium: Red Bull Arena; Attendance: 39,335; Referee: Marco Fritz

3 March 2017 23	FC Augsburg	2–2	RB Leipzig	Augsburg
20:30 CET (UTC+1)	Stafylidis 19'; Morávek (yellow card) 33'; Ji (yellow card) 41'; Kohr (yellow card) 45+2'; Hinteregger 60'; Hitz (yellow card) 68'	Report	Werner 25'; Keïta (yellow card) 31'; Compper 52'; Ilsanker (yellow card) 84'	Stadium: WWK ARENA; Attendance: 28,314; Referee: Patrick Ittrich

11 March 2017 24	RB Leipzig	0–1	VfL Wolfsburg	Leipzig
15:30 CET (UTC+1)	Schmitz (yellow card) 14'; Orban (yellow card) 19'; Keïta (yellow card) 33'	Report	Gómez 9', (yellow card) 78'; Luiz Gustavo (yellow card) 21'; Gerhardt (yellow card) 73'; Seguin (yellow card) 89'	Stadium: Red Bull Arena; Attendance: 42,558; Referee: Benjamin Brand

18 March 2017 25	Werder Bremen	3–0	RB Leipzig	Bremen
15:30 CET (UTC+1)	Junuzović 34', (yellow card) 50'; Grillitsch 59'; Bauer (yellow card) 85'; Kainz 90'	Report	Orban (yellow card) 58'	Stadium: Weser-Stadion; Attendance: 41,384; Referee: Christian Dingert

1 April 2017 26	RB Leipzig	4–0	Darmstadt 98	Leipzig
15:30 CEST (UTC+2)	Keïta 12', 80'; Burke (yellow card) 42'; Forsberg 67'; Orban 79'	Report	Schipplock (yellow card) 57'; Sirigu (yellow card) 62' (yellow-red card) 72'; Kamavuaka (yellow card) 83'	Stadium: Red Bull Arena; Attendance: 39,394; Referee: Bastian Dankert

5 April 2017 27	Mainz 05	2–3	RB Leipzig	Mainz
20:00 CEST (UTC+2)	Jairo 69' (pen.), (yellow card) 74'; Brosinski (yellow card) 71'; Córdoba (yellow card) 75'; Frei (yellow card) 78'; Gbamin (red card) 89'; Muto 90+1'; de Blasis (yellow card) 90+3'; Donati (yellow card) 90+4'	Report	Upamecano (yellow card) 30'; Sabitzer 48', (yellow card) 71'; Werner 52'; Bernardo (yellow card) 56'; Keïta 81'; Ilsanker (yellow card) 90+3'	Stadium: OPEL ARENA; Attendance: 26,379; Referee: Tobias Stieler

8 April 2017 28	RB Leipzig	1–0	Bayer Leverkusen	Leipzig
15:30 CEST (UTC+2)	Orban (yellow card) 4' (yellow-red card) 88'; Poulsen 90+3'	Report	Wendell (yellow card) 58'	Stadium: Red Bull Arena; Attendance: 42,558; Referee: Robert Kampka

15 April 2017 29	RB Leipzig	4–0	SC Freiburg	Leipzig
15:30 CEST (UTC+2)	Keïta (yellow card) 27', (goal) 51'; Poulsen 36'; Werner 42'; Demme 90'	Report	Haberer (yellow card) 68'; Kübler (yellow card) 75'	Stadium: Red Bull Arena; Attendance: 41,446; Referee: Manuel Gräfe

23 April 2017 30	Schalke 04	1–1	RB Leipzig	Gelsenkirchen
17:30 CEST (UTC+2)	Stambouli (yellow card) 29'; Coke (yellow card) 43'; Huntelaar 46'; Meyer (yellow card) 78'	Report	Werner 14'; Halstenberg (yellow card) 40'; Keïta (yellow card) 73'	Stadium: VELTINS-Arena; Attendance: 60,916; Referee: Günter Perl

29 April 2017 31	RB Leipzig	0–0	FC Ingolstadt	Leipzig
15:30 CEST (UTC+2)	Upamecano (yellow card) 18'; Ilsanker (yellow card) 26'; Poulsen (yellow card) 59'	Report	Lezcano (yellow card) 28'; Roger (yellow card) 43'; Tisserand (yellow card) 48'; Morales (yellow card) 59' (yellow-red card) 86'; Lex (yellow card) 64'	Stadium: Red Bull Arena; Attendance: 41,053; Referee: Daniel Siebert

6 May 2017 32	Hertha BSC	1–4	RB Leipzig	Berlin
18:30 CEST (UTC+2)	Langkamp (yellow card) 52'; Ibišević (yellow card) 74'; Brooks (yellow card) 78'; Khedira 85' (o.g.)	Report	Werner 11', 54'; Compper (yellow card) 34'; Ilsanker (yellow card) 70'; Upamecano (yellow card) 84'; Selke 89', 90+2'	Stadium: Olympiastadion Berlin; Attendance: 62,301; Referee: Robert Hartmann

13 May 2017 33	RB Leipzig	4–5	Bayern Munich	Leipzig
15:30 CEST (UTC+2)	Sabitzer 2'; Werner 29' (pen.), 65'; Poulsen 47'; Keïta (yellow card) 90+6'	Report	Lewandowski 17' (pen.), 84'; Alonso (yellow card) 28'; Vidal (yellow card) 64'; Douglas Costa (yellow card) 64'; Thiago 60', (yellow card) 72'; Boateng (yellow card) 77'; Alaba 90+1'; Robben 90+5'	Stadium: Red Bull Arena; Attendance: 42,558; Referee: Tobias Stieler

20 May 2017 34	Eintracht Frankfurt	2–2	RB Leipzig	Frankfurt
15:30 CEST (UTC+2)	Fabián (yellow card) 37'; Vallejo 83'; Blum 90'	Report	Sabitzer 25'; Poulsen 56'; Kaiser (yellow card) 75'; Selke (yellow card) 89'	Stadium: Commerzbank-Arena; Attendance: 51,000; Referee: Felix Brych

=== DFB-Pokal ===
20 August 2016 First round	Dynamo Dresden	2–2 (a.e.t.) (5–4 p)	RB Leipzig	Dresden
15:30 CEST (UTC+2)	Kutschke 47' (pen.), 78'; Hartmann (yellow card) 66'; Aosman (yellow card) 120'	Report	Kaiser (yellow card) 13', (goal) 45+1' (pen.); Sabitzer 15'; Poulsen (yellow card) 78'	Stadium: DDV-Stadion; Attendance: 29,222; Referee: Felix Brych
	Penalties
	Testroet (penalty scored); Stefaniak (penalty scored); Teixeira (penalty scored); Gogia (penalty scored); Aosman (penalty scored)		(penalty scored) Kalmár; (penalty scored) Orban; (penalty scored) Ilsanker; (penalty missed) Kaiser; (penalty scored) Halstenberg

== Statistics ==
=== Appearances and goals ===
No.	Pos	Nat	Player	Total		Bundesliga		DFB-Pokal	
No.	Pos	Nat	Player	Apps	Goals	Apps	Goals	Apps	Goals
Goalkeepers
1	GK	(Switzerland) SUI	Fabio Coltorti	1	0	1	0	0	0
21	GK	(Germany) GER	Marius Müller	0	0	0	0	0	0
32	GK	(Hungary) HUN	Péter Gulácsi	34	0	33	0	1	0
Defenders
3	DF	(Brazil) BRA	Bernardo	22	0	21+1	0	0	0
4	DF	(Hungary) HUN	Willi Orbán	29	3	28	3	1	0
16	DF	(Germany) GER	Lukas Klostermann	1	0	1	0	0	0
17	DF	(France) FRA	Dayot Upamecano	12	0	8+4	0	0	0
20	DF	(Germany) GER	Benno Schmitz	17	0	11+5	0	1	0
23	DF	(Germany) GER	Marcel Halstenberg	31	0	30	0	1	0
33	DF	(Germany) GER	Marvin Compper	26	2	25	2	0+1	0
36	DF	(Germany) GER	Ken Gipson	0	0	0	0	0	0
Midfielders
6	MF	(Germany) GER	Rani Khedira	10	0	1+9	0	0	0
7	MF	(Austria) AUT	Marcel Sabitzer	33	9	31+1	8	1	1
8	MF	(Guinea) GUI	Naby Keïta	32	8	29+2	8	1	0
13	MF	(Austria) AUT	Stefan Ilsanker	34	0	29+4	0	1	0
19	MF	(Scotland) SCO	Oliver Burke	25	1	5+20	1	0	0
24	MF	(Germany) GER	Dominik Kaiser	26	2	7+18	1	1	1
31	MF	(Germany) GER	Diego Demme	33	1	32	1	1	0
Forwards
9	FW	(Denmark) DEN	Yussuf Poulsen	30	5	25+4	5	1	0
10	FW	(Sweden) SWE	Emil Forsberg	31	8	27+3	8	1	0
11	FW	(Germany) GER	Timo Werner	32	21	28+3	21	0+1	0
15	FW	(Germany) GER	Agyemang Diawusie	0	0	0	0	0	0
27	FW	(Germany) GER	Davie Selke	20	4	2+18	4	0	0
38	FW	(Germany) GER	Federico Palacios Martínez	2	0	0+2	0	0	0
Players transferred out during the season
17	MF	(Belgium) BEL	Massimo Bruno	1	0	0+1	0	0	0
5	DF	(Greece) GRE	Kyriakos Papadopoulos	1	0	0+1	0	0	0
18	FW	(United States) USA	Terrence Boyd	0	0	0	0	0	0
26	MF	(Germany) GER	Vitaly Janelt	0	0	0	0	0	0
35	MF	(Hungary) HUN	Zsolt Kalmár	1	0	0	0	0+1	0
40	MF	(Germany) GER	Idrissa Touré	0	0	0	0	0	0

Last updated: 20 May 2017
Source: Competitions

=== Goalscorers ===
Rank	No.	Pos	Nat	Name	Bundesliga	DFB-Pokal	Total
1	11	FW	(Germany)	Timo Werner	21	0	21
2	7	MF	(Austria)	Marcel Sabitzer	8	1	9
3	10	FW	(Sweden)	Emil Forsberg	8	0	8
3	8	MF	(Germany)	Naby Keïta	8	0	8
5	9	FW	(Denmark)	Yussuf Poulsen	5	0	5
6	27	FW	(Germany)	Davie Selke	4	0	4
7	4	DF	(Hungary)	Willi Orbán	3	0	3
8	24	MF	(Germany)	Dominik Kaiser	1	1	2
8	33	DF	(Germany)	Marvin Compper	2	0	2
10	19	MF	(Scotland)	Oliver Burke	1	0	1
10	31	MF	(Germany)	Diego Demme	1	0	1
Own goal					4	0	4
Totals					60	2	62

Last updated: 20 May 2017

=== Clean sheets ===
Rank	No.	Pos	Nat	Name	Bundesliga	DFB-Pokal	Total
1	32	GK	(Hungary)	Péter Gulácsi	9	0	9
2	1	GK	(Switzerland)	Fabio Coltorti	1	0	1
Totals					10	0	10

Last updated: 29 April 2017

=== Disciplinary record ===
No.	Pos	Nat	Player	Bundesliga			DFB-Pokal			Total		
No.	Pos	Nat	Player	Booked	(yellow card) (yellow-red card)	Sent off (straight red)	Booked	(yellow card) (yellow-red card)	Sent off (straight red)	Booked	(yellow card) (yellow-red card)	Sent off (straight red)
3	MF	(Brazil)	Bernardo	3	0	0	0	0	0	3	0	0
4	DF	(Hungary)	Willi Orbán	8	1	0	0	0	0	8	1	0
7	MF	(Austria)	Marcel Sabitzer	3	0	0	0	0	0	3	0	0
8	MF	(Guinea)	Naby Keïta	8	0	0	0	0	0	8	0	0
9	FW	(Denmark)	Yussuf Poulsen	4	0	0	1	0	0	5	0	0
10	FW	(Sweden)	Emil Forsberg	1	0	1	0	0	0	1	0	1
11	FW	(Germany)	Timo Werner	4	0	0	0	0	0	4	0	0
13	MF	(Austria)	Stefan Ilsanker	7	0	0	0	0	0	7	0	0
17	DF	(France)	Dayot Upamecano	3	0	0	0	0	0	3	0	0
19	MF	(Scotland)	Oliver Burke	1	0	0	0	0	0	1	0	0
20	DF	(Germany)	Benno Schmitz	2	0	0	0	0	0	2	0	0
23	DF	(Germany)	Marcel Halstenberg	4	0	0	0	0	0	4	0	0
24	MF	(Germany)	Dominik Kaiser	2	0	0	1	0	0	3	0	0
27	FW	(Germany)	Davie Selke	4	0	0	0	0	0	4	0	0
31	MF	(Germany)	Diego Demme	4	0	0	0	0	0	4	0	0
32	GK	(Hungary)	Péter Gulácsi	1	0	0	0	0	0	1	0	0
33	DF	(Germany)	Marvin Compper	6	0	0	0	0	0	6	0	0
Totals				65	1	1	2	0	0	67	1	1

Last updated: 20 May 2017
