= 2017–18 FC Ingolstadt 04 season =

FC Ingolstadt
2017–18 season
- Chairman: Peter Jackwerth
- Manager: Stefan Leitl
- Stadium: Audi Sportpark
- 2. Bundesliga: 9th
- DFB-Pokal: Round of 16
Home colours	Away colours	Third colours
- All statistics correct as of 28 January 2018.

The 2017–18 FC Ingolstadt 04 season is the 14th season in the football club's history. The season covers a period from 1 July 2017 to 30 June 2018.

== Players ==
=== Squad information ===
As of 26 January 2018

Note: Flags indicate national team as defined under FIFA eligibility rules; some limited exceptions apply. Players may hold more than one non-FIFA nationality.

No.	Pos.	Nation	Player
1	GK	NOR	Ørjan Nyland
2	DF	GER	Frederic Ananou
3	DF	GER	Tobias Levels
4	DF	BRA	Paulo Otávio
5	MF	GER	Max Christiansen
6	MF	USA	Alfredo Morales
7	FW	GER	Patrick Ebert
8	MF	ISR	Almog Cohen
9	FW	GER	Moritz Hartmann
10	MF	GER	Sonny Kittel
11	FW	PAR	Darío Lezcano
13	FW	GER	Robert Leipertz
14	FW	GER	Stefan Lex
16	GK	AUT	Marco Knaller

No.	Pos.	Nation	Player
17	MF	GER	Maximilian Thalhammer
19	MF	GER	Marcel Gaus
20	FW	GER	Stefan Kutschke
21	MF	GER	Tobias Schröck
22	MF	JPN	Takahiro Sekine
23	MF	JPN	Ryoma Watanabe
24	GK	CRO	Fabijan Buntić
25	DF	GER	Hauke Wahl
26	DF	GER	Phil Neumann
27	DF	GER	Lukas Gerlspeck
28	MF	GER	Christian Träsch
30	MF	GER	Thomas Pledl
34	DF	CMR	Marvin Matip (captain)

== Friendly matches ==
Win Draw Loss

1 July 2017	FC Ingolstadt 04	1–0	Karlsruher SC	Ingolstadt
16:00		Summary		Stadium: ASP-Trainingsplatz

2 July 2017	FC Ingolstadt 04	4–0	VfB Eichstätt	Ingolstadt
16:00		Summary		Stadium: Audi Sportpark

9 July 2017	FC Ingolstadt 04	2–1	Wehen Wiesbaden	Karlshuld
13:30		Summary		Stadium: Sporttenne Stelzer Stadion

12 July 2017	Sparta Prague	2–2	FC Ingolstadt 04
17:30		Summary

18 July 2017	FC Ingolstadt 04	0–0	Bursaspor
16:00		Summary

22 July 2017	FC Ingolstadt 04	2–0	Nantes	Ingolstadt
15:00		Summary		Stadium: Audi Sportpark

31 August 2017	Stuttgart	0–1	FC Ingolstadt 04	Stuttgart
14:30		Summary		Stadium: Robert-Schlienz-Stadion

6 October 2017	FC Ingolstadt 04	2–0	Unterhaching
13:00		Summary

== Competitions ==
Win Draw Loss

=== 2. Bundesliga ===
==== League table ====
Pos	Team	Pld	W	D	L	GF	GA	GD	Pts
7	MSV Duisburg	34	13	9	12	52	56	−4	48
8	Union Berlin	34	12	11	11	54	46	+8	47
9	FC Ingolstadt	34	12	9	13	47	45	+2	45
10	Darmstadt 98	34	10	13	11	47	45	+2	43
11	SV Sandhausen	34	11	10	13	35	33	+2	43

Source: DFB
Rules for classification: 1) Points; 2) Goal difference; 3) Goals scored

==== Results summary ====
Overall								Home						Away					
Pld	W	D	L	GF	GA	GD	Pts	W	D	L	GF	GA	GD	W	D	L	GF	GA	GD
19	8	5	6	27	20	+7	29	3	2	4	12	11	+1	5	3	2	15	9	+6

Last updated: 23 January 2018.

==== Results by round ====
Matchday	1	2	3	4	5	6	7	8	9	10	11	12	13	14	15	16	17	18	19	20	21	22	23	24	25	26	27	28	29	30	31	32	33	34
Ground	H	A	H	A	H	A	H	A	H	A	H	A	A	H	A	H	A	A	H	A	H	A	H	A	H	A	H	A	H	H	A	H	A	H
Result	L	L	L	W	L	W	D	L	W	D	W	W	W	W	D	L	D	W	D	L	W	D	L	L	L	D	W	W	D	D	L	L	W	L
Position	16	16	16	15	15	15	15	15	15	15	11	9	7	6	6	6	4	4	4	6	5	5	7	10	11	11	6	4	4	7	7	9	7	9

Updated to match(es) played on 23 January 2018. Source:
A = Away; H = Home; W = Win; D = Draw; L = Loss

==== Matches ====
29 July 2017 1	FC Ingolstadt 04	0–1	Union Berlin	Ingolstadt
13:00		Report	Polter (yellow card) 58'; Trimmel 59'; Pedersen (yellow card) 77'; Marc Torrejón (yellow card) 88'	Stadium: Audi Sportpark; Attendance: 10,870; Referee: Sascha Stegemann

4 August 2017 2	SV Sandhausen	1–0	FC Ingolstadt 04	Sandhausen
18:30	Vollmann (yellow card) 21'; Daghfous (yellow card) 62'; Wooten 70'	Report	Gaus (yellow card) 38'; Kutschke (yellow card) 43'	Stadium: BWT-Stadion am Hardtwald; Attendance: 5,321; Referee: Christof Günsch

20 August 2017 3	FC Ingolstadt 04	2–4	Jahn Regensburg	Ingolstadt
13:30	Kittel 52' (yellow card) 90+1'; Matip 57'; Schröck (yellow card) 64'; Paulo Otávio (yellow card) 86'	Report	Mees 27'; Grüttner (yellow card) 55'; George 73' 79'; Sørensen (yellow card) 75'; Nietfeld 90+3'	Stadium: Audi Sportpark; Attendance: 13,060; Referee: Marco Fritz

25 August 2017 4	Greuther Fürth	0–1	FC Ingolstadt 04	Fürth
18:30	Langer (yellow card) 49' (yellow-red card); Caligiuri (yellow card) 84'	Report	Kittel 55'; Lex (yellow card) 68'	Stadium: Sportpark Ronhof Thomas Sommer; Attendance: 8,655; Referee: Manuel Gräfe

9 September 2017 5	FC Ingolstadt 04	1–2	Erzgebirge Aue	Ingolstadt
13:00	Lezcano (yellow card) 55' (goal) 84'; Gaus (yellow card) 78'	Report	Köpke (yellow card) 15'; Bertram 50'; Rizzuto (yellow card) 55'; Fandrich (yellow card) 73'; Kempe (yellow card) 78'	Stadium: Audi Sportpark; Attendance: 10,176; Referee: Tobias Reichel

16 September 2017 6	FC St Pauli	0–4	FC Ingolstadt 04	Hamburg
13:00		Report	Kittel 6' 45+3' (yellow card) 70'; Wahl (yellow card) 10'; Matip (yellow card) 18'; Träsch 33'; Lezcano 40'; Gaus (yellow card) 43'; Christiansen (yellow card) 87'	Stadium: Millerntor-Stadion; Attendance: 29,380; Referee: Robert Schröder

19 September 2017 7	FC Ingolstadt 04	2–2	MSV Duisburg	Ingolstadt
18:30	Wahl 42' 52'; Lezcano (yellow card) 74'	Report	Tashchy 17' 54'; Fröde (yellow card) 45+1'	Stadium: Audi Sportpark; Attendance: 8,199; Referee: Frank Willenborg

24 September 2017 8	Bochum	2–0	FC Ingolstadt 04	Bochum
13:30	Bastians 24'; Kruse 27'; Stöger (yellow card) 30'; Danilo Soares (yellow card) 53'	Report	Cohen (yellow card) 33'; Lezcano (yellow card) 65'; Lex (yellow card) 76'; Träsch (yellow card) 80'	Stadium: Vonovia Ruhrstadion; Attendance: 11,251; Referee: Daniel Schlager

29 September 2017 9	FC Ingolstadt 04	3–0	Darmstadt 98	Ingolstadt
18:30	Kutschke 30' (pen.) (yellow card) 34'; Pledl (yellow card) 39' (goal) 79'; Kittel 60'	Report	Höhn (yellow card) 37'; Sirigu (yellow card) 44'; Marvin Mehlem (yellow card) 53'	Stadium: Audi Sportpark; Attendance: 8,746; Referee: Timo Gerach

14 October 2017 10	Dynamo Dresden	2–2	FC Ingolstadt 04	Dresden
13:00	Mlapa 30' (pen.) 49'; Hartmann (yellow card) 47'	Report	Christiansen (yellow card) 10'; Gaus 13'; Morales 23' (yellow card) 59'; Cohen (yellow card) 63'; Matip (yellow card) 83'	Stadium: DDV-Stadion; Attendance: 28,484; Referee: Sven Jablonski

20 October 2017 11	FC Ingolstadt 04	3–0	Heidenheim	Ingolstadt
18:30	Wahl 45'; Kittel 70'; Kutschke 79' (pen.)	Report	Titsch-Rivero (yellow card) 84'	Stadium: Audi Sportpark; Attendance: 9,242; Referee: Thorben Siewer

27 October 2017 12	Arminia Bielefeld	1–3	FC Ingolstadt 04	Bielefeld
18:30	Behrendt (red card) 26'; Börner 29' (yellow card) 90'; Prietl (yellow card) 68'; Ortega (yellow card) 86'	Report	Gaus (yellow card) 7' (yellow-red card); Pledl 11'; Kittel (yellow card) 14' (goal) 85'; Kutschke 45+1' (pen.); Matip (yellow card) 84'	Stadium: SchücoArena; Attendance: 15,005; Referee: Timo Gerach

6 November 2017 13	Nürnberg	1–2	FC Ingolstadt 04	Nuremberg
20:30	Möhwald 36'	Report	Kutschke 14'; Lezcano 81' (pen.)	Stadium: Max-Morlock-Stadion; Attendance: 24,191; Referee: Felix Zwayer

19 November 2017 14	FC Ingolstadt 04	1–0	Fortuna Düsseldorf	Ingolstadt
13:30	Morales (yellow card) 3' (goal) 45'; Gaus (yellow card) 53'; Cohen (yellow card) 71'; Träsch (yellow card) 84'; Kittel (yellow card) 87'	Report	Hoffmann (yellow card) 55'; Hennings (yellow card) 86'; Sobottka (yellow card) 87'	Stadium: Audi Sportpark; Attendance: 11,648; Referee: Daniel Schlager

25 November 2017 15	Holstein Kiel	0–0	FC Ingolstadt 04	Kiel
13:00	Kinsombi (yellow card) 28'	Report	Lezcano (yellow card) 66'; Cohen (yellow card) 73'	Stadium: Holstein-Stadion; Attendance: 9,701; Referee: Harm Osmers

4 December 2017 16	FC Ingolstadt 04	0–2	Eintracht Braunschweig	Ingolstadt
20:30	Cohen (yellow card) 54'; Träsch (yellow card) 83'	Report	Breitkreuz (yellow card) 10'; Reichel (yellow card) 26'; Zuck (yellow card) 32' (goal) 76'; Fejzić (yellow card) 52'; Abdullahi 65'	Stadium: Audi Sportpark; Attendance: 8,714; Referee: Robert Kampka

10 December 2017 17	Kaiserslautern	1–1	FC Ingolstadt 04	Kaiserslautern
13:30	Andersson 7'; Kessel (yellow card) 11' (yellow-red card); Borrello (yellow card) 23'; Müller (yellow card) 68'	Report	Levels (yellow card) 73'; Träsch (yellow card) 78'; Lezcano 79'	Stadium: Fritz-Walter-Stadion; Attendance: 16,074; Referee: Matthias Jöllenbeck

15 December 2017 18	Union Berlin	1–2	FC Ingolstadt 04	Berlin
18:30	Skrzybski 59' (pen.); Kroos (yellow card) 60'; Fürstner (yellow card) 63'	Report	Leipertz 73' (yellow card) 74'; Lezcano 77' (pen.); Levels (yellow card) 90+2'	Stadium: Stadion An der Alten Försterei; Attendance: 20,170; Referee: Martin Petersen

23 January 2018 19	FC Ingolstadt 04	0–0	Sandhausen	Ingolstadt
20:30	Kutschke (yellow card) 87'	Report	Förster (yellow card) 62'; Zejnullahu (yellow card) 75'	Stadium: Audi Sportpark; Attendance: 7,575; Referee: Marco Fritz

26 February 2018 20	Jahn Regensburg	3–2	FC Ingolstadt 04	Regensburg
18:30	Wahl 72' (o.g.); Stolze 78'; Nietfeld 88'	Report	Morales 3'; Lezcano 37' (pen.)	Stadium: Continental Arena; Attendance: 13,010; Referee: Timo Gerach

3 February 2018 21	FC Ingolstadt 04	3–0	Greuther Fürth	Ingolstadt
13:00	Kittel 33'; Morales 70'; Pledl 88'	Report		Stadium: Audi Sportpark; Attendance: 9,658; Referee: Sven Jablonski

11 February 2018 22	Erzgebirge Aue	0–0	FC Ingolstadt 04	Aue
13:30		Report		Stadium: Sparkassen-Erzgebirgsstadion; Attendance: 6,850; Referee: Robert Schröder

17 February 2018 23	FC Ingolstadt 04	0–1	FC St. Pauli	Ingolstadt
13:00		Report	Allagui 30'	Stadium: Audi Sportpark; Attendance: 10,071; Referee: Sven Waschitzki

24 February 2018 24	MSV Duisburg	2–1	FC Ingolstadt 04	Duisburg
13:00	Engin 13'; Tashchy 66' (pen.)	Report	Kutschke 18'	Stadium: MSV-Arena; Attendance: 12,446; Referee: Johann Pfeifer

5 March 2018 25	FC Ingolstadt 04	0–1	VfL Bochum	Ingolstadt
20:30		Report	Tesche 32'	Stadium: Audi Sportpark; Attendance: 7,934; Referee: Tobias Stieler

10 March 2018 26	Darmstadt 98	1–1	FC Ingolstadt 04	Darmstadt
13:00	Kempe 67'	Report	Leipertz 18'	Stadium: Merck-Stadion am Böllenfalltor; Attendance: 14,000; Referee: Thorben Siewer

18 March 2018 27	FC Ingolstadt 04	4–2	Dynamo Dresden	Ingolstadt
13:30	Pledl 16'; Schröck 28'; Kittel 90+1'; Cohen 90+4'	Report	Koné 59' (pen.); Ballas 79'	Stadium: Audi Sportpark; Attendance: 11,388; Referee: Manuel Gräfe

31 March 2018 28	Heidenheim	1–2	FC Ingolstadt 04	Heidenheim an der Brenz
13:00	Thiel 80'	Report	Cohen 62'; Leipertz 67'	Stadium: Voith-Arena; Attendance: 11,300; Referee: Dr. Martin Thomsen

8 April 2018 29	FC Ingolstadt 04	2–2	Arminia Bielefeld	Ingolstadt
13:30	Kutschke 59'; Leipertz 62'	Report	Klos 60'; Voglsammer 77'	Stadium: Audi Sportpark; Attendance: 10,213; Referee: Patrick Alt

15 April 2018 30	FC Ingolstadt 04	1–1	1. FC Nürnberg	Ingolstadt
13:30	Leipertz 50'	Report	Zreľák 74'	Stadium: Audi-Sportpark; Attendance: 15,200; Referee: Frank Willenborg

22 April 2018 31	Fortuna Düsseldorf	3–0	FC Ingolstadt 04	Düsseldorf
13:30	Hennings 7'; Gießelmann 39'; Bormuth 65'	Report		Stadium: Esprit Arena; Attendance: 33,925; Referee: Manuel Gräfe

29 April 2018 32	FC Ingolstadt 04	1–5	Holstein Kiel	Ingolstadt
13:30	Kittel 43'	Report	Kinsombi 25'; Ducksch 60'; Levels 68' (o.g.); Schindler 72'; Drexler 74'	Stadium: Audi Sportpark; Attendance: 9,649; Referee: Bibiana Steinhaus

6 May 2018 33	Eintracht Braunschweig	0–2	FC Ingolstadt 04	Braunschweig
15:30		Report	Leipertz 56'; Kutschke 67'	Stadium: Eintracht-Stadion; Attendance: 21,400; Referee: Martin Petersen

13 May 2018 34	FC Ingolstadt 04	1–3	Kaiserslautern	Ingolstadt
15:30	Gaus 49'	Report	Mwene 40', 42'; Andersson 47'	Stadium: Audi Sportpark; Attendance: 11,721; Referee: Sven Waschitzki

=== DFB-Pokal ===
13 August 2017 First round	1860 Munich	1–2	FC Ingolstadt 04	Munich
	Weber (yellow card) 17' (goal) 66'; Andermatt (yellow card) 32'; Killian Jakob (yellow card) 57'; Wein (yellow card) 57'; Mauersberger (yellow card) 72' (yellow-red card); Berzel (yellow card) 82'	Report	Lezcano 20' (yellow card) 80'; Kittel (yellow card) 40'; Wahl (yellow card) 60'; Lex (yellow card) 65'; Kutschke 83' (pen.)	Stadium: Grünwalder Stadion; Attendance: 12,500; Referee: Tobias Stieler

24 October 2017 Second round	Greuther Fürth	1–3	FC Ingolstadt 04	Fürth
20:45	Raum 46'; Ayçiçek (yellow card) 72'	Report	Sekine (yellow card) 27'; Cohen 48' (pen.) (yellow card) 51'; Morales (yellow card) 71' (goal) 87'; Gaus (yellow card) 73'; Lex 83'	Stadium: Sportpark Ronhof Thomas Sommer; Attendance: 4,925; Referee: Harm Osmers

19 December 2017 Round of 16	SC Paderborn	1–0	FC Ingolstadt 04	Paderborn
18:30	Zolinski 56'; Boeder (yellow card) 66'; Krauße (yellow card) 90+2'	Report	Pledl (yellow card) 22'; Gaus (yellow card) 39'; Cohen (yellow card) 41'; Kittel (yellow card) 67'	Stadium: Benteler-Arena; Attendance: 14,800; Referee: Felix Zwayer
