= Fabijan Buntić =

Footballer (born 1997)

Personal information
- Date of birth: 24 February 1997 (age 29)
- Place of birth: Stuttgart, Germany
- Height: 1.94 m (6 ft 4 in)
- Position: Goalkeeper

Team information
- Current team: Farense
- Number: 97

Youth career
- SV Vaihingen
- –2012: Stuttgarter Kickers
- 2012–2016: VfB Stuttgart

Senior career*
Years	Team	Apps	(Gls)
2016–2019	FC Ingolstadt II	74	(0)
2016–2022	FC Ingolstadt	95	(1)
2022–2024	Vizela	61	(0)
2024–2026	Qarabağ	11	(0)
2026–	Farense	5	(0)

International career
2014–2015	Croatia U18	7	(0)
2014–2016	Croatia U19	6	(0)
- * Club domestic league appearances and goals as of 13 September 2026

Fabijan Buntić (born 24 February 1997) is a professional footballer who plays as a goalkeeper for Liga Portugal 2 club Farense. Born in Germany, he has represented Croatia at youth level.

== Club career ==
Buntić is a graduate of the VfB Stuttgart club's youth system. However, he has not played any official matches for the Stuttgart first team.

Buntić made his professional debut for FC Ingolstadt in the 2. Bundesliga on 1 December 2018, starting in the match against Hamburger SV, which finished as a 2–1 home loss. On 6 February 2021, he scored a goal after coming up the field in the dying minutes of a 2–1 victory over Viktoria Köln.

On 3 July 2022, he was transferred to the Portuguese club Vizela. On 6 August 2022, Buntić played his first game for Vizela in a match against Rio Ave.

On 10 June 2024, Buntić moved to Qarabağ in Azerbaijan Premier League on a three-year contract.

== International career ==
Although he was born in Germany, Buntić chose to represent Croatia due to his Croatian heritage. In 2014, he was invited to the Croatia under-18s. He played for Croatia's youth national teams for two years, appearing in seven matches for the U18 team and six matches for the U19 team.

== Career statistics ==
As of match played 22 April 2026

Appearances and goals by club, season and competition
Club	Season	League			National Cup		League Cup		Europe		Other		Total	
Club	Season	Division	Apps	Goals	Apps	Goals	Apps	Goals	Apps	Goals	Apps	Goals	Apps	Goals
FC Ingolstadt II	2016–17	Regionalliga Bayern	25	0	—		—		—		—		25	0
FC Ingolstadt II	2017–18	Regionalliga Bayern	27	0	—		—		—		—		27	0
FC Ingolstadt II	2018–19	Regionalliga Bayern	22	0	—		—		—		—		22	0
FC Ingolstadt II	Total		74	0	—		—		—		—		74	0
FC Ingolstadt	2016–17	Bundesliga	0	0	0	0	—		—		—		0	0
FC Ingolstadt	2017–18	2. Bundesliga	0	0	0	0	—		—		—		0	0
FC Ingolstadt	2018–19	2. Bundesliga	4	0	0	0	—		—		—		4	0
FC Ingolstadt	2019–20	3. Liga	35	0	1	0	—		—		0	0	36	0
FC Ingolstadt	2020–21	3. Liga	38	1	1	0	—		—		2	0	41	1
FC Ingolstadt	2021–22	2. Bundesliga	18	0	2	0	—		—		—		20	0
FC Ingolstadt	Total		95	1	4	0	—		—		2	0	101	1
Vizela	2022–23	Primeira Liga	33	0	0	0	2	0	—		—		35	0
Vizela	2023–24	Primeira Liga	28	0	2	0	2	0	—		—		32	0
Vizela	Total		61	0	2	0	4	0	—		—		67	0
Hannover 96	2024–25	Azerbaijan Premier League	7	0	1	0	—		7	0	—		15	0
Hannover 96	2025–26	Azerbaijan Premier League	4	0	2	0	—		1	0	—		7	0
Hannover 96	Total		11	0	3	0	—		8	0	—		22	0
Career total			241	1	9	0	4	0	8	0	2	0	264	1
