= Anthony Jung =

German footballer (born 1991)

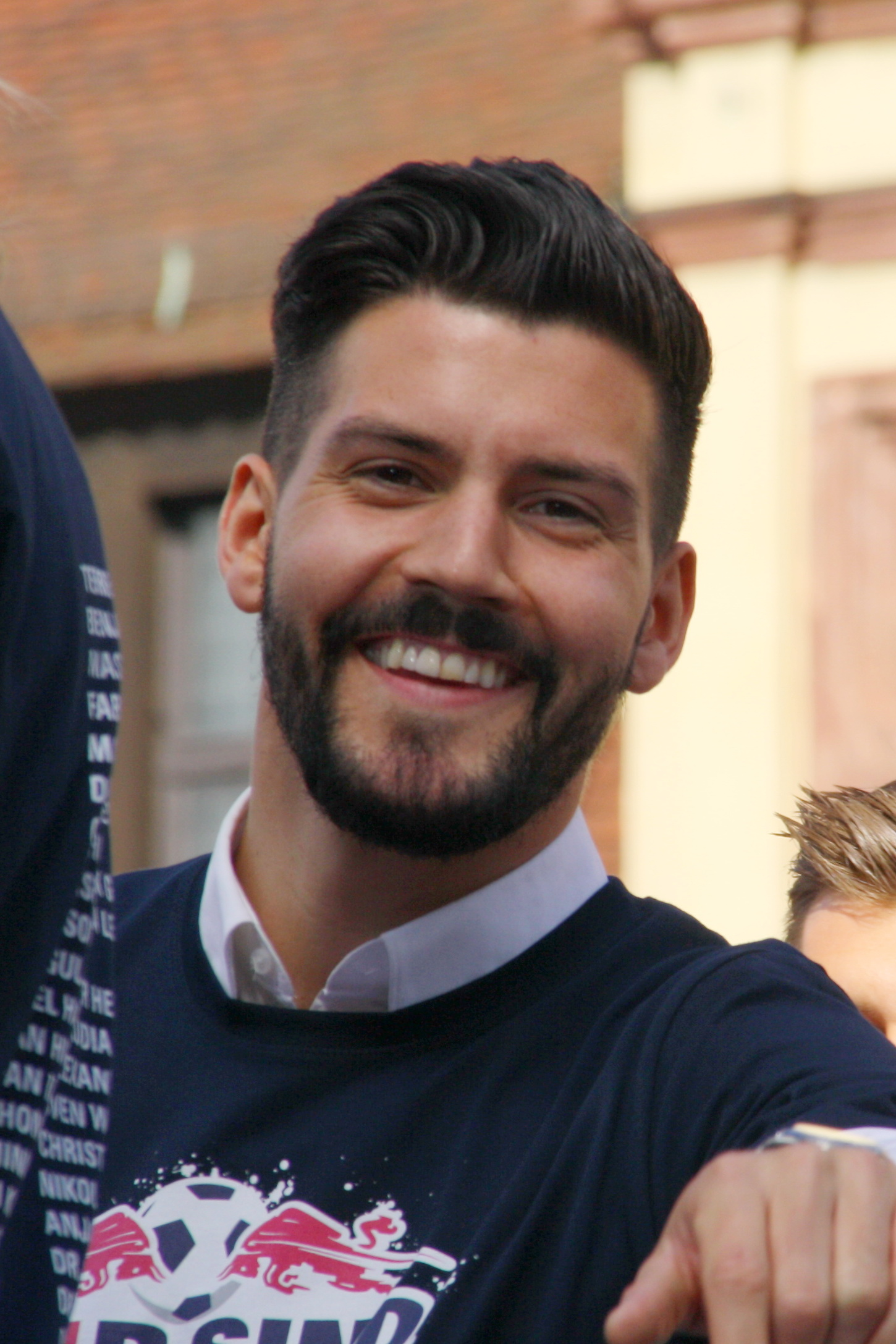
- Jung celebrating promotion with RB Leipzig in 2016

Personal information
- Date of birth: 3 November 1991 (age 35)
- Place of birth: Villajoyosa, Spain
- Height: 1.86 m (6 ft 1 in)
- Positions: Left-back; centre-back

Team information
- Current team: SC Freiburg
- Number: 5

Youth career
- 1. FC Nord Wiesbaden
- Germania Wiesbaden
- FV Biebrich 02
- Wehen Wiesbaden
- 2005–2010: Eintracht Frankfurt

Senior career*
Years	Team	Apps	(Gls)
2010–2012	Eintracht Frankfurt II	53	(1)
2012–2013	FSV Frankfurt II	11	(1)
2012–2013	FSV Frankfurt	10	(0)
2013–2018	RB Leipzig	78	(3)
2015–2016	RB Leipzig II	2	(1)
2016–2017	→ FC Ingolstadt (loan)	16	(1)
2017–2018	→ Brøndby (loan)	29	(1)
2018–2021	Brøndby	94	(3)
2021–2025	Werder Bremen	123	(5)
2025–	SC Freiburg	12	(0)

International career
2011–2012	Germany U20	2	(0)
- * Club domestic league appearances and goals as of 10 May 2026 (UTC)

Anthony Jung (German pronunciation: [anˈtonɪ ˈjʊŋ]; born 3 November 1991) is a German professional footballer who plays as a left-back or centre-back for Bundesliga club SC Freiburg.

== Club career ==
=== Early career ===
Jung played youth football for multiple clubs in the Wiesbaden area before joining the Eintracht Frankfurt youth academy in 2005. In 2010 he was included in the club's second team, where he became a regular in the German fourth tier. In January 2012, first team head coach, Armin Veh included Jung in the first team training camp in Qatar. After the 2011–12 season, he joined FSV Frankfurt on a free transfer, signing a one-year deal with the option of extending the deal with another year. In the first match of the 2012–13 season, a 1–1 draw against SV Sandhausen, Jung made his professional debut.

=== RB Leipzig ===
Jung joined RB Leipzig in June 2013, who had just been promoted to the 2. Bundesliga. He signed a three-year deal with the club. In 2015, he extended his contract to 2019.

==== Loan to Ingolstadt ====
In August 2016, Jung was loaned to Bundesliga club FC Ingolstadt for the 2016–17 season. There, he made his debut in the Bundesliga in a 2–1 home loss against TSG 1899 Hoffenheim. On 10 December 2016, Jung gave an assist to Roger from a free kick to inflict RB Leipzig's first defeat in the 2016–17 Bundesliga, ending their run of 13 unbeaten league games.

As Ingolstadt were relegated to the 2. Bundesliga after the season, he returned to RB Leipzig.

=== Brøndby ===
In July 2017, Jung joined Danish Superliga club Brøndby IF on a one-year loan deal reuniting with former RB Leipzig coach Alexander Zorniger. On 23 July 2017, he made his Superliga debut in 3–2 away loss to Nordsjælland. Jung scored his first goal for the club on 19 April 2018, the match-winner, in a 3–2 away win over Midtjylland, giving his club a three-point advantage in the title mount. During the 2017–18 season, Jung made 29 league appearances in which he scored one goal, as Brøndby finished second in the league behind Midtjylland. On 10 May 2018, he made an appearance as Brøndby defeated Silkeborg 3–1 in the Danish Cup final; the club's first silverware in 10 years.

In June 2018, RB Leipzig and Brøndby reached an agreement for a permanent transfer of Jung. He signed a three-year deal with the Danish club. He soon evolved into a starter for the club, first as a left-back, and later under head coach Niels Frederiksen, as a centre-back in his 3–5–2 formation. Jung scored his second goal for the club on 16 February 2020 in a 2–0 away win over OB, a tap-in early in the match. His third goal came a week later, on 23 February, in a 3–2 away loss to AaB as he volleyed in the 2–2 equaliser from the edge of the box. He scored again on 7 June, after the season had been resumed as part of the COVID-19 pandemic, the first goal in a 3–2 away loss to AC Horsens. However, he was also sent off during the match as he received two yellow cards. Jung finished the 2019–20 season with 40 appearances across all competitions, including qualifiers for the UEFA Europa League, scoring three goals – all in the Superliga.

During the 2020–21 season, Jung developed into a key player for Brøndby as the team topped the league table during the first half of the season. With his contract expiring in June 2021, fans began a petition in February 2021 for him to sign a contract extension.

=== Werder Bremen ===
In June 2021, Werder Bremen, newly relegated to the 2. Bundesliga, announced the signing of Jung from Brøndby for the 2021–22 season. He made his debut for the club in a 1–1 draw against Hannover 96. He reached promotion back to the Bundesliga with Werder in his first season at the club, making 30 appearances in which he scored two goals.

=== SC Freiburg ===
On 23 May 2025, Jung signed a contract with SC Freiburg from the upcoming season on a free transfer from Werder Bremen, replacing the retired Manuel Gulde. Freiburg highlighted Jung's experience, left-footed strength in duels, and tactical flexibility as key reasons behind the signing

== Personal life ==
Jung was born in Villajoyosa, Spain, to a German mother and Spanish father. He emigrated at the age of three with his divorced mother to Germany.

== Career statistics ==
=== Club ===
As of match played 10 May 2026

Appearances and goals by club, season and competition
Club	Season	League			Cup		Europe		Other		Total	
Club	Season	Division	Apps	Goals	Apps	Goals	Apps	Goals	Apps	Goals	Apps	Goals
Eintracht Frankfurt II	2010–11	Regionalliga Süd	28	0	0	0	—		—		28	0
Eintracht Frankfurt II	2011–12	Regionalliga Süd	25	1	0	0	—		—		25	1
Eintracht Frankfurt II	Total		53	1	0	0	—		—		53	1
FSV Frankfurt	2012–13	2. Bundesliga	10	0	0	0	—		—		10	0
FSV Frankfurt II	2012–13	Regionalliga Südwest	11	1	0	0	—		—		11	1
RB Leipzig	2013–14	3. Liga	24	3	1	0	—		—		25	3
RB Leipzig	2014–15	2. Bundesliga	32	0	3	1	—		—		35	1
RB Leipzig	2015–16	2. Bundesliga	22	0	2	0	—		—		24	0
RB Leipzig	Total		78	3	6	1	—		—		84	4
RB Leipzig II	2015–16	Regionalliga Nordost	2	1	0	0	—		—		2	1
FC Ingolstadt (loan)	2016–17	Bundesliga	16	1	1	0	—		—		17	1
Brøndby (loan)	2017–18	Superliga	29	1	4	0	—		—		33	1
Brøndby	2018–19	Superliga	31	0	3	0	4 (Note: Appearance(s) in the UEFA Europa League)	0	1 (Note: Appearance in Danish Superliga Europa League play-off)	0	39	0
Brøndby	2019–20	Superliga	32	3	2	0	6	0	0	0	40	3
Brøndby	2020–21	Superliga	31	0	1	0	—		0	0	32	0
Brøndby	Total		94	3	6	0	10	0	1	0	111	3
Werder Bremen	2021–22	2. Bundesliga	30	2	0	0	—		—		30	2
Werder Bremen	2022–23	Bundesliga	34	2	2	0	—		—		36	2
Werder Bremen	2023–24	Bundesliga	31	1	1	0	—		—		32	1
Werder Bremen	2024–25	Bundesliga	28	0	4	1	—		—		32	1
Werder Bremen	Total		123	5	7	1	0	0	0	0	130	6
Freiburg	2025–26	Bundesliga	12	0	0	0	3	0	—		15	0
Career total			428	16	24	2	13	0	1	0	466	18

== Honours ==
Brøndby

- Danish Superliga: 2020–21
- Danish Cup: 2017–18

SC Freiburg

- UEFA Europa League runner-up: 2025–26
