= Kerem Bülbül =

German footballer

Personal information
- Date of birth: 12 January 1995 (age 31)
- Place of birth: Berlin, Germany
- Height: 1.89 m (6 ft 2 in)
- Position: Attacking midfielder

Youth career
- Lichterfelder FC
- BFC Preussen
- Tennis Borussia Berlin
- Tasmania Gropiusstadt
- –2011: Hertha Zehlendorf
- 2011–2014: VfL Wolfsburg

Senior career*
Years	Team	Apps	(Gls)
2014	Sivasspor	0	(0)
2015–2016	Hertha BSC II	14	(0)
2016–2017	FC Ingolstadt	0	(0)
2016–2017	→ Hansa Rostock (loan)	17	(2)
2017–2018	Mainz 05 II	17	(1)
2018–2019	Berliner AK 07	0	(0)
2019–2020	Tennis Borussia Berlin	10	(2)

International career
2013	German U19	2	(0)
- * Club domestic league appearances and goals as of 13:37, 9 April 2022 (UTC)

Kerem Bülbül (born 12 January 1995) is a German professional footballer who plays as an attacking midfielder.
