= Alfredo Morales =

Professional soccer player (born 1990)

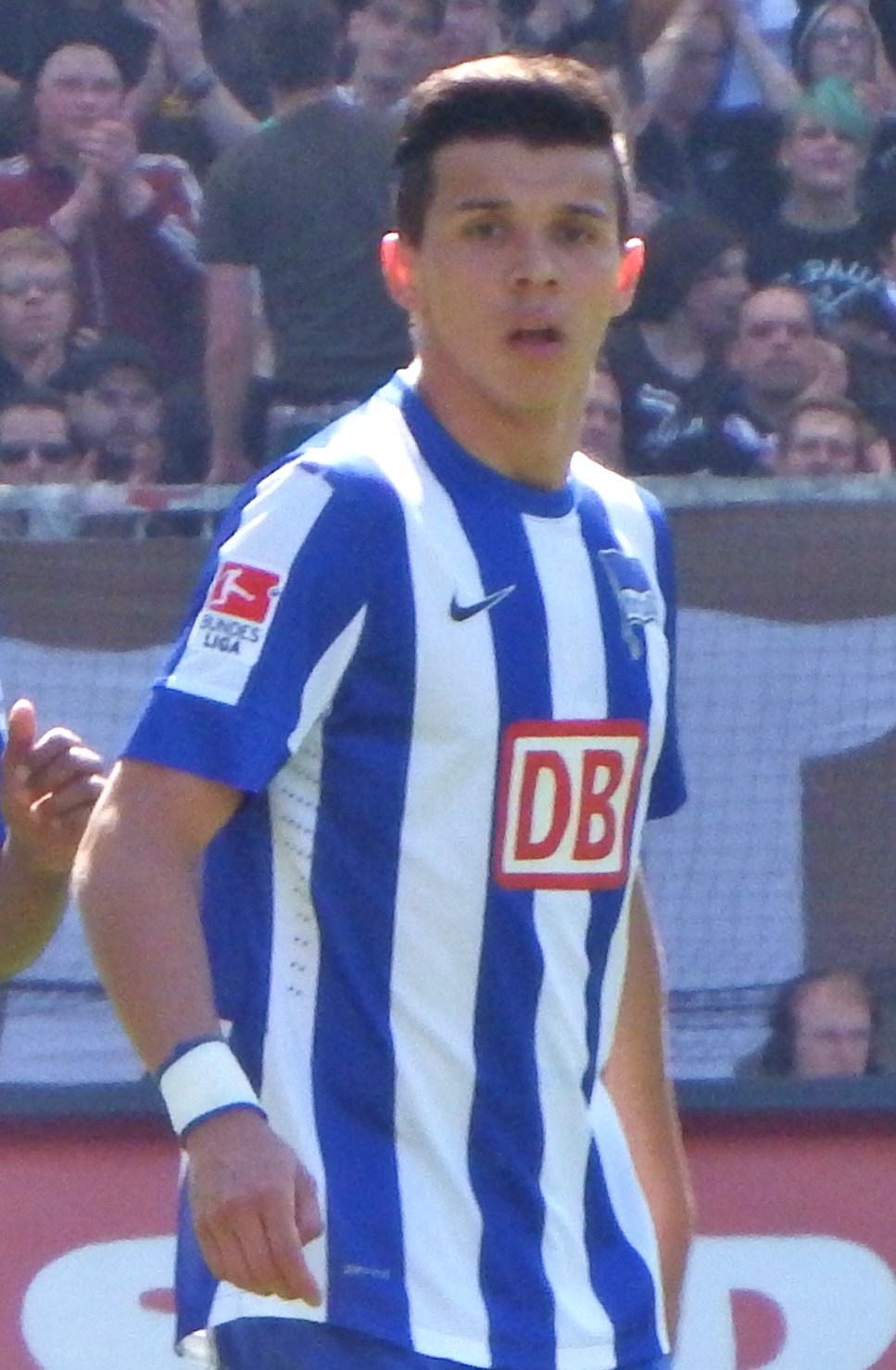
- Morales with Hertha BSC in 2013

Personal information
- Full name: Alfredo Morales
- Date of birth: May 12, 1990 (age 36)
- Place of birth: Berlin, Germany
- Height: 6 ft 0 in (1.83 m)
- Position: Midfielder

Team information
- Current team: St. Louis City SC
- Number: 27

Youth career
- 1994–1997: BSC Reinickendorf 21
- 1997–1999: Borussia Pankow
- 1999–2000: FC Concordia Wilhelmsruh
- 2000–2008: Hertha BSC

Senior career*
Years	Team	Apps	(Gls)
2008–2013	Hertha BSC II	82	(11)
2010–2013	Hertha BSC	20	(1)
2013–2018	FC Ingolstadt	142	(9)
2018–2021	Fortuna Düsseldorf	61	(2)
2021–2023	New York City FC	73	(0)
2024	San Jose Earthquakes	23	(0)
2025	St. Louis City SC	25	(0)

International career^{‡}
2008–2009	United States U20	4	(0)
2012	United States U23	1	(0)
2013–2019	United States	16	(0)
- * Club domestic league appearances and goals as of October 22, 2025 ‡ National team caps and goals as of November 19, 2019

Alfredo Morales (born May 12, 1990) is a former professional soccer player who played as a midfielder for Major League Soccer club St. Louis City SC. Born in Germany, he played for the United States national team.

== Club career ==
Morales took his first steps at Borussia Pankow in the east of Berlin. In November 2008, Morales played his first match for Hertha BSC II in the Regionalliga. In 2010, he was allowed to travel with the professional players to the summer training camp for first time, though he could not make it to the squad. Due to injuries to Fanol Perdedaj and Raffael, however, he made his professional debut for Hertha's first team on December 5, 2010, in a match against 1860 Munich, which Hertha lost 0–1.

On May 17, 2013, Morales joined FC Ingolstadt on a two-year contract. Morales received a red card in the 80th minute of Ingolstadt's opening match against Erzgebirge Aue on July 19, 2013, after earning a spot in the starting XI. On May 16, 2018, Morales joined newly promoted Bundesliga team Fortuna Düsseldorf.

On April 7, 2021, Morales joined Major League Soccer club New York City FC on a three-year contract through the 2023 season with an option for 2024.

In February 2025, Morales signed with Major League Soccer club, St. Louis City SC, through the 2025 season with a club option for 2026.

In October 2025, St. Louis City SC announced that the club had declined Morales's contract option for 2026.

On May 19, 2026, Morales announced his retirement from professional and international soccer.

== International career ==
Morales was eligible to play for the United States through his father, who was born in Peru but is an American citizen and served in the U.S. military. Morales was called up by the senior U.S. squad for the November 2011 European friendlies. Morales made his first appearance for the national on January 29, 2013, in an international friendly against Canada, coming on as a substitute in the 75th minute.

Morales had considered playing for Peru since his father is from Chimbote, Peru. Sergio Markarián, then coach of the Peru national team, had shown interest in the German-born player. Morales was cap-tied to the United States on July 13, 2015, when he started against Panama in the 2015 CONCACAF Gold Cup. The day after, however, he was replaced by Joe Corona on the roster, as each squad that advanced to the knockout stage could make six changes to their roster.

== Career statistics ==
As of games played on February 21, 2021

Appearances and goals by club, season and competition
Club	Season	League			National cup		Total	
Club	Season	Division	Apps	Goals	Apps	Goals	Apps	Goals
Hertha BSC II	2008–09	Regionalliga Nord	4	0	—		4	0
Hertha BSC II	2009–10	Regionalliga Nord	26	4	—		26	4
Hertha BSC II	2010–11	Regionalliga Nord	26	3	—		26	3
Hertha BSC II	2011–12	Regionalliga Nord	16	1	—		16	1
Hertha BSC II	2012–13	Regionalliga Nordost	10	3	—		10	3
Hertha BSC II	Total		82	11	—		82	11
Hertha BSC	2010–11	2. Bundesliga	3	0	0	0	3	0
Hertha BSC	2011–12	Bundesliga	8	0	2	0	10	0
Hertha BSC	2012–13	2. Bundesliga	9	1	1	0	10	1
Hertha BSC	Total		20	1	3	0	23	1
FC Ingolstadt	2013–14	2. Bundesliga	32	1	2	0	34	1
FC Ingolstadt	2014–15	2. Bundesliga	32	2	1	0	33	2
FC Ingolstadt	2015–16	Bundesliga	24	1	1	0	25	1
FC Ingolstadt	2016–17	Bundesliga	27	1	1	0	28	1
FC Ingolstadt	2017–18	2. Bundesliga	27	4	2	1	29	5
FC Ingolstadt	Total		142	9	7	1	149	10
Fortuna Düsseldorf	2018–19	Bundesliga	23	1	3	0	26	1
Fortuna Düsseldorf	2019–20	Bundesliga	24	1	4	0	28	2
Fortuna Düsseldorf	2020–21	2. Bundesliga	14	0	2	0	16	0
Fortuna Düsseldorf	Total		61	2	9	0	70	3
Career total			305	23	19	1	324	24

== Honors ==
New York City FC

- MLS Cup: 2021
