= Florent Hadergjonaj =

Footballer (born 1994)

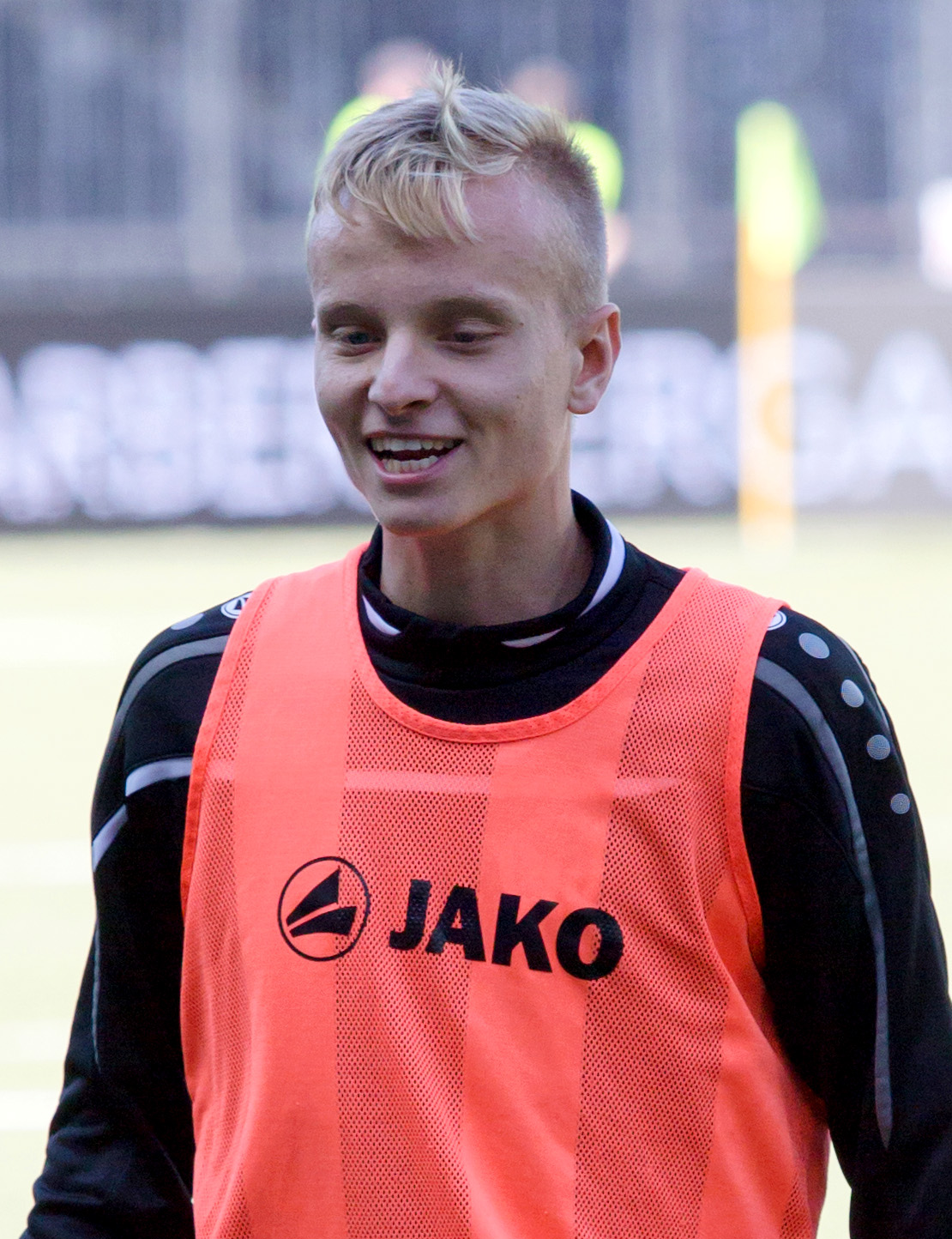
- Hadergjonaj with Young Boys in 2014

Personal information
- Full name: Florent Hadergjonaj
- Date of birth: 31 July 1994 (age 32)
- Place of birth: Langnau, Switzerland
- Height: 1.82 m (6 ft 0 in)
- Position: Right-back

Team information
- Current team: Alanyaspor
- Number: 94

Youth career
- 2003–2006: Langnau
- 2006–2010: Thun
- 2010–2011: Luzern
- 2011–2013: Young Boys

Senior career*
Years	Team	Apps	(Gls)
2013–2016	Young Boys	71	(1)
2016–2018	Ingolstadt 04	27	(1)
2017–2018	→ Huddersfield Town (loan)	23	(0)
2018–2020	Huddersfield Town	45	(0)
2020	→ Kasımpaşa (loan)	13	(0)
2020–2023	Kasımpaşa	105	(7)
2023–	Alanyaspor	93	(12)

International career
2013–2015	Switzerland U20	3	(0)
2014–2016	Switzerland U21	10	(0)
2017	Switzerland	1	(0)
2019–2026	Kosovo	39	(1)
- * Club domestic league appearances and goals as of 10 June 2026

Florent Hadergjonaj (Albanian pronunciation: [hadeɾɟoˈnaj]; born 31 July 1994) is a professional footballer who plays as a right-back for Süper Lig club Alanyaspor. Born in Switzerland, he previously represented his birthplace at youth and senior levels before switching to play for the Kosovo national team.

== Club career ==
=== Early career and Young Boys ===
Hadergjonaj is a product of various Swiss youth teams such as Langnau, Thun and Luzern. In 2011, he joined youth team of Young Boys. Hadergjonaj is a youth exponent from Young Boys, he made his first Swiss Super League appearance on 29 September 2013 after being named in the starting line-up in a 1–0 home defeat against Zürich. Hadergjonaj made 11 league appearances during the 2013–14 season and he won the Young Boys' player of the year award after one year and a half from his debut.

=== Ingolstadt 04 ===
On 8 August 2016, Hadergjonaj joined Bundesliga side Ingolstadt 04, on a four-year contract. On 22 October 2016, he made his debut against Borussia Dortmund after being named in the starting line-up, and assist in the third goal during a 3–3 draw.

==== Loan at Huddersfield Town ====
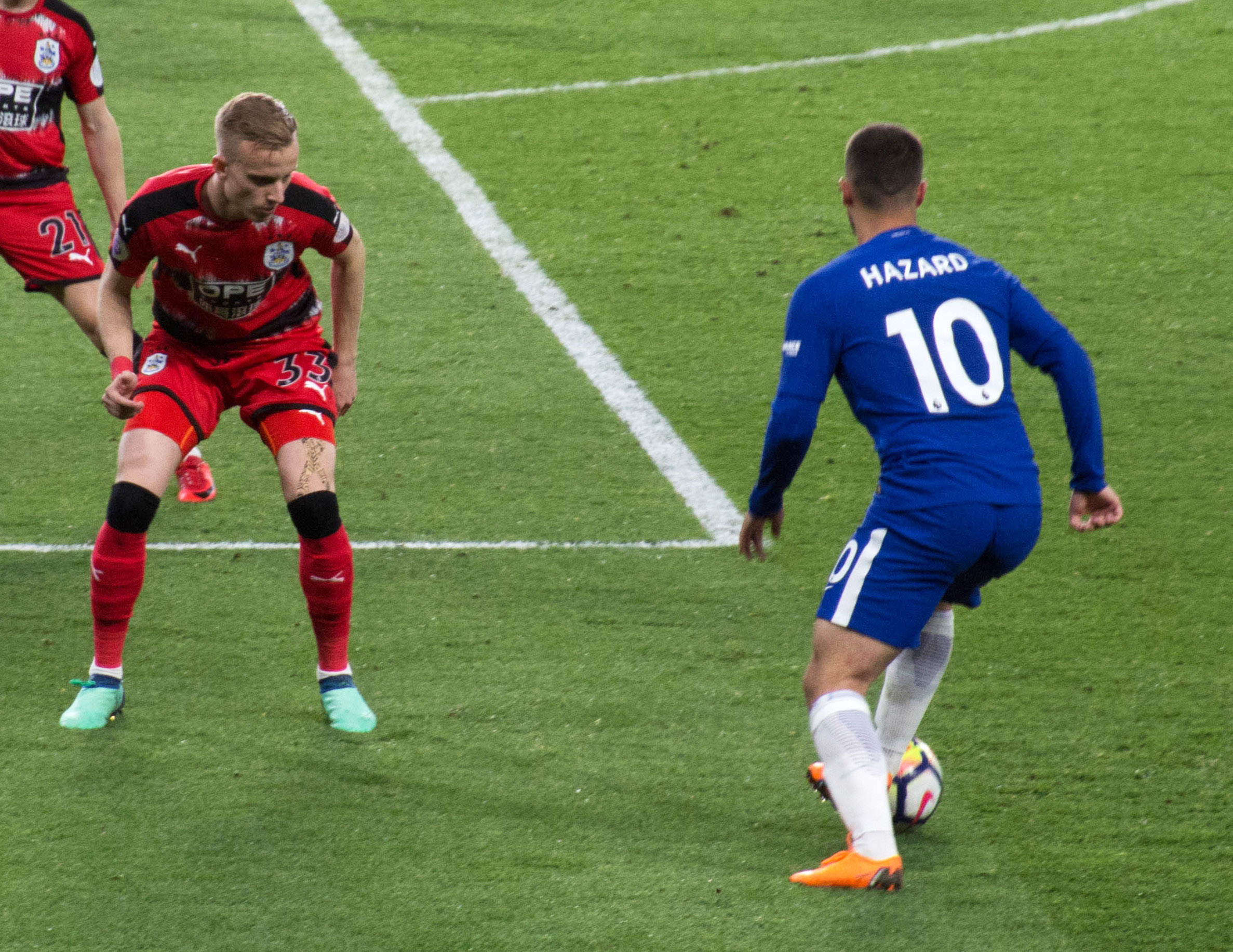
Hadergjonaj (left) with Huddersfield Town in 2018

On 24 August 2017, Hadergjonaj joined Premier League side Huddersfield Town, on a season-long loan. On 19 September 2017, he made his debut with Huddersfield Town in the 2017–18 EFL Cup third round against Crystal Palace after being named in the starting line-up.

=== Return to Huddersfield Town ===
On 8 March 2018, Huddersfield Town triggered a clause in Hadergjonaj's loan agreement to make his transfer permanent. On 1 July 2018, he signed for Huddersfield Town on a three-year contract with a club option of a further season. On 11 August 2018, he made his debut in a 3–0 home defeat against Chelsea after being named in the starting line-up.

==== Loan at Kasımpaşa ====
On 31 January 2020, Hadergjonaj joined Süper Lig side Kasımpaşa, on a six-month-long loan. Two days later, he made his debut in a 1–1 away draw against Ankaragücü after being named in the starting line-up.

=== Return to Kasımpaşa ===
On 25 September 2020, Hadergjonaj signed a three-year contract with Süper Lig club Kasımpaşa. One day later, he made his debut in a 1–0 away defeat against Hatayspor after being named in the starting line-up.

== International career ==
=== Switzerland ===
==== Under-20 ====
On 15 November 2013, Hadergjonaj made his debut with Switzerland U20 in a friendly match against Poland U20 after being named in the starting line-up.

==== Under-21 ====
On 4 April 2014, Hadergjonaj made his debut with Switzerland U21 in a 2015 UEFA European Under-21 Championship qualification match against Ukraine U21 after being named in the starting line-up.

==== Senior ====
I will only play the friendly match as I have not agreed to play and be blocked for the qualifiers.

— Hadergjonaj before the gathering with Switzerland, May 2017.

On 22 May 2017, Hadergjonaj received a call-up from Switzerland for the friendly match against Belarus and the 2018 FIFA World Cup qualification match against Faroe Islands. On 1 June 2017, he made his debut with Switzerland in a friendly match against Belarus after coming on as a substitute at 46th minute in place of Silvan Widmer.

=== Kosovo ===
On 9 May 2019, The Football Federation of Kosovo confirmed that Hadergjonaj had obtained a Kosovan passport and was ready to play for the Kosovo national team in the next UEFA Euro 2020 qualifying matches. On 22 May 2019, Hadergjonaj received a call-up from Kosovo for the UEFA Euro 2020 qualifying matches against Montenegro and Bulgaria.

== Career statistics ==
=== Club ===
As of match played 03:46, 26 April 2021 (UTC).

Appearances and goals by club, season and competition
Club	Season	League			National Cup		League Cup		Continental (Note: Including continental competitions, such as UEFA Champions League and UEFA Europa League)		Total	
Club	Season	Division	Apps	Goals	Apps	Goals	Apps	Goals	Apps	Goals	Apps	Goals
Young Boys	2013–14	Swiss Super League	11	1	1	0	—		0	0	12	1
Young Boys	2014–15	Swiss Super League	26	0	1	0	—		8	0	35	0
Young Boys	2015–16	Swiss Super League	32	0	3	0	—		2	0	37	0
Young Boys	2016–17	Swiss Super League	2	0	0	0	—		2	0	4	0
Young Boys	Total		71	1	5	0	—		12	0	88	1
Ingolstadt 04	2016–17	Bundesliga	25	1	0	0	—				25	1
Ingolstadt 04	2017–18	2. Bundesliga	2	0	0	0	—				2	0
Ingolstadt 04	Total		27	1	0	0	—				27	1
Huddersfield Town (loan)	2017–18	Premier League	23	0	3	0	1	0	—		27	0
Huddersfield Town	2018–19	Premier League	24	0	0	0	0	0	—		24	0
Kasımpaşa (loan)	2019–20	Süper Lig	13	0	0	0	—				13	0
Kasımpaşa	2020–21	Süper Lig	33	1	2	0	—				35	1
Career total			179	3	10	0	1	0	12	0	202	3

=== International ===
Appearances and goals by national team and year
National team	Year	Apps	Goals
Switzerland	2017	1	0
Kosovo	2019	7	0
Kosovo	2020	8	1
Kosovo	2021	7	0
Kosovo	2022	3	0
Kosovo	2023	7	0
Kosovo	2024	5	0
Kosovo	2025	1	0
Kosovo	2026	1	0
Total		39	1

Scores and results list Kosovo's goal tally first, score column indicates score after each Hadergjonaj goal.

List of international goals scored by Florent Hadergjonaj
No.	Date	Venue	Opponent	Score	Result	Competition
1	8 October 2020	Toše Proeski Arena, Skopje, North Macedonia	North Macedonia	1–1	1–2	UEFA Euro 2020 qualifying play-offs

== Honours ==
Individual

- Young Boys' player of the year: 2014–15
