= Maurizio Scioscia =

Italian-German footballer

Personal information
- Date of birth: 6 December 1991 (age 34)
- Height: 1.76 m (5 ft 9 in)
- Position: Right-back

Youth career
- –2012: 1. FC Heidenheim

Senior career*
Years	Team	Apps	(Gls)
2012–2016	1. FC Heidenheim	5	(0)
2016–2017	Stuttgarter Kickers	22	(1)
2018	Wacker Burghausen	9	(2)
2018–2019	FV Illertissen	19	(1)
- * Club domestic league appearances and goals

Maurizio Scioscia (born 6 December 1991) is an Italian-German former footballer who played as a right-back.

== Career ==
He made his 3. Liga debut for 1. FC Heidenheim in September 2012, as a substitute for Marco Sailer in a 2–0 win over SV Darmstadt 98.
