= Almog Cohen (footballer) =

Israeli footballer

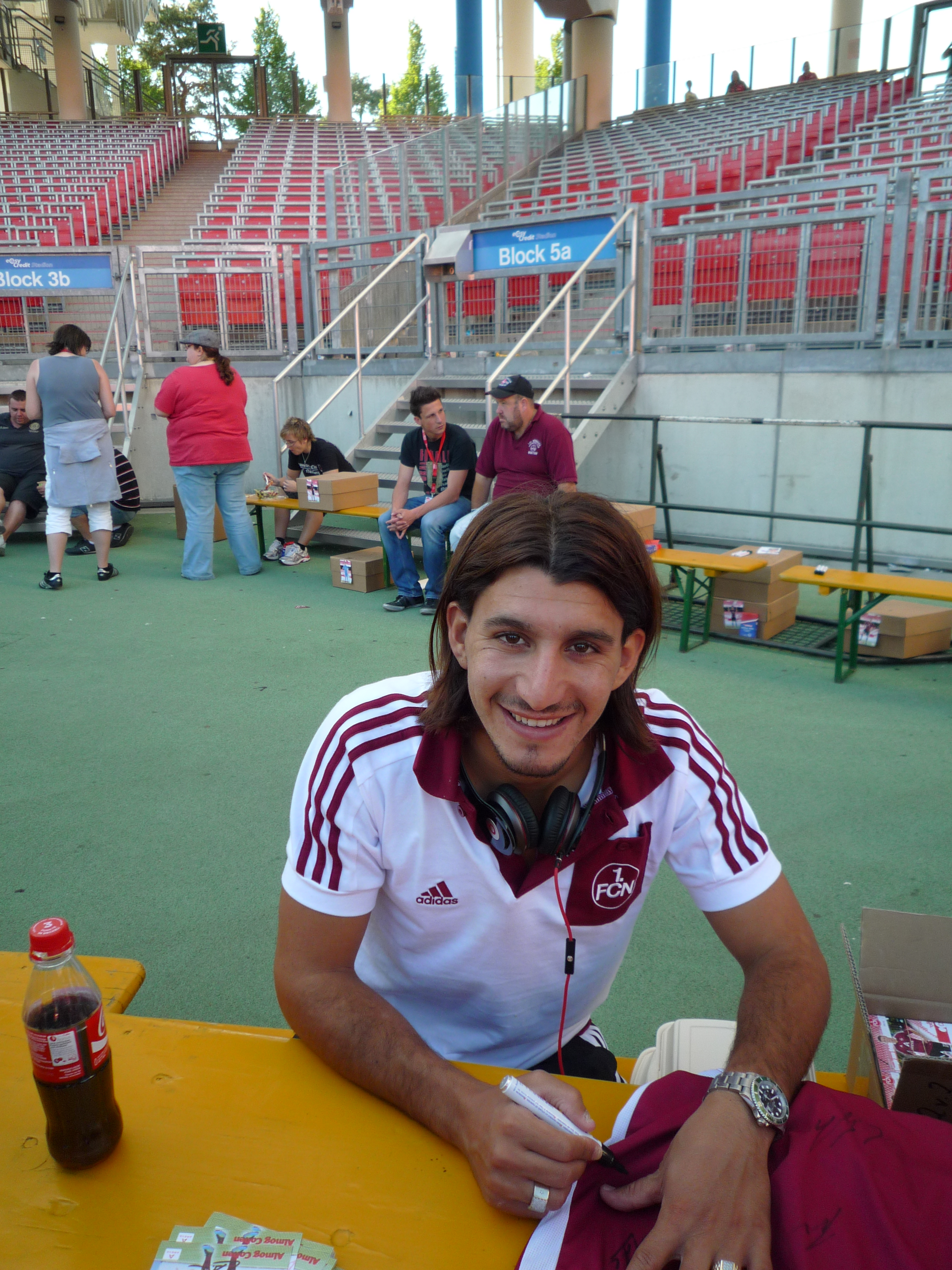
- Cohen signing autographs for 1. FC Nürnberg fans in 2011

Personal information
- Date of birth: 1 September 1988 (age 38)
- Place of birth: Beersheba, Israel
- Height: 1.70 m (5 ft 7 in)
- Position: Defensive midfielder

Team information
- Current team: Beitar Jerusalem

Youth career
- 1998–2006: Beitar Tubruk
- 2006–2007: Maccabi Netanya

Senior career*
Years	Team	Apps	(Gls)
2007–2010	Maccabi Netanya	89	(8)
2010–2013	1. FC Nürnberg	58	(2)
2013	→ Hapoel Tel Aviv (loan)	12	(1)
2013–2019	FC Ingolstadt	126	(11)
2019–2022	Maccabi Netanya	53	(0)
Total		338	(22)

International career
2007–2010	Israel U21	17	(0)
2010–2019	Israel	27	(0)
- * Club domestic league appearances and goals

Almog Cohen (Hebrew: אלמוג כהן; born 1 September 1988) is an Israeli former professional footballer who works as sporting director for Israeli Premier League side Beitar Jerusalem.

== Early life ==
Cohen was born in Beersheba, Israel, to a Sephardic Jewish family.

== Career ==
Cohen began his career with Beitar Tubruk and signed for Maccabi Netanya in summer 2006. In February 2010, Maccabi Netanya confirmed that he was set to join 1. FC Nürnberg in the 2010 summer transfer window. He made his league debut for the club on the third day of the 2010–11 Bundesliga season, starting Nürnberg's match at Hamburger SV. Coincidentally, his debut goal in the Bundesliga was also against Hamburg, Nürnberg won the game 2–0 with Cohen scoring the second goal of the match.

He spent five months on loan at Hapoel Tel Aviv in 2013.

On 30 July 2013, he joined FC Ingolstadt on a three-year contract. On 22 April 2016, he extended his contract until 2018.

On 25 June 2019, Cohen returned to Maccabi Netanya on a four-year contract.

On 14 February 2022, Cohen retired from playing after struggling with injuries and became Maccabi Netanya's new sporting director.

== International career ==
Cohen represented the Israel U21 national team and the senior side.

== Career statistics ==
=== Club ===
Appearances and goals by club, season and competition
Club	Season	League			National cup		League cup		Continental		Total	
Club	Season	Division	Apps	Goals	Apps	Goals	Apps	Goals	Apps	Goals	Apps	Goals
Maccabi Netanya	2006–07	Ligat ha'Al	7	0	0	0	4	0	0	0	11	0
Maccabi Netanya	2007–08	Ligat ha'Al	28	0	4	0	5	0	0	0	37	0
Maccabi Netanya	2008–09	Ligat ha'Al	23	1	3	0	6	0	0	0	32	1
Maccabi Netanya	2009–10	Ligat ha'Al	31	7	1	0	1	0	4	0	37	7
Maccabi Netanya	Total		89	8	8	0	16	0	4	0	117	8
1. FC Nürnberg	2010–11	Bundesliga	25	2	2	0	0	0	0	0	27	2
1. FC Nürnberg	2011–12	Bundesliga	24	0	2	0	0	0	0	0	26	0
1. FC Nürnberg	2012–13	Bundesliga	9	0	0	0	0	0	0	0	9	0
1. FC Nürnberg	Total		58	2	4	0	0	0	0	0	62	2
Hapoel Tel Aviv (loan)	2012–13	Ligat ha'Al	12	1	2	0	0	0	0	0	14	1
FC Ingolstadt	2013–14	2. Bundesliga	22	1	3	0	0	0	0	0	25	1
FC Ingolstadt	2014–15	2. Bundesliga	5	0	0	0	0	0	0	0	5	0
FC Ingolstadt	2015–16	Bundesliga	20	0	0	0	0	0	0	0	20	0
FC Ingolstadt	2016–17	Bundesliga	31	7	2	0	0	0	0	0	33	7
FC Ingolstadt	2017–18	2. Bundesliga	27	2	3	1	0	0	0	0	30	3
FC Ingolstadt	2018–19	2. Bundesliga	21	1	0	0	0	0	0	0	21	1
FC Ingolstadt	Total		126	11	8	1	0	0	0	0	134	12
Maccabi Netanya	2019-20	Ligat ha'Al	24	0	1	0	3	0	0	0	28	0
Maccabi Netanya	2020–21	Ligat ha'Al	24	0	1	0	1	0	0	0	26	0
Maccabi Netanya	2021–22	Ligat ha'Al	5	0	0	0	4	0	0	0	9	0
Maccabi Netanya	Total		53	0	2	0	8	0	0	0	63	0
Career total			338	22	24	1	24	0	4	0	390	23

=== International ===
Appearances and goals by national team and year
National team	Year	Competitive		Friendly		Total	
National team	Year	Apps	Goals	Apps	Goals	Apps	Goals
Israel	2010	4	0	1	0	5	0
Israel	2011	4	0	2	0	6	0
Israel	2012	1	0	1	0	2	0
Israel	2013	0	0	0	0	0	0
Israel	2014	0	0	0	0	0	0
Israel	2015	0	0	0	0	0	0
Israel	2016	3	0	1	0	4	0
Israel	2017	5	0	1	0	6	0
Israel	2018	1	0	1	0	2	0
Total		18	0	7	0	25	0

== Honours ==
Maccabi Netanya

- Israeli Premier League runner-up: 2006–07, 2007–08

FC Ingolstadt

- 2. Bundesliga: 2014–15
