= Marvin Matip =

Footballer (born 1985)

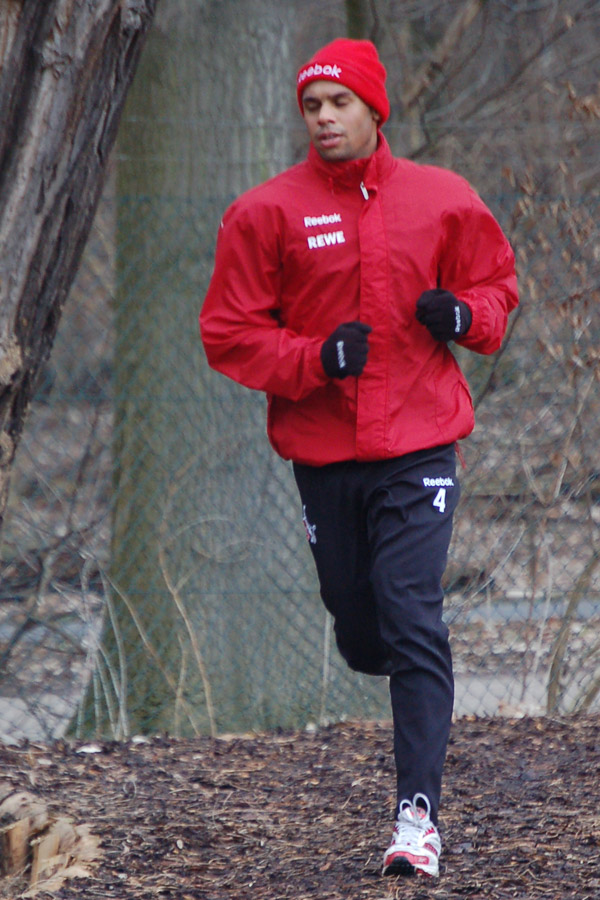
- Matip during his time at 1. FC Köln

Personal information
- Full name: Marvin Job Matip
- Date of birth: 25 September 1985 (age 41)
- Place of birth: Bochum, West Germany
- Height: 1.84 m (6 ft 0 in)
- Position: Centre-back

Youth career
- 1992–1994: SC Weitmar 45
- 1994–2004: VfL Bochum

Senior career*
Years	Team	Apps	(Gls)
2004–2005	VfL Bochum II	33	(3)
2004–2005	VfL Bochum	1	(0)
2005–2006	1. FC Köln II	3	(1)
2005–2010	1. FC Köln	87	(1)
2010	→ Karlsruher SC (loan)	13	(1)
2010–2019	FC Ingolstadt	263	(11)
Total		400	(17)

International career
2004–2007	Germany U21	22	(1)
2013–2016	Cameroon	3	(0)
- * Club domestic league appearances and goals

Marvin Job Matip (born 25 September 1985) is a former professional footballer who played as a centre-back. Born in Germany, he represented the Cameroon national team at international level.

== Club career ==
Born in Bochum, Matip began his career with VfL Bochum, but moved to 1. FC Köln in 2005. On 1 February 2010, he was loaned to Karlsruher SC.

== International career ==
Matip represented German youth sides at Under 19 and Under-21 level in competitions including the 2005 FIFA World Youth Championship and the 2006 UEFA European Under-21 Football Championship, but was called up to the Cameroon national team in 2007 after announcing his desire to represent Cameroon. However, his career with Cameroon was delayed after the correct paperwork was not filed with FIFA in time. He made his international debut with Les Lions Indomptables in a friendly match against Ukraine on 2 June 2013.

== Personal life ==
Matip was born to a Cameroonian father and a German mother, and as such was eligible to represent either nation.

His father Jean is a former footballer and his brother Joël Matip formerly played for Liverpool. He is also a cousin of Joseph-Désiré Job.
