= Audi Sportpark =

Football stadium in Ingolstadt, Germany

Audi-Sportpark

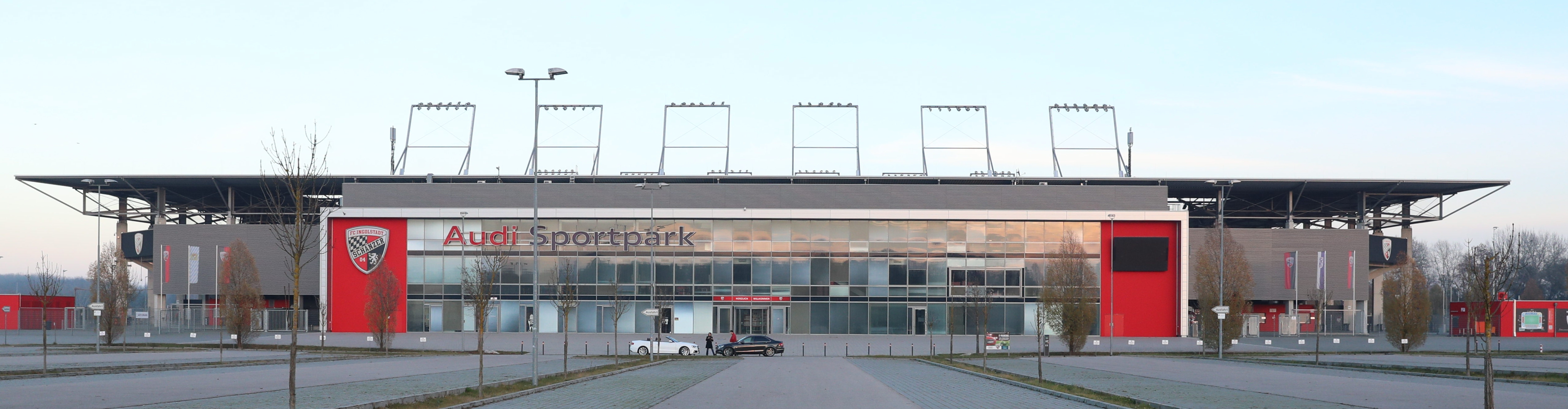
- Audi-Sportpark (2020)
- Interactive map of Audi-Sportpark
- Full name: Audi-Sportpark
- Location: Ingolstadt, Germany
- Coordinates: 48°44′44″N 11°29′8″E
- Owner: Audi Immobilien Verwaltung GmbH
- Operator: FC Ingolstadt 04 Stadionbetreiber GmbH
- Capacity: 15,800
- Executive suites: 18
- Surface: grass

Construction
- Groundbreaking: 2009
- Opened: 24 July 2010
- Cost: € 20 million
- Architect: arteplan GmbH

Tenants
- FC Ingolstadt 04 (2010–present); Germany national football team (selected matches)

Audi-Sportpark (German pronunciation: [ˈʔaʊdiːˌʃpɔʁtpaʁk] is a 15,800-capacity stadium in Ingolstadt, Bavaria, Germany. It is primarily used for football and is the home of FC Ingolstadt 04.

In European competitions, the stadium is known as FC Ingolstadt 04 Arena due to advertising rules.

== See also ==
- List of football stadiums in Germany
- Lists of stadiums
