= Roger Bernardo =

Brazilian footballer (born 1985)

Personal information
- Full name: Roger de Oliveira Bernardo
- Date of birth: 10 August 1985 (age 41)
- Place of birth: Rio Claro, Brazil
- Height: 1.80 m (5 ft 11 in)
- Position: Defensive midfielder

Team information
- Current team: Rio Claro

Youth career
- 2000–2004: União São João
- 2004: Santo André
- 2005: Palmeiras

Senior career*
Years	Team	Apps	(Gls)
2005–2008	Palmeiras	24	(0)
2006	→ América-SP (loan)		
2007	→ Ponte Preta (loan)		
2007	→ Juventude (loan)		
2008	→ Guarani (loan)	0	(0)
2008–2009	Figueirense		
2009–2012	Energie Cottbus	67	(1)
2012–2017	Ingolstadt 04	157	(2)
2017–2018	Atlético Mineiro	11	(0)
2018	Hapoel Tel Aviv	5	(0)
2019	Villa Nova	3	(0)
2019	Rio Claro	8	(1)
2020–	Inter de Limeira	12	(0)
2021–	→ Rio Claro (loan)	0	(0)
- * Club domestic league appearances and goals as of 14:10, 29 April 2019 (UTC)

Roger de Oliveira Bernardo (born 10 August 1985), known as Roger Bernardo or simply Roger, is a Brazilian professional footballer who plays as a defensive midfielder for Rio Claro.

== Career ==
He has played in Brazil for the majority of his career, spending eight years in Germany with FC Energie Cottbus and FC Ingolstadt 04 before returning to his home country to join Atlético Mineiro in 2017. He left the club in May 2018 after terminating his contract and joined Hapoel Tel Aviv in July 2018.
