= Manuel Gräfe =

German football referee

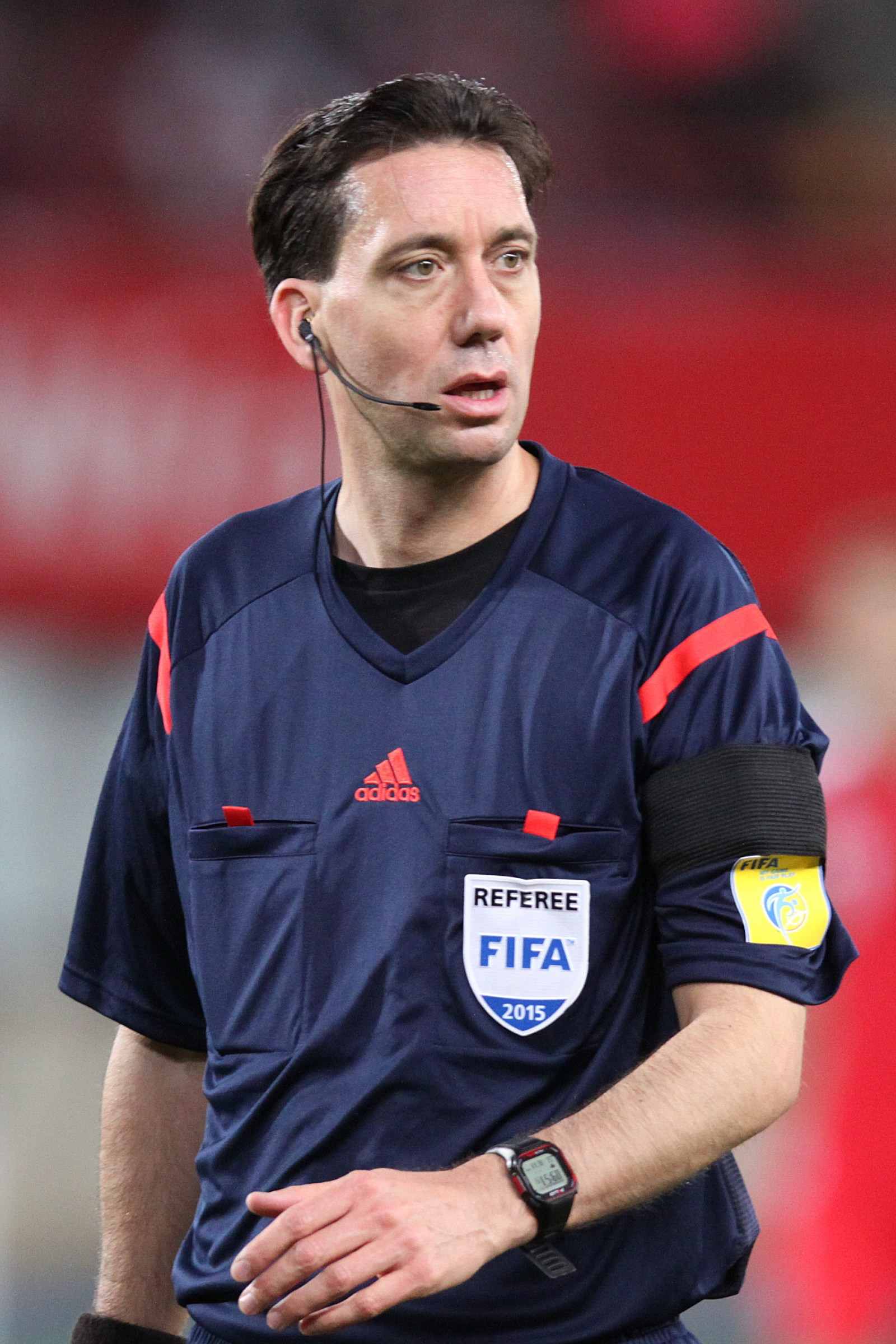
- Gräfe in 2015
- Born: 21 September 1973 (age 53); West Berlin
- Other occupation: Sports scientist

Domestic
Years	League	Role
1999–2021	DFB	Referee
2001–2021	2. Bundesliga	Referee
2004–2021	Bundesliga	Referee

International
Years	League	Role
2007–2018	FIFA listed	Referee

Manuel Gräfe (born 21 September 1973) is a former German football referee. He refereed for Hertha 03 Zehlendorf of the Berlin Football Association. He was a FIFA referee between 2007 and 2018.

== Refereeing career ==
Gräfe officiated in the 2. Bundesliga from 2001 to 2004 and in the Bundesliga from 2004 until his retirement in 2021. He received his FIFA license in 2007.

He refereed his final match on 22 May 2021, which was between Borussia Dortmund and Bayer 04 Leverkusen.

== Age discrimination claim ==
The refereeing age limit of 47 is set by the Bundesliga. In July 2021 Gräfe stated he was taking legal action against the German football federation (DFB) over alleged age discrimination, and separately petitions were launched. Fellow former-FIFA referee Markus Merk however stated 'It is a problem in our society that the old cannot let go and that the chances of advancement are more difficult for the descendants. We need change and permeability.' Gräfe indicated he was not seeking to return to refereeing even if the case was successful.

== Personal life ==
Gräfe, a professional sports scientist, lives in Berlin.

== See also ==
- List of football referees
