= 2017–18 SV Darmstadt 98 season =

Darmstadt 98
2017–18 season
- Chairman: Klaus Rüdiger Fritsch
- Manager: Torsten Frings (until 9 December); Dirk Schuster (from 11 December)
- Stadium: Merck-Stadion am Böllenfalltor
- 2. Bundesliga: 10th
- DFB-Pokal: First round
- Top goalscorer: League: Tobias Kempe (11); All: Tobias Kempe (11)
- Highest home attendance: 17,400
- Lowest home attendance: 13,650
- Average home league attendance: 15,848
- Biggest win: Darmstadt 3–0 St Pauli; Jahn Regensburg 0–3 Darmstadt
- Biggest defeat: FC Ingolstadt 3–0 Darmstadt
Home colours	Away colours	Third colours

The 2017–18 SV Darmstadt 98 season was the 120th season in the football club's history and their 18th overall season in the second tier of German football, the 2. Bundesliga. It was the club's first season return in the second division, since relegation from the Bundesliga in 2016–17.

== Squad ==
=== Appearances and goals ===
No.	Pos	Nat	Player	Total		2. Bundesliga		DFB-Pokal	
No.	Pos	Nat	Player	Apps	Goals	Apps	Goals	Apps	Goals
Goalkeepers
1	GK	(Portugal) POR	Daniel Heuer Fernandes	29	0	28	0	1	0
23	GK	(Switzerland) SUI	Joël Mall	5	0	5	0	0	0
31	GK	(Germany) GER	Florian Stritzel	1	0	1	0	0	0
Defenders
2	DF	(Brazil) BRA	João Renato da Cunha	0	0	0	0	0	0
3	DF	(Brazil) BRA	Joevin Jones	16	4	16	4	0	0
4	DF	(Turkey) TUR	Aytaç Sulu	34	3	33	3	1	0
13	DF	(Germany) GER	Markus Steinhöfer	16	0	15	0	1	0
17	DF	(Germany) GER	Sandro Sirigu	19	0	19	0	0	0
19	DF	(Germany) GER	Kevin Großkreutz	28	3	27	3	1	0
21	DF	(Germany) GER	Immanuel Höhn	19	1	19	1	0	0
28	DF	(Germany) GER	Leo Petri	0	0	0	0	0	0
32	DF	(Germany) GER	Fabian Holland	32	1	32	1	0	0
33	DF	(France) FRA	Romain Bregerie	14	1	14	1	0	0
35	DF	(Germany) GER	Niklas Kern	0	0	0	0	0	0
39	DF	(Germany) GER	Paul Schmieder	0	0	0	0	0	0
-	DF	(Denmark) DEN	Patrick Banggaard	9	0	8	0	1	0
Midfielders
5	MF	(Serbia) SRB	Slobodan Medojevic	12	0	12	0	0	0
6	MF	(Germany) GER	Marvin Mehlem	21	2	21	2	0	0
8	MF	(Germany) GER	Julian Von Haacke	6	0	5	0	1	0
9	MF	(South Korea) KOR	Ji Dong-Won	16	2	16	2	0	0
10	MF	(Germany) GER	Jan Rosenthal	12	0	12	0	0	0
11	MF	(Germany) GER	Tobias Kempe	31	11	30	11	1	0
18	MF	(Germany) GER	Peter Niemeyer	4	0	4	0	0	0
25	MF	(Germany) GER	Yannick Stark	29	3	29	3	0	0
28	MF	(Turkey) TUR	Baris Atik	5	0	5	0	0	0
34	MF	(Turkey) TUR	Hamit Altintop	4	0	4	0	0	0
36	MF	(Democratic Republic of the Congo) COD	Wilson Kamavuaka	26	2	25	2	1	0
38	MF	(France) FRA	Romuald Lacazette	4	0	3	0	1	0
-	MF	(Turkey) TUR	Hamit Altintop	8	0	7	0	1	0
Forwards
7	FW	(Germany) GER	Felix Platte	21	5	21	5	0	0
15	FW	(United States) USA	Terrence Boyd	24	4	24	4	0	0
20	DF	(Poland) POL	Artur Sobiech	23	3	22	2	1	1
27	FW	(United States) USA	McKinze Gaines	3	0	2	0	1	0
40	FW	(Germany) GER	Silas Zehnder	0	0	0	0	0	0
-	FW	(Australia) AUS	Jamie Maclaren	8	0	7	0	1	0
-	MF	(Slovenia) SLO	Roman Bezjak	8	0	7	0	1	0

Last updated: 13 May 2018
Source: Competitions

=== Transfers ===
==== In ====
No.	Pos.	Name	Age	NAT	EU	Moving from	Type	Transfer Window	Contract ends	Transfer fee	Sources
8	Midfielder	Julian Von Haacke	23	Germany	Yes	NEC Nijmegen	Transfer	Summer	30 June 2020	€200,000	
5	Midfielder	Slobodan Medojevic	27	Serbia	Yes	Eintracht Frankfurt	Transfer	Winter	30 June 2019		
5	Midfielder	Ji Dong-Won	26	South Korea	Yes	FC Augsburg	Loan	Winter	30 June 2018		
7	Forward	Felix Platte	21	Germany	Yes	FC Schalke 04	Transfer	Summer	30 June 2021	€800,000	
38	Midfielder	Romuald Lacazette	23	France	Yes	TSV 1860 Munich	Transfer	Summer	30 June 2020	Free	
9	Forward	Jamie Maclaren	23	Australia	No	Brisbane Roar	Transfer	Summer	30 June 2020	Free	
23	Goalkeeper	Joël Mall	30	Switzerland	Yes	Grasshopper Club Zürich	Transfer	Summer	30 June 2019	Free	
20	Forward	Artur Sobiech	27	Poland	Yes	Free agent	Transfer	Summer	30 June 2019	Free	
31	Goalkeeper	Florian Stritzel	23	Germany	Yes	Karlsruher SC	Transfer	Summer	30 June 2020	Free	
6	Midfielder	Marvin Mehlem	19	Germany	Yes	Karlsruher SC	Transfer	Summer	30 June 2020	€200,000	
27	Forward	McKinze Gaines	19	USA	No	VfL Wolfsburg	Transfer	Summer	30 June 2020	unknown	
11	Midfielder	Tobias Kempe	28	Germany	Yes	FC Nürnberg	Transfer	Summer	30 June 2020	unknown	
19	Defender	Kevin Grosskreutz	28	Germany	Yes	Free agent	Transfer	Summer	30 June 2019	Free	
14	Forward	Roman Bezjak	28	Slovenia	Yes	HNK Rijeka	Loan return	Summer	30 June 2019	Free	
25	Midfielder	Yannick Stark	26	Germany	Yes	FSV Frankfurt	Loan return	Summer	30 June 2018	Free	
40	Forward	Silas Zehnder	18	Germany	Yes	Darmstadt 98 U19	Transfer	Summer	30 June 2021	Free	
28	Defender	Leo Petri	18	Germany	Yes	Darmstadt 98 U19	Transfer	Summer	30 June 2018	Free	
39	Defender	Paul Schmieder	18	Germany	Yes	Darmstadt 98 U19	Transfer	Summer	30 June 2018	Free	
35	Defender	Niklas Kern	18	Germany	Yes	Darmstadt 98 U19	Transfer	Summer	30 June 2018	Free	
–	Forward	Manassé Eshele	18	Germany	Yes	Darmstadt 98 U19	Transfer	Summer	30 June 2020	Free	

==== Out ====
No.	Pos.	Name	Age	NAT	Moving to	Type	Transfer Window	Transfer fee	Sources
31	GK	Michael Esser	29	Germany	Hannover 96	Transfer	Summer	€2,000,000	
8	MF	Jérôme Gondorf	29	Germany	Werder Bremen	Transfer	Summer	€1,200,000	
8	MF	Mario Vrancic	28	Bosnia and Herzegovina	Norwich City	Transfer	Summer	€750,000	
–	FW	Manassé Eshele	18	Germany	FSV Frankfurt	Loan	Summer	–	
27	DF	Can Luka Aydogan	18	Germany	unknown	End of Contract	Summer	Free	
24	GK	Igor Berezovsky	26	Ukraine	unknown	End of Contract	Summer	Free	
5	GK	Benjamin Gorka	33	Germany	unknown	End of Contract	Summer	–	
37	FW	Liam Fisch	18	Germany	VfB Ginsheim	Transfer	Summer	Free	
35	DF	Johannes Wolff	18	Germany	unknown	End of Contract	Summer	–	
9	FW	Dominik Stroh-Engel	31	Germany	Karlsruher SC	End of Contract	Summer	Free	
22	FW	Denys Oliynyk	30	Ukraine	Desna Chernihiv	End of Contract	Summer	–	
38	DF	Daniel Thur	19	Germany	unknown	End of Contract	Summer	–	
20	FW	Marcel Heller	31	Germany	FC Augsburg	End of Contract	Summer	–	
7	DF	Artem Fedetskyy	32	Ukraine	Karpaty Lviv	End of Contract	Summer	–	
16	FW	Antonio Colak	23	Croatia	1899 Hoffenheim	End of Loan	Summer	–	
33	FW	Sidney Sam	29	Germany	Schalke 04	End of Loan	Summer	–	
19	FW	Felix Platte	21	Germany	Schalke 04	End of Loan	Summer	–	
2	FW	Leon Guwara	21	Germany	Werder Bremen	End of Loan	Summer	–	
39	FW	Sven Schipplock	28	Germany	Hamburger SV	End of Loan	Summer	–	

== Friendlies ==
=== Pre-season ===
Win Draw Loss

23 June 2017	SG Modau	0–8	Darmstadt 98	Ober-Ramstadt, Germany
17:30 CET (UTC+01:00)		Report	McKinze Gaines 17'; Holland 20'; Boyd 23', 34', 35', 42', 63'; Mehlem 72'	Stadium: Lohberg Arena; Attendance: 1600

1 July 2017	Viktoria Griesheim	0–8	Darmstadt 98	Griesheim, Germany
16:00 CET (UTC+01:00)		Report	Bezjak 16', 36', 56'; McKinze Gaines 19'; Boyd 57', 63'; Stark 65', 70'	Stadium: Stadion am Hegelsberg

7 July 2017	Wormatia Worms	0–4	Darmstadt 98	Worms, Germany
18:00 CET (UTC+01:00)		Report	McKinze Gaines 15'; Von Haacke 47'; Bezjak 75', 85'	Stadium: EWR-Arena; Attendance: 736

11 July 2017	Darmstadt 98	2–0	Association of Spanish Footballers	Windischgarsten, Austria
16:00 CET (UTC+01:00)	McKinze Gaines 41'; Steinhöfer 85'	[ Report]

11 July 2017	Darmstadt 98	3–0	FC Vysocina Jihlava	Windischgarsten, Austria
18:00 CET (UTC+01:00)	Boyd 13', 19'; Banggaard 32'	Report

16 July 2017	Darmstadt 98	4–3	SV Wallern	Windischgarsten, Austria
16:00 CET (UTC+01:00)	Mehlem 3'; Maclaren 19', 52'; Cunha 87'	Report	Lindorfer 4'; Zachhuber 38'; Ibrahimovic 60'

16 July 2017	Darmstadt 98	2–1	Çaykur Rizespor	Windischgarsten, Austria
18:00 CET (UTC+01:00)	Stark 24'; Kempe 72'	Report	Kwueke 3'

22 July 2017	Darmstadt 98	2–2	Fulham FC	Darmstadt, Germany
18:00 CET (UTC+01:00)	Sulu 43'; Mehlem 68'	Report	Sulu (o.g.); Fredericks 64'	Stadium: Merck-Stadion am Böllenfalltor

== Competitions ==
Win Draw Loss

=== Bundesliga ===
==== League table ====
Pos	Team	Pld	W	D	L	GF	GA	GD	Pts
8	Union Berlin	34	12	11	11	54	46	+8	47
9	FC Ingolstadt	34	12	9	13	47	45	+2	45
10	Darmstadt 98	34	10	13	11	47	45	+2	43
11	SV Sandhausen	34	11	10	13	35	33	+2	43
12	FC St. Pauli	34	11	10	13	35	48	−13	43

Source: DFB
Rules for classification: 1) Points; 2) Goal difference; 3) Goals scored

==== Matches ====
29 July 2017 1	Darmstadt 98	1–0	Greuther Fürth	Darmstadt
15:30 CET	Sulu 56'	Report		Stadium: Merck-Stadion am Böllenfalltor; Attendance: 16100; Referee: Sören Storks

4 August 2017 2	1. FC Kaiserslautern	1–1	Darmstadt 98	Kaiserslautern
20:30 CET	Halfar 39'	Report	Kamavuaka 72'	Stadium: Fritz-Walter-Stadion; Attendance: 30,786; Referee: Robert Hartmann

18 August 2017 3	Darmstadt 98	3–0	FC St. Pauli	Darmstadt
18:30 CET	Großkreutz 56'; Kempe 56'; Stark 56'	Report		Stadium: Merck-Stadion am Böllenfalltor; Attendance: 17,400; Referee: Arne Aarnink

25 August 2017 4	MSV Duisburg	1–2	Darmstadt 98	Duisburg
18:30 CET	Stoppelkamp 25'; Fröde (yellow card) 53'; Iljutcenko (yellow card) 85'	Summary	Marvin Mehlem 35'; Stark 88'; Maclaren (yellow card) 90+1'	Stadium: Schauinsland-Reisen-Arena; Attendance: 16,297; Referee: Matthias Jöllenbeck

10 September 2017 5	Darmstadt 98	1–2	VfL Bochum	Darmstadt
13:30 CET	Sulu 24'	Report	Diamantakos 81'; Kruse 86'	Stadium: Merck-Stadion am Böllenfalltor; Attendance: 16,000; Referee: Benedikt Kempkes

17 September 2017 6	Darmstadt 98	4–3	Arminia Bielefeld	Darmstadt
13:30 CET	Großkreutz 31' 64'; Hamit Altıntop (yellow card) 39'; Höhn 53'; Sobiech 84'	Report	Prietl (yellow card) 18'; Voglsammer 30'; Klos 35'; Behrendt (yellow card) 70'; Brandy 90+3'	Stadium: Merck-Stadion am Böllenfalltor; Attendance: 15,700; Referee: Florian Badstübner

20 September 2017 7	1. FC Heidenheim	2–2	Darmstadt 98	Heidenheim
18:30 CET	Dovedan 32'; Halloran 60'; Wittek (yellow card) 79'; Griesbeck (yellow card) 87'	Report	Sobiech 35'; Hamit Altıntop (yellow card) 51'; Sulu (yellow card) 55' (goal) 85'; Höhn (yellow card) 66' von Haacke (yellow card) 89'; Steinhöfer (yellow card) 90+1'	Stadium: Voith-Arena; Attendance: 10,500; Referee: (Germany) Patrick Alt

24 September 2017 8	Darmstadt 98	3–3	Dynamo Dresden	Darmstadt
13:30 CET	Marvin Mehlem (yellow card) 17'; Kempe 30' 90+2'; Sulu (yellow card) 79'; Großkreutz (yellow card) 80'; Boyd 90'	Report	Konrad 23' 34' 80'; Kreuzer (yellow card) 45+1'; Müller (yellow card) 54'; Ballas (yellow card) 58'; Lambertz (yellow card) 90+4'	Stadium: Merck-Stadion am Böllenfalltor; Attendance: 17,000; Referee: (Germany) Sven Waschitzki

29 September 2017 9	Ingolstadt 04	3–0	Darmstadt 98	Ingolstadt
18:30	Kutschke 30' (pen.) (yellow card) 34'; Pledl (yellow card) 39' (goal) 79'; Kittel 60'	Report	Höhn (yellow card) 37'; Sirigu (yellow card) 44'; Marvin Mehlem (yellow card) 53'	Stadium: Audi Sportpark; Attendance: 8,746; Referee: (Germany) Timo Gerach

16 October 2017 10	Darmstadt 98	3–4	1. FC Nürnberg	Darmstadt
20:30	Stark 6' (yellow card) 60'; Platte 72'; Löwen 87' (o.g.)	Report	Teuchert 23' 58'; Möhwald (yellow card) 36'; Ishak 51'; Leibold 74'	Stadium: Merck-Stadion am Böllenfalltor; Attendance: 17,100; Referee: (Germany) Bibiana Steinhaus

20 October 2017 11	Fortuna Düsseldorf	1–0	Darmstadt 98	Düsseldorf
18:30	Kujović 2'; Raman (yellow card) 16'; Neuhaus (yellow card) 69'; Hoffmann (yellow card) 90+2'	Report	Großkreutz (yellow card) 7'; Platte (yellow card) 63'; Holland (yellow card) 87'; Hamit Altıntop (yellow card) 90'	Stadium: Esprit Arena; Attendance: 27,674; Referee: (Germany) Frank Willenborg

28 October 2017 12	Darmstadt 98	1–1	Holstein Kiel	Darmstadt
13:00	Platte 5'; Hamit Altıntop (yellow card) 27'	Report	Kinsombi (yellow card) 33'; Drexler 42'; Mühling (yellow card) 78'; Peitz (yellow card) 88'	Stadium: Merck-Stadion am Böllenfalltor; Attendance: 15,500; Referee: (Germany) Benjamin Brand

4 November 2017 13	Eintracht Braunschweig	2–2	Darmstadt 98	Braunschweig
13:00	Sulu 8' (o.g.); Biada (yellow card) 27'; Yıldırım (yellow card) 88'; Schönfeld 90+2'	Report	Marvin Mehlem 30'; Kamavuaka 52'; Sobiech (yellow card) 57'; Stark (yellow card) 69'	Stadium: Eintracht-Stadion; Attendance: 20,190; Referee: (Germany) Patrick Alt

17 November 2017 14	Darmstadt 98	1–2	SV Sandhausen	Darmstadt
18:30	Großkreutz (yellow card) 42'; Holland (yellow card) 45+1'; Hamit Altıntop (yellow card) 55'; Sulu (yellow card) 60'; Banggaard 84' (yellow card) 87'; Marvin Mehlem (yellow card) 90+2'	Report	Sukuta-Pasu 17' 71'; Daghfous (yellow card) 64'; Jansen (yellow card) 65'	Stadium: Merck-Stadion am Böllenfalltor; Attendance: 14,650; Referee: (Germany) Christian Dietz

24 November 2017 15	Union Berlin	3–3	Darmstadt 98	Berlin
18:30	Prömel (yellow card) 2' (goal) 38'; Daube (yellow card) 45'; Polter 58' (pen.); Rosenthal 90+4' (o.g.)	Report	Sirigu (yellow card) 18'; Banggaard (yellow card) 27'; Boyd (yellow card) 29' (goal) 51' 61'; Kempe 66' (pen.); Hamit Altıntop (yellow card) 72'	Stadium: Alte Försterei; Attendance: 21,108; Referee: (Germany) Timo Gerach

3 December 2017 16	Darmstadt 98	0–1	Jahn Regensburg	Darmstadt
13:30	Kamavuaka (yellow card) 73'; Stark (yellow card) 80'	Report	Grüttner 52'; George (yellow card) 70'	Stadium: Merck-Stadion am Böllenfalltor; Attendance: 14,650; Referee: (Germany) Sven Waschitzki

8 December 2017 17	Erzgebirge Aue	1–0	Darmstadt 98	Aue
18:30	Soukou 35'	Report	Steinhöfer (yellow card) 13'; Sulu (yellow card) 50'; Sobiech (yellow card) 89'; Stark (yellow card) 90+4'	Stadium: Sparkassen-Erzgebirgsstadion; Attendance: 6,400; Referee: (Germany) Florian Heft

17 December 2017 18	Greuther Fürth	1–1	Darmstadt 98	Fürth
13:30	Caligiuri (yellow card) 13'; Wittek 45'; Raum (yellow card) 60'; Sontheimer (yellow card) 62'	Report	Kamavuaka (yellow card) 21'; Stark (yellow card) 64'; Hamit Altıntop (yellow card) 67' (goal) 90+4'; Bejak (yellow card) 77'	Stadium: Trolli Arena; Attendance: 8,210; Referee: (Germany) Tobias Reichel

24 January 2018 19	Darmstadt 98	P–P	1. FC Kaiserslautern	Darmstadt
18:30	Jones (yellow card) 20'; Medojevic (yellow card) 40'	Report	Jenssen (yellow card) 14'; Moritz (yellow card) 29'	Stadium: Merck-Stadion am Böllenfalltor; Attendance: 17,400; Referee: Bastian Dankert

28 January 2018 20	FC St. Pauli	0–1	Darmstadt 98	Hamburg
13:30	Zander (yellow card) 90+3'	Report	Jones 7'; Jones (yellow card) 32'; Kempe (yellow card) 80'	Stadium: Millerntor-Stadion; Attendance: 29,546; Referee: (Germany) Sascha Stegemann

4 February 2018 21	Darmstadt 98	1–2	MSV Duisburg	Darmstadt
13:30	Engin 17'; Bomheuer (yellow card) 77'; Iljutcenko 85'	Report	Ji 37'; Ji (yellow card) 53'; Niemeyer (yellow card) 64'; Medojevic (yellow card) 84'	Stadium: Merck-Stadion am Böllenfalltor; Attendance: 15,100; Referee: Lasse Koslowski

9 February 2018 22	VfL Bochum	2–1	Darmstadt 98	Bochum
18:30	Losilla (yellow card) 12'; Hinterseer (yellow card) 31'; Hinterseer 66'; Holland (o.g.)	Report	Bregerie 61'; Holland (yellow card) 76'	Stadium: rewirpowerSTADION; Attendance: 14,520; Referee: René Rode

17 February 2018 23	Arminia Bielefeld	2–0	Darmstadt 98	Bielefeld
13:00	Schütz (yellow card) 25'; Dick (yellow card) 31'; Weihrauch 33'; Staude (yellow card) 84'; Kerschbaumer 90+3'	Report	Sobiech (yellow card) 26'; Höhn (yellow card) 43'; Sulu (yellow card) 74'	Stadium: Schüco-Arena; Attendance: 15,236; Referee: Florian Badstübner

21 February 2018 19	Darmstadt 98	1–2	1. FC Kaiserslautern	Darmstadt
18:30	Kempe (yellow card) 43'; Platte 90+1'	Report	Borrello 43'; Mwene (yellow card) 56'; Mwene 61'	Stadium: Merck-Stadion am Böllenfalltor; Attendance: 17,400; Referee: Bibiana Steinhaus

25 February 2018 24	Darmstadt 98	1–1	1. FC Heidenheim	Darmstadt
13:30	Höhn 17; Großkreutz (yellow card) 18'; Kamavuaka (yellow card) 39'; Jones 60'	Report	Kraus 7'; Griesbeck (yellow card) 18'; Wittek (yellow card) 64'; Strauß (yellow card) 82'; Verhoek (yellow card) 90+2'	Stadium: Merck-Stadion am Böllenfalltor; Attendance: 13,650; Referee: Dr Martin Thomsen

2 March 2018 25	Dynamo Dresden	0–2	Darmstadt 98	Dresden
18:30	Kreuzer (yellow card) 78'	Report	Jones 29'; Kempe 55'	Stadium: DDV-Stadion Dresden; Attendance: 26,053; Referee: Tobias Reichel

10 March 2018 26	Darmstadt 98	1–1	Ingolstadt 04	Darmstadt
13:00	Stark (yellow card) 22'; Sulu (yellow card) 54'; Kempe (67 p); Ji (yellow card) 90'	Report	Leipertz 18'; Levels (yellow card) 37'; Gaus (yellow card) 42'; Schrök (yellow card) 45'; Wahl (yellow card) 75'	Stadium: Merck-Stadion am Böllenfalltor; Attendance: 14,000; Referee: Thorben Siewer

18 March 2018 27	1. FC Nürnberg	1–1	Darmstadt 98	Nürnberg
13:30	Möhwald (yellow card) 47'; Margreitter 78'	Report	Boyd 18'	Stadium: Grundig-Stadion; Attendance: 27007; Referee: Daniel Schlager

2 April 2018 28	Darmstadt 98	1–0	Fortuna Düsseldorf	Darmstadt
20:30	Holland (yellow card) 12' (yellow-red card); Kempe 38'; Sulu (yellow card) 43'; Kamavuaka (yellow card) 48'; Stark (yellow card) 75'; Jones (yellow card) 84'	Report	Schauerte (yellow card) 28'; Zimmer (yellow card) 83'	Stadium: Merck-Stadion am Böllenfalltor; Attendance: 17,400; Referee: Tobias Reichel

7 April 2018 29	Holstein Kiel	0–0	Darmstadt 98	Kiel
13:00	Patrick Herrmann (yellow card) 19'; Peitz (yellow card) 24'; Weilandt (yellow card) 80'	Report	Mehlem (yellow card) 55'	Stadium: Holstein-Stadion; Attendance: 10,483; Referee: René Rohde

15 April 2018 30	Darmstadt 98	1–1	Eintracht Braunschweig	Darmstadt
13:30	Sulu (yellow card) 52'; Kempe (73 p)	Report	Medojevic , 39' (o.g.); Hofmann (yellow card) 40'; Moll (yellow card) 62'	Stadium: Merck-Stadion am Böllenfalltor; Attendance: 16,226; Referee: Robert Hartmann

21 April 2018 31	SV Sandhausen	1–1	Darmstadt 98	Sandhausen
13:00	Linsmayer 10'; Stefan Kulovits (yellow card) 29'; Karl (yellow card) 46'; Sukuta-Pasu (yellow card) 62'; Förster (yellow card) 88'	Report	Mehlem 45+1'; Kempe (50 p); Medojevic (yellow card) 82'	Stadium: Hardtwaldstadion; Attendance: 10,269; Referee: Timo Gerach

28 April 2018 32	Darmstadt 98	3–1	Union Berlin	Darmstadt
13:00	Holland 12'; Platte 22', 35'	Report	Fürstner (yellow card) 9'; Trimmel (yellow card) 21'; Redondo (yellow card) 79'; Parensen 87'	Stadium: Merck-Stadion am Böllenfalltor; Attendance: 16,570; Referee: Thorben Siewer

6 May 2018 33	Jahn Regensburg	0–3	Darmstadt 98	Regensburg
15:30	Geipl (yellow card) 52'	Report	Jones 29'; Kempe; (yellow card) 41'; Dong-Won Ji 68'; Kempe 73'	Stadium: Continental Arena; Attendance: 15,210; Referee: Sven Jablonski

13 May 2018 34	Darmstadt 98	1–0	Erzgebirge Aue	Darmstadt
	Holland (yellow card) 72'; Kempe 86'	Summary	Köpke (yellow card) 64'; Fandrich (yellow card) 81'	Stadium: Merck-Stadion am Böllenfalltor; Attendance: 17,400; Referee: Sören Storks

=== DFB-Pokal ===
12 August 2017 First round	Jahn Regensburg	3–1	Darmstadt 98	Regensburg
18:30 CEST (UTC+02:00)	Lais 45+2' (pen.); Nietfeld 86'; Grüttner 90+4'	Report	Sobiech 40'	Stadium: Continental Arena; Attendance: 8,919; Referee: Martin Petersen
