= 2016–17 SV Darmstadt 98 season =

Darmstadt 98
2016–17 season
- Chairman: Klaus Rüdiger Fritsch
- Manager: Norbert Meier (until 5 December); Ramon Berndroth (interim, 5–27 December); Torsten Frings (from 3 January)
- Stadium: Jonathan-Heimes-Stadion am Böllenfalltor
- Bundesliga: 18th (relegated)
- DFB-Pokal: Second round
- Top goalscorer: League: Antonio Čolak; Mario Vrančić (4 goals each); All: Antonio Čolak (7 goals)
- Highest home attendance: 17,400
- Lowest home attendance: 15,000
- Average home league attendance: 16,794
- Biggest win: Bremer SV 0–7 Darmstadt
- Biggest defeat: Dortmund 6–0 Darmstadt
Home colours	Away colours	Third colours
- All statistics correct as of 27 May 2017.

The 2016–17 SV Darmstadt 98 season is the 119th season in the football club's history and 2nd consecutive and 4th overall season in the top flight of German football, the Bundesliga, having been promoted from the 2. Bundesliga in 2015. Darmstadt 98 will also participate in this season's edition of the domestic cup, the DFB-Pokal. It is the 96th season for Darmstadt in the Jonathan-Heimes-Stadion am Böllenfalltor, located in Darmstadt, Germany. The season covers a period from 1 July 2016 to 30 June 2017.

== Players ==
=== Squad ===
Note: Flags indicate national team as defined under FIFA eligibility rules; some limited exceptions apply. Players may hold more than one non-FIFA nationality.

No.	Pos.	Nation	Player
1	GK	POR	Daniel Heuer Fernandes
2	DF	GER	Leon Guwara (on loan from Werder Bremen)
3	DF	SWE	Alexander Milošević (on loan from Beşiktaş)
4	DF	TUR	Aytaç Sulu (Captain)
5	DF	GER	Benjamin Gorka
6	MF	BIH	Mario Vrančić
7	DF	UKR	Artem Fedetskyi
8	MF	GER	Jérôme Gondorf
9	FW	GER	Dominik Stroh-Engel
10	MF	GER	Jan Rosenthal
13	DF	GER	Markus Steinhöfer
15	FW	USA	Terrence Boyd
16	FW	CRO	Antonio Čolak (on loan from 1899 Hoffenheim)
17	DF	GER	Sandro Sirigu
18	MF	GER	Peter Niemeyer
19	FW	GER	Felix Platte (on loan from Schalke 04)

No.	Pos.	Nation	Player
20	MF	GER	Marcel Heller
21	DF	GER	Immanuel Höhn
22	FW	UKR	Denys Oliynyk
24	GK	UKR	Ihor Berezovskyi
26	DF	DEN	Patrick Banggaard
31	GK	GER	Michael Esser
32	DF	GER	Fabian Holland
33	FW	GER	Sidney Sam (on loan from Schalke 04)
34	MF	TUR	Hamit Altıntop
35	MF	GER	Johannes Wolff
36	DF	COD	Wilson Kamavuaka
36	DF	GER	Can Luca Aydogan
37	MF	GER	Liam Fisch
38	MF	GER	Daniel Thur
39	FW	GER	Sven Schipplock (on loan from Hamburger SV)

== Competitions ==
Win Draw Loss

=== Overview ===
Competition	First match	Last match	Starting round	Final position	Record							
Competition	First match	Last match	Starting round	Final position	Pld	W	D	L	GF	GA	GD	Win %
Bundesliga	27 August 2016	20 May 2017	Matchday 1	18th (relegated)	34	7	4	23	28	63	−35	20.59
DFB-Pokal	21 August 2016	26 October 2016	First round	Second round	2	1	0	1	7	1	+6	50.00
Total					36	8	4	24	35	64	−29	22.22

Last updated: 27 May 2017
Source: Competitions

=== Bundesliga ===
==== League table ====
Pos	Team	Pld	W	D	L	GF	GA	GD	Pts	Qualification or relegation
14	Hamburger SV	34	10	8	16	33	61	−28	38	
15	Mainz 05	34	10	7	17	44	55	−11	37	
16	VfL Wolfsburg (O)	34	10	7	17	34	52	−18	37	Qualification for the relegation play-offs
17	FC Ingolstadt (R)	34	8	8	18	36	57	−21	32	Relegation to 2. Bundesliga
18	Darmstadt 98 (R)	34	7	4	23	28	63	−35	25	Relegation to 2. Bundesliga

Source: DFB
Rules for classification: 1) Points; 2) Goal difference; 3) Goals scored; 4) Head-to-head points; 5) Head-to-head goal difference; 6) Head-to-head away goals scored; 7) Away goals scored; 8) Play-off.
(O) Play-off winners; (R) Relegated

==== Results summary ====
Overall								Home						Away					
Pld	W	D	L	GF	GA	GD	Pts	W	D	L	GF	GA	GD	W	D	L	GF	GA	GD
34	7	4	23	28	63	−35	25	6	3	8	18	25	−7	1	1	15	10	38	−28

Last updated: 27 May 2017.
Source: Bundesliga

==== Results by round ====
Round	1	2	3	4	5	6	7	8	9	10	11	12	13	14	15	16	17	18	19	20	21	22	23	24	25	26	27	28	29	30	31	32	33	34
Ground	A	H	A	H	A	H	A	H	H	A	H	A	H	A	H	A	H	H	A	H	A	H	A	H	A	A	H	A	H	A	H	A	H	A
Result	L	W	L	D	L	D	L	W	L	L	L	L	L	L	L	L	D	L	L	W	L	L	L	W	L	L	L	L	W	W	W	L	L	D
Position	16	12	14	14	14	14	15	13	14	15	15	15	16	18	18	18	18	18	18	18	18	18	18	18	18	18	18	18	18	18	18	18	18	18

Updated to match(es) played on 27 May 2017. Source: Bundesliga
A = Away; H = Home; W = Win; D = Draw; L = Loss

==== Matches ====
27 August 2016 1	1. FC Köln	2–0	Darmstadt 98	Cologne
15:30 CEST (UTC+2)	Risse 11'; Maroh (yellow card) 19'; Modeste 61'; Bittencourt (yellow card) 69'; Zoller (yellow card) 90+1'	Report	Fedetskyi (yellow card) 27'; Holland (yellow card) 38'; Höhn (yellow card) 47'	Stadium: RheinEnergieSTADION; Attendance: 50,000; Referee: Patrick Ittrich

10 September 2016 2	Darmstadt 98	1–0	Eintracht Frankfurt	Darmstadt
15:30 CEST (UTC+2)	Gondorf (yellow card) 76'; Sirigu 90'	Report	Abraham (yellow card) 58'; Gaćinović (yellow card) 90+1'	Stadium: Jonathan-Heimes-Stadion am Böllenfalltor; Attendance: 17,000; Referee: Felix Zwayer

17 September 2016 3	Borussia Dortmund	6–0	Darmstadt 98	Dortmund
15:30 CEST (UTC+2)	Castro 7', 78'; Ramos 48'; Pulisic 54'; Rode 84'; Mor 88'	Report	Ben-Hatira (yellow card) 22'; Milošević (yellow card) 32'; Höhn (yellow card) 41'; Niemeyer (yellow card) 44' (yellow-red card) 57'; Jungwirth (yellow card) 50'	Stadium: SIGNAL IDUNA PARK; Attendance: 81,360; Referee: Benjamin Brand

20 September 2016 4	Darmstadt 98	1–1	1899 Hoffenheim	Darmstadt
20:00 CEST (UTC+2)	Jungwirth (yellow card) 77'; Oliynyk 90+2'	Report	Kramarić 46'; Vargas (yellow card) 83'	Stadium: Jonathan-Heimes-Stadion am Böllenfalltor; Attendance: 15,800; Referee: Frank Willenborg

24 September 2016 5	FC Augsburg	1–0	Darmstadt 98	Augsburg
15:30 CEST (UTC+2)	Ji (yellow card) 37'; Finnbogason 47'; Verhaegh (yellow card) 86'	Report	Niemeyer (yellow card) 31'; Guwara (yellow card) 41' (yellow-red card) 45+3'	Stadium: WWK ARENA; Attendance: 28,113; Referee: Guido Winkmann

1 October 2016 6	Darmstadt 98	2–2	Werder Bremen	Darmstadt
15:30 CEST (UTC+2)	Fedetskyi (yellow card) 12'; Čolak 19' (pen.), 73'; Sulu (yellow card) 38'	Report	Grillitsch (yellow card) 30'; Sané 51'; Gnabry 67'	Stadium: Jonathan-Heimes-Stadion am Böllenfalltor; Attendance: 17,000; Referee: Jochen Drees

16 October 2016 7	Mainz 05	2–1	Darmstadt 98	Mainz
15:30 CEST (UTC+2)	de Blasis 5'; Brosinski (yellow card) 38'; Mallı 56' (pen.); Bell (yellow card) 61'; Córdoba (yellow card) 90+3'	Report	Milošević (yellow card) 23'; Gondorf 90+2'	Stadium: OPEL ARENA; Attendance: 29,987; Referee: Felix Brych

22 October 2016 8	Darmstadt 98	3–1	VfL Wolfsburg	Darmstadt
15:30 CEST (UTC+2)	Ben-Hatira 25'; Kleinheisler 68'; Sirigu 76'	Report	Bruma (red card) 23'; Gómez 60'; Schäfer (yellow card) 67'; Arnold (yellow card) 79'	Stadium: Jonathan-Heimes-Stadion am Böllenfalltor; Attendance: 15,300; Referee: Markus Schmidt

29 October 2016 9	Darmstadt 98	0–2	RB Leipzig	Darmstadt
15:30 CEST (UTC+2)	Gondorf (yellow card) 3'; Schipplock (yellow card) 21'; Höhn (yellow card) 77'; Ben-Hatira (yellow card) 86'	Report	Poulsen (yellow card) 24'; Sabitzer 57', 81'; Compper (yellow card) 67'	Stadium: Jonathan-Heimes-Stadion am Böllenfalltor; Attendance: 16,400; Referee: Wolfgang Stark

5 November 2016 10	Bayer Leverkusen	3–2	Darmstadt 98	Leverkusen
15:30 CET (UTC+1)	Çalhanoğlu 32'; Brandt 56'; Aránguiz 69'	Report	Čolak 47'; Vrančić 85'; Guwara (yellow card) 90+1'	Stadium: BayArena; Attendance: 28,941; Referee: Harm Osmers

19 November 2016 11	Darmstadt 98	0–1	FC Ingolstadt	Darmstadt
15:30 CET (UTC+1)	Ben-Hatira (yellow card) 4'	Report	Suttner (yellow card) 35'; Roger (yellow card) 61'; Tisserand (yellow card) 66'; Hartmann 68'; Hadergjonaj (yellow card) 73'	Stadium: Jonathan-Heimes-Stadion am Böllenfalltor; Attendance: 15,000; Referee: Christian Dingert

27 November 2016 12	Schalke 04	3–1	Darmstadt 98	Gelsenkirchen
15:30 CET (UTC+1)	Kolašinac 26'; Choupo-Moting 60'; Schöpf 90'	Report	Heller 6'; Fedetskyi (yellow card) 39'; Sirigu (yellow card) 50'	Stadium: VELTINS-Arena; Attendance: 58,703; Referee: Frank Willenborg

4 December 2016 13	Darmstadt 98	0–2	Hamburger SV	Darmstadt
15:30 CET (UTC+1)	Sulu (yellow card) 39'; Rosenthal (yellow card) 88'	Report	Gregoritsch 30'; Djourou (yellow card) 43'; Müller (yellow card) 59'; Ostrzolek (yellow card) 83', (goal) 90'; Diekmeier (yellow card) 90+1'	Stadium: Jonathan-Heimes-Stadion am Böllenfalltor; Attendance: 17,400; Referee: Guido Winkmann

10 December 2016 14	SC Freiburg	1–0	Darmstadt 98	Freiburg im Breisgau
15:30 CET (UTC+1)	Schuster (yellow card) 10'; Stenzel (yellow card) 38'; Höfler (yellow card) 61'; Petersen 86' (pen.)	Report	Vrančić (yellow card) 23'; Schipplock (yellow card) 42'; Gondorf (yellow card) 84'; Esser (yellow card) 85'	Stadium: Schwarzwald-Stadion; Attendance: 24,000; Referee: Wolfgang Stark

18 December 2016 15	Darmstadt 98	0–1	Bayern Munich	Darmstadt
15:30 CET (UTC+1)	Rosenthal (yellow card) 43'	Report	Douglas Costa 71'; Hummels (yellow card) 75'; Alonso (yellow card) 75'	Stadium: Jonathan-Heimes-Stadion am Böllenfalltor; Attendance: 17,400; Referee: Bastian Dankert

21 December 2016 16	Hertha BSC	2–0	Darmstadt 98	Berlin
20:00 CET (UTC+1)	Plattenhardt (yellow card) 42', (goal) 53'; Kalou 66'	Report	Fedetskyi (yellow card) 65'; Sulu (yellow card) 71'; Niemeyer (yellow card) 90'	Stadium: Olympiastadion Berlin; Attendance: 31,912; Referee: Robert Hartmann

21 January 2017 17	Darmstadt 98	0–0	Borussia Mönchengladbach	Darmstadt
15:30 CET (UTC+1)	Niemeyer (yellow card) 90'	Report	Jantschke (yellow card) 59'	Stadium: Jonathan-Heimes-Stadion am Böllenfalltor; Attendance: 17,400; Referee: Marco Fritz

28 January 2017 18	Darmstadt 98	1–6	1. FC Köln	Darmstadt
15:30 CET (UTC+1)	Milošević (yellow card) 30'; Boyd (yellow card) 55'; Sam 66' (pen.)	Report	Modeste (yellow card) 29', (goal) 42'; Sulu 32' (o.g.); Osako 36', 72'; Clemens (yellow card) 41'; Rudņevs (yellow card) 65', (goal) 89'; Höger (yellow card) 66'; Jojić 85'	Stadium: Jonathan-Heimes-Stadion am Böllenfalltor; Attendance: 17,400; Referee: Robert Kampka

5 February 2017 19	Eintracht Frankfurt	2–0	Darmstadt 98	Frankfurt
17:30 CET (UTC+1)	Hasebe 74' (pen.); Gaćinović (yellow card) 82'; Rebić 83'; Barkok (yellow card) 89'	Report	Heller (yellow card) 27'; Niemeyer (yellow card) 36'; Milošević (yellow card) 73'; Sulu (yellow card) 78'	Stadium: Commerzbank-Arena; Attendance: 51,000; Referee: Manuel Gräfe

11 February 2017 20	Darmstadt 98	2–1	Borussia Dortmund	Darmstadt
15:30 CET (UTC+1)	Boyd 21'; Čolak 67'; Esser (yellow card) 75'; Sulu (yellow card) 77'	Report	Guerreiro 44'; Aubameyang (yellow card) 73'; Burnić (yellow card) 79'	Stadium: Jonathan-Heimes-Stadion am Böllenfalltor; Attendance: 17,400; Referee: Wolfgang Stark

18 February 2017 21	1899 Hoffenheim	2–0	Darmstadt 98	Sinsheim
15:30 CET (UTC+1)	Demirbay (yellow card) 22'; Kramarić 64', 90+3' (pen.); Bičakčić (yellow card) 75'; Rudy (yellow card) 78'	Report	Sam (yellow card) 76'; Sirigu (yellow card) 80'; Niemeyer (yellow card) 86'; Altıntop (yellow card) 90+2'	Stadium: WIRSOL Rhein-Neckar-Arena; Attendance: 29,013; Referee: Felix Brych

25 February 2017 22	Darmstadt 98	1–2	FC Augsburg	Darmstadt
15:30 CET (UTC+1)	Heller 47', (yellow card) 88'	Report	Verhaegh 55' (pen.); Bobadilla 85'	Stadium: Jonathan-Heimes-Stadion am Böllenfalltor; Attendance: 16,200; Referee: Jochen Drees

4 March 2017 23	Werder Bremen	2–0	Darmstadt 98	Bremen
15:30 CET (UTC+1)	Kruse 75' (pen.), 90+2'; M. Eggestein (yellow card) 85'	Report	Altıntop (yellow card) 69'	Stadium: Weser-Stadion; Attendance: 41,000; Referee: Guido Winkmann

11 March 2017 24	Darmstadt 98	2–1	Mainz 05	Darmstadt
15:30 CET (UTC+1)	Sulu 5'; Sam 12' (pen.); Vrančić (yellow card) 53' (yellow-red card) 59'; Gondorf (yellow card) 77'; Platte (yellow card) 90+1'; Niemeyer (yellow card) 90+1'	Report	Ramalho (yellow card) 18'; Bell (yellow card) 45' (yellow-red card) 89'; Quaison 45+3'; Córdoba (yellow card) 66'	Stadium: Jonathan-Heimes-Stadion am Böllenfalltor; Attendance: 17,400; Referee: Frank Willenborg

18 March 2017 25	VfL Wolfsburg	1–0	Darmstadt 98	Wolfsburg
15:30 CET (UTC+1)	Gómez 45+1', (yellow card) 62'; Knoche (yellow card) 62'	Report	Gondorf (yellow card) 58'; Sulu (yellow card) 68'; Banggaard (yellow card) 74'	Stadium: VOLKSWAGEN ARENA; Attendance: 28,104; Referee: Felix Brych

1 April 2017 26	RB Leipzig	4–0	Darmstadt 98	Leipzig
15:30 CEST (UTC+2)	Keïta 12', 80'; Burke (yellow card) 42'; Forsberg 67'; Orban 79'	Report	Schipplock (yellow card) 57'; Sirigu (yellow card) 62' (yellow-red card) 72'; Kamavuaka (yellow card) 83'	Stadium: Red Bull Arena; Attendance: 39,394; Referee: Bastian Dankert

5 April 2017 27	Darmstadt 98	0–2	Bayer Leverkusen	Darmstadt
20:00 CEST (UTC+2)		Report	Brandt 15'; Jedvaj (yellow card) 36'; Toprak (yellow card) 39'; Volland 56'	Stadium: Jonathan-Heimes-Stadion am Böllenfalltor; Attendance: 16,200; Referee: Benjamin Brand

9 April 2017 28	FC Ingolstadt	3–2	Darmstadt 98	Ingolstadt
17:30 CEST (UTC+2)	Groß 19'; Cohen 68'; Suttner 72', (yellow card) 75'; Brégerie (red card) 87'	Report	Vrančić 33', 39' (pen.); Čolak (yellow card) 64' (yellow-red card) 87'	Stadium: Audi Sportpark; Attendance: 14,081; Referee: Manuel Gräfe

16 April 2017 29	Darmstadt 98	2–1	Schalke 04	Darmstadt
17:30 CEST (UTC+2)	Vrančić 11'; Sirigu (yellow card) 39'; Altıntop (yellow card) 54'; Holland (yellow card) 63'; Banggaard (yellow card) 83'; Esser (yellow card) 89'; Gondorf 90+3'	Report	Kehrer (yellow card) 69' (red card) 81'; Meyer (yellow card) 72'; Coke 75'	Stadium: Jonathan-Heimes-Stadion am Böllenfalltor; Attendance: 17,400; Referee: Patrick Ittrich

22 April 2017 30	Hamburger SV	1–2	Darmstadt 98	Hamburg
15:30 CEST (UTC+2)	Kostić (yellow card) 13'; Hunt (yellow card) 57'; Mavraj (yellow card) 81'; Holland 90+3' (o.g.)	Report	Sulu 51'; Platte 53'; Kamavuaka (yellow card) 57'; Banggaard (yellow card) 75'	Stadium: Volksparkstadion; Attendance: 56,132; Referee: Sascha Stegemann

29 April 2017 31	Darmstadt 98	3–0	SC Freiburg	Darmstadt
15:30 CEST (UTC+2)	Platte 22'; Gondorf (yellow card) 25', (goal) 45'; Banggaard (yellow card) 42'; Schipplock 65'	Report		Stadium: Jonathan-Heimes-Stadion am Böllenfalltor; Attendance: 17,400; Referee: Benjamin Cortus

6 May 2017 32	Bayern Munich	1–0	Darmstadt 98	Munich
15:30 CEST (UTC+2)	Bernat 18'; Rafinha (yellow card) 86'	Report	Sirigu (yellow card) 61'	Stadium: Allianz Arena; Attendance: 75,000; Referee: Guido Winkmann

13 May 2017 33	Darmstadt 98	0–2	Hertha BSC	Darmstadt
15:30 CEST (UTC+2)	Sulu (yellow card) 67'; Rosenthal (yellow card) 84'; Gondorf (yellow card) 86'	Report	Kalou 14'; Torunarigha 28'	Stadium: Jonathan-Heimes-Stadion am Böllenfalltor; Attendance: 17,400; Referee: Benjamin Brand

20 May 2017 34	Borussia Mönchengladbach	2–2	Darmstadt 98	Mönchengladbach
15:30 CEST (UTC+2)	Kramer (yellow card) 12'; Hazard 50'; Raffael 65'	Report	Schipplock 62'; Heller 90'	Stadium: BORUSSIA-PARK; Attendance: 54,014; Referee: Wolfgang Stark

=== DFB-Pokal ===
21 August 2016 First round	Bremer SV	0–7	Darmstadt 98	Bremen
15:30 CEST (UTC+2)	Aziri (yellow card) 16'; Laabs (yellow card) 72'	Report	Čolak 18', 45+2', 58'; Kmieć 22' (o.g.); Heller 40'; Gondorf 56'; Schipplock 87'	Stadium: Stadion am Panzenberg; Attendance: 1,993; Referee: Lasse Koslowski

26 October 2016 Second round	Astoria Walldorf	1–0	Darmstadt 98	Walldorf
18:30 CEST (UTC+2)	Hillenbrand 32'	Report		Stadium: FC-Astoria Stadion; Attendance: 4,000; Referee: Bibiana Steinhaus

== Statistics ==
=== Appearances and goals ===
No.	Pos	Nat	Player	Total		Bundesliga		DFB-Pokal	
No.	Pos	Nat	Player	Apps	Goals	Apps	Goals	Apps	Goals
Goalkeepers
1	GK	(Portugal) POR	Daniel Heuer Fernandes	7	0	6+1	0	0	0
24	GK	(Ukraine) UKR	Ihor Berezovskyi	0	0	0	0	0	0
31	GK	(Germany) GER	Michael Esser	30	0	28	0	2	0
Defenders
2	DF	(Germany) GER	Leon Guwara	17	0	11+6	0	0	0
3	DF	(Sweden) SWE	Alexander Milošević	20	0	18	0	1+1	0
4	DF	(Turkey) TUR	Aytaç Sulu	29	2	27	2	2	0
5	DF	(Germany) GER	Benjamin Gorka	1	0	0+1	0	0	0
7	DF	(Ukraine) UKR	Artem Fedetskyi	17	0	13+3	0	1	0
13	DF	(Germany) GER	Markus Steinhöfer	7	0	3+4	0	0	0
17	DF	(Germany) GER	Sandro Sirigu	31	2	17+13	2	1	0
21	DF	(Germany) GER	Immanuel Höhn	14	0	12	0	2	0
26	DF	(Denmark) DEN	Patrick Banggaard	9	0	9	0	0	0
27	DF	(Germany) GER	Can Luca Aydogan	0	0	0	0	0	0
32	DF	(Germany) GER	Fabian Holland	28	0	25+1	0	2	0
37	DF	(Germany) GER	Liam Fisch	0	0	0	0	0	0
Midfielders
6	MF	(Bosnia and Herzegovina) BIH	Mario Vrančić	25	4	18+5	4	1+1	0
8	MF	(Germany) GER	Jérôme Gondorf	31	4	29	3	2	1
10	MF	(Germany) GER	Jan Rosenthal	19	0	10+9	0	0	0
18	MF	(Germany) GER	Peter Niemeyer	17	0	13+2	0	2	0
20	MF	(Germany) GER	Marcel Heller	34	4	31+1	3	2	1
34	MF	(Turkey) TUR	Hamit Altıntop	16	0	15+1	0	0	0
35	MF	(Germany) GER	Johannes Wolff	0	0	0	0	0	0
36	MF	(Democratic Republic of the Congo) COD	Wilson Kamavuaka	8	0	6+2	0	0	0
38	MF	(Germany) GER	Daniel Thur	0	0	0	0	0	0
Forwards
9	FW	(Germany) GER	Dominik Stroh-Engel	5	0	0+4	0	0+1	0
14	FW	(Slovenia) SVN	Roman Bezjak	12	0	7+4	0	0+1	0
15	FW	(United States) USA	Terrence Boyd	7	1	5+2	1	0	0
16	FW	(Croatia) CRO	Antonio Čolak	24	7	12+10	4	2	3
19	FW	(Germany) GER	Felix Platte	9	2	6+3	2	0	0
22	FW	(Ukraine) UKR	Denys Oliynyk	4	1	0+4	1	0	0
33	FW	(Germany) GER	Sidney Sam	13	2	11+2	2	0	0
39	FW	(Germany) GER	Sven Schipplock	25	3	12+11	2	1+1	1
40	FW	(Germany) GER	Silas Zehnder	1	0	0+1	0	0	0
Players transferred out during the season
11	FW	(Nigeria) NGA	Victor Obinna	3	0	0+2	0	1	0
23	MF	(Germany) GER	Florian Jungwirth	16	0	12+4	0	0	0
28	MF	(Tunisia) TUN	Änis Ben-Hatira	11	1	8+3	1	0	0
30	MF	(Hungary) HUN	László Kleinheisler	13	1	10+2	1	0+1	0

Last updated: 20 May 2017
Source: Competitions

=== Goalscorers ===
Rank	No.	Pos	Nat	Name	Bundesliga	DFB-Pokal	Total
1	16	FW	(Croatia)	Antonio Čolak	4	3	7
2	6	MF	(Bosnia and Herzegovina)	Mario Vrančić	4	0	4
2	8	MF	(Germany)	Jérôme Gondorf	3	1	4
2	20	MF	(Germany)	Marcel Heller	3	1	4
5	39	FW	(Germany)	Sven Schipplock	2	1	3
6	4	DF	(Turkey)	Aytaç Sulu	2	0	2
6	17	DF	(Germany)	Sandro Sirigu	2	0	2
6	19	FW	(Germany)	Felix Platte	2	0	2
6	33	FW	(Germany)	Sidney Sam	2	0	2
10	15	FW	(United States)	Terrence Boyd	1	0	1
10	22	FW	(Ukraine)	Denys Oliynyk	1	0	1
10	28	MF	(Tunisia)	Änis Ben-Hatira	1	0	1
10	30	MF	(Hungary)	László Kleinheisler	1	0	1
Own goal					0	1	1
Totals					28	7	35

Last updated: 20 May 2017

=== Clean sheets ===
Rank	No.	Pos	Nat	Name	Bundesliga	DFB-Pokal	Total
1	31	GK	(Germany)	Michael Esser	3	1	4
Totals					3	1	4

Last updated: 29 April 2017

=== Disciplinary record ===
No.	Pos	Nat	Player	Bundesliga			DFB-Pokal			Total		
No.	Pos	Nat	Player	Booked	(yellow card) (yellow-red card)	Sent off (straight red)	Booked	(yellow card) (yellow-red card)	Sent off (straight red)	Booked	(yellow card) (yellow-red card)	Sent off (straight red)
2	DF	(Germany)	Leon Guwara	1	1	0	0	0	0	1	1	0
3	DF	(Sweden)	Alexander Milošević	4	0	0	0	0	0	4	0	0
4	DF	(Turkey)	Aytaç Sulu	7	0	0	0	0	0	7	0	0
6	MF	(Bosnia and Herzegovina)	Mario Vrančić	1	1	0	0	0	0	1	1	0
7	DF	(Ukraine)	Artem Fedetskyi	4	0	0	0	0	0	4	0	0
8	MF	(Germany)	Jérôme Gondorf	7	0	0	0	0	0	7	0	0
10	MF	(Germany)	Jan Rosenthal	3	0	0	0	0	0	3	0	0
15	FW	(United States)	Terrence Boyd	1	0	0	0	0	0	1	0	0
16	FW	(Croatia)	Antonio Čolak	0	1	0	0	0	0	0	1	0
17	DF	(Germany)	Sandro Sirigu	4	1	0	0	0	0	4	1	0
18	MF	(Germany)	Peter Niemeyer	6	1	0	0	0	0	6	1	0
19	FW	(Germany)	Felix Platte	1	0	0	0	0	0	1	0	0
20	MF	(Germany)	Marcel Heller	2	0	0	0	0	0	2	0	0
21	DF	(Germany)	Immanuel Höhn	3	0	0	0	0	0	3	0	0
23	MF	(Germany)	Florian Jungwirth	2	0	0	0	0	0	2	0	0
26	DF	(Denmark)	Patrick Banggaard	4	0	0	0	0	0	4	0	0
28	DF	(Tunisia)	Änis Ben-Hatira	3	0	0	0	0	0	3	0	0
31	GK	(Germany)	Michael Esser	3	0	0	0	0	0	3	0	0
32	DF	(Germany)	Fabian Holland	2	0	0	0	0	0	2	0	0
33	FW	(Germany)	Sidney Sam	1	0	0	0	0	0	1	0	0
34	MF	(Turkey)	Hamit Altıntop	3	0	0	0	0	0	3	0	0
36	MF	(Democratic Republic of the Congo)	Wilson Kamavuaka	2	0	0	0	0	0	2	0	0
39	FW	(Germany)	Sven Schipplock	3	0	0	0	0	0	3	0	0
Totals				64	5	0	0	0	0	64	5	0

Last updated: 13 May 2017
