= List of German football transfers summer 2016 =

This is a list of German football transfers in the summer transfer window 2016 by club. Only transfers of the Bundesliga, and 2. Bundesliga are included.

== Bundesliga ==
Note: Flags indicate national team as has been defined under FIFA eligibility rules. Players may hold more than one non-FIFA nationality.

=== FC Bayern Munich ===
In:

No.	Pos.	Nation	Player
5	DF	GER	Mats Hummels (from Borussia Dortmund)
30	MF	GER	Niklas Dorsch (from FC Bayern Munich II)
35	MF	POR	Renato Sanches (from S.L. Benfica)
40	MF	GER	Fabian Benko (from FC Bayern Munich II)

Out:

No.	Pos.	Nation	Player
4	DF	GER	Serdar Tasci (loan return to FC Spartak Moscow)
5	DF	MAR	Medhi Benatia (on loan to Juventus FC)
19	MF	GER	Mario Götze (to Borussia Dortmund)
20	MF	GER	Sebastian Rode (to Borussia Dortmund)
33	GK	AUT	Ivan Lučić (to Bristol City F.C.)
--	MF	DEN	Pierre-Emile Højbjerg (to Southampton F.C., previously on loan at FC Schalke 04)

=== Borussia Dortmund ===
In:

No.	Pos.	Nation	Player
5	DF	ESP	Marc Bartra (from FC Barcelona)
7	FW	FRA	Ousmane Dembélé (from Stade Rennais F.C.)
9	MF	TUR	Emre Mor (from FC Nordsjælland)
10	MF	GER	Mario Götze (from FC Bayern Munich)
13	DF	POR	Raphaël Guerreiro (from FC Lorient)
18	MF	GER	Sebastian Rode (from FC Bayern Munich)
21	MF	GER	André Schürrle (from VfL Wolfsburg)
24	MF	ESP	Mikel Merino (from CA Osasuna)
32	MF	GER	Dženis Burnić (from Borussia Dortmund U19)
--	MF	POL	Jakub Błaszczykowski (loan return from ACF Fiorentina)

Out:

No.	Pos.	Nation	Player
8	MF	GER	İlkay Gündoğan (to Manchester City F.C.)
10	MF	ARM	Henrikh Mkhitaryan (to Manchester United F.C.)
14	MF	GER	Moritz Leitner (to S.S. Lazio)
15	DF	GER	Mats Hummels (to FC Bayern Munich)
16	MF	POL	Jakub Błaszczykowski (to VfL Wolfsburg, previously on loan at ACF Fiorentina)
--	MF	GER	Jannik Bandowski (to VfL Bochum, previously on loan at TSV 1860 Munich)

=== Bayer 04 Leverkusen ===
In:

No.	Pos.	Nation	Player
6	DF	AUT	Aleksandar Dragović (from FC Dynamo Kyiv)
15	MF	AUT	Julian Baumgartlinger (from 1. FSV Mainz 05)
17	FW	FIN	Joel Pohjanpalo (loan return from Fortuna Düsseldorf)
22	DF	GER	Joel Abu Hanna (from Bayer 04 Leverkusen U19)
23	DF	GER	Danny da Costa (from FC Ingolstadt 04)
28	GK	AUT	Ramazan Özcan (from FC Ingolstadt 04)
29	MF	GER	Kai Havertz (from Bayer 04 Leverkusen U19)
30	MF	GER	Sam Schreck (from FC St. Pauli U17)
31	FW	GER	Kevin Volland (from TSG 1899 Hoffenheim)
36	GK	GER	Niklas Lomb (loan return from SC Preußen Münster)
--	FW	KOR	Ryu Seung-woo (loan return from Arminia Bielefeld)
--	FW	CRO	Patrik Džalto (from Bayer 04 Leverkusen U19)
--	FW	LVA	Andrejs Cigaņiks (from Bayer 04 Leverkusen U19)
--	MF	GER	Jonas Meffert (from Karlsruher SC)
--	MF	GER	Levin Öztunalı (loan return from Werder Bremen)
--	DF	GER	Malcolm Cacutalua (loan return from VfL Bochum)

Out:

No.	Pos.	Nation	Player
2	DF	BRA	André Ramalho (on loan to 1. FSV Mainz 05)
5	DF	GRE	Kyriakos Papadopoulos (on loan to RB Leipzig)
6	MF	GER	Levin Öztunalı (to 1. FSV Mainz 05)
17	DF	POL	Sebastian Boenisch (released)
22	GK	USA	David Yelldell (to SG Sonnenhof Großaspach)
23	MF	GER	Christoph Kramer (to Borussia Mönchengladbach)
24	FW	KOR	Ryu Seung-woo (on loan to Ferencvárosi TC)
25	GK	CRO	Dario Krešić (to AC Omonia)
32	DF	GER	Malcolm Cacutalua (to Arminia Bielefeld)
34	DF	GER	Robin Becker (on loan to 1. FC Heidenheim)
37	MF	GER	Marlon Frey (on loan to 1. FC Kaiserslautern)
--	MF	GER	Jonas Meffert (to SC Freiburg)
--	FW	CRO	Marc Brašnić (on loan to SC Fortuna Köln, previously on loan at SC Paderborn 07)
--	MF	GER	Maximilian Wagener (to SG Wattenscheid 09, previously on loan at 1. FSV Mainz 05 II)
--	FW	CRO	Patrik Džalto (on loan to SSV Jahn Regensburg)
--	FW	LVA	Andrejs Cigaņiks (on loan to FC Viktoria Köln)

=== Borussia Mönchengladbach ===
In:

No.	Pos.	Nation	Player
4	DF	DEN	Jannik Vestergaard (from SV Werder Bremen)
5	DF	GER	Tobias Strobl (from 1899 Hoffenheim)
6	MF	GER	Christoph Kramer (from Bayer 04 Leverkusen)
9	FW	SUI	Josip Drmić (loan return from Hamburger SV)
20	MF	SUI	Djibril Sow (from Borussia Mönchengladbach II)
22	MF	SVK	László Bénes (from MŠK Žilina)
26	MF	GER	Tsiy-William Ndenge (from Borussia Mönchengladbach II)
29	DF	FRA	Mamadou Doucouré (from Paris Saint-Germain CFA)

Out:

No.	Pos.	Nation	Player
4	DF	NED	Roel Brouwers (to Roda JC Kerkrade)
5	DF	AUT	Martin Hinteregger (loan return to RB Salzburg)
6	MF	NOR	Håvard Nordtveit (to West Ham United F.C.)
31	FW	SWE	Branimir Hrgota (to Eintracht Frankfurt)
34	MF	SUI	Granit Xhaka (to Arsenal F.C.)
36	FW	GER	Marlon Ritter (to Fortuna Düsseldorf)
39	DF	AUT	Martin Stranzl (retired)
--	MF	GER	Nico Brandenburger (to Borussia Mönchengladbach II, previously on loan at FC Luzern)
--	GK	GER	Janis Blaswich (to Borussia Mönchengladbach II, previously on loan at SG Dynamo Dresden)

=== FC Schalke 04 ===
In:

No.	Pos.	Nation	Player
10	MF	ALG	Nabil Bentaleb (on loan from Tottenham Hotspur F.C.)
11	MF	UKR	Yevhen Konoplyanka (on loan from Sevilla FC)
14	DF	GHA	Baba Rahman (on loan from Chelsea F.C.)
16	FW	GER	Fabian Reese (from FC Schalke 04 U19)
17	MF	FRA	Benjamin Stambouli (from Paris Saint-Germain F.C.)
23	DF	ESP	Coke (from Sevilla FC)
28	DF	GER	Joshua Bitter (from FC Schalke 04 U19)
29	DF	BRA	Naldo (from VfL Wolfsburg)
30	GK	GER	Timon Wellenreuther (loan return from RCD Mallorca)
32	MF	GHA	Bernard Tekpetey (from FC Schalke 04 II)
33	FW	GER	Donis Avdijaj (loan return from Sturm Graz)
36	FW	SUI	Breel Embolo (from FC Basel)
40	DF	GER	Phil Neumann (from FC Schalke 04 U19)
--	FW	GER	Robert Leipertz (from 1. FC Heidenheim)
--	DF	TUR	Kaan Ayhan (loan return from Eintracht Frankfurt)

Out:

No.	Pos.	Nation	Player
2	DF	GER	Marvin Friedrich (to FC Augsburg)
11	MF	MAR	Younès Belhanda (loan return to FC Dynamo Kyiv)
12	MF	GER	Marco Höger (to 1. FC Köln)
19	MF	GER	Leroy Sané (to Manchester City F.C.)
23	MF	DEN	Pierre-Emile Højbjerg (loan return to FC Bayern Munich)
24	DF	TUR	Kaan Ayhan (to Fortuna Düsseldorf)
30	GK	AUT	Michael Gspurning (to 1. FC Union Berlin)
32	DF	CMR	Joël Matip (to Liverpool F.C.)
33	MF	RUS	Roman Neustädter (to Fenerbahçe S.K.)
--	MF	GER	Christian Clemens (to 1. FSV Mainz 05, previously on loan)
--	FW	GER	Robert Leipertz (to FC Ingolstadt 04)

=== 1. FSV Mainz 05 ===
In:

No.	Pos.	Nation	Player
1	GK	DEN	Jonas Lössl (from En Avant de Guingamp)
5	MF	ESP	José Rodríguez (from Galatasaray S.K.)
8	MF	GER	Levin Öztunalı (from Bayer 04 Leverkusen)
15	FW	COL	Jhon Cordoba (from Granada CF, previously on loan)
22	DF	BRA	André Ramalho (on loan from Bayer 04 Leverkusen)
25	DF	FRA	Jean-Philippe Gbamin (from RC Lens)
27	MF	GER	Christian Clemens (from FC Schalke 04, previously on loan)
30	MF	KOS	Besar Halimi (loan return from FSV Frankfurt)
38	MF	GER	Gerrit Holtmann (from Eintracht Braunschweig)

Out:

No.	Pos.	Nation	Player
1	GK	GER	Loris Karius (to Liverpool F.C.)
5	DF	POR	Henrique Sereno (released)
7	DF	SWE	Pierre Bengtsson (on loan to SC Bastia)
8	MF	GER	Christoph Moritz (to 1. FC Kaiserslautern)
14	MF	AUT	Julian Baumgartlinger (to Bayer 04 Leverkusen)
19	MF	COL	Elkin Soto (to Once Caldas)
30	MF	GER	Patrick Pflücke (to 1. FSV Mainz 05 II)
--	FW	GER	Dani Schahin (to Roda JC Kerkrade, previously on loan at FSV Frankfurt)
--	MF	DEN	Niki Zimling (to 1. FSV Mainz 05 II, previously on loan at FSV Frankfurt)
--	MF	GER	Maximilian Beister (to 1. FSV Mainz 05 II, previously on loan at TSV 1860 Munich)

=== Hertha BSC ===
In:

No.	Pos.	Nation	Player
7	MF	GER	Alexander Esswein (from FC Augsburg)
10	MF	SVK	Ondrej Duda (from Legia Warsaw)
19	FW	BIH	Vedad Ibišević (from VfB Stuttgart, previously on loan)
20	MF	BRA	Allan (on loan from Liverpool F.C.)

Out:

No.	Pos.	Nation	Player
12	MF	BRA	Ronny (released)
17	MF	TUR	Tolga Ciğerci (to Galatasaray S.K.)
23	MF	GER	Johannes van den Bergh (to Getafe CF)
27	MF	NED	Roy Beerens (to Reading F.C.)
30	GK	GER	Sascha Burchert (to SpVgg Greuther Fürth)
32	GK	GER	Shawn Kauter (to Hertha BSC II)
--	GK	GER	Marius Gersbeck (on loan to VfL Osnabrück, previously on loan at Chemnitzer FC)
--	MF	JPN	Hajime Hosogai (to VfB Stuttgart, previously on loan at Bursaspor)

=== VfL Wolfsburg ===
In:

No.	Pos.	Nation	Player
2	DF	GER	Philipp Wollscheid (on loan from Stoke City F.C.)
5	DF	NED	Jeffrey Bruma (from PSV Eindhoven)
11	MF	GER	Daniel Didavi (from VfB Stuttgart)
13	MF	GER	Yannick Gerhardt (from 1. FC Köln)
14	MF	POL	Jakub Błaszczykowski (from Borussia Dortmund)
17	FW	ESP	Borja Mayoral (on loan from Real Madrid C.F.)
21	DF	GER	Jannes Horn (from VfL Wolfsburg U19)
23	MF	FRA	Joshua Guilavogui (from Atlético Madrid, previously on loan)
25	FW	CRO	Josip Brekalo (from Dinamo Zagreb)
29	MF	GER	Amara Condé (from VfL Wolfsburg U19)
33	FW	GER	Mario Gómez (from ACF Fiorentina)
35	MF	GER	Anton Donkor (from VfL Wolfsburg U19)
36	GK	GER	Phillip Menzel (from VfL Wolfsburg U19)
40	DF	GER	Robin Ziegele (from VfL Wolfsburg U19)

Out:

No.	Pos.	Nation	Player
3	FW	DEN	Nicklas Bendtner (released)
11	FW	GER	Max Kruse (to SV Werder Bremen)
12	FW	NED	Bas Dost (to Sporting Clube de Portugal)
17	MF	GER	André Schürrle (to Borussia Dortmund)
18	DF	BRA	Dante (to OGC Nice)
25	DF	BRA	Naldo (to FC Schalke 04)
26	DF	BRA	Felipe (to G.D. Chaves)
32	FW	GER	Leandro Putaro (on loan to Arminia Bielefeld)
33	FW	GER	Sebastian Stolze (to VfL Wolfsburg II)
37	DF	GER	Moritz Sprenger (on loan to 1. FC Magdeburg)
--	GK	GER	Patrick Drewes (on loan to Preussen Münster, previously on loan at FC Wil 1900)
--	FW	POL	Oskar Zawada (to VfL Wolfsburg II, previously on loan at FC Twente)

=== 1. FC Köln ===
In:

No.	Pos.	Nation	Player
6	MF	GER	Marco Höger (from FC Schalke 04)
9	FW	LVA	Artjoms Rudņevs (from Hamburger SV)
19	FW	FRA	Serhou Guirassy (from Lille OSC)
20	MF	GER	Salih Özcan (from 1. FC Köln II)
30	MF	GER	Marcel Hartel (from 1. FC Köln II)
34	MF	GER	Konstantin Rausch (from SV Darmstadt 98)
35	GK	GER	Sven Müller (from 1. FC Köln II)

Out:

No.	Pos.	Nation	Player
6	MF	GER	Kevin Vogt (to 1899 Hoffenheim)
15	FW	AUT	Philipp Hosiner (loan return to Stade Rennais F.C.)
29	MF	SVK	Dušan Švento (to SK Slavia Prague)
31	MF	GER	Yannick Gerhardt (to VfL Wolfsburg)
37	GK	GER	Daniel Mesenhöler (to 1. FC Union Berlin)
--	DF	BRA	Bruno Nascimento (to AC Omonia, previously on loan at C.D. Tondela)

=== Hamburger SV ===
In:

No.	Pos.	Nation	Player
6	DF	BRA	Douglas Santos (from Clube Atlético Mineiro)
7	FW	USA	Bobby Wood (from 1. FC Union Berlin)
15	FW	GER	Luca Waldschmidt (from Eintracht Frankfurt)
17	MF	SRB	Filip Kostić (from VfB Stuttgart)
18	MF	GAM	Bakery Jatta (free agent)
23	FW	CRO	Alen Halilović (from FC Barcelona)
25	MF	GER	Mats Köhlert (from Hamburger SV U19)
31	GK	GER	Christian Mathenia (from SV Darmstadt 98)
32	MF	GER	Frank Ronstadt (from Hamburger SV U19)
--	MF	GER	Arianit Ferati (from VfB Stuttgart)
--	FW	GER	Kerem Demirbay (loan return from Fortuna Düsseldorf)
--	MF	HUN	Zoltán Stieber (loan return from 1. FC Nürnberg)

Out:

No.	Pos.	Nation	Player
1	GK	CZE	Jaroslav Drobný (to SV Werder Bremen)
6	FW	GER	Kerem Demirbay (to 1899 Hoffenheim)
7	MF	CRO	Ivo Iličević (to FC Anzhi Makhachkala)
9	FW	GER	Sven Schipplock (on loan to SV Darmstadt 98)
11	FW	CRO	Ivica Olić (to TSV 1860 Munich)
16	FW	LVA	Artjoms Rudņevs (to 1. FC Köln)
17	MF	HUN	Zoltán Stieber (to 1. FC Kaiserslautern)
18	FW	SUI	Josip Drmić (loan return to Borussia Mönchengladbach)
26	FW	GER	Philipp Müller (to SV Wehen Wiesbaden)
33	FW	TUR	Batuhan Altıntaş (on loan to Kasımpaşa S.K.)
40	MF	SRB	Gojko Kačar (to FC Augsburg)
--	MF	GER	Ville Matti Steinmann (to 1. FSV Mainz 05 II, previously on loan at Chemnitzer FC)
--	MF	TUN	Mohamed Gouaida (on loan to FC St. Gallen, previously on loan at Karlsruher SC)
--	MF	GER	Arianit Ferati (on loan to Fortuna Düsseldorf)

=== FC Ingolstadt 04 ===
In:

No.	Pos.	Nation	Player
3	MF	GER	Anthony Jung (on loan from RB Leipzig)
13	FW	GER	Robert Leipertz (from FC Schalke 04)
17	DF	GER	Hauke Wahl (from SC Paderborn 07)
21	MF	GER	Sonny Kittel (from Eintracht Frankfurt)
22	MF	GER	Nico Rinderknecht (from Eintracht Frankfurt)
24	GK	CRO	Fabijan Buntić (from VfB Stuttgart U19)
32	DF	COD	Marcel Tisserand (from AS Monaco FC)
33	DF	SUI	Florent Hadergjonaj (from BSC Young Boys)
35	GK	DEN	Martin Hansen (from ADO Den Haag)
--	MF	GER	Kerem Bülbül (from Hertha BSC II)

Out:

No.	Pos.	Nation	Player
1	GK	AUT	Ramazan Özcan (to Bayer 04 Leverkusen)
5	DF	GER	Benjamin Hübner (to 1899 Hoffenheim)
15	DF	BRA	Danilo (released)
20	DF	KAZ	Konstantin Engel (to FC Astana)
21	DF	GER	Danny da Costa (to Bayer 04 Leverkusen)
23	MF	GER	Robert Bauer (to SV Werder Bremen)
25	FW	GER	Elias Kachunga (on loan to Huddersfield Town A.F.C.)
--	MF	GER	Kerem Bülbül (on loan to FC Hansa Rostock)

=== FC Augsburg ===
In:

No.	Pos.	Nation	Player
1	GK	GER	Andreas Luthe (from VfL Bochum)
11	MF	FRA	Jonathan Schmid (from 1899 Hoffenheim)
15	DF	GER	Marvin Friedrich (from FC Schalke 04)
20	MF	SRB	Gojko Kačar (from Hamburger SV)
27	FW	ISL	Alfreð Finnbogason (from Real Sociedad, previously on loan)
28	DF	AUT	Georg Teigl (from RB Leipzig)
36	DF	AUT	Martin Hinteregger (from FC Red Bull Salzburg)
39	MF	JPN	Takashi Usami (from Gamba Osaka)
--	FW	SVN	Tim Matavž (loan return from Genoa C.F.C.)

Out:

No.	Pos.	Nation	Player
1	GK	AUT	Alex Manninger (to Liverpool F.C.)
5	DF	EST	Ragnar Klavan (to Liverpool F.C.)
9	FW	GER	Shawn Parker (on loan to 1. FC Nürnberg)
11	MF	GER	Alexander Esswein (to Hertha BSC)
13	MF	GER	Tobias Werner (to VfB Stuttgart)
15	MF	GER	Piotr Trochowski (released)
17	FW	SUI	Albian Ajeti (on loan to FC St. Gallen)
20	DF	KOR	Hong Jeong-ho (to Jiangsu Suning F.C.)
23	FW	SVN	Tim Matavž (on loan to 1. FC Nürnberg)
28	GK	GER	Yannik Oettl (released)
29	MF	GER	Erik Thommy (on loan to SSV Jahn Regensburg)
39	DF	GER	Maik Uhde (to TSV Schwabmünchen)
--	FW	SRB	Nikola Đurđić (to FK Partizan, previously on loan at Fortuna Düsseldorf)
--	FW	GER	Sascha Mölders (to TSV 1860 Munich, previously on loan)

=== Werder Bremen ===
In:

No.	Pos.	Nation	Player
3	DF	ITA	Luca Caldirola (loan return from SV Darmstadt 98)
4	MF	GER	Robert Bauer (from FC Ingolstadt 04)
7	MF	AUT	Florian Kainz (from SK Rapid Wien)
10	FW	GER	Max Kruse (from VfL Wolfsburg)
11	FW	GER	Lennart Thy (from FC St. Pauli)
15	MF	BIH	Izet Hajrović (loan return from SD Eibar)
17	MF	GER	Justin Eilers (from Dynamo Dresden)
18	DF	FIN	Niklas Moisander (from U.C. Sampdoria)
21	DF	SEN	Fallou Diagne (from Stade Rennais F.C.)
24	FW	GER	Johannes Eggestein (from Werder Bremen U19)
25	MF	GRE	Athanasios Petsos (from SK Rapid Wien)
26	DF	SEN	Lamine Sané (from FC Girondins de Bordeaux)
29	MF	GER	Serge Gnabry (from Arsenal F.C.)
33	GK	CZE	Jaroslav Drobný (from Hamburger SV)
--	DF	GER	Leon Guwara (from Werder Bremen II)

Out:

No.	Pos.	Nation	Player
3	DF	SEN	Papy Djilobodji (loan return to Chelsea F.C.)
4	DF	ESP	Álex Gálvez (to SD Eibar)
6	MF	HUN	László Kleinheisler (on loan to SV Darmstadt 98)
7	DF	DEN	Jannik Vestergaard (to Borussia Mönchengladbach)
11	MF	GER	Levin Öztunalı (loan return to Bayer 04 Leverkusen)
15	DF	CRO	Mateo Pavlović (to Angers SCO)
17	MF	GER	Özkan Yıldırım (to Fortuna Düsseldorf)
18	GK	GER	Gerhard Tremmel (loan return to Swansea City A.F.C.)
19	DF	GER	Luca-Milan Zander (to Werder Bremen II)
21	FW	NGA	Anthony Ujah (to Liaoning Whowin F.C.)
25	DF	GER	Oliver Hüsing (to Ferencvárosi TC)
29	DF	GER	Leon Guwara (on loan to SV Darmstadt 98)
38	DF	GER	Marnon Busch (on loan to TSV 1860 Munich)
--	MF	GER	Felix Kroos (to 1. FC Union Berlin, previously on loan)

=== SV Darmstadt 98 ===
In:

No.	Pos.	Nation	Player
1	GK	POR	Daniel Heuer Fernandes (from SC Paderborn 07)
2	DF	GER	Leon Guwara (on loan from SV Werder Bremen)
3	DF	SWE	Alexander Milošević (on loan from Beşiktaş J.K.)
7	DF	UKR	Artem Fedetskyi (from FC Dnipro Dnipropetrovsk)
11	FW	NGA	Victor Obinna (free agent)
14	FW	SVN	Roman Bezjak (from HNK Rijeka)
16	FW	CRO	Antonio Čolak (on loan from TSG 1899 Hoffenheim)
21	DF	GER	Immanuel Höhn (from SC Freiburg)
22	MF	UKR	Denys Oliynyk (from SBV Vitesse)
24	GK	UKR	Ihor Berezovskyi (free agent)
28	MF	TUN	Änis Ben-Hatira (from Eintracht Frankfurt)
30	MF	HUN	László Kleinheisler (on loan from SV Werder Bremen)
31	GK	GER	Michael Esser (from SK Sturm Graz)
35	DF	GER	Johannes Wolff (from Darmstadt 98 U19)
36	DF	GER	Can Luka Aydogan (from Darmstadt 98 U19)
37	MF	GER	Liam Fisch (from Darmstadt 98 U19)
38	DF	GER	Daniel Thur (from Darmstadt 98 U19)
39	FW	GER	Sven Schipplock (on loan from Hamburger SV)

Out:

No.	Pos.	Nation	Player
1	GK	GER	Patrick Platins (retired)
3	DF	GER	Michael Stegmayer (retired)
7	FW	GER	Marco Sailer (to FSV Wacker 90 Nordhausen)
11	MF	GER	Tobias Kempe (to 1. FC Nürnberg)
13	DF	AUT	György Garics (released)
14	FW	GER	Sandro Wagner (to TSG 1899 Hoffenheim)
15	DF	CRC	Júnior Díaz (to Würzburger Kickers)
25	MF	GER	Yannick Stark (on loan to FSV Frankfurt)
27	MF	SVK	Milan Ivana (to SV Elversberg)
31	GK	GER	Christian Mathenia (to Hamburger SV)
33	DF	ITA	Luca Caldirola (loan return to SV Werder Bremen)
34	MF	GER	Konstantin Rausch (to 1. FC Köln)
35	DF	SRB	Slobodan Rajković (to U.S. Città di Palermo)
36	MF	GER	Jan Finger (to VfB Ginsheim)
37	MF	AFG	Ali Kazimi (to TS Ober-Roden)
38	MF	GER	Nick Volk (to Rot-Weiß Darmstadt)
39	DF	GER	Noel Wembacher (released)
40	GK	POL	Łukasz Załuska (to Wisła Kraków)

=== 1899 Hoffenheim ===
In:

No.	Pos.	Nation	Player
7	MF	GER	Lukas Rupp (from VfB Stuttgart)
13	FW	GER	Kerem Demirbay (from Hamburger SV)
14	FW	GER	Sandro Wagner (from SV Darmstadt 98)
21	DF	GER	Benjamin Hübner (from FC Ingolstadt 04)
22	MF	GER	Kevin Vogt (from 1. FC Köln)
23	FW	GER	Marco Terrazzino (from VfL Bochum)
27	FW	CRO	Andrej Kramarić (from Leicester City F.C., previously on loan)
28	FW	HUN	Ádám Szalai (loan return from Hannover 96)
32	MF	GER	Dennis Geiger (from 1899 Hoffenheim U19)
34	FW	TUR	Barış Atik (from 1899 Hoffenheim II)
36	GK	SUI	Gregor Kobel (from 1899 Hoffenheim U19)
--	GK	CRO	Marko Marić (loan return from Lechia Gdańsk)

Out:

No.	Pos.	Nation	Player
10	MF	FRA	Jonathan Schmid (to FC Augsburg)
12	DF	GER	Tobias Strobl (to Borussia Mönchengladbach)
13	GK	GER	Jens Grahl (to VfB Stuttgart)
14	FW	NOR	Tarik Elyounoussi (to Olympiacos F.C.)
22	FW	GER	Kevin Kurányi (released)
31	FW	GER	Kevin Volland (to Bayer 04 Leverkusen)
32	DF	GER	Benedikt Gimber (on loan to SV Sandhausen)
35	MF	USA	Russell Canouse (on loan to VfL Bochum)
38	MF	GER	Kai Herdling (retired)
40	FW	BRA	Joelinton (on loan to SK Rapid Wien)
--	FW	GER	Janik Haberer (to SC Freiburg, previously on loan at VfL Bochum)
--	FW	GER	Joshua Mees (to 1899 Hoffenheim II, previously on loan at SC Freiburg)
--	GK	GER	Marvin Schwäbe (on loan to Dynamo Dresden, previously on loan at VfL Osnabrück)
--	FW	CRO	Antonio Čolak (on loan to SV Darmstadt 98, previously on loan at 1. FC Kaiserslautern)
--	DF	AUT	Christoph Martschinko (to FK Austria Wien, previously on loan)
--	MF	BRA	Felipe Pires (on loan to FK Austria Wien, previously on loan at FSV Frankfurt)
--	MF	BRA	Matheus Biteco (loan return to Barra Futebol Clube)
--	FW	KOR	Park In-hyeok (on loan to FC Koper, previously on loan at FSV Frankfurt)

=== Eintracht Frankfurt ===
In:

No.	Pos.	Nation	Player
3	DF	URU	Guillermo Varela (on loan from Manchester United F.C.)
5	DF	ESP	Jesús Vallejo (on loan from Real Madrid C.F.)
7	MF	GER	Danny Blum (from 1. FC Nürnberg)
15	DF	JAM	Michael Hector (on loan from Chelsea F.C.)
17	MF	CRO	Ante Rebić (on loan from ACF Fiorentina)
30	FW	SUI	Shani Tarashaj (on loan from Everton F.C.)
31	FW	SWE	Branimir Hrgota (from Borussia Mönchengladbach)
32	MF	GER	Joel Gerezgiher (loan return from FSV Frankfurt)
33	DF	ISR	Taleb Tawatha (from Maccabi Haifa F.C.)
34	GK	GER	Leon Bätge (from Eintracht Frankfurt U19)
36	DF	GER	Furkan Zorba (from Eintracht Frankfurt U19)
39	MF	ESP	Omar Mascarell (from Real Madrid C.F.)

Out:

No.	Pos.	Nation	Player
3	DF	TUR	Kaan Ayhan (loan return to FC Schalke 04)
5	DF	PER	Carlos Zambrano (to FC Rubin Kazan)
7	MF	GER	Stefan Reinartz (retired)
15	DF	CIV	Constant Djakpa (released)
16	MF	GER	Stefan Aigner (to TSV 1860 Munich)
24	FW	GER	Luca Waldschmidt (to Hamburger SV)
27	MF	SRB	Aleksandar Ignjovski (to SC Freiburg)
28	MF	GER	Sonny Kittel (to FC Ingolstadt 04)
29	GK	AZE	Emil Balayev (released)
30	FW	NED	Luc Castaignos (to Sporting Clube de Portugal)
32	MF	TUN	Änis Ben-Hatira (to SV Darmstadt 98)
33	GK	GER	Yannick Zummack (to Sportfreunde Lotte)
35	MF	GER	Nico Rinderknecht (to FC Ingolstadt 04)

=== SC Freiburg ===
In:

No.	Pos.	Nation	Player
2	MF	SRB	Aleksandar Ignjovski (from Eintracht Frankfurt)
4	DF	TUR	Çağlar Söyüncü (from Altınordu F.K.)
5	DF	GER	Manuel Gulde (from Karlsruher SC)
11	MF	TUR	Onur Bulut (from VfL Bochum)
19	FW	GER	Janik Haberer (from 1899 Hoffenheim)
22	MF	GER	Jonas Meffert (from Bayer 04 Leverkusen)
24	DF	GER	Georg Niedermeier (from VfB Stuttgart)
29	MF	FRA	Charles-Elie Laprévotte (loan return from Preußen Münster)
44	GK	POL	Rafał Gikiewicz (from Eintracht Braunschweig)
--	GK	USA	Zack Steffen (from SC Freiburg II)
--	MF	GER	Sebastian Kerk (loan return from 1. FC Nürnberg)

Out:

No.	Pos.	Nation	Player
2	DF	NOR	Vegar Eggen Hedenstad (to FC St. Pauli)
4	DF	GER	Immanuel Höhn (to SV Darmstadt 98)
9	FW	GER	Tim Kleindienst (on loan to 1. FC Heidenheim)
9	MF	GER	Sebastian Kerk (on loan to 1. FC Kaiserslautern)
11	FW	GER	Joshua Mees (loan return to 1899 Hoffenheim)
19	MF	GER	Florian Kath (on loan to 1. FC Magdeburg)
24	DF	BIH	Mensur Mujdža (to 1. FC Kaiserslautern)
28	MF	GER	Marco Hingerl (to FC Bayern Munich II)
29	GK	GER	Konstantin Fuhry (to SV Elversberg)
29	GK	USA	Zack Steffen (to Columbus Crew SC)
33	MF	USA	Caleb Stanko (on loan to FC Vaduz)
44	MF	GER	Fabian Schleusener (on loan to FSV Frankfurt)
--	DF	SRB	Stefan Mitrović (to K.A.A. Gent, previously on loan)
--	DF	FRA	Christopher Jullien (to Toulouse FC, previously on loan at Dijon FCO)
--	FW	AUT	Philipp Zulechner (to SK Sturm Graz, previously on loan at BSC Young Boys)

=== RB Leipzig ===
In:

No.	Pos.	Nation	Player
3	MF	BRA	Bernardo (from FC Red Bull Salzburg)
5	DF	GRE	Kyriakos Papadopoulos (on loan from Bayer 04 Leverkusen)
8	MF	GUI	Naby Keïta (from FC Red Bull Salzburg)
11	FW	GER	Timo Werner (from VfB Stuttgart)
19	MF	SCO	Oliver Burke (from Nottingham Forest F.C.)
20	DF	GER	Benno Schmitz (from FC Red Bull Salzburg)
21	GK	GER	Marius Müller (from 1. FC Kaiserslautern)
26	MF	GER	Vitaly Janelt (from RB Leipzig U19)
35	MF	HUN	Zsolt Kalmár (loan return from FSV Frankfurt)
40	MF	GER	Idrissa Touré (from RB Leipzig U19)

Out:

No.	Pos.	Nation	Player
2	MF	GER	John-Patrick Strauß (to RB Leipzig II)
3	MF	GER	Anthony Jung (on loan to FC Ingolstadt)
5	DF	TUR	Atınç Nukan (on loan to Beşiktaş J.K.)
14	MF	BEL	Massimo Bruno (on loan to R.S.C. Anderlecht)
17	FW	GER	Nils Quaschner (on loan to VfL Bochum)
25	MF	AUT	Stefan Hierländer (to SK Sturm Graz)
39	DF	AUT	Georg Teigl (to FC Augsburg)
--	FW	ISR	Omer Damari (on loan to New York Red Bulls, previously on loan at FC Red Bull Salzburg)

== 2. Bundesliga ==
=== VfB Stuttgart ===
In:

No.	Pos.	Nation	Player
6	DF	GER	Jean Zimmer (from 1. FC Kaiserslautern)
7	MF	JPN	Hajime Hosogai (from Hertha BSC)
8	MF	SUI	Anto Grgić (from FC Zürich)
9	FW	GER	Simon Terodde (from VfL Bochum)
11	FW	JPN	Takuma Asano (on loan from Arsenal F.C.)
13	GK	GER	Jens Grahl (from TSG 1899 Hoffenheim)
15	MF	POR	Carlos Mané (on loan from Sporting Clube de Portugal)
17	MF	GER	Tobias Werner (from FC Augsburg)
18	MF	GHA	Hans Nunoo Sarpei (from Liberty Professionals F.C.)
21	DF	FRA	Benjamin Pavard (from Lille OSC)
35	DF	POL	Marcin Kamiński (from Lech Poznań)

Out:

No.	Pos.	Nation	Player
3	DF	GER	Daniel Schwaab (to PSV Eindhoven)
6	DF	GER	Georg Niedermeier (to SC Freiburg)
7	FW	AUT	Martin Harnik (to Hannover 96)
8	MF	GER	Lukas Rupp (to TSG 1899 Hoffenheim)
10	MF	GER	Daniel Didavi (to VfL Wolfsburg)
18	MF	SRB	Filip Kostić (to Hamburger SV)
19	FW	GER	Timo Werner (to RB Leipzig)
22	GK	POL	Przemysław Tytoń (to Deportivo de La Coruña)
26	MF	CIV	Serey Die (to FC Basel)
31	MF	GER	Arianit Ferati (to Hamburger SV)
39	FW	CZE	Jan Kliment (on loan to Brøndby IF)
42	FW	USA	Jerome Kiesewetter (to Fortuna Düsseldorf)
--	DF	GER	Antonio Rüdiger (to A.S. Roma, previously on loan)
--	FW	BIH	Vedad Ibišević (to Hertha BSC, previously on loan)
--	MF	NZL	Marco Rojas (to Melbourne Victory FC, previously on loan at FC Thun)

=== Hannover 96 ===
In:

No.	Pos.	Nation	Player
4	DF	NOR	Stefan Strandberg (on loan from FC Krasnodar)
6	MF	GER	Marvin Bakalorz (from SC Paderborn 07)
10	MF	GER	Sebastian Maier (from FC St. Pauli)
14	FW	AUT	Martin Harnik (from VfB Stuttgart)
19	DF	GER	Florian Hübner (from SV Sandhausen)
22	DF	GER	Timo Hübers (from 1. FC Köln II)
24	FW	GER	Niclas Füllkrug (from 1. FC Nürnberg)
29	FW	SEN	Babacar Guèye (from Troyes AC)
--	MF	GER	Maurice Hirsch (loan return from SpVgg Greuther Fürth)

Out:

No.	Pos.	Nation	Player
1	GK	GER	Ron-Robert Zieler (to Leicester City F.C.)
2	DF	DEN	Leon Andreasen (released)
4	DF	JPN	Hiroki Sakai (to Olympique de Marseille)
6	MF	TUR	Ceyhun Gülselam (to Kardemir Karabükspor)
10	MF	JPN	Hiroshi Kiyotake (to Sevilla FC)
16	MF	JPN	Hotaru Yamaguchi (to Cerezo Osaka)
19	DF	GER	Christian Schulz (to SK Sturm Graz)
22	FW	POR	Hugo Almeida (to AEK Athens F.C.)
28	FW	HUN	Ádám Szalai (loan return to 1899 Hoffenheim)
--	FW	TUR	Mevlüt Erdinç (on loan to FC Metz, previously on loan at EA Guingamp)
--	DF	BRA	Marcelo (to Beşiktaş J.K., previously on loan)

=== 1. FC Nürnberg ===
In:

No.	Pos.	Nation	Player
5	MF	KOS	Enis Alushi (from FC St. Pauli)
7	MF	CMR	Edgar Salli (from AS Monaco FC)
10	MF	GER	Tobias Kempe (from SV Darmstadt 98)
20	FW	GER	Shawn Parker (on loan from FC Augsburg)
24	FW	SVN	Tim Matavž (on loan from FC Augsburg)

Out:

No.	Pos.	Nation	Player
7	MF	GER	Danny Blum (to Eintracht Frankfurt)
8	MF	CZE	Jan Polák (to FC Zbrojovka Brno)
16	MF	HUN	Zoltán Stieber (loan return to Hamburger SV)
17	MF	GER	Sebastian Kerk (loan return to SC Freiburg)
24	FW	GER	Niclas Füllkrug (to Hannover 96)

=== FC St. Pauli ===
In:

No.	Pos.	Nation	Player
2	DF	NOR	Vegar Eggen Hedenstad (from SC Freiburg)
6	DF	GER	Christopher Avevor (from Fortuna Düsseldorf)
11	FW	MAR	Aziz Bouhaddouz (from SV Sandhausen)
19	DF	DEN	Jacob Rasmussen (from FC Schalke U19)
20	MF	GER	Richard Neudecker (from 1860 Munich)
22	MF	TUR	Cenk Şahin (on loan from İstanbul Başakşehir)
28	MF	POL	Waldemar Sobota (from Club Brugge KV, previously on loan)
34	FW	GER	Marvin Ducksch (from Borussia Dortmund II)

Out:

No.	Pos.	Nation	Player
11	MF	GER	Marc Rzatkowski (to FC Red Bull Salzburg)
12	FW	NED	John Verhoek (to 1. FC Heidenheim)
18	FW	GER	Lennart Thy (to SV Werder Bremen)
19	MF	KOS	Enis Alushi (to 1. FC Nürnberg)
22	MF	GER	Yannick Deichmann (to VfR Aalen)
29	MF	GER	Sebastian Maier (to Hannover 96)
--	FW	CRO	Ante Budimir (to F.C. Crotone, previously on loan)

=== VfL Bochum ===
In:

No.	Pos.	Nation	Player
4	MF	USA	Russell Canouse (on loan from 1899 Hoffenheim)
6	MF	AUT	Dominik Wydra (from SC Paderborn 07)
9	FW	GER	Johannes Wurtz (from SpVgg Greuther Fürth)
15	MF	KAZ	Alexander Merkel (from A.C. Pisa 1909)
17	DF	POL	Paweł Dawidowicz (on loan from S.L. Benfica)
22	MF	AUT	Kevin Stöger (from SC Paderborn 07)
23	MF	GER	Tom Weilandt (from SpVgg Greuther Fürth)
25	MF	GER	Jannik Bandowski (from Borussia Dortmund)
27	DF	GER	Nico Rieble (from TSG 1899 Hoffenheim II)
28	MF	GER	Tim Krafft (from VfL Bochum U-19)
29	DF	GER	Maxim Leitsch (from VfL Bochum U-19)
30	GK	POL	Martin Kompalla (from Borussia Mönchengladbach II)
35	MF	ARM	Hayk Galstyan (from VfL Bochum U-19)
36	FW	GER	Nils Quaschner (on loan from RB Leipzig)
38	GK	GER	Florian Kraft (from VfL Bochum U-19)
39	MF	GER	Marco Stiepermann (from SpVgg Greuther Fürth)

Out:

No.	Pos.	Nation	Player
1	GK	GER	Andreas Luthe (to FC Augsburg)
3	DF	NED	Giliano Wijnaldum (released)
4	DF	GER	Malcolm Cacutalua (loan return to Bayer 04 Leverkusen)
6	DF	CZE	Jan Šimůnek (to FK Dukla Prague)
9	FW	ANG	Nando Rafael (released)
10	FW	GER	Marco Terrazzino (to 1899 Hoffenheim)
15	FW	GER	Cagatay Kader (to FSV Frankfurt)
17	MF	GER	Tobias Weis (released)
20	MF	POL	Piotr Ćwielong (to Ruch Chorzów)
22	FW	GER	Simon Terodde (to VfB Stuttgart)
23	FW	GER	Janik Haberer (loan return to 1899 Hoffenheim)
25	MF	TUR	Onur Bulut (to SC Freiburg)
27	MF	CUW	Michaël Maria (released)
28	DF	GER	Frederik Lach (to VfB Oldenburg)
30	DF	POL	David Niepsuj (to Pogoń Szczecin)
35	MF	GER	Roman Zengin (to 1. FC Köln II)

=== 1. FC Union Berlin ===
In:

No.	Pos.	Nation	Player
1	GK	GER	Daniel Mesenhöler (from 1. FC Köln)
8	DF	DEN	Kristian Pedersen (from HB Køge)
16	FW	AUT	Philipp Hosiner (from Stade Rennais F.C.)
23	MF	GER	Felix Kroos (from SV Werder Bremen, previously on loan)
25	DF	GER	Christopher Lenz (from Borussia Mönchengladbach II)
--	GK	AUT	Michael Gspurning (from FC Schalke 04)

Out:

No.	Pos.	Nation	Player
15	FW	USA	Bobby Wood (to Hamburger SV)

=== Karlsruher SC ===
In:

No.	Pos.	Nation	Player
6	MF	CMR	Franck Kom (from ES Sahel)
7	MF	GER	Moritz Stoppelkamp (from SC Paderborn 07)

Out:

No.	Pos.	Nation	Player
3	DF	JAM	Daniel Gordon (to SV Sandhausen)
7	DF	GER	Sascha Traut (to Würzburger Kickers)
13	MF	GER	Dominic Peitz (to Holstein Kiel)
14	DF	GER	Manuel Gulde (to SC Freiburg)
23	MF	GER	Jonas Meffert (to Bayer 04 Leverkusen)
29	FW	RUS	Vadim Manzon (on loan to FK Bodø/Glimt)
--	FW	GER	Pascal Köpke (to FC Erzgebirge Aue, previously on loan)

=== Eintracht Braunschweig ===
In:

No.	Pos.	Nation	Player
5	DF	NOR	Gustav Valsvik (from Strømsgodset)
6	MF	GER	Quirin Moll (from Dynamo Dresden)
9	MF	GER	Julius Biada (from SC Fortuna Köln)
15	FW	SWE	Christoffer Nyman (from IFK Norrköping)
20	FW	NGA	Suleiman Abdullahi (from Viking FK)
23	MF	GER	Onel Hernández (from VfL Wolfsburg II)

Out:

No.	Pos.	Nation	Player
6	MF	BIH	Damir Vrančić (to Hallescher FC)
18	FW	SUI	Orhan Ademi (to SV Ried)
26	FW	GER	Julius Düker (to 1. FC Magdeburg)
31	MF	GER	Marc Pfitzner (to SV Werder Bremen II)
33	GK	POL	Rafał Gikiewicz (to SC Freiburg)
38	MF	GER	Gerrit Holtmann (to 1. FSV Mainz 05)
--	FW	DEN	Mads Dittmer Hvilsom (on loan to Esbjerg fB, previously on loan at SK Brann)

=== SpVgg Greuther Fürth ===
In:

No.	Pos.	Nation	Player
--	GK	GER	Sascha Burchert (from Hertha BSC)
--	FW	GER	Hakkı Yıldız (from FC Erzgebirge Aue)
--	DF	AUT	Lukas Gugganig (from FSV Frankfurt)
--	GK	GER	Marius Funk (from VfB Stuttgart II)
--	GK	HUN	Balázs Megyeri (from Getafe CF)
--	DF	GER	Khaled Narey (from Borussia Dortmund II)
--	FW	CIV	Mathis Bolly (from Fortuna Düsseldorf)
--	MF	TUR	Sercan Sararer (from Fortuna Düsseldorf)

Out:

No.	Pos.	Nation	Player
2	DF	GER	Benedikt Röcker (to Brøndby IF)
14	MF	GER	Tom Weilandt (to VfL Bochum)
21	GK	GER	Leopold Zingerle (to 1. FC Magdeburg)
22	FW	GER	Johannes Wurtz (to VfL Bochum)
23	MF	GER	Marco Stiepermann (to VfL Bochum)
24	MF	GER	Maurice Hirsch (loan return to Hannover 96)
30	GK	NED	Mark Flekken (to MSV Duisburg)
37	FW	GER	Stefan Maderer (on loan to FSV Frankfurt)

=== 1. FC Kaiserslautern ===
In:

No.	Pos.	Nation	Player
1	GK	GER	André Weis (from FSV Frankfurt)
13	MF	SVK	Róbert Pich (loan return from Śląsk Wrocław)
17	MF	GER	Maximilian Dittgen (from SG Sonnenhof Großaspach)
18	MF	GER	Christoph Moritz (from 1. FSV Mainz 05)
24	MF	GER	Marlon Frey (on loan from Bayer 04 Leverkusen)
35	FW	NGA	Osayamen Osawe (from Hallescher FC)
--	MF	HUN	Zoltán Stieber (from Hamburger SV)
--	DF	BIH	Mensur Mujdža (from SC Freiburg)
--	MF	GER	Sebastian Kerk (on loan from SC Freiburg)

Out:

No.	Pos.	Nation	Player
1	GK	GER	Marius Müller (to RB Leipzig)
10	FW	CRO	Antonio Čolak (loan return to TSG 1899 Hoffenheim)
11	MF	NOR	Ruben Yttergård Jenssen (to FC Groningen)
31	DF	GER	Chris Löwe (to Huddersfield Town A.F.C.)
37	MF	GER	Markus Karl (to SV Sandhausen)
39	DF	GER	Jean Zimmer (to VfB Stuttgart)

=== 1. FC Heidenheim ===
In:

No.	Pos.	Nation	Player
8	MF	AUT	Martin Rasner (from SV Grödig)
15	FW	NED	John Verhoek (from FC St. Pauli)
16	DF	GER	Robin Becker (on loan from Bayer 04 Leverkusen)
17	MF	GHA	David Atanga (on loan from Red Bull Salzburg)
21	FW	GER	Tim Kleindienst (on loan from SC Freiburg)

Out:

No.	Pos.	Nation	Player
1	GK	GER	Jan Zimmermann (to TSV 1860 Munich)
6	MF	GER	Julius Reinhardt (to Chemnitzer FC)
13	FW	GER	Robert Leipertz (to FC Schalke 04)
14	DF	GER	Maurizio Scioscia (to Stuttgarter Kickers)

=== Arminia Bielefeld ===
In:

No.	Pos.	Nation	Player
10	MF	POL	Tomasz Hołota (from Śląsk Wrocław)
19	MF	AUT	Manuel Prietl (from SV Mattersburg)
28	DF	GER	Florian Hartherz (from SC Paderborn 07)
--	DF	GER	Malcolm Cacutalua (from Bayer 04 Leverkusen)
--	FW	GER	Leandro Putaro (on loan from VfL Wolfsburg)

Out:

No.	Pos.	Nation	Player
10	FW	KOR	Ryu Seung-woo (loan return to Bayer 04 Leverkusen)

=== SV Sandhausen ===
In:

No.	Pos.	Nation	Player
5	DF	JAM	Daniel Gordon (from Karlsruher SC)
9	FW	GER	Lucas Höler (from 1. FSV Mainz 05 II)
10	FW	GER	Richard Sukuta-Pasu (from FC Energie Cottbus)
17	DF	GER	Benedikt Gimber (on loan from 1899 Hoffenheim)
23	MF	GER	Markus Karl (from 1. FC Kaiserslautern)
27	MF	GER	Maximilian Jansen (from Hallescher FC)
34	DF	GER	Tim Knipping (from Borussia Mönchengladbach II)
37	FW	GER	Julian-Maurice Derstroff (from 1. FSV Mainz 05 II)

Out:

No.	Pos.	Nation	Player
9	FW	MAR	Aziz Bouhaddouz (to FC St. Pauli)
15	MF	GER	Alexander Bieler (to Holstein Kiel)
17	DF	GER	Florian Hübner (to Hannover 96)
26	FW	GER	Ranisav Jovanović (to FSV Frankfurt)

=== Fortuna Düsseldorf ===
In:

No.	Pos.	Nation	Player
8	FW	USA	Jerome Kiesewetter (from VfB Stuttgart)
9	MF	GER	Özkan Yıldırım (from SV Werder Bremen)
10	FW	GER	Marlon Ritter (from Borussia Mönchengladbach)
22	FW	BEL	Maecky Ngombo (from Roda JC Kerkrade)
30	MF	GER	Arianit Ferati (on loan from Hamburger SV)
--	DF	TUR	Kaan Ayhan (from FC Schalke 04)

Out:

No.	Pos.	Nation	Player
5	DF	GER	Christopher Avevor (to FC St. Pauli)
10	FW	GER	Kerem Demirbay (loan return to Hamburger SV)
18	FW	CIV	Mathis Bolly (to SpVgg Greuther Fürth)
20	FW	FIN	Joel Pohjanpalo (loan return to Bayer 04 Leverkusen)
22	MF	TUR	Sercan Sararer (to SpVgg Greuther Fürth)
25	MF	AZE	Tuğrul Erat (to MSV Duisburg)
28	FW	SRB	Nikola Đurđić (loan return to FC Augsburg)
34	DF	GER	Christian Strohdiek (to SC Paderborn 07)

=== 1860 Munich ===
In:

No.	Pos.	Nation	Player
8	FW	ALG	Karim Matmour (from Huddersfield Town A.F.C.)
16	DF	GER	Marnon Busch (on loan from SV Werder Bremen)
21	GK	GER	Jan Zimmermann (from 1. FC Heidenheim)
29	MF	GER	Stefan Aigner (from Eintracht Frankfurt)
--	FW	CRO	Ivica Olić (from Hamburger SV)

Out:

No.	Pos.	Nation	Player
23	MF	GER	Maximilian Beister (loan return to 1. FSV Mainz 05)
26	DF	GER	Christopher Schindler (to Huddersfield Town A.F.C.)
31	MF	GER	Richard Neudecker (to FC St. Pauli)

=== Dynamo Dresden ===
In:

No.	Pos.	Nation	Player
3	DF	GER	Marc Wachs (from 1. FSV Mainz 05 II)
5	MF	GER	Manuel Konrad (from FSV Frankfurt)
21	DF	GER	Hendrik Starostzik (from Stuttgarter Kickers)
23	DF	GER	Florian Ballas (from FSV Frankfurt)
25	GK	GER	Marvin Schwäbe (on loan from TSG 1899 Hoffenheim)
33	MF	GER	Marcel Hilßner (from SV Werder Bremen II)
40	FW	GER	Erich Berko (from Stuttgarter Kickers)

Out:

No.	Pos.	Nation	Player
1	GK	GER	Janis Blaswich (loan return to Borussia Mönchengladbach)
5	DF	GER	Michael Hefele (to Huddersfield Town A.F.C.)
10	MF	GER	Luca Dürholtz (to Holstein Kiel)
11	MF	GER	Justin Eilers (to Werder Bremen)
21	MF	GER	Quirin Moll (to Eintracht Braunschweig)
22	MF	TUR	Sinan Tekerci (on loan to SC Preußen Münster)
31	MF	GER	Robert Andrich (to SV Wehen Wiesbaden)
35	DF	GER	Johann Weiß (to VfV Hildesheim)

=== Erzgebirge Aue ===
In:

No.	Pos.	Nation	Player
4	DF	GER	Fabian Kalig (from 1. FSV Mainz 05 II)
5	MF	GER	Clemens Fandrich (from FC Luzern)
14	FW	GER	Pascal Köpke (from Karlsruher SC, previously on loan)
18	FW	BUL	Martin Toshev (from OFC Pirin Blagoevgrad)
--	FW	GER	Tom Nattermann (loan return from FC Carl Zeiss Jena)
--	DF	GER	Jesse Sierck (from Eintracht Frankfurt U19)
--	GK	GER	Maik Ebersbach (from VfB Auerbach)
--	MF	GER	Sören Bertram (from Hallescher FC)

Out:

No.	Pos.	Nation	Player
--	FW	GER	Tom Nattermann (to FC Energie Cottbus)
4	MF	TUR	Ömer Yildirim (released)
18	DF	GER	Nils Miatke (to FSV Zwickau)
22	FW	TUR	Hakkı Yıldız (to SpVgg Greuther Fürth)
23	MF	GER	Mike Könnecke (to FSV Zwickau)
26	GK	GER	Robert Jendrusch (to VfB Auerbach)

=== Würzburger Kickers ===
In:

No.	Pos.	Nation	Player
6	MF	GRE	Anastasios Lagos (from Panathinaikos)
7	DF	GER	Felix Müller (from SC Preußen Münster)
15	DF	CRO	Franko Uzelac (from VfB Oldenburg)
17	DF	GER	Sascha Traut (from Karlsruher SC)
21	MF	GER	Tobias Schröck (from SG Sonnenhof Großaspach)
23	FW	GER	Patrick Weihrauch (from FC Bayern Munich II)
27	FW	GER	Marco Königs (from SC Fortuna Köln)
29	DF	GER	Sebastian Neumann (from VfR Aalen)

Out:

No.	Pos.	Nation	Player
8	MF	GER	Liridon Vocaj (to Rot-Weiß Erfurt)
17	FW	GER	Daniele Bruno (to SpVgg Unterhaching)
27	FW	GER	Adam Jabiri (to 1. FC Schweinfurt 05)
31	DF	GER	Nico Herzig (to TSV Steinbach)
32	MF	GER	Lukas Billick (to SV Eintracht Trier 05)
37	FW	GER	Christopher Bieber (to Rot-Weiß Erfurt)

== See also ==
- 2016–17 Bundesliga
- 2016–17 2. Bundesliga
