= Çağlar Söyüncü =

Turkish footballer (born 1996)

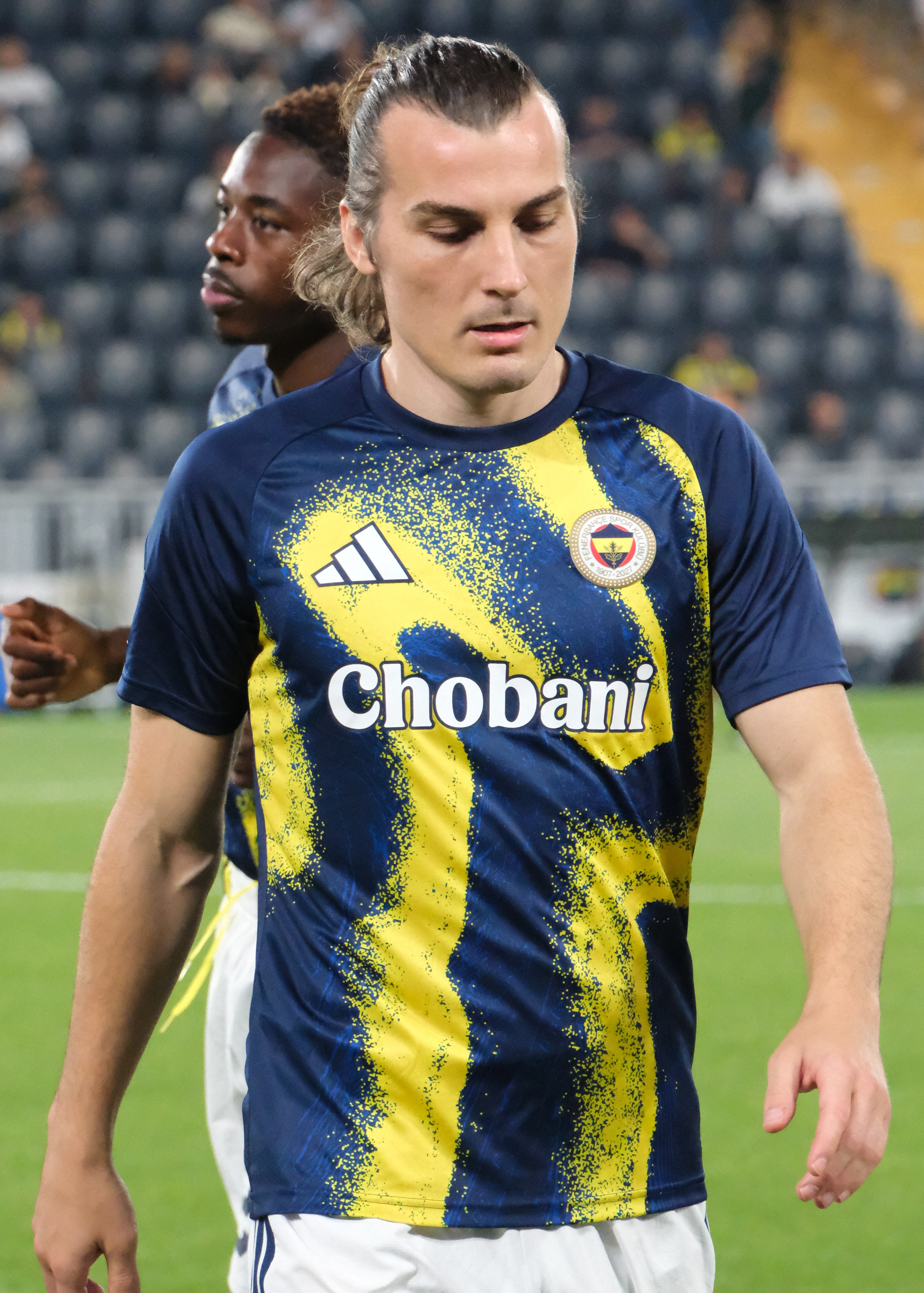
- Söyüncü with Fenerbahçe in 2026

Personal information
- Full name: Çağlar Söyüncü
- Date of birth: 23 May 1996 (age 30)
- Place of birth: İzmir, Turkey
- Height: 1.85 m (6 ft 1 in)
- Position: Centre-back

Team information
- Current team: Çorum
- Number: 2

Youth career
- 2006–2011: Menemen Belediyespor
- 2011–2013: Bucaspor
- 2013–2014: Gümüşorduspor

Senior career*
Years	Team	Apps	(Gls)
2014–2016	Altınordu	34	(2)
2016–2018	SC Freiburg	50	(1)
2018–2023	Leicester City	98	(4)
2023–2024	Atlético Madrid	6	(0)
2024	→ Fenerbahçe (loan)	12	(2)
2024–2026	Fenerbahçe	36	(1)
2026–	Çorum	3	(0)

International career^{‡}
2014	Turkey U18	1	(0)
2015	Turkey U19	3	(0)
2015	Turkey U20	3	(0)
2015	Turkey U21	1	(0)
2016–	Turkey	61	(2)
- * Club domestic league appearances and goals as of 16 October 2026 ‡ National team caps and goals as of 26 June 2026

Çağlar Söyüncü (Turkish pronunciation: [tʃaːˈɫaɾ sœjynˈdʒy]; born 23 May 1996) is a Turkish professional footballer who plays as a centre-back for Süper Lig club Çorum and the Turkey national team.

Söyüncü's first senior professional team was the Turkish second division Altınordu. In the summer of 2016, he joined SC Freiburg of Germany's Bundesliga, before moving to Leicester City in 2018. He made 132 total appearances for Leicester, winning the FA Cup and FA Community Shield in 2021. In 2023, he moved to Atlético Madrid of La Liga and soon on to Fenerbahçe, initially on loan.

Söyüncü made his senior national team debut in 2016 and has earned over 60 caps for Turkey. He was part of the Turkish squads at UEFA Euro 2020 and the 2026 FIFA World Cup.

== Club career ==
=== Altınordu ===
Söyüncü began his senior professional career with Altınordu in the TFF First League, the second level of the Turkish football league system. During the 2015–16 season with Altınordu, Söyüncü was linked with Beşiktaş, Galatasaray and Sevilla, but he selected the Bundesliga because he thought it was better choice for his career and his improvement.

=== SC Freiburg ===
On 24 May 2016, in the 2016 Bundesliga summer transfer window, Söyüncü joined German side SC Freiburg, which was promoted to the top flight competition of Germany for the 2016–17 season. He is the first Turkish footballer who made a transfer to the Bundesliga directly from the TFF First League, the second-highest professional level football league of Turkey.

He made his Bundesliga debut away against Hertha Berlin which ended in a 2–1 loss, on 28 August 2016. He was linked with Lille, Roma, and Villarreal during the mid-season transfer window of the 2016–17 season. Manchester City was also reported to be interested in Söyüncü.

=== Leicester City ===
On 9 August 2018, Söyüncü joined English Premier League side Leicester City on a five-year contract. He signed for an apparent £18 million transfer fee, possibly rising to £20 million with add-ons. Söyüncü had his Premier League debut on 27 October 2018 at the King Power Stadium where Leicester shared points with West Ham United following the final score of 1–1.

Söyüncü scored his first Premier League goal in Leicester's 11th game of the 2019–20 season on 3 November 2019 against Crystal Palace at Selhurst Park, a 2–0 win. His performances during the 2019–20 season earned him a place in the Premier League PFA Team of the Year.

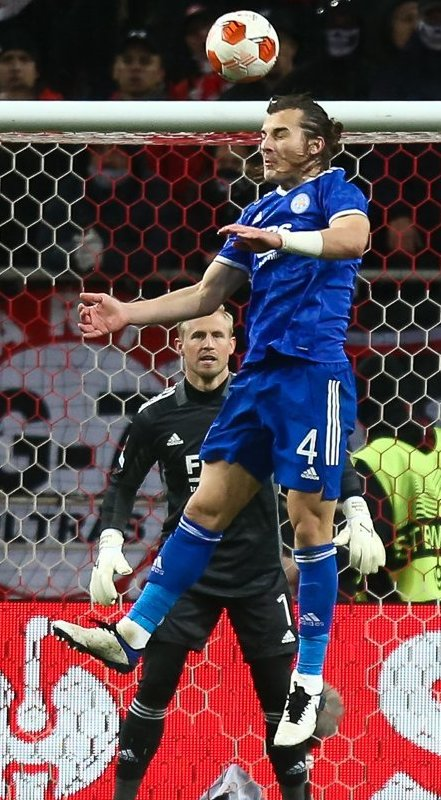
Söyüncü after heading the ball during a Leicester City match in 2021

On 11 May 2021, Söyüncü scored the winning goal for Leicester City in a 2–1 away victory over Manchester United, to be their first win at Old Trafford since 1998. Four days later he played in the 2021 FA Cup final against Chelsea, a 1–0 win; Jacob Steinburg of The Guardian said he stood firm after fellow defender Jonny Evans was substituted with injury. In August, he featured in the 2021 FA Community Shield, a 1–0 win against league champions Manchester City.

During the 2022–23 season Söyüncü found himself out of the first 11, despite having played more than 20 matches per season for the previous three seasons. This was allegedly due to a personality clash with manager Brendan Rodgers. Söyüncü impressed when he was restored to the team after Dean Smith took over as manager, however this was insufficient to prevent relegation. On 5 June 2023, following the club's relegation from the Premier League, it was announced that Söyüncü and six other first team players would be leaving the club upon the expiration of their contracts at the end of the month.

=== Atlético Madrid ===
On 5 July 2023, following Leicester City's relegation from Premier League, Söyüncü joined Spanish La Liga side Atlético Madrid on a four-year deal. He played nine games, of which six in the league (115 minutes), two in the UEFA Champions League (59 minutes) and one half of a Copa del Rey match. He was sent off in a 1–0 win over Sevilla on 23 December for a foul on Lucas Ocampos, only four minutes after coming on as a substitute.

=== Fenerbahçe ===
On 29 January 2024, Söyüncü signed for Süper Lig club Fenerbahçe on loan for the rest of the season. On 3 February 2024, he make his Süper Lig debut in his career against Antalyaspor in a 2–0 away win. Four days later, on 7 February 2024, he made his Turkish Cup debut with the team against Gaziantep in a 2–0 away win and helped his team to reached quarter final. On 8 March 2024, he made his continental debut with the team in a 3–0 away victory against Union SG, also made an assist.

He scored twice in his first half-season, including the only goal on 19 May away to rivals Galatasaray. His move became permanent on 1 July, on a three-year deal with the option for one more. Atlético, who had paid no fee to sign him, received €8 million in the deal. His contract with the club was terminated by mutual consent on 4 September 2026.

== International career ==
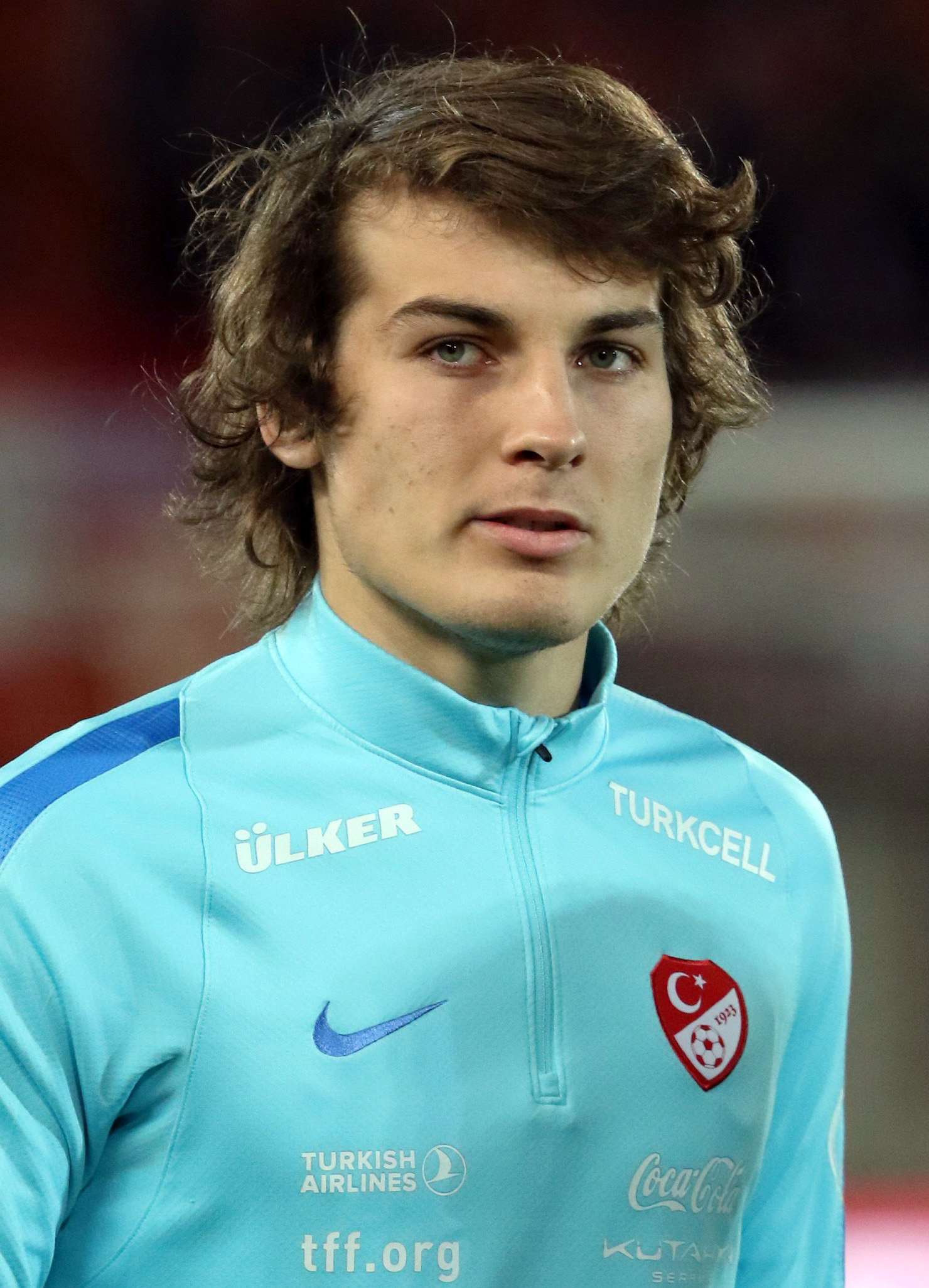
Söyüncü with Turkey in 2016

In November 2015, he was called up to Turkey national football team by coach Fatih Terim, following the injury of central defender Serdar Aziz.

Söyüncü is the first Altınordu player called up to Turkey national football team after 78 years, since Sait Altınordu, the iconic player of the club, was selected in 1937. He is also the first player called up to national team from any İzmir-based football clubs since 1997. On 17 November 2015, Söyüncü was a reserve for the friendly game against Greece, but stayed on the bench and did not actually get a chance to play. On 18 March 2016, he was called to national squad for friendly games against Sweden and Austria, to be held on 24 March 2016 in Antalya, Turkey and on 29 March in Austria, respectively. Substituting for Ozan Tufan in the dying minutes of a friendly game against Sweden, Söyüncü earned his first senior national team cap on 24 March 2016. Earning his second cap, he was in the starting line-up in the friendly with Russia on 1 September 2016, which ended 0–0. On 1 June 2018, Söyüncü scored his first senior international goal on a friendly game against Tunisia, held at Stade de Genève, Geneva, Switzerland. On 1 June 2021, he was selected in the 26-man squad for the UEFA Euro 2020. On 24 May 2024, he was named in the 35-man preliminary squad for the UEFA Euro 2024. However, on 29 May, he was withdrawn due to injury.

On 2 June 2026, Söyüncü was selected in the 26-man squad for the 2026 FIFA World Cup.

== Style of play and reception ==
Possessing leadership attributes, Söyüncü is good at playmaking, dribbling and timing. Standing at 1.85 m (6 ft 1 in), he is strong in the air. In 2016, he stated that his idol is Spanish defender Carles Puyol and he admires German international Mats Hummels.

Former English international and current pundit Martin Keown analysed Söyüncü for BBC Sport in 2019, describing him "a defender made for the modern game", highlighting his agility, aggressiveness and heading attributes.

== Personal life ==
Söyüncü is a longtime fan of Fenerbahçe since his childhood.

== Career statistics ==
=== Club ===
As of match played 17 May 2026

Appearances and goals by club, season and competition
Club	Season	League			National cup (Note: Includes Turkish Cup, DFB-Pokal, FA Cup)		League cup (Note: Includes EFL Cup)		Europe		Other		Total	
Club	Season	Division	Apps	Goals	Apps	Goals	Apps	Goals	Apps	Goals	Apps	Goals	Apps	Goals
Altınordu	2014–15	TFF First League	4	0	6	0	—		—		—		10	0
Altınordu	2015–16	TFF First League	30	2	0	0	—		—		—		30	2
Altınordu	Total		34	2	6	0	0	0	0	0	0	0	40	2
SC Freiburg	2016–17	Bundesliga	24	0	1	0	—		—		—		25	0
SC Freiburg	2017–18	Bundesliga	26	1	2	0	—		2 (Note: Appearances in UEFA Europa League)	0	—		30	1
SC Freiburg	Total		50	1	3	0	0	0	2	0	0	0	55	1
Leicester City	2018–19	Premier League	6	0	0	0	2	0	—		—		8	0
Leicester City	2019–20	Premier League	34	1	4	0	4	0	—		—		42	1
Leicester City	2020–21	Premier League	23	1	6	0	0	0	3	0	—		32	1
Leicester City	2021–22	Premier League	28	1	1	0	3	0	8 (Note: Six appearances in UEFA Europa League, two appearances in UEFA Europa Conference League)	0	1 (Note: Appearance in FA Community Shield)	0	41	1
Leicester City	2022–23	Premier League	7	1	1	0	1	0	—		—		9	1
Leicester City	Total		98	4	12	0	10	0	11	0	1	0	132	4
Atlético Madrid	2023–24	La Liga	6	0	1	0	—		2 (Note: Appearances in UEFA Champions League)	0	0	0	9	0
Fenerbahçe (loan)	2023–24	Süper Lig	12	2	1	0	—		3 (Note: Appearances in UEFA Europa Conference League)	0	0	0	16	2
Fenerbahçe	2024–25	Süper Lig	25	1	4	0	—		11 (Note: Four appearances in UEFA Champions League, seven appearances and one goal in UEFA Europa League)	1	—		40	2
Fenerbahçe	2025–26	Süper Lig	11	0	2	0	—		4 (Note: One appearance in UEFA Champions League, three appearances in UEFA Europa League)	0	2 (Note: Appearances in Turkish Super Cup)	0	19	0
Fenerbahçe	Total		48	3	7	0	0	0	18	1	2	0	75	4
Career total			235	10	29	0	10	0	33	2	3	0	311	12

=== International ===
As of match played 25 June 2026

Appearances and goals by national team and year
National team	Year	Apps	Goals
Turkey	2016	2	0
Turkey	2017	9	0
Turkey	2018	11	1
Turkey	2019	6	0
Turkey	2020	2	0
Turkey	2021	13 (Note: Three appearances in UEFA Euro 2020)	1
Turkey	2022	8	0
Turkey	2023	4	0
Turkey	2024	1	0
Turkey	2025	3	0
Turkey	2026	2 (Note: One appearance in 2026 FIFA World Cup)	0
Total		61	2

Scores and results list Turkey's goal tally first.

List of international goals scored by Çağlar Söyüncü
No.	Date	Venue	Opponent	Score	Result	Competition
1	1 June 2018	Stade de Genève, Geneva, Switzerland	Tunisia	2–2	2–2	Friendly
2	27 March 2021	La Rosaleda, Málaga, Spain	Norway	2–0	3–0	2022 FIFA World Cup qualification

== Honours ==
Leicester City

- FA Cup: 2020–21
- FA Community Shield: 2021

Fenerbahçe

- Turkish Super Cup: 2025

Individual

- Turkish Footballer of the Year: 2019
- PFA Team of the Year: 2019–20 Premier League
