= Hakkı Yıldız =

Turkish-German footballer

Personal information
- Full name: Hakkı Yıldız
- Date of birth: 12 December 1995 (age 30)
- Place of birth: Nördlingen, Germany
- Height: 1.86 m (6 ft 1 in)
- Position: Forward

Team information
- Current team: Niğde Anadolu
- Number: 9

Youth career
- SV Eintracht Kirchheim
- –2010: TSV Nördlingen
- 2010–2012: VfR Aalen
- 2012–2013: Chemnitzer FC
- 2013: FC Augsburg
- 2013–2014: Erzgebirge Aue

Senior career*
Years	Team	Apps	(Gls)
2014–2015	Erzgebirge Aue II	28	(7)
2015–2016	Erzgebirge Aue	2	(0)
2016–2017	Greuther Fürth II	23	(2)
2017–2018	Menemen Belediyespor	4	(0)
2018	→ Darıca Gençlerbirliği (loan)	14	(4)
2018–2019	Keçiörengücü	0	(0)
2019–	→ Hekimoğlu Trabzon (loan)	8	(0)
2019–	Niğde Anadolu	1	(0)
- * Club domestic league appearances and goals as of 02:04, 5 September 2019 (UTC)

Hakkı Yıldız (born 12 December 1995) is a Turkish-German footballer who plays as a forward for Niğde Anadolu.
