= Florian Stritzel =

German footballer (born 1994)

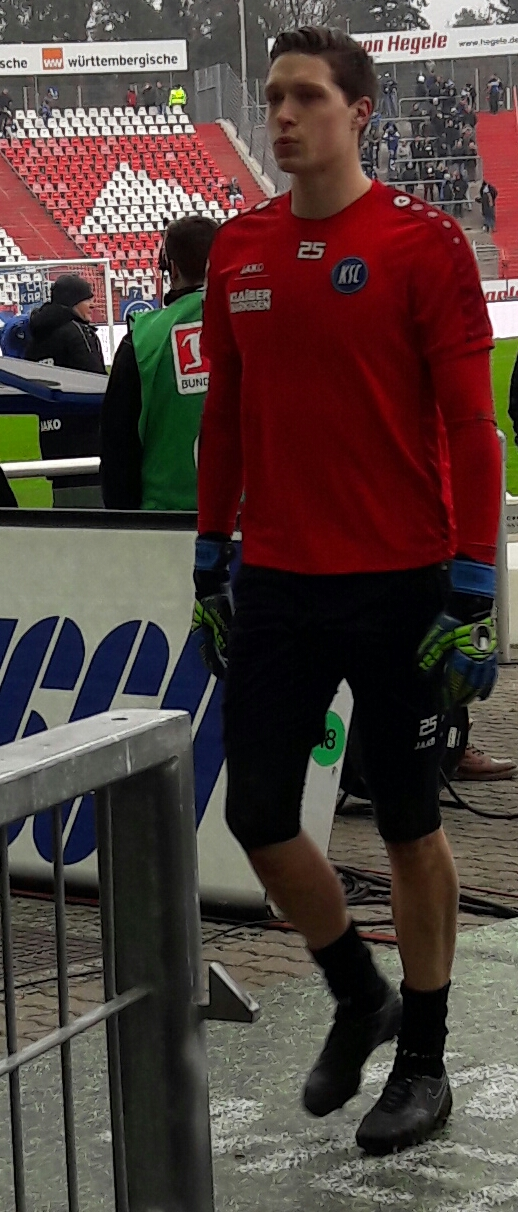
- Stritzel in 2016

Personal information
- Date of birth: 31 January 1994 (age 32)
- Place of birth: Anklam, Germany
- Height: 1.97 m (6 ft 6 in)
- Position: Goalkeeper

Team information
- Current team: SV Wehen Wiesbaden
- Number: 16

Youth career
- 2000–2004: Torgelower SV Greif
- 2004–2007: 1. FC Neubrandenburg 04
- 2007–2013: Hamburger SV

Senior career*
Years	Team	Apps	(Gls)
2012–2014	Hamburger SV II	21	(0)
2014–2017	Karlsruher SC II	56	(0)
2014–2017	Karlsruher SC	0	(0)
2017–2021	Darmstadt 98	9	(0)
2021–	SV Wehen Wiesbaden	134	(0)

International career^{‡}
2010	Germany U16	1	(0)
2011	Germany U17	1	(0)
2011–2012	Germany U18	3	(0)
- * Club domestic league appearances and goals as of 29 May 2026 ‡ National team caps and goals as of 17:14, 24 November 2017 (UTC)

Florian Stritzel (born 31 January 1994) is a German professional footballer who plays as a goalkeeper for SV Wehen Wiesbaden.

== Career ==
Stritzel joined the youth academy of Hamburger SV at age 13. In 2013, he joined the senior team, but he never played in the Bundesliga.

After years in Hamburg and Karlsruhe, he signed a contract with Darmstadt 98 in 2017. On 24 November 2017, Stritzel made his debut in the 2. Bundesliga. After only nine appearances in four years, he joined SV Wehen Wiesbaden in 2021. In Wiesbaden, Stritzel became number one goalkeeper.
