= Julian von Haacke =

German footballer (born 1994)

Personal information
- Date of birth: 14 February 1994 (age 32)
- Place of birth: Bremen, Germany
- Height: 1.81 m (5 ft 11 in)
- Position: Midfielder

Team information
- Current team: TuS Dassendorf
- Number: 3

Youth career
- 1998–2005: Post SV Bremen
- 2005–2006: Union 60 Bremen
- 2006–2013: Werder Bremen

Senior career*
Years	Team	Apps	(Gls)
2013–2016	Werder Bremen II	61	(8)
2013–2016	Werder Bremen	0	(0)
2016–2017	NEC	30	(2)
2017–2019	Darmstadt 98	5	(0)
2018–2019	→ SV Meppen (loan)	18	(2)
2019–2022	Austria Klagenfurt	20	(3)
2023	Weiche Flensburg 08	13	(0)
2023–2024	Sporting Hortaleza		
2024–	TuS Dassendorf	0	(0)
- * Club domestic league appearances and goals as of 19:07, 6 August 2023 (UTC)

Julian von Haacke (born 14 February 1994) is a German professional footballer who plays as a midfielder for Oberliga Hamburg club TuS Dassendorf.

== Early life ==
Von Haacke was born in Bremen, Germany on 14 February 1994.

== Career ==
=== Early career and Werder Bremen ===
Von Haacke was with Post SV Bremen from 1998 to 2005 and Union 60 Bremen from 2005 to 2006 before joining Werder Bremen on 1 July 2006.

Von Haacke made his debut for the club's reserves in a 1–0 loss to SV Meppen on 11 August 2013. He finished the 2013–14 season with three goals in 27 appearances. During the 2014–15 season, von Haacke only made five league appearances scoring one goal and two appearances in the promotional playoff being sidelined with a cruciate ligament injury for most of the season. Werder Bremen II were promoted to the 3. Liga for the 2015–16 season where von Haacke made his professional debut in a 2–1 win against Hansa Rostock on 25 July 2015.

=== NEC ===
In June 2016, von Haacke signed a three-year contract with Eredivisie side NEC.

=== Darmstadt 98 ===
In June 2017, von Haacke moved to 2. Bundesliga club Darmstadt 98 on a three-year contract, joining up with manager Torsten Frings who managed him as assistant coach to Viktor Skrypnyk in Werder Bremen's reserve team. The transfer fee was not disclosed.

Von Haacke was released from Darmstadt's training in summer 2018 and occasionally trained with the Werder Bremen reserves in July and August.

On 22 August 2018, he moved to 3. Liga side SV Meppen on loan for the 2018–19 season.

=== Austria Klagenfurt ===
On 16 September 2019, von Haacke joined Austrian club Austria Klagenfurt on a contract for the 2019–20 season.

== Career statistics ==
As of match played 6 August 2023

Appearances and goals by club, season and competition
Club	Season	League			Cup		Other		Total		Ref.
Club	Season	Division	Apps	Goals	Apps	Goals	Apps	Goals	Apps	Goals	Ref.
Werder Bremen II	2013–14	Regionalliga Nord	27	3	—		—		27	3	
Werder Bremen II	2014–15	Regionalliga Nord	5	1	—		2 (Note: Two appearances in the playoffs for promotion to the 3. Liga)	0	7	1	
Werder Bremen II	2015–16	3. Liga	29	4	—		—		29	4	
Werder Bremen II	Total		61	8	0	0	2	0	63	8	—
NEC	2016–17	Eredivisie	30	2	1	0	3 (Note: Three appearances in the Eredivisie relegation playoffs)	0	34	2	
Darmstadt 98	2017–18	2. Bundesliga	5	0	1	0	–		6	0	
SV Meppen (loan)	2018–19	3. Liga	18	2	0	0	–		18	2	
Austria Klagenfurt	2019–20	Austrian Second League	12	1	0	0	–		12	1	
Austria Klagenfurt	2020–21	Austrian Second League	5	2	1	0	–		6	2	
Austria Klagenfurt	2021–22	Austrian Bundesliga	3	0	0	0	–		3	0	
Austria Klagenfurt	Total		20	3	1	0	0	0	21	3	—
Weiche Flensburg 08	2022–23	Regionalliga Nord	13	0	0	0	–		13	0	
Career total			147	15	3	0	5	0	155	15	—
