= Sandro Sirigu =

Italian-German footballer

Personal information
- Full name: Sandro Sirigu
- Date of birth: 7 October 1988 (age 38)
- Place of birth: Ulm, West Germany
- Height: 1.83 m (6 ft 0 in)
- Position: Right-back

Youth career
- –2006: SSV Ulm

Senior career*
| Years | Team | Apps | (Gls) |
| 2006–2009 | SSV Ulm | 55 | (2) |
| 2009–2010 | SC Freiburg II | 41 | (7) |
| 2010–2013 | 1. FC Heidenheim | 75 | (2) |
| 2013–2019 | Darmstadt 98 | 126 | (4) |
| 2019–2020 | Chemnitzer FC | 14 | (0) |
| 2020–2021 | Sonnenhof Großaspach | 23 | (0) |
- * Club domestic league appearances and goals as of 00:14, 8 February 2022 (UTC)

Sandro Sirigu (Italian: [ˈsandro ˈsiːriɡu], Sardinian: [ˈsandɾu ˈziɾiɣu]; born 7 October 1988) is an Italian-German former professional footballer who played as a right-back, most recently for Sonnenhof Großaspach in the Regionalliga Südwest.

== Career ==
On 1 December 2019, Sirigu joined 3. Liga club Chemnitzer FC on a free transfer.

In July 2020, he signed for Sonnenhof Großaspach on a two-year contract.
