= Silas Zehnder =

German footballer

Personal information
- Date of birth: 30 June 1999 (age 27)
- Place of birth: Stockstadt am Rhein, Germany
- Height: 1.69 m (5 ft 7 in)
- Position: Forward

Team information
- Current team: Viktoria Aschaffenburg

Youth career
- –2017: Darmstadt 98

Senior career*
Years	Team	Apps	(Gls)
2017–2021	Darmstadt 98	1	(0)
2018–2020	→ Viktoria Aschaffenburg (loan)	32	(1)
2021–	Viktoria Aschaffenburg	1	(0)
- * Club domestic league appearances and goals as of 22:35, 2 August 2021 (UTC)

Silas Zehnder (born 30 June 1999) is a German professional footballer who plays as a forward for Viktoria Aschaffenburg.
