= Ihor Berezovskyi =

Ukrainian football goalkeeper

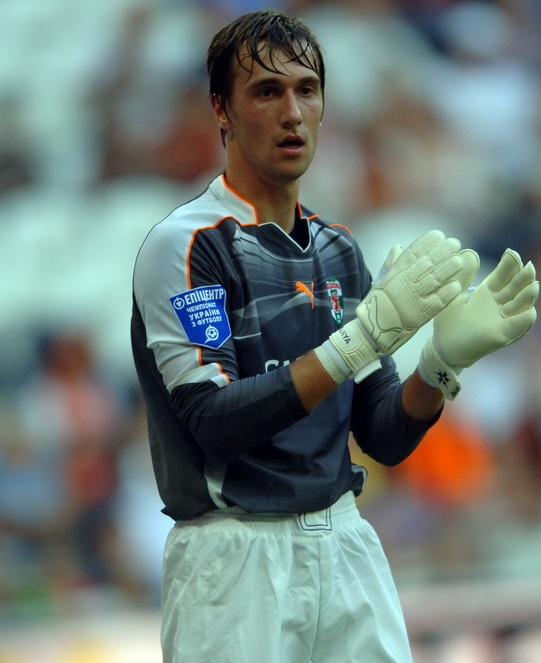
- Berezovskyi in 2011

Personal information
- Full name: Ihor Olehovych Berezovskyi
- Date of birth: 24 August 1990 (age 36)
- Place of birth: Kirovohrad, Ukrainian SSR
- Height: 1.94 m (6 ft 4 in)
- Position: Goalkeeper

Youth career
- 2001–2004: Olimpik Kirovohrad
- 2004–2006: Sportive School #2 Kirovohrad
- 2006–2007: PFC Oleksandria-Ametyst
- 2007: Dnipro Dnipropetrovsk

Senior career*
Years	Team	Apps	(Gls)
2007–2008	Olimpik Kirovohrad	3	(0)
2008–2009	Zirka Kirovohrad	1	(0)
2010–2013	Obolon Kyiv	28	(0)
2013	Legia Warsaw	0	(0)
2013–2015	Lierse	25	(0)
2015	→ Sint-Truiden (loan)	4	(0)
2016–2017	Darmstadt 98	0	(0)
2019–2020	Darmstadt 98	0	(0)
Total		61	(0)

International career
2011–2012	Ukraine U21	15	(0)
- * Club domestic league appearances and goals

Ihor Berezovskyi (Ukrainian: Ігор Олегович Березовський; born 24 August 1990) is a Ukrainian former professional footballer who played as a goalkeeper.

== Career ==
Berezovskyi is a product of youth team systems of Kirovohrad city. He made his debut for Obolon Kyiv entering as a substitute in a Ukrainian Premier League game against Shakhtar Donetsk on 9 April 2011. He left Obolon after the club dissolved in February 2013.

On 22 July 2013, Berezovskyi joined Belgian Pro League side Lierse on a three-year contract.
