= Immanuel Höhn =

German footballer

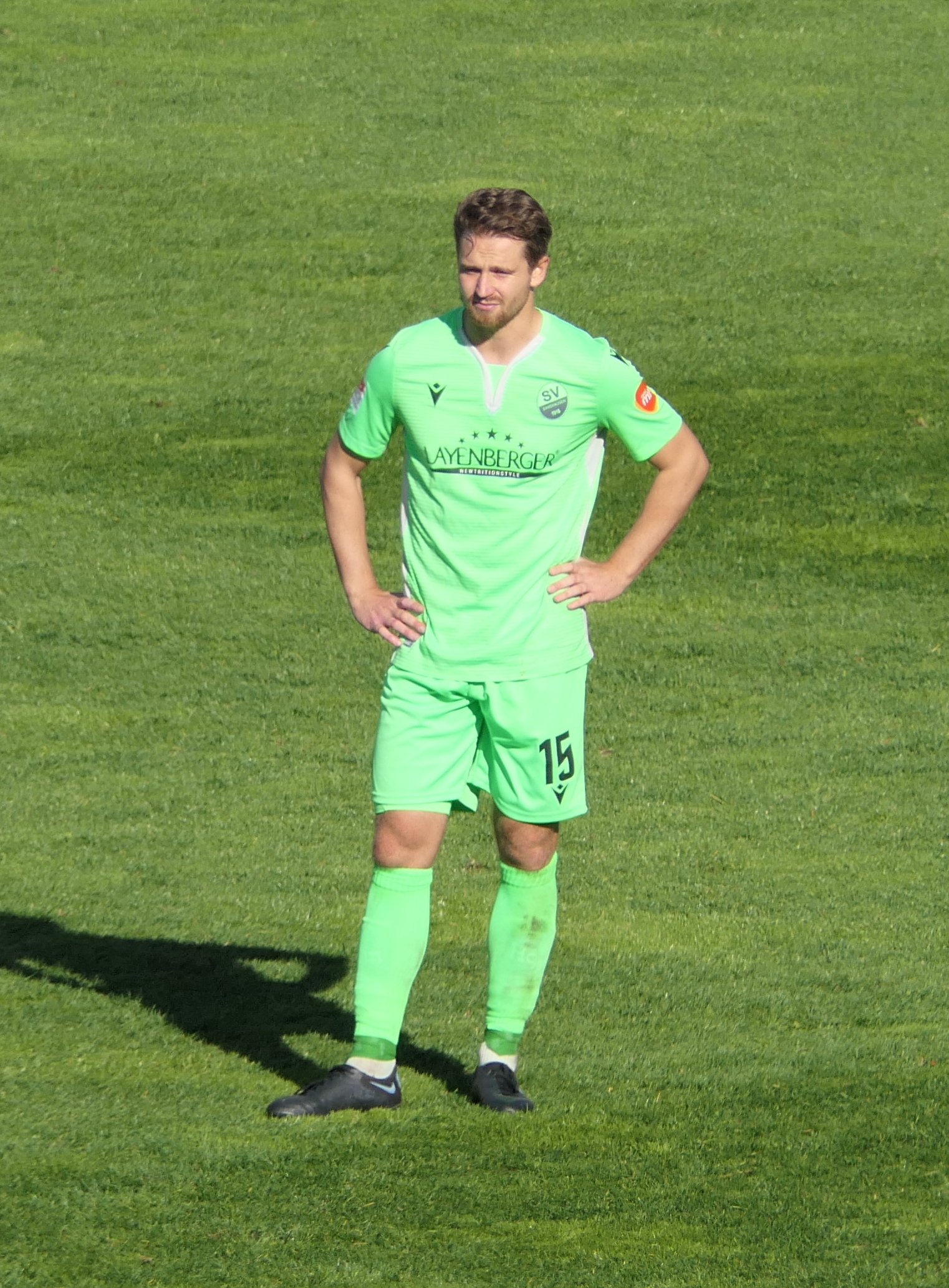

Personal information
- Date of birth: 23 December 1991 (age 34)
- Place of birth: Mainz, Germany
- Height: 1.83 m (6 ft 0 in)
- Position: Centre back

Team information
- Current team: FC Teutonia Ottensen
- Number: 21

Youth career
- 1994–2002: Hassia Bingen
- 2002–2005: 1. FC Kaiserslautern
- 2005–2007: Hassia Bingen
- 2007–2008: FK Pirmasens
- 2008–2010: SC Freiburg

Senior career*
Years	Team	Apps	(Gls)
2010–2015	SC Freiburg II	70	(3)
2012–2016	SC Freiburg	68	(4)
2016–2021	Darmstadt 98	108	(6)
2021–2023	SV Sandhausen	41	(3)
2023–	FC Teutonia Ottensen	13	(1)
- * Club domestic league appearances and goals as of 23 April 2024

Immanuel Höhn (born 23 December 1991) is a German professional footballer who plays as a centre back for FC Teutonia Ottensen.
