= Italians in Germany =

German citizens of Italian descent

Italian Germans
Italo-tedeschi (Italian) Deutschitaliener (German)
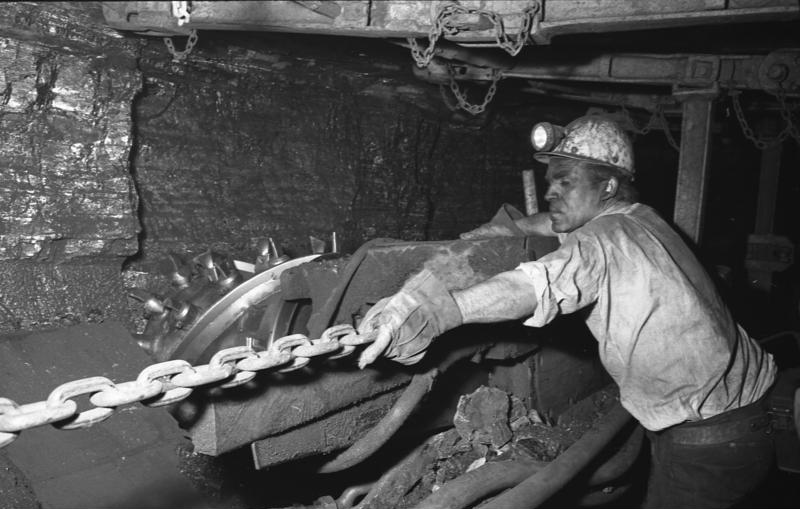
- Italian worker in Duisburg in 1962

Total population
- c. 1,000,000 (by ancestry)

Regions with significant populations
- Berlin · Frankfurt · Stuttgart · Cologne · Munich · Rhein-Ruhr · Nuremberg · Freiburg · Hamburg · Mainz

Languages
- German · Italian · other languages of Italy

Religion
- Major Catholicism · Lutheranism · Others

Related ethnic groups
- Italians, Italian Belgians, Italian Britons, Italian Finns, Italian French, Italian Romanians, Italian Spaniards, Italian Swedes, Italian Swiss, Corfiot Italians, Genoese in Gibraltar, Italians of Crimea, Italians of Odesa

Italian Germans (Italian: italo-tedeschi; German: Deutschitaliener) are German-born or naturalized citizens who are fully or partially of Italian descent, whose ancestors were Italians who emigrated to Germany during the Italian diaspora, and Italians from South Tyrol. Most Italians moved to Germany for reasons of work, others for personal relations, study, or political reasons. Today, Italians in Germany form one of the largest Italian diasporas in the world and account for one of the largest immigrant groups in Germany.

It is not clear how many people in Germany are of Italian descent, since the German government does not collect data on ethnicity. However, based on the German "microcensus," which surveys 1% of the German population annually and includes a question on the nationality of the surveyees' parents, the number is at least 873,000 people.

== History ==
=== Pre-unification (to 1871) ===
Large numbers of Italians have resided in Germany since the early Middle Ages, particularly architects, craftsmen and traders. During the late Middle Ages and early modern times many Italians came to Germany for business, and relations between the two countries prospered. The political borders were also somewhat intertwined under the German princes' attempts to extend control over all the Holy Roman Empire, which extended from northern Germany down to Northern Italy. During the Renaissance many Italian bankers, architects and artists moved to Germany and successfully integrated in the German society.

=== German unification to end of World War II (1871–1945) ===
Germany was a comparatively minor destination of Italians during the waves of Italian emigration after Italian unification and the resulting breakdown of the feudal system, with most leaving for the Americas. Between 1876, the year Italy began keeping track of people leaving the country permanently, and 1915, around 1.2 million Italians moved to Germany. For comparison, a total of 14 million Italians emigrated to various parts of the world during this period. The official population number of Italians in Germany rose from 8,000 in 1880, to 70,000 in 1900 and 100,000 in 1910.

=== Post-World War II (1945–1990) ===
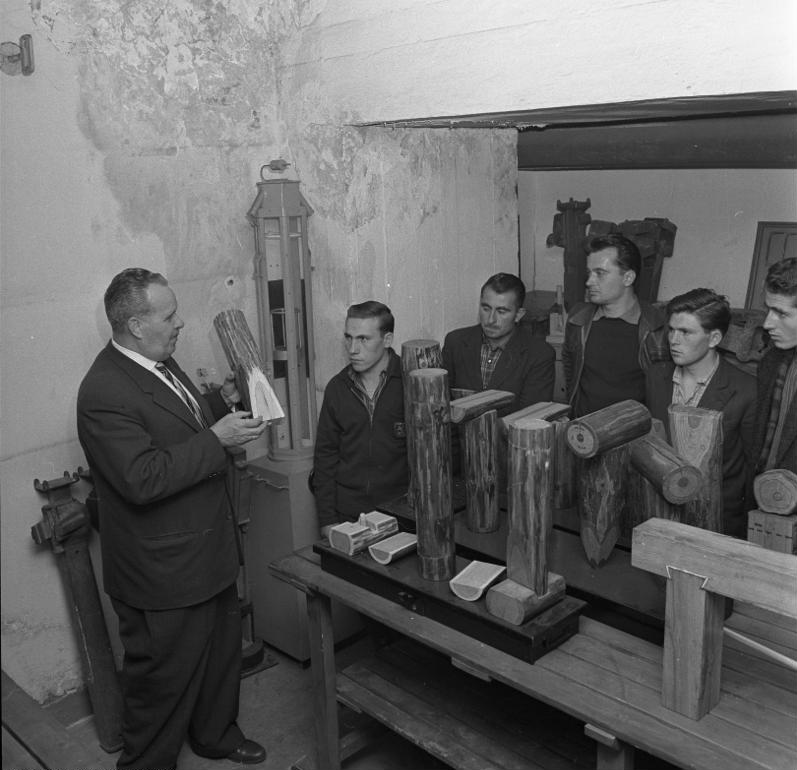
Italian emigrants in Germany (called "Gastarbeiter"), receiving instruction in 1962

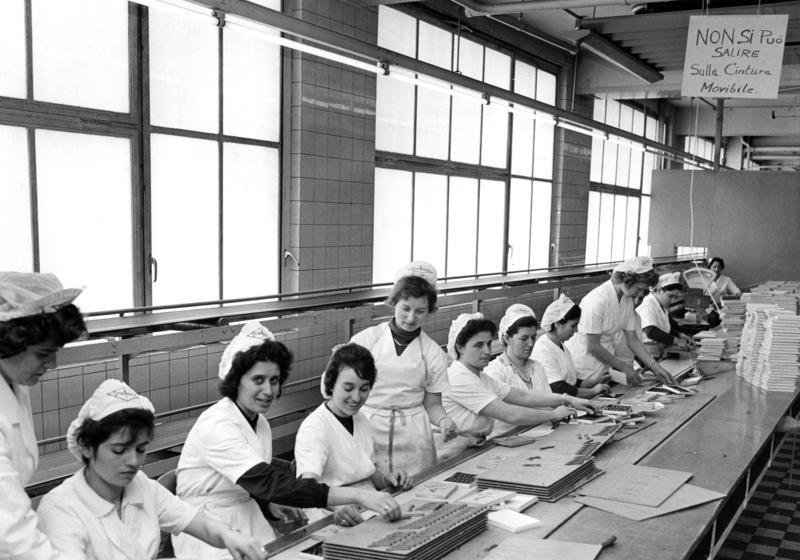
Italian workers in Cologne in 1962

With Germany's post-World War II economic boom (Wirtschaftswunder), the country signed a number of immigration treaties with other mostly European nations starting in 1955 with Italy, which allowed immigrants to move to Germany in large numbers to work and live. The treaty allowed companies experiencing labour shortages to request the transference of Italian workers via the Italian Ministry of Labour. Italy had signed a number of such treaties with other countries in Europe, Oceania and South America in the 1950s to alleviate widespread unemployment. The biggest sectors for which migrants were recruited to Germany were mining, construction and manufacturing. Companies recruiting Italian workers were concentrated primarily in Germany's southeast, especially the industrial states of Baden-Württemberg, North Rhine-Westphalia, Bavaria and Hesse. Today, these regions are home to the country's biggest Italian-German communities.

In 1973, due to that year's oil crisis and a resulting recession, Germany annulled the immigration treaties it had signed. However, by then the European Coal and Steel Community (later the European Economic Community), of which both Italy and Germany were members, had established freedom of movement for workers (beginning in 1968). As a result, Italians continued to be able to move to Germany for work with relative ease. An estimated 2 million Italians moved to Germany between 1956 and 1972 alone, especially from southern and northeastern Italy. The majority of Italians that came with this first wave of immigration were men without families; most intended to return there in the medium term, although a great many ended up settling in Germany permanently. From the early 1970s onward, many of these workers' families joined them. The total number of Italians who moved to Germany between 1955 and 2005 is estimated at 3−4 million.

Initially seen as temporary "guest workers" by both Germany and Italy, almost no effort was made at first to ease the assimilation of immigrants into German society. Adults were not encouraged to learn German and schools were instructed to encourage students' ties to their parents' culture to promote their eventual return. Nonetheless, Italian immigrants gradually began to integrate. While most of the Italians among the 1955–1973 wave of immigrants were employed as labourers in the mining, construction and manufacturing sectors, they began to diversify into more skilled employment, especially in the automotive and electronics industry and mechanical engineering. A growing market for Italian cuisine among the local German population also led many to open restaurants. These trends contributed to the gradual upward mobility of Italian immigrants and their descendants.

=== After reunification (1990–present) ===
Socioeconomic indicators on immigrant groups in Germany are generally hard to come by, since most studies collect data only on the basis of citizenship, which excludes German citizens of Italian descent. However, a study in 2005 showed that Italian-German students remain over-represented in the lower tier of German secondary education (Hauptschulen) and underrepresented in the middle and highest tiers (Realschulen and Gymnasiums). They also remain underrepresented in company leadership positions, the civil service, and white-collar employment. Nevertheless, the gaps are much less extreme than during the era of the biggest waves of arrivals in the mid-20th century, demonstrating the strides the Italian-German community has made since. Although Italians are among the most popular immigrants in Germany, they are often poorly integrated and have little contact with Germans. However, since the reporting of failed integration in the media and measures to promote integration are mostly limited to immigrants from muslim countries, integration problems and disadvantages, especially in terms of education, are increasingly often not clearly perceived among Italian migrants.

This may also be due to the fact that the Italians, like the other southern Europeans, are comparatively well integrated economically and can successfully compensate for their educational deficits in working life. As a result, people with an Italian migration background almost reach the values of the natives in some labour market indicators. Youth unemployment is even lower than that of the autochthonous Germans. The proportion of those dependent on public services also fell from over eleven to under eight percent between the first and second generation.

Among the German cities Wolfsburg and Ludwigshafen had the highest share of Italian migrants in 2011 according to German Census data.

Number of Italians in larger cities
#	City	People
1.	Berlin	31,573
2.	Munich	28,496
3.	Cologne	21,051
4.	Frankfurt	15,320
5.	Stuttgart	14,021
6.	Mannheim	8,265
7.	Düsseldorf	7,799
8.	Hamburg	7,570
9.	Nuremberg	7,432
10.	Wuppertal	6,870
11.	Ludwigshafen	6,209
12.	Wolfsburg	5,706
13.	Karlsruhe	4,658
14.	Augsburg	4,282
15.	Wiesbaden	4,089
16.	Saarbrücken	4,051
17.	Bonn	3,976
18.	Offenbach	3,919
19.	Mainz	3,875
20.	Hanover	3,386

== Social integration ==
Historically, Italians have had a significant impact on the development of the fine arts in Germany, from the Romanesque and Gothic to contemporary fashion and design. Since the late 1950s, Italians have also had a very large influence on German gastronomy and food culture; many Italian dishes are now everyday dishes in Germany. There have also been acquisitions at the level of popular culture, such as the foundation of the Bensheim Passion or the Stations of the Cross in Saarlouis.

During the 1950s and 1960s, Italian guest workers were often subjected to severe discrimination. Before entering the country, they had to endure sometimes degrading procedures in Italian emigration centres, where they were tested for their ability to work. In Germany, workers were isolated from the local population in cramped barracks, with around four people sharing a 13-square-metre room. In front of some German restaurants there were signs saying "Dogs and Italians not allowed".

However, unlike other large immigrant groups in Germany, relatively few Italians have acquired German citizenship.

According to a study by the weekly Die Zeit, pupils of Italian descent in German schools fare worse than members of other large immigrant groups. According to this, approximately 48% of pupils of Italian origin attend the Hauptschule and 8.6% attend the Sonderschule. Although Italians are among the most popular immigrants in Germany, they are often poorly integrated and have little contact with Germans. However, as reports of lack of integration in the media and measures to promote integration are mostly limited to immigrants of Islamic culture, the problems and disadvantages of integration, especially in terms of education, are often not clearly increasing perceived among Italian migrants.

This may also be due to the fact that Italians, like other Southern Europeans, are relatively well integrated economically and can successfully compensate for their educational deficits in working life. As a result, people with an Italian migration background nearly match native values in some labour market indicators. Youth unemployment is even lower than that of native Germans. The share of employees in public services also fell from over 11% to under 8% between the first and second generations. There are many Italian-German associations scattered throughout the territory, and there is a monthly magazine in Italian language called Corriere d'Italia.

== German stereotypes about Italians ==
Given the differences in culture and mentality between Germans and Italians, the Italian community in Germany has sometimes been the victim of prejudice in the last century.

There are several derogatory terms such as Spaghettifresser, i.e. "spaghetti eaters", Katzelmacher, i.e. "kitty-factory" in reference to the prolificity of some groups of immigrants such as the Italians, Mafiamann, which means mafiosi. Some forms of anti-Italianism were manifested by Germans nostalgic for Nazism who considered Italians "traitors" to the Armistice of Cassibile, and this is also testified by the filing, in 2006, of a criminal case against Ottmar Muhlhauser, a German officer responsible for the shooting of a hundred Italian soldiers in the massacre of the Acqui Division, motivated by the fact that the soldiers killed were traitors.

But even the German mass media have sometimes given a negative image of Italians. In 1977, the cover of the magazine Der Spiegel was entitled Pistole auf spaghetti, which represented an image of a plate of spaghetti with a pistol on it, in reference to the "Years of Lead" which bloodied Italy in that period. Another example of insulting Italians was a 2008 TV spot by the German electronics department store chain Media Markt, which showed an Italian fan named Toni (imitated by the German comedian Olli Dittrich) a "womaniser" and crook with sunglasses and gold chain around the neck. The commercial was subsequently withdrawn.

== Notable people ==
=== Arts & Entertainment ===
- Joseph Ignaz Appiani (1834–1903), painter
- Alexander Calandrelli (1834–1903), sculptor
- Maximilian Dasio, painter
- Bonaventura Genelli, painter
- Janus Genelli, painter
- Luigi Mayer (1755–1803), painter
- Alexander Molinari (1772–1831), painter

==== Film & Television ====
- Mario Adorf, actor
- Gedeon Burkhard, actor
- Roberto Cappelluti, TV presenter
- Tristano Casanova, actor
- Janine Habeck, model
- Hardy Krüger Jr., actor
- Giovanni di Lorenzo, journalist and TV presenter
- Oliver Masucci, actor
- Denis Moschitto, actor
- Krista Posch, actress
- Franka Potente, actress
- Elisabeth Röhm, actress
- Roberto Saccà, actor
- Tonio Selwart (1896–2002), actor
- Chiara Schoras, actress
- Francesco Stefani (1923–1989), TV director
- Lisa Vicari, actress
- Ingo Zamperoni, TV presenter and journalist

==== Music ====
- Nino de Angelo, singer
- Lou Bega, singer
- Ferruccio Busoni, composer, pianist, conductor, editor, writer, and piano teacher
- Mandy Capristo, singer
- Johann Peter Cavallo (1819–1892), pianist
- Franz Danzi (1763–1826), composer & conductor
- Tatjana Gürbaca, opera director
- Daniel Küblböck (1985–2021), singer
- Toni Landomini, rapper, better known as Toni L
- Francesca Lebrun (1756–1791), singer & composer
- Pietro Lombardi, singer
- Sarah Lombardi, singer
- Bruno Maderna, conductor and composer
- Daniele Negroni, singer
- Oonagh, singer
- Nevio Passaro, singer-songwriter
- Mille Petrozza, guitarist & singer
- Raphael Ragucci, rapper, better known as RAF Camora
- Calogero Randazzo, rap music producer, better known as Roey Marquis II.
- Andrea Renzullo, singer
- Roberto Saccà, opera singer
- Conrad Schnitzler (1937–2001), musician
- Daniel Sluga, rap music producer, better known as Fader Gladiator
- Enrico Di Ventura, rapper, better known as Italo Reno
- Giovanni Zarrella, singer and TV presenter

==== Writers ====
- Gisela von Arnim (1827–1889), writer
- Bernard von Brentano (1901–1964), writer & journalist
- Christian Brentano (1784–1851), writer
- Clemens Brentano (1778–1842), poet and novelist
- Hans Carossa (1878–1956), writer
- Ralph Giordano (1923–2014), writer
- Oskar Panizza (1853–1921), writer

=== Business ===
- Daniela Cavallo, business executive
- Johann Maria Farina, perfumier
- Friedrich Grillo, businessman
- Gaetano Medini, chef
- Joseph Anton von Maffei, industrialist
- Henriette Wegner, philanthropist
- Astor family

=== Military ===
- Albrecht Brandi (1914–1966), naval commander
- Wilhelm Canaris (1887–1945), admiral
- Wilhelm Crisolli (1895–1944), general

=== Politics & Law ===
- Heinrich von Brentano (1904–1964), politician
- Lars Castellucci, politician
- Udo Di Fabio, legal scholar & judge
- Manuel Gava, politician
- Victor Perli, politician
- Fabio De Masi, politician
- Thilo Sarrazin, politician
- Tino Schwierzina, politician
- Anne Spiegel, politician
- Jessica Tatti, politician
- Bruno Tesch (1913–1933), antifascist
- Leo von Caprivi, general and statesman
- Stella Merendino, member of the Left Party and was elected to the Bundestag in the 2025 German federal election

=== Science ===
- Johannes Agnoli (1925–2003), political scientist
- Bernhard Bolzano, mathematician, logician, philosopher, theologian and Catholic priest
- Franz Brentano, philosopher & psychologist
- Lujo Brentano, economist
- Angela D. Friederici, linguist & neuropsychologist
- Vittorio Hösle, philosopher
- Romano Guardini, Catholic priest, author, and academic
- Rocco Guerrini (1525–1596), military engineer
- Marcello Pirani, scientist
- Philipp J. J. Valentini, explorer & archaeologist

=== Sports ===
- Marco Baldi, basketball player and manager
- Rudolf Caracciola, racing driver
- Stefano Caruso, ice dancer
- Johnny Cecotto Jr., racing driver
- Sandro Cortese, motorcycle racer
- Marcello Craca, tennis player
- Laura Dell'Angelo, tennis player
- Matthias de Zordo, javelin thrower
- Cathleen Martini, bobsledder
- Alexandra Mazzucco, handball player
- Pasquale Passarelli, wrestler
- Graciano Rocchigiani, boxer
- Ralf Rocchigiani, boxer
- Giovanna Scoccimarro, judoka
- Lorenzo Suding, mountain bike racer
- Christian Thun, boxer

==== Football players ====
- Alessandro Abruscia
- Domenico Alberico
- Sergio Allievi
- Marcos Álvarez
- Marcel Appiah
- Angelo Barletta
- Mirko Baschetti
- Frank Benatelli
- Rico Benatelli
- Christian Brucia
- Marco Calamita
- Daniel Caligiuri
- Marco Caligiuri
- Pietro Callea
- Giovanni Cannata
- Massimo Cannizzaro
- Guerino Capretti
- Giuseppe Catizone
- Stefano Celozzi
- Fabio Chiarodia
- Stefano Cincotta
- Diego Contento
- Cataldo Cozza
- Davis Curiale
- Diego Demme
- Giovanni Federico
- Marco Fiore
- Antonio Fischer
- Roberto Floriano
- Franco Foda
- Sandro Foda
- Dario Fossi
- Patrizio Frau
- Francesco Di Frisco
- Daniele Gabriele
- Salvatore Gambino
- Martino Gatti
- Gianluca Gaudino
- Maurizio Gaudino
- Giuseppe Gemiti
- Baldo di Gregorio
- Vincenzo Grifo
- Adriano Grimaldi
- Angelo Hauk
- Fabrizio Hayer
- Fabio Kaufmann
- Gianluca Korte
- Raffael Korte
- Bruno Labbadia
- Davide Leikauf
- Giuseppe Leo
- Michele Lepore
- Gino Lettieri
- Mattia Maggio
- Gaetano Manno
- Vincenzo Marchese
- Stefano Marino
- Luca Marseiler
- Gianluca Marzullo
- Roberto Massimo
- Lukas Mazagg
- Fabian Messina
- Fabio Di Michele Sanchez
- Giuliano Modica
- Riccardo Montolivo
- Fabio Morena
- Toni Musto
- Benedetto Muzzicato
- Oliver Neuville
- Massimo Ornatelli
- Silvio Pagano
- Vincenzo Palumbo
- Antonio Pangallo
- Raoul Petretta
- Franco Petruso
- Marco Pezzaiuoli
- Kevin Pezzoni
- Giuseppe Pisano
- Gustav Policella
- Massimilian Porcello
- Leandro Putaro
- Giuseppe Reina
- Giuseppe Ricciardi
- Michele Rizzi
- Calogero Rizzuto
- Stefano Russo
- Antonio Di Salvo
- Nicola Sansone
- Flavio Santoro
- Domenico Sbordone
- Gian Luca Schulz
- Nico Schulz
- Yomi Scintu
- Maurizio Scioscia
- Sandro Sirigu
- Elia Soriano
- Roberto Soriano
- Giovanni Speranza
- Domenico Tedesco
- Mike Terranova
- Marco Terrazzino
- Raffael Tonello
- Fabio Torsiello
- Nicolò Tresoldi
- Mattia Trianni
- Camillo Ugi
- Angelo Vaccaro
- Enrico Valentini
- Felice Vecchione
- Luciano Velardi
- Maurizio Vella
- Marco Villa
- Fabio Viteritti

== See also ==
- Germany–Italy relations
- Italian diaspora
- Immigration to Germany

== Bibliography ==
- Johannes Augel, Italienische Einwanderung und Wirtschaftstätigkeit in rheinischen Städten des 17. und 18. Jahrhunderts, Bonn, L. Röhrscheid, 1971.
- Gustavo Corni, Christof Dipper (eds), Italiani in Germania tra Ottocento e Novecento: spostamenti, rapporti, immagini, influenze, Bologna, Il Mulino, 2006, ISBN 88-15-10731-2.
- Marco Fincardi, Emigranti a passo romano: operai dell'Alto Veneto e Friuli nella Germania hitleriana, Verona, Cierre, 2002, ISBN 88-8314-179-2.
- Malte König, Racism within the Axis: Sexual Intercourse and Marriage Plans between Italians and Germans, 1940–3, in: Journal of Contemporary History 54.3, 2019, pp. 508–526.
- Brunello Mantelli, Camerati del lavoro. I lavoratori emigrati nel Terzo Reich nel periodo dell'Asse 1938-1943, Scandicci, La Nuova Italia, 1992.
- Claudia Martini, Italienische Migranten in Deutschland: transnationale Diskurse, Hamburg, D. Reimer, 2001, ISBN 3-496-02496-8.
- Edith Pichler, Ethnic economics: the Italian entrepreneurs in Germany, in: Chiapparino, F. (ed.), The Alien Entrepreneur, Milano, 2011, pp. 54–82.
- Edith Pichler, 50 anni di immigrazione italiana in Germania: transitori, inclusi/esclusi o cittadini europei?, in: Altreitalie, International journal of studies on Italian migrations in the world, Nr. 33, pp. 6–18. Torino, 2006.
- Edith, Pichler, Junge Italiener zwischen Inklusion und Exklusion. Eine Fallstudie. Berlin, 2010.
- Edith, Pichler, Dai vecchi pionieri alla nuova mobilità. Italiani a Berlino tra inclusione ed esclusione, in: De Salvo, E./Ugolini, G./Priori, L. (eds), Italo-Berliner. Gli italiani che cambiano la capitale tedesca, Milano-Udine, Mimesis, 2014.
