= 2024–25 SV Darmstadt 98 season =

SV Darmstadt 98
2024–25 season
- Manager: Torsten Lieberknecht (until 1 September); Florian Kohfeldt (from 7 September)
- Stadium: Merck-Stadion am Böllenfalltor
- 2. Bundesliga: 12th
- DFB-Pokal: Round of 16
- Top goalscorer: League: Isac Lidberg (14); All: Isac Lidberg (15)
Home colours	Away colours	Third colours

The 2024–25 season will be the 127th season in the history of SV Darmstadt 98 and the second consecutive season in 2. Bundesliga. In addition to the domestic league, the team is scheduled to participate in the DFB-Pokal.

== Transfers ==
=== In ===
Pos.	Player	Transferred from	Fee	Date	Source
FW	(France) Killian Corredor	(France) Rodez AF	Undisclosed	15 August 2024	
FW	(Sweden) Isac Lidberg	(Netherlands) FC Utrecht	€1,000,000	16 August 2024	
DF	(Spain) Guille Bueno	(Germany) Borussia Dortmund II	Loan	22 August 2024	
MF	(Germany) Philipp Förster	Unattached	Free	23 September 2024	
DF	(Germany) Marco Thiede	Unattached	Free	24 September 2024	

=== Out ===
Pos.	Player	Transferred to	Fee	Date	Source
FW	(Germany) Luca Pfeiffer	(Germany) VfB Stuttgart	Loan return	30 June 2024	
MF	(Croatia) Bartol Franjić	(Germany) VfL Wolfsburg	Loan return	30 June 2024	
MF	(Germany) Tim Skarke	(Germany) Union Berlin	Loan return	30 June 2024	
MF	(Philippines) Gerrit Holtmann	(Germany) VfL Bochum	Loan return	30 June 2024	
MF	(Germany) Julian Justvan	(Germany) TSG Hoffenheim	Loan return	30 June 2024	
FW	(Germany) Henry Crosthwaite	(Germany) BFC Dynamo	End of contract	1 July 2024	
MF	(Albania) Klaus Gjasula	Re-signed for Darmstadt	End of contract	1 July 2024	
MF	(Germany) Mathias Honsak	(Germany) 1. FC Heidenheim	End of contract	1 July 2024	
MF	(Ghana) Braydon Manu	(Netherlands) PEC Zwolle	End of contract	1 July 2024	
DF	(Bosnia and Herzegovina) Emir Karić	(Austria) Sturm Graz	End of contract	1 July 2024	
DF	(Sweden) Thomas Isherwood	(Sweden) AIK	End of contract	1 July 2024	
GK	(Germany) Morten Behrens	(Germany) Preußen Münster	End of contract	1 July 2024	
FW	(Germany) Aaron Seydel		End of contract	1 July 2024	
MF	(Germany) Fabian Schnellhardt		End of contract	1 July 2024	
DF	(Germany) Jannik Müller		End of contract	1 July 2024	
DF	(Austria) Christoph Klarer	(England) Birmingham City	Undisclosed	20 July 2024	

== Friendlies ==
=== Pre-season ===
29 June 2024 Friendly	SpVgg Hainstadt (Germany)	0–16	(Germany) Darmstadt 98
13:00

3 July 2024 Friendly	SV Beerfelden (Germany)	0–24	(Germany) Darmstadt 98
18:30

6 July 2024 Friendly	SV Münster (Germany)	1–8	(Germany) Darmstadt 98
13:00

10 July 2024 Friendly	FSV Frankfurt (Germany)	1–0	(Germany) Darmstadt 98	Frankfurt
19:00				Stadium: PSD Bank Arena

13 July 2024 Friendly	Darmstadt 98 (Germany)	5–1	(Luxembourg) Swift Hesperange	Darmstadt
16:00				Stadium: Merck-Stadion am Böllenfalltor

20 July 2024 Friendly	Darmstadt 98 (Germany)	1–2	(Germany) 1. FC Saarbrücken
13:00	7'		4'; 28'

27 July 2024 Friendly	Darmstadt 98 (Germany)	2–0	(England) Coventry City
13:30

=== Mid-season ===
4 September 2024 Friendly	Mainz 05 (Germany)	0–1	(Germany) Darmstadt 98
14:00

11 January 2025 Friendly	Darmstadt 98 (Germany)	1–0	(Switzerland) St. Gallen
13:00

== Competitions ==
=== Overall record ===
Competition	First match	Last match	Starting round	Record							
Competition	First match	Last match	Starting round	Pld	W	D	L	GF	GA	GD	Win %
2. Bundesliga	4 August 2024	18 May 2025	Matchday 1	34	11	9	14	56	55	+1	32.35
DFB-Pokal	18 August 2024	3 December 2024	First round	3	2	0	1	5	3	+2	66.67
Total				37	13	9	15	61	58	+3	35.14

Last updated: 16 March 2025
Source: Competitions

=== 2. Bundesliga ===
==== League table ====
Pos	Team	Pld	W	D	L	GF	GA	GD	Pts
10	1. FC Nürnberg	34	14	6	14	60	57	+3	48
11	Hertha BSC	34	12	8	14	49	51	−2	44
12	Darmstadt 98	34	11	9	14	56	55	+1	42
13	Greuther Fürth	34	10	9	15	45	59	−14	39
14	Schalke 04	34	10	8	16	52	62	−10	38

Source: Bundesliga
Rules for classification: 1) Points; 2) Goal difference; 3) Goals scored; 4) Head-to-head results; 5) Head-to-head away goals scored; 6) Away goals scored; 7) Play-off.
(Rules 4–6 only apply after home and away matches have been played between the tied teams.)

==== Results summary ====
Overall								Home						Away					
Pld	W	D	L	GF	GA	GD	Pts	W	D	L	GF	GA	GD	W	D	L	GF	GA	GD
34	11	9	14	56	55	+1	42	8	4	5	29	20	+9	3	5	9	27	35	−8

Last updated: 16 March 2025.

==== Results by round ====
Round	1	2	3	4	5	6	7	8	9	10	11	12	13	14	15	16	17	18	19	20	21	22	23	24	25	26	27	28	29	30	31	32	33	34
Ground	H	A	H	A	H	A	H	A	H	H	A	H	A	H	A	H	A	A	H	A	H	A	H	A	H	A	A	H	A	H	A	H	A	H
Result	L	L	D	L	D	W	L	D	W	D	W	W	W	D	D	W	L	D	L	L	L	L	W	L	W	L	L	W	D	W	D	L	L	W
Position	16	17	16	17	16	14	16	16	13	13	12	12	10	11	10	10	10	10	10	11	12	13	12	13	13	13	14	13	13	12	12	12	12	12
Points	0	0	1	1	2	5	5	6	9	10	13	16	19	20	21	24	24	25	25	25	25	25	28	28	31	31	31	34	35	38	39	39	39	42

Updated to match(es) played on 18 May 2025. Source:
A = Away; H = Home; W = Win; D = Draw; L = Loss

== Matches ==
4 August 2024 Matchday 1	SV Darmstadt 98	0–2	Fortuna Düsseldorf	Darmstadt
13:30 CEST (UTC+2)	Nürnberger (yellow card) 54'; Vukotić (yellow card) 78'; El Idrissi (red card) 83'	Report	Vukotić 55' (o.g.); Hoffmann (yellow card) 80'; Jóhannesson (yellow card) 81'; Rossmann 86'	Stadium: Merck-Stadion am Böllenfalltor; Attendance: 17,810; Referee: Robert Kampka

11 August 2024 Matchday 2	SC Paderborn 07	3–1	SV Darmstadt 98	Paderborn
13:30 CEST (UTC+2)	Musliu (yellow card) 10'; Klaas 53'; Bilbija 64'; Ansah 83'	Report	Vilhelmsson 7'; Bader (yellow card) 46'	Stadium: Home Deluxe Arena; Attendance: 12,972; Referee: Patrick Schwengers

25 August 2024 Matchday 3	SV Darmstadt 98	1–1	1. FC Nürnberg	Darmstadt
13:30 CEST (UTC+2)	Vukotić (yellow card) 10'; Lidberg 23'; Nürnberger (yellow card) 41'	Report	Castrop (yellow card) 51'; Ševčík 62' (yellow card) 83'; Flick (yellow card) 75'	Stadium: Merck-Stadion am Böllenfalltor; Attendance: 17,600; Referee: Max Burda

31 August 2024 Matchday 4	SV Elversberg	4–0	SV Darmstadt 98	Elversberg
13:00 CEST (UTC+2)	Schnellbacher 5'; Asllani 20', 59'; Fellhauer (yellow card) 45'; Damar (yellow card) 58'; Gerezgiher 90'	Report	Müller (yellow card) 33'; Vukotić (yellow card) 45+3'; Maglica (yellow card) 90+25'	Stadium: URSAPHARM-Arena an der Kaiserlinde; Attendance: 9,443; Referee: Lukas Benen

14 September 2024 Matchday 5	SV Darmstadt 98	1–1	Eintracht Braunschweig	Darmstadt
13:00 CEST (UTC+2)	López 29'; Klefisch (yellow card) 90+7'	Report	Köhler (yellow card) 5'; Jaeckel (yellow card) 9'; Scherning (red card) 30'; Kaufmann (yellow card) 45+1'; Rittmüller (yellow card) 45+5'; Szabó 86'; Marie (yellow card) 90+2'; Bell Bell (yellow card) 90+7'; Conteh (yellow card) 90+7'	Stadium: Merck-Stadion am Böllenfalltor; Attendance: 17,076; Referee: Felix Prigan

20 September 2024 Matchday 6	Schalke 04	5–3	SV Darmstadt 98	Gelsenkirchen
18:30 CEST (UTC+2)	Mohr 14'; Sylla 34'; Schallenberg 39'; Kamiński (yellow card) 46'; Aydın (yellow card) 48'; Karaman (yellow card) 65'; Murkin (yellow card) 83'	Report	Bueno (yellow card) 9'; Vukotić (yellow card) 12'; Corredor (yellow card) 44'; Hornby 45+5' (pen.); Marseiler (yellow card) 52'; Lidberg 56', 76', 87'; Kempe (yellow card) 90+1'; López (yellow card) 90+3' (goal) 90+7'; Gjasula (yellow card) 90+3'	Stadium: Veltins-Arena; Attendance: 61,021; Referee: Florian Heft

28 September 2024 Matchday 7	SV Darmstadt 98	1–2	1. FC Magdeburg	Darmstadt
13:00 CEST (UTC+2)	Lidberg 11'; Müller (yellow card) 17'; Klefisch (yellow card) 66'; Kempe (yellow card) 90+4'; Förster (yellow card) 90+5'	Report	Burcu 22'; Mathisen (yellow card) 41' (yellow-red card) 73'; Krempicki 48'; Hugonet (yellow card) 66'; Nollenberger (yellow card) 70'; Itō (yellow card) 82'	Stadium: Merck-Stadion am Böllenfalltor; Attendance: 17,311; Referee: Michael Bacher

4 October 2024 Matchday 8	Karlsruher SC	3–3	SV Darmstadt 98	Karlsruhe
18:30 CEST (UTC+2)	Burnić (yellow card) 6' (goal) 11'; Jensen 28' (yellow card) 71'; Kobald (yellow card) 69'; Hunziker (yellow card) 82'	Report	Lidberg 15'; Kohfeldt (yellow card) 45+2'; Klefisch 54'; Vukotić 54'; Riedel (yellow card) 88'	Stadium: BBBank Wildpark; Attendance: 31,034; Referee: Florian Lechner

18 October 2024 Matchday 9	SV Darmstadt 98	5–1	1. FC Köln	Darmstadt
18:30 CEST (UTC+2)	Fraser Hornby 11', 40'; Isac Lidberg (yellow card) 41' (goal) 54'; Philipp Förster 65'; Oscar Vilhelmsson (yellow card) 90'; Aleksandar Vukotić 90+4'	Report	Tim Lemperle 38' (yellow card) 46'; Dominique Heintz (yellow card) 90+2'; Timo Hübers (yellow card) 90+3'	Stadium: Merck-Stadion am Böllenfalltor; Attendance: 17,810; Referee: Frank Willenborg

27 October 2024 Matchday 10	SV Darmstadt 98	1–1	SSV Ulm 1846	Darmstadt
13:30 CET (UTC+1)	Hornby 16' (yellow card) 30'; Vukotić (yellow card) 60'	Report	Keller 18'; Chessa (yellow card) 62'; Rösch (yellow card) 70'; Brandt (yellow card) 80'	Stadium: Merck-Stadion am Böllenfalltor; Attendance: 17,455; Referee: Sören Storks

2 November 2024 Matchday 11	SpVgg Greuther Fürth	1–5	SV Darmstadt 98	Fürth
13:00 CET (UTC+1)	Futkeu (yellow card) 49'; Hrgota 90'	Report	Förster 30'; Lakenmacher 40'; Lidberg 45+3'; Corredor 51'; López 77'	Stadium: Sportpark Ronhof Thomas Sommer; Attendance: 11,161; Referee: Max Burda

9 November 2024 Matchday 12	SV Darmstadt 98	3–1	Hertha BSC	Darmstadt
13:30 CET (UTC+1)	Lakenmacher (yellow card) 20'; López (yellow card) 29'; Klefisch (yellow card) 37'; Förster 45+2'; Nürnberger (yellow card) 50'; Vukotić (yellow card) 52'; Lidberg 65'; Müller 81'	Report	Niederlechner 21'; Kenny (yellow card) 23'; Maza (yellow card) 44'; Cuisance (yellow card) 87'	Stadium: Merck-Stadion am Böllenfalltor; Attendance: 17,810; Referee: Patrick Alt

23 November 2024 Matchday 13	Hannover 96	1–2	SV Darmstadt 98	Hannover
13:00 CET (UTC+1)	Lee 68'; Ngankam (yellow card) 71'	Report	Förster 62'; Klefisch (yellow card) 71'; Nürnberger 72' (yellow card) 82'; Papela (yellow card) 78'	Stadium: Heinz von Heiden Arena; Attendance: 31,500; Referee: Michael Bacher

30 November 2024 Matchday 14	SV Darmstadt 98	0–0	Preußen Münster	Darmstadt
13:00 CET (UTC+1)	Riedel (yellow card) 25'; Förster (yellow card) 38'; Corredor (yellow card) 61'	Report	Preißinger (yellow card) 34'; Mees (yellow card) 45'; Koulis (yellow card) 61'; Kirkeskov (yellow card) 70'	Stadium: Merck-Stadion am Böllenfalltor; Attendance: 17,569; Referee: Tobias Welz

8 December 2024 Matchday 15	Hamburger SV	2–2	SV Darmstadt 98	Hamburg
13:30 CET (UTC+1)	Königsdörffer 10'; Karabec 45'; Poręba (yellow card) 81'; Elfadli (yellow card) 88'	Report	Förster (yellow card) 31'; Vukotić 33'; Hornby (yellow card) 45+1'; Corredor 63'	Stadium: Volksparkstadion; Attendance: 51,606; Referee: Eric-Dominic Weisbach

14 December 2024 Matchday 16	SV Darmstadt 98	5–1	1. FC Kaiserslautern	Darmstadt
18:30 CET (UTC+1)	López (yellow card) 22'; Corredor 33', 88'; Hornby 45+2', 73'; Marseiler 62'	Report	Ritter (yellow card) 63'; Tomiak (yellow card) 72'; Hanslik 84'	Stadium: Merck-Stadion am Böllenfalltor; Attendance: 17,810; Referee: Florian Lechner

22 December 2024 Matchday 17	Jahn Regensburg	2–1	SV Darmstadt 98	Regensburg
13:30 CET (UTC+1)	Huth (yellow card) 63'; Pröger 65' (yellow card) 90+4'; Ganaus 90+1' (yellow card) 90+2'; Gebhardt (yellow card) 90+6'; Kieffer (yellow card) 90+7'	Report	Hornby (yellow card) 29'; Vukotić (yellow card) 44'; Klefisch 90+3'	Stadium: Jahnstadion Regensburg; Attendance: 10,008; Referee: Tom Bauer

17 January 2025 Matchday 18	Fortuna Düsseldorf	2–2	SV Darmstadt 98	Düsseldorf
18:30 CET (UTC+1)	Haag (yellow card) 20' (goal) 61'; van Brederode 41'; Friðriksson (yellow card) 76'; Kownacki (yellow card) 85'; Oberdorf (yellow card) 90+3'	Report	Müller (yellow card) 66'; Corredor 69' (pen.), 72'	Stadium: Merkur Spiel-Arena; Attendance: 51,200; Referee: Robert Kampka

26 January 2025 Matchday 19	SV Darmstadt 98	0–1	SC Paderborn 07	Darmstadt
13:30 CET (UTC+1)	Riedel (yellow card) 45+2'; Maglica (yellow card) 86'	Report	Terho (yellow card) 8'; Götze (yellow card) 25'; Mehlem (yellow card) 31'; Platte (yellow card) 35' (goal) 37'; Michel (yellow card) 73'; Hoffmeier (yellow card) 85'	Stadium: Merck-Stadion am Böllenfalltor; Attendance: 16,951; Referee: Martin Petersen

31 January 2025 Matchday 20	1. FC Nürnberg	1–0	SV Darmstadt 98	Nuremberg
18:30 CET (UTC+1)	Jeltsch (yellow card) 40'; Drexler 85'; Emreli (yellow card) 90'; Justvan (yellow card) 90+3'	Report	Förster (yellow card) 43'	Stadium: Max-Morlock-Stadion; Attendance: 25,968; Referee: Daniel Siebert

8 February 2025 Matchday 21	SV Darmstadt 98	0–3	SV Elversberg	Darmstadt
13:00 CET (UTC+1)	Vukotić (yellow card) 45+1'; Lidberg (yellow card) 70'; Nürnberger (red card) 76'	Report	Fellhauer 12'; Pinckert (yellow card) 30'; Neubauer 42'; Petkov (yellow card) 44'; Asllani 64'; Rohr (yellow card) 77'	Stadium: Merck-Stadion am Böllenfalltor; Attendance: 16,855; Referee: Lukas Benen

15 February 2025 Matchday 22	Eintracht Braunschweig	1–0	SV Darmstadt 98	Braunschweig
13:00 CET (UTC+1)	Tempelmann (yellow card) 45' (goal) 61'; Baas (yellow card) 86'; Di Michele (yellow card) 90+2'	Report	Thiede (yellow card) 14'; Papela (yellow card) 43'; Boëtius (yellow card) 45+1' (yellow-red card) 62'; Riedel (yellow card) 90+4'; Maglica (yellow card) 90+4'; Schuhen (yellow card) 90+6'	Stadium: Eintracht-Stadion; Attendance: 18,714; Referee: Max Burda

23 February 2025 Matchday 23	SV Darmstadt 98	2–0	Schalke 04	Darmstadt
13:30 CET (UTC+1)	Lidberg 3', 5'; Corredor (yellow card) 55'; Riedel (yellow card) 62'; Papela (yellow card) 75'; Hornby (yellow card) 84'	Report	Barkok (yellow card) 11'; Grüger (yellow card) 53' (yellow-red card) 76'; Schallenberg (yellow card) 62'; Antwi-Adjej (yellow card) 67'	Stadium: Merck-Stadion am Böllenfalltor; Attendance: 17,810; Referee: Nicolas Winter

2 March 2025 Matchday 24	1. FC Magdeburg	4–1	SV Darmstadt 98	Magdeburg
13:30 CET (UTC+1)	Mathisen (yellow card) 36'; Amaechi 56'; El-Zein 78'; Kaars 81'	Report	Boëtius (yellow card) 23'; Maglica (yellow card) 28'; Hornby 29'; Lidberg (yellow card) 45+3'; Kempe (yellow card) 76'	Stadium: Avnet Arena; Attendance: 22,430; Referee: Patrick Alt

7 March 2025 Matchday 25	SV Darmstadt 98	3–0	Karlsruher SC	Darmstadt
18:30 CET (UTC+1)	Lidberg 10'; Corredor 73'; Papela 79'	Report	Rapp (yellow card) 30'; Beifus (yellow card) 50'	Stadium: Merck-Stadion am Böllenfalltor; Attendance: 17,810; Referee: Felix Prigan

15 March 2025 Matchday 26	1. FC Köln	2–1	SV Darmstadt 98	Cologne
18:30 CET (UTC+1)	Thielmann 1'; Ljubičić (yellow card) 67'; Waldschmidt 80' (pen.)	Report	Hornby 25' (pen.) (yellow card) 59' (yellow-red card) 66'; Boëtius (yellow card) 90+9'	Stadium: RheinEnergieStadion; Attendance: 50,000; Referee: Florian Heft

28 March 2025 Matchday 27	SSV Ulm 1846	2–1	SV Darmstadt 98	Ulm
18:30 CET (UTC+1)	Röser 50'; Batista Meier 57'; Keller (yellow card) 70'; Hyryläinen (yellow card) 77'; Higl (yellow card) 88'; Kahvić (yellow card) 90+2'; Thiede (yellow card) 90+4'	Report	Papela (yellow card) 63'; Riedel 68'	Stadium: Donaustadion; Attendance: 15,271; Referee: Robert Kampka

5 April 2025 Matchday 28	SV Darmstadt 98	1–0	SpVgg Greuther Fürth	Darmstadt
13:00 CEST (UTC+2)	Lidberg 79'	Report	Loosli (yellow card) 85'	Stadium: Merck-Stadion am Böllenfalltor; Attendance: 16,820; Referee: Lars Erbst

12 April 2025 Matchday 29	Hertha BSC	1–1	SV Darmstadt 98	Berlin
13:00 CEST (UTC+2)	Vukotić 62' (o.g.); Demme (yellow card) 71'; Maza (yellow card) 90+3'	Report	Corredor (yellow card) 25'; Förster (yellow card) 31'; Lidberg 48'; Riedel (yellow card) 78'	Stadium: Olympiastadion (Berlin); Attendance: 46,763; Referee: Timo Gansloweit

20 April 2025 Matchday 30	SV Darmstadt 98	3–1	Hannover 96	Darmstadt
13:30 CEST (UTC+2)	Hornby 1', 90+3'; Papela (yellow card) 65'; Riedel (yellow card) 67'; Corredor 83'	Report	Muroya (yellow card) 25'; Kunze (yellow card) 51'; Halstenberg (yellow card) 55'; Voglsammer 82'; Zieler (yellow card) 90+1'	Stadium: Merck-Stadion am Böllenfalltor; Attendance: 17,810; Referee: Max Burda

26 April 2025 Matchday 31	Preußen Münster	1–1	SV Darmstadt 98	Münster
13:00 CEST (UTC+2)	Frenkert (yellow card) 1'; Mees 63' (yellow card) 90+2'; Friðjónsson (yellow card) 90+5'	Report	Riedel (yellow card) 7'; Marseiler 45+1'; López (yellow card) 45+3'; Müller (yellow card) 70'	Stadium: Preußenstadion; Attendance: 12,422; Referee: Lukas Benen

3 May 2025 Matchday 32	SV Darmstadt 98	0–4	Hamburger SV	Darmstadt
13:00 CEST (UTC+2)	Förster (yellow card) 15'; Vukotić (yellow card) 60'; Müller (yellow card) 69'	Report	Reis 23'; Königsdörffer 58'; Selke (yellow card) 60' (goal) 80'; Schonlau (yellow card) 75'; Meffert (yellow card) 77'; Glatzel 90+5'	Stadium: Merck-Stadion am Böllenfalltor; Attendance: 17,810; Referee: Patrick Alt

11 May 2025 Matchday 33	1. FC Kaiserslautern	2–1	SV Darmstadt 98	Kaiserslautern
13:30 CEST (UTC+2)	Ritter 15' (pen.) (yellow card) 45+3'; Ache 45+7'; Redondo (yellow card) 88'	Report	Marseiler 3'; Schuhen (yellow card) 45+7'; Riedel (yellow card) 47'; Maglica (yellow card) 62'	Stadium: Fritz-Walter-Stadion; Attendance: 49,088; Referee: Robin Braun

18 May 2025 Matchday 34	SV Darmstadt 98	3–1	Jahn Regensburg	Darmstadt
15:30 CEST (UTC+2)	Müller (yellow card) 38' (goal) 90+4'; Hornby 57', 64'; Vukotić (yellow card) 81'	Report	Wurm 8'	Stadium: Merck-Stadion am Böllenfalltor; Attendance: 16,966; Referee: Nicolas Winter

=== DFB-Pokal ===
18 August 2024 First round	Teutonia Ottensen	1–3	Darmstadt 98	Hamburg
15:30 UTC+2	Stark 49'	Report	Klefisch 19'; Nürnberger 28' (pen.); Vilhelmsson 62'	Stadium: Millerntor-Stadion; Attendance: 6,487; Referee: Florian Lechner

30 October 2024 Second round	Dynamo Dresden	2–3 (a.e.t.)	Darmstadt 98	Dresden
20:45 UTC+1	Lemmer 84', 90+11'	Report	Vukotić 56'; Kempe 90+2' (pen.); Lidberg 98'	Stadium: Rudolf-Harbig-Stadion; Attendance: 30,070; Referee: Tobias Stieler

3 December 2024 Round of 16	Werder Bremen	1–0	Darmstadt 98	Bremen
20:45 UTC+1	Jung 90+4'	Report		Stadium: Weserstadion; Attendance: 40,000; Referee: Martin Petersen
