= Cannata =

Cannata is an Italian surname. Notable people with the surname include:

- Giovanni Cannata (born 1985), Italian-German footballer
- Jeff Cannata, American musician
- Joe Cannata (born 1990), American ice hockey player
- Loredana Cannata (born 1975), Italian actress
- Richie Cannata, American musician and music producer
