= Marcel Reichwein =

German footballer

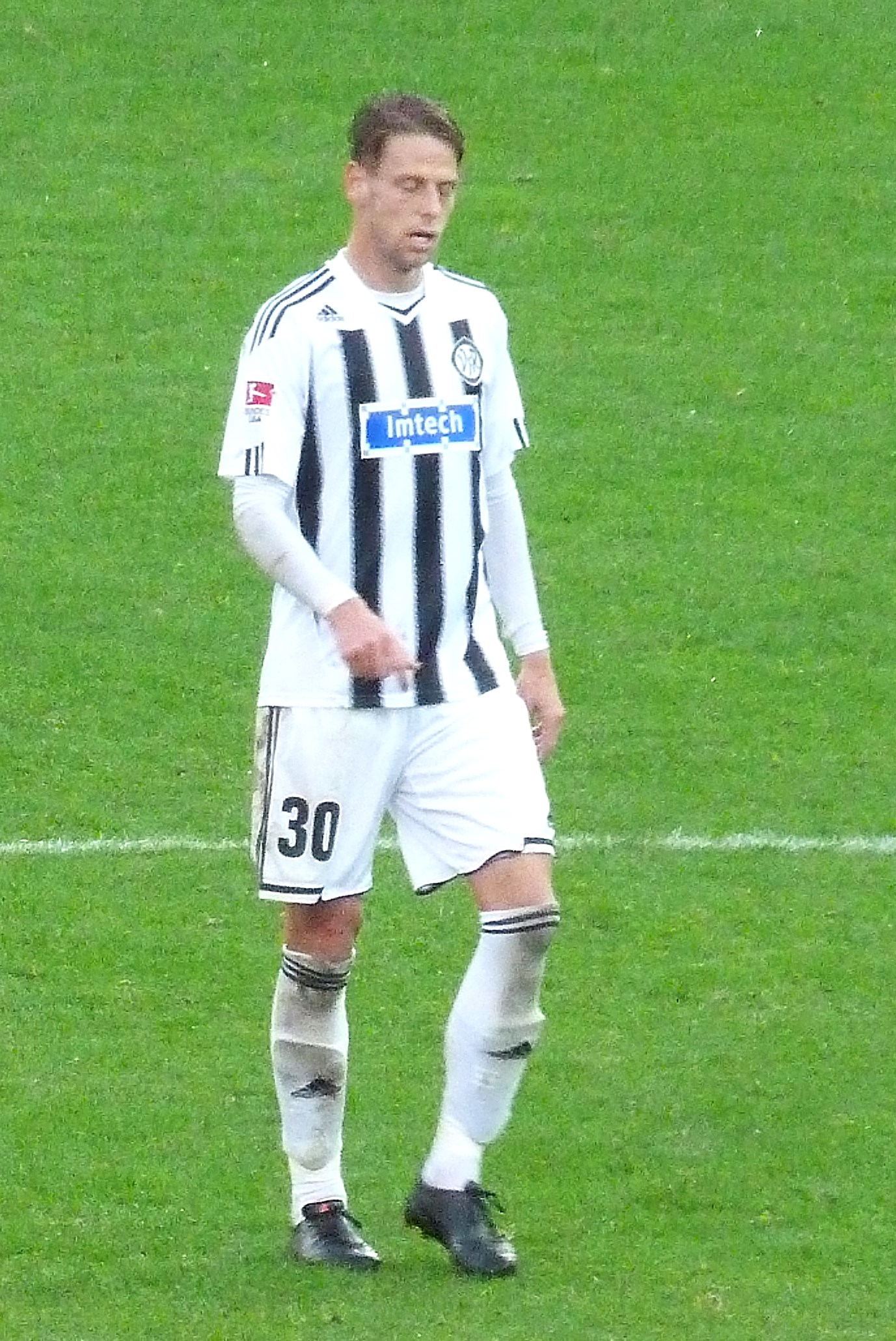
- Reichwein in 2012

Personal information
- Date of birth: 21 February 1986 (age 40)
- Place of birth: Hadamar, West Germany
- Height: 1.90 m (6 ft 3 in)
- Position: Forward

Youth career
- Sportfreunde Eisbachtal
- –2005: Bayer Leverkusen

Senior career*
Years	Team	Apps	(Gls)
2005–2006	Bayer Leverkusen II	30	(4)
2006–2009	Wuppertaler SV Borussia	48	(8)
2007–2008	→ Kickers Emden (loan)	30	(10)
2009–2010	Rot-Weiss Ahlen	14	(2)
2010	Jahn Regensburg	18	(5)
2010–2012	Rot-Weiß Erfurt	73	(29)
2012–2014	VfR Aalen	50	(7)
2014–2016	Preußen Münster	66	(18)
2016–2017	VfL Wolfsburg II	31	(17)
2017–2019	KFC Uerdingen 05	26	(5)
2019	TSV Steinbach	11	(0)
2019–2020	Holzwickeder SC	18	(9)
Total		415	(114)
- * Club domestic league appearances and goals

Marcel Reichwein (born 21 February 1986) is a German former professional footballer who played as a forward.

== Career ==
Reichwein began his career with Bayer Leverkusen, and made his debut (and scored) for the reserve team as a substitute for Giovanni Cannata in a 3–2 defeat to Chemnitzer FC at the beginning of the 2005–06 season. He signed for Wuppertaler SV aged 20, and remained with the club for three years, although the middle season was spent on loan at Kickers Emden. He then spent the first half of the 2009–10 season in the 2. Bundesliga with Rot-Weiss Ahlen, and the second with Jahn Regensburg in the 3. Liga. In July 2010 he signed for Rot-Weiß Erfurt, where he spent two successful seasons, the second saw him finish as the 3. Liga top scorer with 17 goals, taking his total at this level to 41, then a record. He then signed for VfR Aalen, who had won promotion to the 2. Bundesliga. Two years later, he signed for Preußen Münster.
