= Pagano =

Pagano may refer to:

- Pagano (surname), including a list of people with the name
- Pagano (Milan Metro), a rapid transit stop in Milan, Italy
- A kit car originally designed by Ockelbo-Lundgren
- Pagano (wrestler), Mexican professional wrestler
- Pagano della Torre (d. 1365), patriarch of Aquileia
