= Pagano (surname) =

Pagano is an Italian surname. Notable people with the name include:

- A. J. Pagano (fl. 1984–1988), American college football player
- Bartolomeo Pagano (1878–1947), Italian motion picture actor
- Biagio Pagano (born 1983), Italian footballer
- Cesare Pagano (born 1969), Italian Camorrista (mobster)
- Chuck Pagano (born 1960), American football coach
- Chuck Pagano (ESPN), American business executive
- Daniel Pagano (born 1953), American mobster
- Darlene Pagano, American lesbian feminist activist
- Ernest Pagano (1901–1953), American screenwriter
- Francesco Mario Pagano (1748–1799), Italian author and jurist
- Giuseppe Pagano (1896–1945), Italian architect
- John Pagano (born 1967), American football coach
- Linda Pagano (1957–1974/75), American murder victim
- Lindsay Pagano (born 1986), American singer
- Luca Pagano (born 1978), Italian poker player
- Lucas Rodriguez Pagano (born 1980), Argentine footballer
- Michele Pagano (painter) (1697–1732), Italian painter
- Michele Pagano (biochemist), biochemist and cancer biologist
- Nazario Pagano (born 1957), Italian politician
- Sarah Pagano (born 1991), American long distance runner
- Silvio Pagano (born 1985), Italian-German footballer
- Ugo Pagano (born 1951), Italian economist and professor
