= Marcel Schuhen =

German footballer

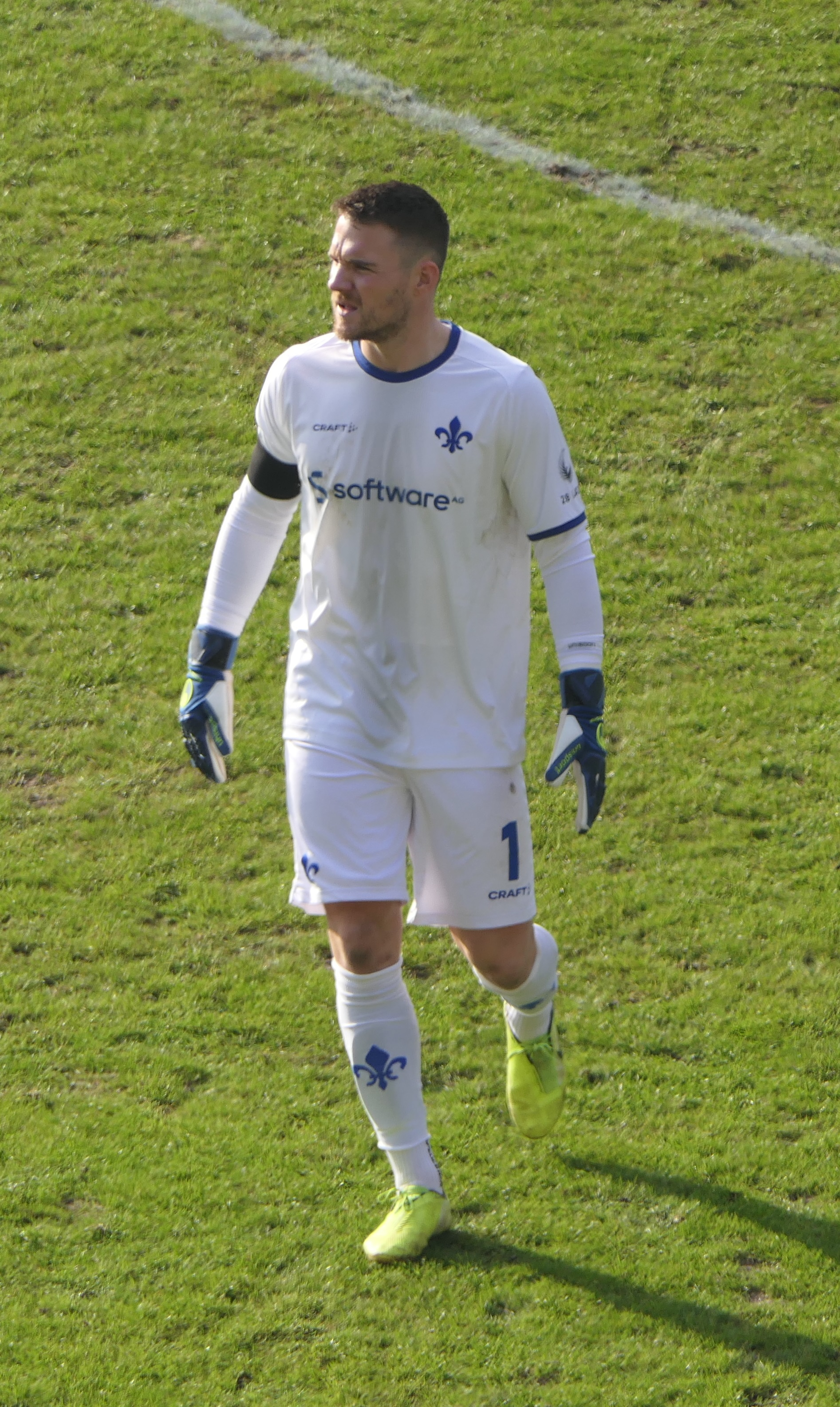
- Schuhen in 2023

Personal information
- Full name: Marcel Schuhen
- Date of birth: 13 January 1993 (age 33)
- Place of birth: Kirchen, Germany
- Height: 1.88 m (6 ft 2 in)
- Position: Goalkeeper

Team information
- Current team: Darmstadt 98
- Number: 1

Youth career
- –2006: SC 09 Brachbach
- 2006–2012: 1. FC Köln

Senior career*
Years	Team	Apps	(Gls)
2012–2014	1. FC Köln II	63	(0)
2012–2014	1. FC Köln	0	(0)
2015–2017	Hansa Rostock	91	(0)
2017–2019	SV Sandhausen	56	(0)
2019–	Darmstadt 98	220	(0)
- * Club domestic league appearances and goals as of 18 May 2026

Marcel Schuhen (born 13 January 1993) is a German professional footballer who plays as a goalkeeper for 2. Bundesliga club Darmstadt 98.

== Career statistics ==
As of match played 10 May 2026

Appearances and goals by club, season and competition
Club	Season	League			Cup		Other		Total	
Club	Season	Division	Apps	Goals	Apps	Goals	Apps	Goals	Apps	Goals
FC Köln II	2012–13	Regionalliga West	30	0	—		0	0	30	0
FC Köln II	2013–14	Regionalliga West	27	0	—		0	0	27	0
FC Köln II	2014–15	Regionalliga West	6	0	—		0	0	6	0
FC Köln II	Total		63	0	—		0	0	63	0
FC Köln	2012–13	2. Bundesliga	0	0	0	0	—		0	0
FC Köln	2013–14	2. Bundesliga	0	0	0	0	—		0	0
FC Köln	Total		0	0	0	0	—		0	0
Hansa Rostock	2014–15	3. Liga	16	0	0	0	2 (Note: Appearances in Mecklenburg-Vorpommern Cup)	0	18	0
Hansa Rostock	2015–16	3. Liga	37	0	1	0	2	0	40	0
Hansa Rostock	2016–17	3. Liga	38	0	1	0	1	0	40	0
Hansa Rostock	Total		91	0	2	0	5	0	98	0
SV Sandhausen	2017–18	2. Bundesliga	34	0	0	0	—		34	0
SV Sandhausen	2018–19	2. Bundesliga	22	0	0	0	—		22	0
SV Sandhausen	Total		56	0	0	0	—		56	0
Darmstadt 98	2019–20	2. Bundesliga	26	0	1	0	—		27	0
Darmstadt 98	2020–21	2. Bundesliga	32	0	2	0	—		34	0
Darmstadt 98	2021–22	2. Bundesliga	31	0	1	0	—		32	0
Darmstadt 98	2022–23	2. Bundesliga	32	0	3	0	—		35	0
Darmstadt 98	2023–24	Bundesliga	31	0	1	0	—		32	0
Darmstadt 98	2024–25	2. Bundesliga	34	0	2	0	—		36	0
Darmstadt 98	2025–26	2. Bundesliga	33	0	3	0	—		36	0
Darmstadt 98	Total		219	0	13	0	0	0	232	0
Career total			429	0	15	0	5	0	449	0
