= Dirk Schuster =

German footballer (born 1967)

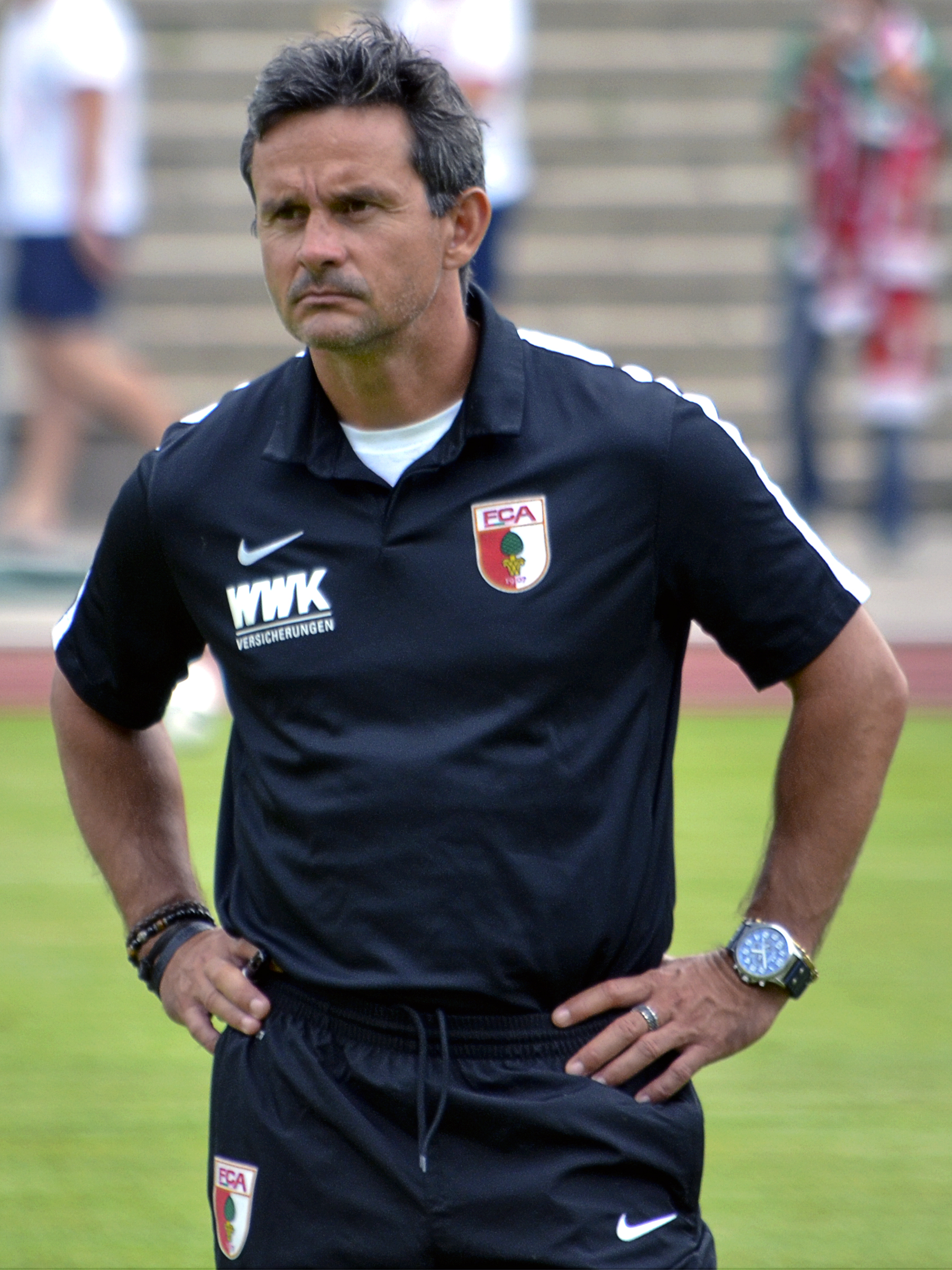
- Schuster with Augsburg in 2016

Personal information
- Full name: Eberhard Dirk Schuster
- Date of birth: 29 December 1967 (age 58)
- Place of birth: Karl-Marx-Stadt, East Germany
- Height: 1.78 m (5 ft 10 in)
- Position: Defender

Team information
- Current team: Torpedo Kutaisi (head coach)

Youth career
- 1985–1986: Karl-Marx-Stadt

Senior career*
| Years | Team | Apps | (Gls) |
| 1986–1988 | Sachsenring Zwickau | 12 | (1) |
| 1988–1990 | Magdeburg | 40 | (0) |
| 1990–1991 | Eintracht Braunschweig | 35 | (4) |
| 1991–1997 | Karlsruher SC | 167 | (3) |
| 1997–1999 | 1. FC Köln | 62 | (5) |
| 1999–2000 | Antalyaspor | 29 | (0) |
| 2000 | VfB Admira Wacker Mödling | 10 | (0) |
| 2001–2002 | LR Ahlen | 50 | (6) |
| 2002–2004 | SV Wilhelmshaven | 36 | (4) |
| 2004–2006 | Waldhof Mannheim | 66 | (4) |
| 2006 | ASV Durlach | | |
| 2007 | Alemannia Wilferdingen | | |

International career
| 1990 | East Germany | 4 | (0) |
| 1994–1995 | Germany | 3 | (0) |

Managerial career
- 2007: ASV Durlach
- 2009–2012: Stuttgarter Kickers
- 2012–2016: Darmstadt 98
- 2016: FC Augsburg
- 2017–2019: Darmstadt 98
- 2019–2021: Erzgebirge Aue
- 2022–2023: 1. FC Kaiserslautern
- 2025–: Torpedo Kutaisi
- * Club domestic league appearances and goals

Eberhard Dirk Schuster (born 29 December 1967) is a German professional football manager and former player, currently in charge of Georgian Erovnuli Liga club Torpedo Kutaisi. He previously managed Darmstadt 98, among others, leading the club from the 3. Liga to the Bundesliga and being named Manager of the Year in Germany in 2016.

== Club career ==
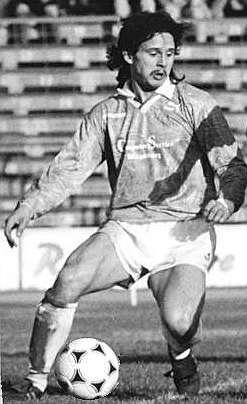
Schuster playing for Magdeburg in 1990

Schuster, who lived his youth in the East Germany, was one of the first East German players to make the move into the West, starting in Eintracht Braunschweig and soon moving on to Karlsruher SC in 1991, where he established himself as a respected center-back.

A move to 1. FC Köln in 1997 proved less successful, and in the following journeyman years he played in Turkey and Austria. He then played for newly promoted Second Bundesliga club LR Ahlen in 2000, where he had a good stint, before he returned to Austria and then played in the Oberliga, the fourth-highest league with Waldhof.

== International career ==
He was capped three times in the Germany national team and before that four times in the East Germany national team. He made his debut for East Germany against the United States in East Berlin in March 1990.

== Managerial career ==
=== ASV Durlach ===
Schuster's first coaching job was as interim coach for ASV Durlach between 16 October 2006 and 10 January 2007.

=== Stuttgarter Kickers ===
On 30 May 2009, Schuster was named as the new head coach of the Stuttgarter Kickers, where he signed a two-year contract until 30 June 2011, which was prematurely extended on 1 April 2010 until 20 June 2012. He guided Kickers to the Regionalliga Süd title in 2011–12, and promotion to the 3. Liga, but was sacked in November 2012 after going five games without scoring a goal. He was appointed manager of 3. Liga side SV Darmstadt 98, a month later. He finished with a record of 55 wins, 35 draws, and 26 losses.

=== Darmstadt 98 ===
Schuster took over as SV Darmstadt 98 head coach on 28 December 2012. Despite Schuster helping Darmstadt 98 off the bottom of the league, they finished among the relegation places in the 2012–13 season, Schuster's Darmstadt avoided dropping into Germany's fourth tier, the Regionalliga Südwest, thanks to the failure of fierce local rival Kickers Offenbach in obtaining the licence for the new season due to going into administration.

In the following season, to the surprise of all experts, Darmstadt managed to get third in the league, which meant a relegation-promotion play-off spot for the 2. Bundesliga. Darmstadt faced Arminia Bielefeld in the play-off and won promotion in dramatic fashion after losing 1–3 at home in the first leg but turning the deficit around in the second leg and scoring the winning 4–2 in the 122nd minute, which meant promotion on away goals.

In the following season, Schuster managed to surprise everyone for a second time by finishing 2nd in the league and achieving back-to-back promotion to the Bundesliga after a 33-year absence.

He finished with a record of 53 wins, 43 draws, and 35 losses.

He was later voted German Coach of the Year for his performance in the 2015–16 Bundesliga season.

=== Augsburg ===
Schuster took over as manager of FC Augsburg on 2 June 2016; he replaced Markus Weinzierl who left for FC Schalke 04. Schuster was sacked on 14 December 2016.

=== Return to Darmstadt ===
On 11 December 2017, Schuster was once again appointed manager of Darmstadt 98, replacing Torsten Frings. He was sacked on 18 February 2019.

=== Erzgebirge Aue ===
Schuster was appointed as the new manager of Erzgebirge Aue on 26 August 2019. He left Aue after the 2020–21 season.

=== 1. FC Kaiserslautern ===
He was named head coach of 1. FC Kaiserslautern on 10 May 2022. In November 2023, he was sacked.

=== Torpedo Kutaisi ===
In February 2025, Schuster took charge of Erovnuli Liga club Torpedo Kutaisi on a three-year deal.

== Managerial statistics ==
As of 26 November 2023

| Team | From | To | Record | | | | | |
| Team | From | To | G | W | D | L | Win % | Ref. |
|---|---|---|---|---|---|---|---|---|
| Stuttgarter Kickers | 30 May 2009 | 19 November 2011 | 116 | 55 | 35 | 26 | 47.41 | |
| Darmstadt 98 | 28 December 2012 | 2 June 2016 | 131 | 53 | 43 | 35 | 40.46 | |
| FC Augsburg | 2 June 2016 | 14 December 2016 | 16 | 4 | 5 | 7 | 25.00 | |
| Darmstadt 98 | 11 December 2017 | 18 February 2019 | 41 | 13 | 12 | 16 | 31.71 | |
| Erzgebirge Aue | 26 August 2019 | 30 June 2021 | 65 | 23 | 15 | 27 | 35.38 | |
| Kaiserslautern | 10 May 2022 | 30 November 2023 | 53 | 19 | 16 | 18 | 35.85 | |
| Total | | | 422 | 167 | 126 | 129 | 39.57 | |

== Honours ==
=== As a player ===
Karlsruhe

- UEFA Intertoto Cup: 1996
- DFB-Pokal runner-up: 1995–96

=== As a manager ===
Individual

- German Football Manager of the Year: 2016
