= Aleksandar Vukotić =

Serbian footballer

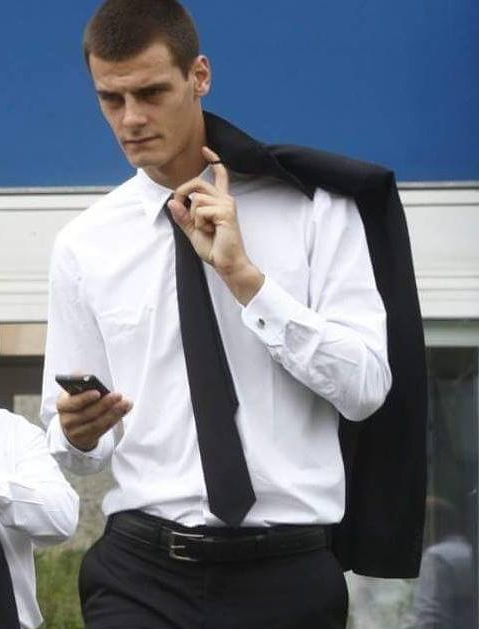
- Vukotić in 2016

Personal information
- Date of birth: 22 July 1995 (age 31)
- Place of birth: Kraljevo, FR Yugoslavia
- Height: 2.01 m (6 ft 7 in)
- Position: Centre-back

Team information
- Current team: Darmstadt 98
- Number: 20

Youth career
- 2002–2011: Volej Vrnjačka Banja
- 2011–2014: Sloga Kraljevo

Senior career*
Years	Team	Apps	(Gls)
2014	Sloga Kraljevo	1	(0)
2014–2015	Dolina Padina	21	(2)
2015–2018	Krupa	57	(3)
2018–2023	Beveren	133	(7)
2023–2024	SV Wehen Wiesbaden	28	(2)
2024–	Darmstadt 98	61	(4)
- * Club domestic league appearances and goals as of 18 May 2026

Aleksandar Vukotić (born 22 July 1995) is a Serbian professional footballer who plays as a centre-back for 2. Bundesliga club Darmstadt 98.

== Career ==
Vukotić signed a three-year contract with Beveren on 14 May 2018 for a €350.000 transfer fee, making him the most expensive Wassland-Beveren player of all time.

Vukotić made his official debut for Beveren on 28 July 2018, in a 2–2 away league draw against Zulte Waregem.

== Honours ==
Krupa

- First League of RS: 2015–16
- Bosnian Cup runner-up: 2017–18
