= SV Darmstadt 98 =

Association football club in Germany

Darmstadt 98
- Full name: Sportverein Darmstadt 1898 e.V.
- Nickname: Die Lilien (The Lilies)
- Founded: 22 May 1898; 128 years ago
- Stadium: Merck-Stadion am Böllenfalltor
- Capacity: 17,810
- President: Markus Pfitzner
- Head coach: Florian Kohfeldt
- League: 2. Bundesliga
- 2025–26: 2. Bundesliga, 5th of 18
- Website: sv98.de
Home colours	Away colours	Third colours

Sportverein Darmstadt 1898 e.V., commonly known as Darmstadt 98 (German pronunciation: [ˌdaʁmʃtat ʔaxtʔʊntˈnɔɪ̯nt͡sɪç]), is a German professional association football club based in Darmstadt, Hesse. The club was founded on 22 May 1898 as FC Olympia Darmstadt. Early in 1919, the association was briefly known as Rasen-Sportverein Olympia before merging with Darmstädter Sport Club 1905 on 11 November that year to become Sportverein Darmstadt 98. Merger partner SC was the product of a 1905 union between Viktoria 1900 Darmstadt and Germania 1903 Darmstadt. The footballers are today part of a sports club which also offers its over 13,500 members basketball, hiking, futsal, judo, and table tennis.

The football department competed in the Bundesliga for the 2015–16 and 2016–17 seasons after a 33-year run in lower leagues. Darmstadt 98 were promoted again to the Bundesliga in 2023; however, they did not avoid relegation the following season.

== History ==
=== Early history ===
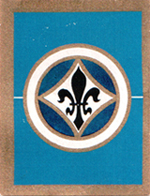
Cigarette card with the crest of the club from 1930

Olympia played as a lower table side in the Westkreisliga between 1909 and 1913. In the late 20s and early 30s the club played as SV Darmstadt in the Kreisliga Odenwald and Bezirksliga Main-Hessen, Gruppe Hesse, but struggled to stay in top flight competition. In 1933, German football was reorganized under the Third Reich into sixteen premier divisions known as Gauligen. Darmstadt was not able to break into upper league play until 1941 when they joined the Gauliga Hessen-Nassau, Gruppe 2. Their stay was short-lived and they were relegated after their second season of play at that level. By 1944–45 the division had collapsed in the face of the advance of Allied armies into Germany.

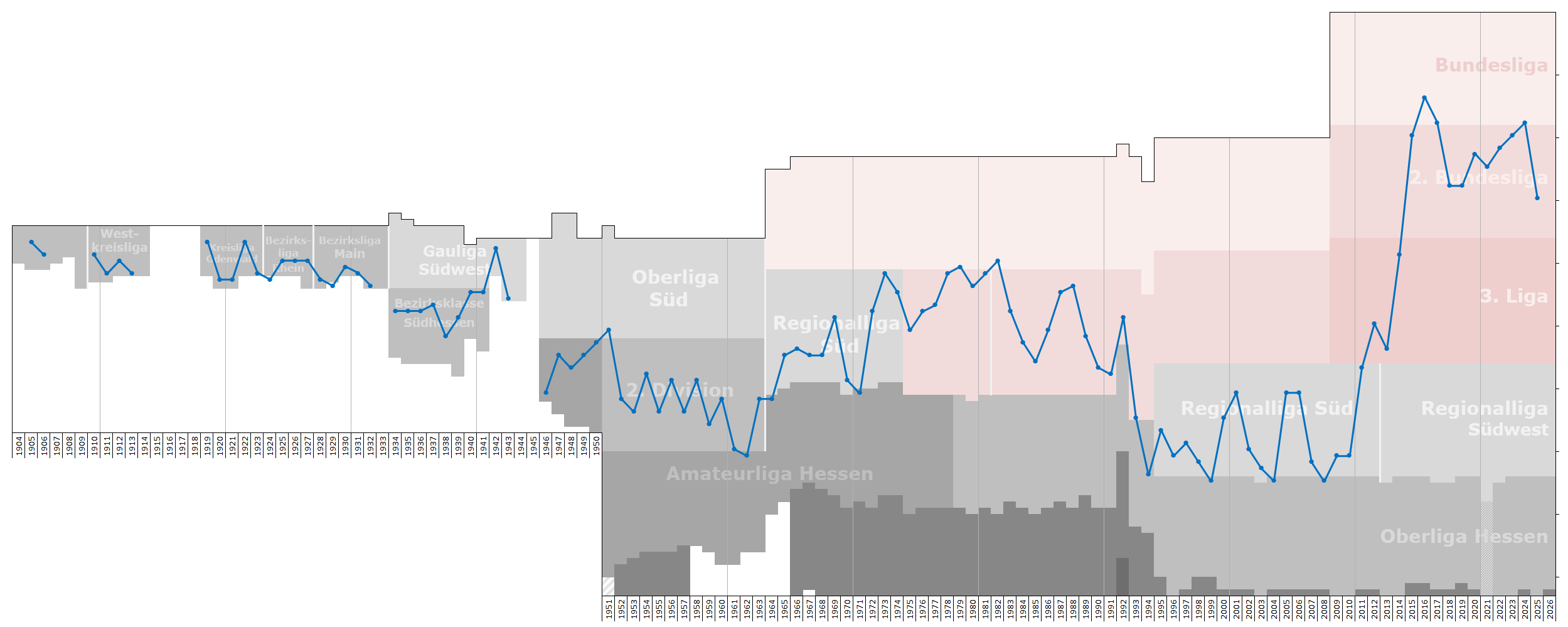
Historical chart of SV Darmstadt league performance

Darmstadt enjoyed a long run as a second division team through the 50s and then again from the time of the formation of the Bundesliga in 1963 on into the 70s. However, they were never better than a lower to mid-table side until a breakthrough happened in 1973 with a Regionalliga Süd championship and participation in the promotion rounds for the Bundesliga, where they finished a distant second to Rot-Weiss Essen.

=== From the Bundesliga to insolvency ===
A side with limited resources, Darmstadt eventually managed two seasons in the Bundesliga (1978–79 and 1981–82). They narrowly missed a third turn in the top league in 1988 when they lost in a lengthy relegation-promotion play-off to Waldhof Mannheim in a penalty shoot-out of the third match between the two clubs. In the following years, Darmstadt 98 escaped relegation to the Amateur Oberliga Hessen (III) in 1991 when Essen was refused a 2. Bundesliga licence for financial reasons. However, by 1997, SV had themselves become victims of financial mismanagement, slipping to the third and fourth divisions.

The team's most recent successes include wins in the Hessen Pokal (Hessen Cup) in 1999, 2001, 2006, 2007 and 2008, as well as three consecutive Possmann-Hessen Cup wins from 2000 to 2002. In the DFB-Pokal, Darmstadt advanced as far as the third round in 1989 and 2001, and to the quarter-finals in 1986. In 2004, the club won the Oberliga Hessen (IV) championship under manager and former player Bruno Labbadia, and were promoted to the Regionalliga Süd (III).

Financial problems limited their options and they were relegated to the Oberliga Hessen (IV) at the end of the 2006–07 season. The club's stated aim was to reach the new 3. Liga within five years. However, on 6 March 2008, Darmstadt entered insolvency proceedings, with debts of around €1.1 million making the future of the club uncertain. After the 2007–08 Oberliga Hessen Championship, Darmstadt played in the Regionalliga Süd. Darmstadt took various measures to avert bankruptcy, for example a friendly benefit match against Bayern Munich, donations etc. In addition, the former management of the club (e.g. former president, former tax advisor) made vital financial contributions which secured the club's future.

=== Rise to the Bundesliga ===
After winning the 2010–11 Regionalliga Süd in dramatic fashion, Darmstadt were promoted to the 3. Liga. In 2012, Dirk Schuster was appointed as head coach, and he signed Darmstadt's future captain, Aytaç Sulu. In the 2012–13 season, the club was initially relegated but their fiercest rivals Kickers Offenbach were refused a 3. Liga licence due to going into administration and were relegated to the Regionalliga instead. Darmstadt 98 took Offenbach's place.

In 2013–14, having finished third in league and thus gaining entry into the promotion-relegation play-offs, Darmstadt defeated Arminia Bielefeld in the second leg through away goals after losing 1–3 in the first leg at home to secure promotion to 2. Bundesliga for the first time in 21 years in dramatic circumstances.

In the following 2. Bundesliga season, Darmstadt secured the second-place position in the league and therefore promotion to the Bundesliga after a 33-year absence. In their final league match, against FC St. Pauli, the club won 1–0 at home through a 70th minute free-kick by Tobias Kempe. This was a second consecutive promotion for the team, led again by coach Schuster and captain Sulu.

Darmstadt reached the Round of 16 of the 2015–16 DFB Pokal. On 8 March 2016, long-term fan Jonathan Heimes died of cancer and, posthumously, Darmstadt's stadium was renamed as "Jonathan-Heimes-Stadion am Böllenfalltor" for the 2016–17 season. Darmstadt finished the 2015–16 season in 14th position, mainly due to a positive away record.

Coach Dirk Schuster announced his decision to join FC Augsburg, and Norbert Meier was appointed as head coach for the 2016–17 season. After being defeated in the second round of the 2016–17 DFB Pokal and only scoring 8 points in 12 games, Maier was sacked on 5 December 2016. On 27 December 2016, former Bundesliga player and Werder Bremen assistant manager Torsten Frings was presented as new head coach. However, the team was incapable of securing the next season in the Bundesliga after a 0–1 defeat to Bayern Munich in the 32nd matchday of the season, and was relegated to the 2. Bundesliga.

After a poor start to the 2017–18-second Bundesliga season, Torsten Frings was removed from his position, and, on 11 December 2017, the vacant manager's position was again filled by Dirk Schuster, who returned to the Darmstadt club for his second spell as manager. He finished 10th in the league.

In the 2018–19 2. Bundesliga season, Dimitrios Grammozis replaced Schuster after 23 points out of 22 games, going on to finish 10th. In the following season, the club finished 5th. After the season, Markus Anfang took over as head coach.

In the 2022–23 2. Bundesliga season, Darmstardt secured automatic promotion to the Bundesliga by beating 1. FC Magdeburg 1–0 at home.

They were relegated the following season from the Bundesliga, finishing bottom of the table in 18th. The club only recorded three wins for the entire season out of a possible 34 matches.

== Players ==
=== Current squad ===
As of 10 September 2026

Note: Flags indicate national team as defined under FIFA eligibility rules; some limited exceptions apply. Players may hold more than one non-FIFA nationality.

No.	Pos.	Nation	Player
1	GK	GER	Marcel Schuhen (captain)
3	DF	GER	Florian Kleinhansl
4	DF	USA	Grayson Dettoni
5	MF	GER	Marco Richter
6	DF	GHA	Patric Pfeiffer
7	FW	GER	Noah Weißhaupt
8	FW	GER	Luca Marseiler
9	FW	KOR	Lee Ho-jae
10	MF	BEL	Nicolas Verkooijen
11	FW	MAR	Ibrahim El Kadiri
14	DF	MNE	Meldin Drešković
15	MF	BUL	Fabian Nürnberger
16	MF	JPN	Hiroki Akiyama
17	MF	GER	Kai Klefisch
18	DF	ITA	Raoul Petretta
19	FW	GER	Fynn Lakenmacher
20	DF	SRB	Aleksandar Vukotić

No.	Pos.	Nation	Player
21	MF	GER	Merveille Papela
22	FW	GER	Lars Kehl
23	MF	GER	Carlo Sickinger
24	GK	GER	Benedikt Börner
25	DF	FRA	William Mikelbrencis
26	DF	GER	Matthias Bader
28	DF	GER	Christopher Lannert
30	GK	GER	Alexander Brunst
36	FW	NED	Milan Smit (on loan from Stoke City)
41	DF	NED	Lance Duijvestijn
44	FW	JPN	Yosuke Furukawa
45	DF	GER	Max Pfister
47	MF	GER	Milian Herbst
48	FW	GER	Manolo Merx
49	DF	GER	Yannik Lührs

=== Out on loan ===
Note: Flags indicate national team as defined under FIFA eligibility rules; some limited exceptions apply. Players may hold more than one non-FIFA nationality.

No.	Pos.	Nation	Player
—	DF	GER	Tim Arnold (at Sportfreunde Siegen until 30 June 2027)
—	FW	GER	Fabio Torsiello (at Alemannia Aachen until 30 June 2027)

== Current technical staff ==
As of 14 September 2020

Position	Name
Head coach	(Germany) Florian Kohfeldt
Assistant coaches	(Germany) Martin Heck (Germany) Darius Scholtysik
Goalkeeping coach	(Germany) Alexander Kynaß
Head of performance	(England) Alexander Ryan
Fitness coach	(Germany) Christopher Busse
Rehabilitation coach	(Germany) Florian Bauer
Video analysts	(Germany) Maximilian Kohl (Germany) Johannes Behlau (Germany) Immanuel Höhn
Sporting director	(England) Paul Fernie
Head of the licensed players department	(Germany) Matthias Neumann
Team manager	(Germany) Jonas Nietzel
Head of physiotherapy department	(Germany) Morris Sepoetro
Physiotherapists	(Germany) Fabian Fischer (Germany) Katrin Herbig (Germany) Maximilian Schubert
Supervisor	(Germany) Michael Richter (Germany) Sebastian Hein
Sports psychologist	(Austria) Dr. Andreas Marlovits
Team doctors	(Germany) Dr. Philip Jessen (Germany) Dr. Alexander Lesch (Germany) Dr. Marc Schneider (Germany) Dr. Oscar Velasquez

== Honours ==
The club's honours:

=== League ===
- Regionalliga Süd (II)
  - Champions: 1972–73
- 2. Bundesliga Süd (II)
  - Champions: 1978, 1981
- 2. Bundesliga (II)
  - Runners-up: 2014–15, 2022–23
- Regionalliga Süd (IV)
  - Champions: 2011
- Hessenliga (II/III/IV)
  - Champions: 1950, 1962, 1964, 1971, 1999, 2004, 2008

=== Cup ===
- Hesse Cup (Tiers III–VII)
  - Winners: 1966^{†}, 1999, 2001, 2006, 2007, 2008, 2013
  - Runners-up: 1971, 2009, 2014

== Recent seasons ==
The recent season-by-season performance of the club:

Season	Division	Tier	Position
1963–64	Amateurliga Hessen	III	1st ↑
1964–65	Regionalliga Süd	II	14th
1965–66	Regionalliga Süd	II	13th
1966–67	Regionalliga Süd	II	14th
1967–68	Regionalliga Süd	II	14th
1968–69	Regionalliga Süd	II	8th
1969–70	Regionalliga Süd	II	18th ↓
1970–71	Hessenliga	III	1st ↑
1971–72	Regionalliga Süd	II	7th
1972–73	Regionalliga Süd	II	1st
1973–74	Regionalliga Süd	II	4th
1974–75	2. Bundesliga Süd	II	10th
1975–76	2. Bundesliga Süd	II	7th
1976–77	2. Bundesliga Süd	II	6th
1977–78	2. Bundesliga Süd	II	1st ↑
1978–79	Bundesliga	I	18th ↓
1979–80	2. Bundesliga Süd	II	4th
1980–81	2. Bundesliga Süd	II	1st ↑
1981–82	Bundesliga	I	17th ↓
1982–83	2. Bundesliga	II	7th
1983–84	2. Bundesliga	II	12th
1984–85	2. Bundesliga	II	15th
1985–86	2. Bundesliga	II	10th
1986–87	2. Bundesliga	II	4th
1987–88	2. Bundesliga	II	3rd
1988–89	2. Bundesliga	II	11th
1989–90	2. Bundesliga	II	16th
1990–91	2. Bundesliga	II	17th
1991–92	2. Bundesliga Süd	II	8th
1992–93	2. Bundesliga	II	24th ↓
1993–94	Oberliga Hessen	III	9th
1994–95	Regionalliga Süd	III	11th
1995–96	Regionalliga Süd	III	15th
1996–97	Regionalliga Süd	III	13th
1997–98	Regionalliga Süd	III	16th ↓
1998–99	Oberliga Hessen	IV	1st
1999–00	Regionalliga Süd	III	9th
2000–01	Regionalliga Süd	III	5th
2001–02	Regionalliga Süd	III	14th
2002–03	Regionalliga Süd	III	17th ↓
2003–04	Oberliga Hessen	IV	1st ↑
2004–05	Regionalliga Süd	III	5th
2005–06	Regionalliga Süd	III	5th
2006–07	Regionalliga Süd	III	16th ↓
2007–08	Oberliga Hessen	IV	1st ↑
2008–09	Regionalliga Süd	IV	15th
2009–10	Regionalliga Süd	IV	15th
2010–11	Regionalliga Süd	IV	1st ↑
2011–12	3. Liga	III	14th
2012–13	3. Liga	III	18th
2013–14	3. Liga	III	3rd ↑
2014–15	2. Bundesliga	II	2nd ↑
2015–16	Bundesliga	I	14th
2016–17	Bundesliga	I	18th ↓
2017–18	2. Bundesliga	II	10th
2018–19	2. Bundesliga	II	10th
2019–20	2. Bundesliga	II	5th
2020–21	2. Bundesliga	II	7th
2021–22	2. Bundesliga	II	4th
2022–23	2. Bundesliga	II	2nd ↑
2023–24	Bundesliga	I	18th ↓
2024–25	2. Bundesliga	II	12th
2025–26	2. Bundesliga	II	5th
2026–27	2. Bundesliga	II	

- With the introduction of the Regionalligas in 1994 and the 3. Liga in 2008 as the new third tier, below the 2. Bundesliga, all leagues below dropped one tier.

== Former managers ==
The managers of the club:

Start	End	Manager
1968	1970	(Germany) Heinz Lucas †
1971	1976	(Germany) Udo Klug †
1978	1979	(Germany) Lothar Buchmann
1979	1979	(Germany) Klaus Schlappner
1979	1980	(Germany) Jörg Berger
1981	1982	(Germany) Werner Olk
1982	1983	(Germany) Manfred Krafft
1983	1984	(Germany) Timo Zahnleiter
1984	1984	(Germany) Lothar Kleim
1985	1986	(Germany) Udo Klug †
1986	1987	(Germany) Eckhard Krautzun
1987	1988	(Germany) Klaus Schlappner
1988	1989	(Germany) Werner Olk
1989	1989	(Germany) Eckhard Krautzun
1989	1990	(Germany) Dieter Renner †
1990	1990	(Germany) Uwe Klimaschefski
1990	1991	(Germany) Jürgen Sparwasser
1994	1996	(Germany) Gerhard Kleppinger
1996	1996	(Germany) Max Reichenberger
1996	1998	(Germany) Lothar Buchmann
1998	1999	(Federal Republic of Yugoslavia) Slavko Petrović
1999	2000	(Germany) Eckhard Krautzun
2000	2002	(Germany) Michael Feichtenbeiner
2002	2003	(Germany) Hans-Werner Moser
2003	2006	(Germany) Bruno Labbadia
2006	2006	(Italy) Gino Lettieri
2006	2009	(Germany) Gerhard Kleppinger
2009	2010	(Serbia) Živojin Juškić
24 March 2010	2 September 2012	(Germany) Kosta Runjaić
5 September 2012	17 December 2012	(Germany) Jürgen Seeberger
2012	2016	(Germany) Dirk Schuster
1 July 2016	5 December 2016	(Germany) Norbert Meier
5 December 2016	27 December 2016	(Germany) Ramon Berndroth (interim)
3 January 2017	9 December 2017	(Germany) Torsten Frings
12 December 2017	18 February 2019	(Germany) Dirk Schuster
24 February 2019	30 June 2020	(Greece) Dimitrios Grammozis
1 July 2020	30 June 2021	(Germany) Markus Anfang
1 July 2021	1 September 2024	(Germany) Torsten Lieberknecht
7 September 2024		(Germany) Florian Kohfeldt
