= Silvio Pagano =

Italian-German footballer

Personal information
- Date of birth: 12 September 1985 (age 41)
- Place of birth: Wuppertal, West Germany
- Height: 1.80 m (5 ft 11 in)
- Position: Right winger

Senior career*
Years	Team	Apps	(Gls)
2003–2006	FC Köln II	44	(9)
2006–2007	Carl Zeiss Jena	6	(0)
2007	SSVg Velbert		
2007–2008	SC Verl	20	(5)
2008–2009	Rot-Weiß Essen	25	(1)
2009–2010	Sportfreunde Lotte	22	(3)
2010–2011	Wuppertaler SV	31	(8)
2011–2013	SC Fortuna Köln	61	(28)
2013–2015	Viktoria Köln	47	(10)
2015–2016	KFC Uerdingen 05	23	(7)
2016–2019	Wuppertaler SV	71	(4)
- * Club domestic league appearances and goals as of 21:31, 5 August 2019 (UTC)

Silvio Pagano (born 12 September 1985) is an Italian-German footballer who most recently played for Wuppertaler SV.
