= Fabian Nürnberger =

Bulgarian footballer

Fabian Nürnberger Фабиан Нюрнбергер
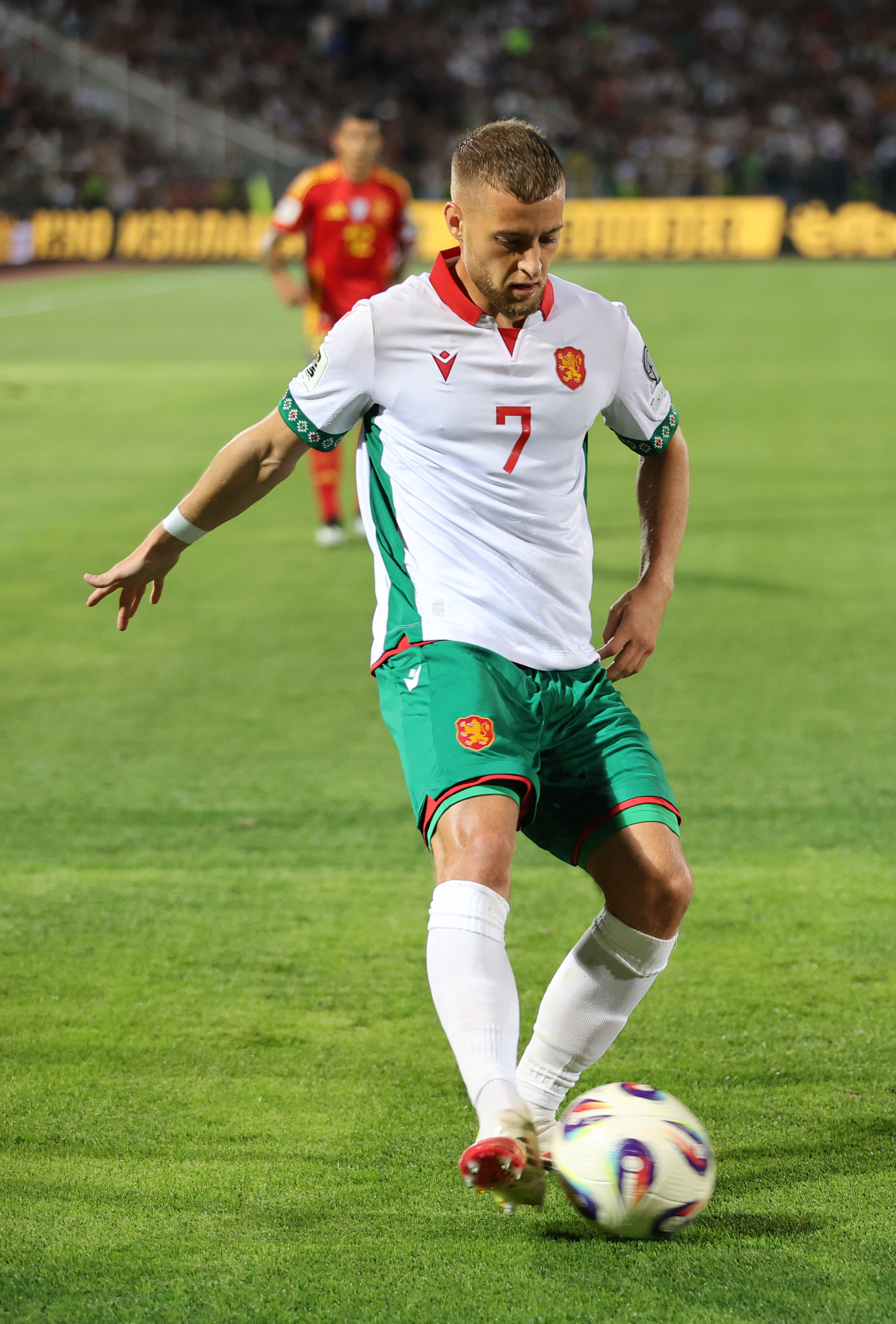
- Nürnberger with Bulgarian national team

Personal information
- Date of birth: 28 July 1999 (age 27)
- Place of birth: Hamburg, Germany
- Height: 1.75 m (5 ft 9 in)
- Positions: Left-back; central midfielder

Team information
- Current team: Darmstadt 98
- Number: 15

Youth career
- –2015: Hamburger SV
- 2015–2017: Eintracht Norderstedt
- 2017–2018: Niendorfer TSV

Senior career*
Years	Team	Apps	(Gls)
2018–2019	1. FC Nürnberg II	32	(3)
2019–2023	1. FC Nürnberg	100	(7)
2023–	Darmstadt 98	69	(4)

International career^{‡}
2024–	Bulgaria	10	(0)
- * Club domestic league appearances and goals as of 18 May 2026 ‡ National team caps and goals as of 20:41, 7 September 2025 (UTC)

Fabian Nürnberger (Bulgarian: Фабиан Нюрнбергер; born 28 July 1999) is a professional footballer who plays as a left-back or central midfielder for Darmstadt 98. Born in Germany, he plays for the Bulgaria national team.

== Career ==
Nürnberger was born in Hamburg. He played in his youth for the Niendorfer TSV under-19 team and made 21 appearances scoring 4 goals.

=== 1. FC Nürnberg ===
As an 18-year-old he moved to Bundesliga club 1. FC Nürnberg in Franconia. For his second team playing in the Regionalliga Bayern, the defender played 31 games as a regular player, in which he was able to contribute three goals and three assists. At the end of the season, he finished third with the team behind promoted and champion Bayern Munich II and VfB Eichstätt.

Following the season, Nürnberger received his first professional contract in May 2019, which is valid until 2021. In addition, he was permanently appointed to the FCN second division squad, trained by Damir Čanadi, for which he had already completed training sessions for the 2019–20 season. In the 1–0 home win against VfL Osnabrück on match day 4, Nürnberger was used for the first time after a substitution for a professional team.

On 13 March 2020, 1. FC Nürnberg announced that Nürnberger had tested positive for COVID-19.

=== Darmstadt 98 ===
On 30 May 2023, Nürnberger signed a contract with the returning to Bundesliga team of Darmstadt 98 until June 2026, coming as a free transfer.

== International career ==
Born in Germany to a German father and a Bulgarian mother, Nürnberger was eligible to represent both Germany and Bulgaria internationally.

In 2019 Krasimir Balakov, then coach of Bulgaria national team, considered Nürnberger for a call-up to the senior team. On 12 September 2023, Georgi Ivanov, technical director of the Bulgarian Football Union, announced that Nürnberger had accepted to represent Bulgaria on the international level and that they were working on making him available to debut in October or November 2023. On 19 August 2024 he received his first call-up for Bulgaria for the UEFA Nations League C matches against Belarus and Northern Ireland on 5 and 8 September. He debuted on 5 September 2024 against Belarus at the ZTE Arena in Hungary, playing the full game in a 0–0 draw.

== Career statistics ==
=== Club ===
As of match played 9 November 2024

Appearances and goals by club, season and competition
Club	Season	League			Cup		Continental		Other		Total	
Club	Season	Division	Apps	Goals	Apps	Goals	Apps	Goals	Apps	Goals	Apps	Goals
1. FC Nürnberg II	2018–19	Regionalliga Bayern	31	3	—		—		—		31	3
1. FC Nürnberg II	2019–20	Regionalliga Bayern	1	0	—		—		—		1	0
1. FC Nürnberg II	Total		32	3	—		—		—		32	3
1. FC Nürnberg	2019–20	2. Bundesliga	16	0	0	0	—		2	0	18	0
1. FC Nürnberg	2020–21	2. Bundesliga	29	3	1	0	—		—		29	0
1. FC Nürnberg	2021–22	2. Bundesliga	31	3	2	0	—		—		33	3
1. FC Nürnberg	2022–23	2. Bundesliga	24	1	3	0	—		—		27	1
1. FC Nürnberg	Total		100	7	6	0	—		2	0	108	7
Darmstadt 98	2023–24	Bundesliga	21	1	1	0	—		—		22	1
Darmstadt 98	2024–25	2. Bundesliga	11	0	2	1	—		—		13	1
Darmstadt 98	Total		32	1	3	1	—		—		35	2
Career total			164	11	10	1	0	0	2	0	177	12

=== International ===
As of match played 7 September 2025

Appearances and goals by national team and year
National team	Year	Apps	Goals
Bulgaria	2024	5	0
Bulgaria	2025	5	0
Total		10	0
