= Janus Genelli =

German painter

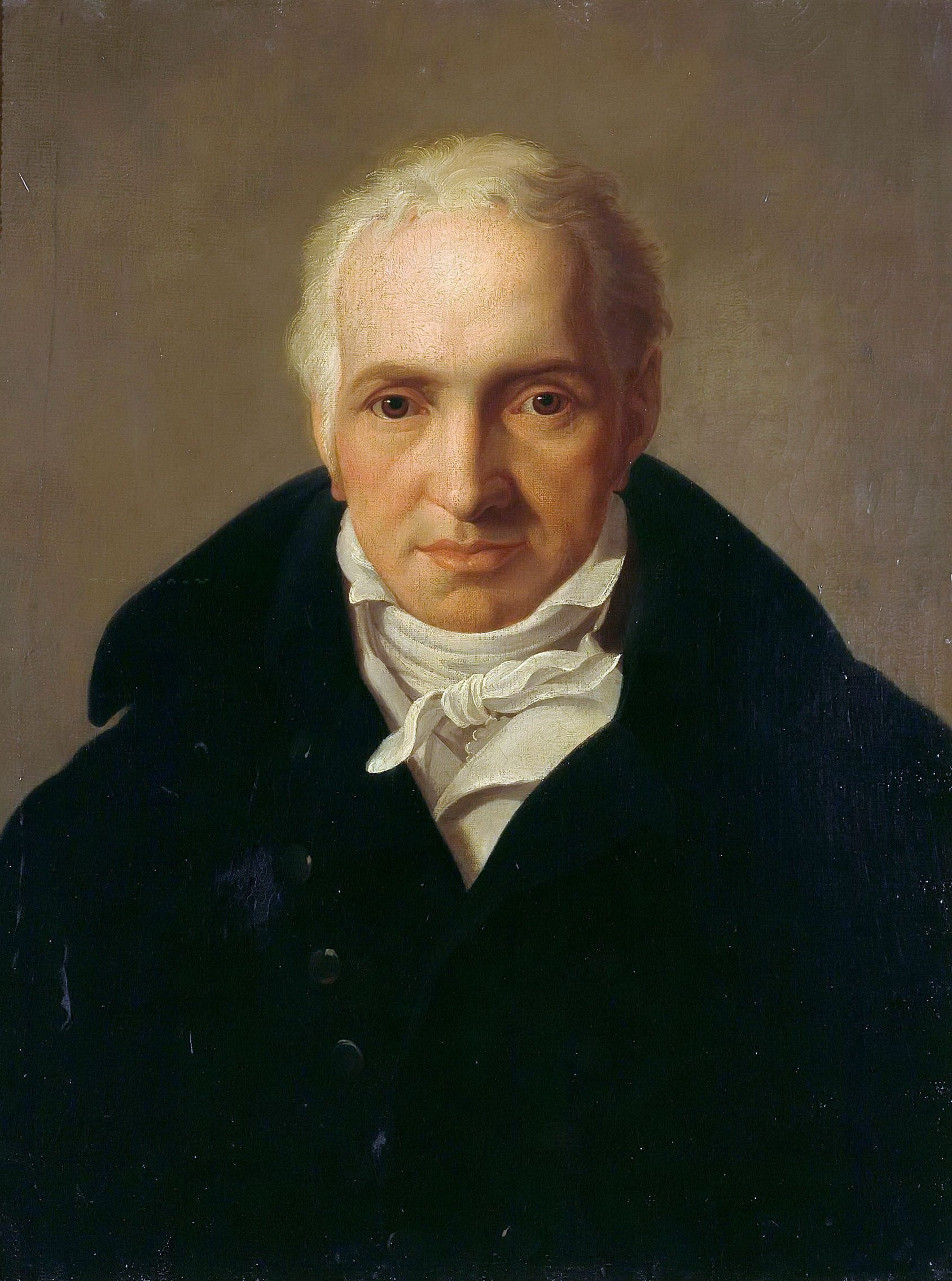
Janus Genelli; portrait by Friedrich Bury

Janus Genelli (1761–1813) was a German painter of Italian descent. He specialized in Classical landscapes.

== Biography ==
He came from a family of artists that originated in Rome. Around 1730, for unknown reasons, they emigrated to Denmark and settled in Copenhagen, where Genelli was born. His father, Joseph, worked as a silk knitter and embroiderer. They moved again in 1774, emigrating to Berlin by way of Vienna, to assist Frederick the Great in establishing a tapestry school.

It was there, around 1780, that he became a student of Blaise Nicholas Le Sueur, Director of the Academy of Arts. In 1786, he took a study trip to Rome, via Dresden, with his brother, the architect Hans Christian Genelli. There, he became acquainted with Jakob Philipp Hackert, who had a significant influence on his landscape style.

From 1803, he served as a drawing teacher for Queen Louise of Prussia and Crown Prince Friedrich Wilhelm, who was then only eight years old.

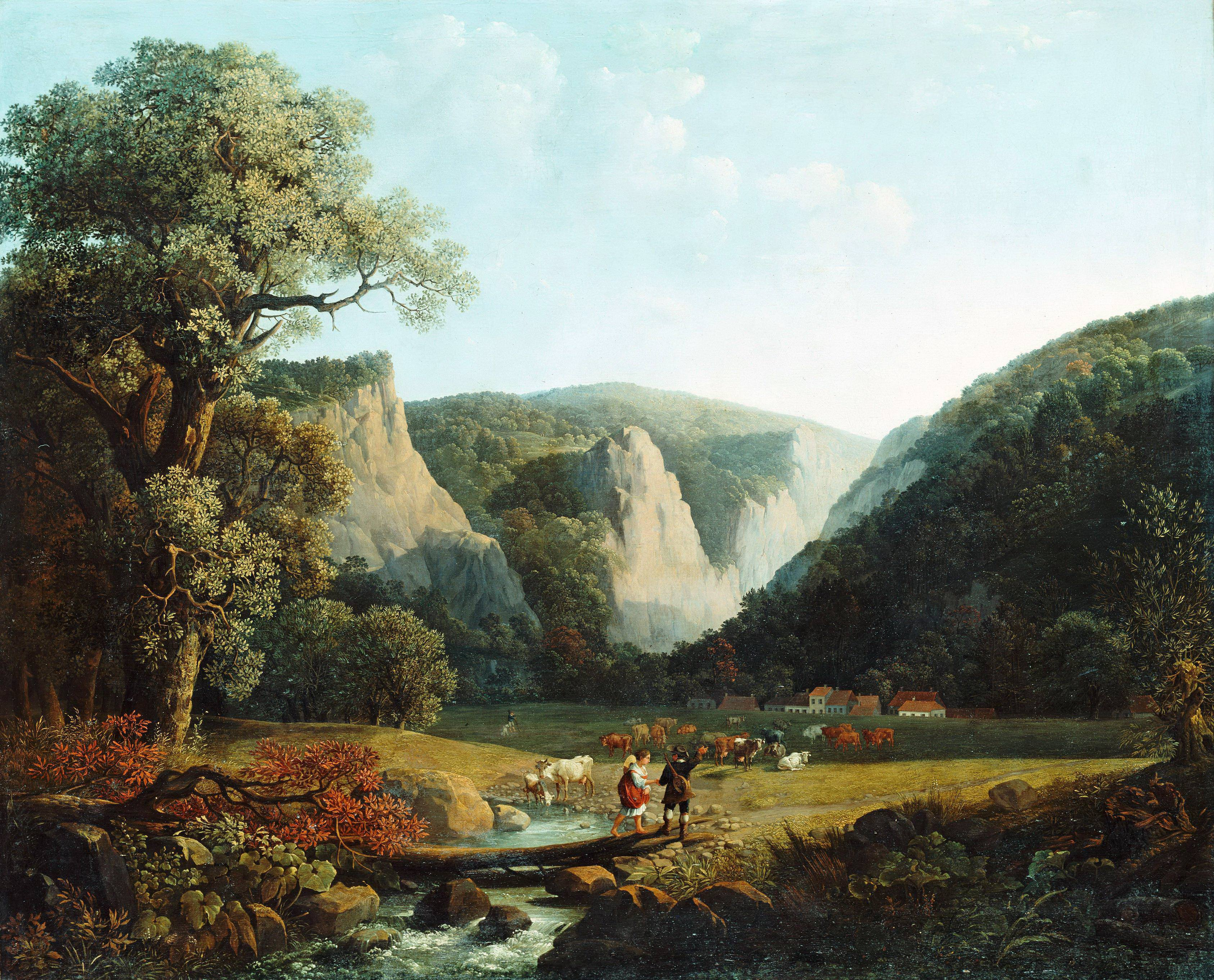
Harz Landscape

His works depict an ideal nature, with warm colors, even when dealing with dark subjects. Among his best works are his depictions of the Harz region and its mountains. His total output was rather small, and mostly unfamiliar today. It seems, however, that his works were highly regarded by his contemporaries.

Genelli died in Berlin in 1813. He was the father of Bonaventura Genelli, a well-known painter and graphic artist.
