= Merveille Papela =

German footballer

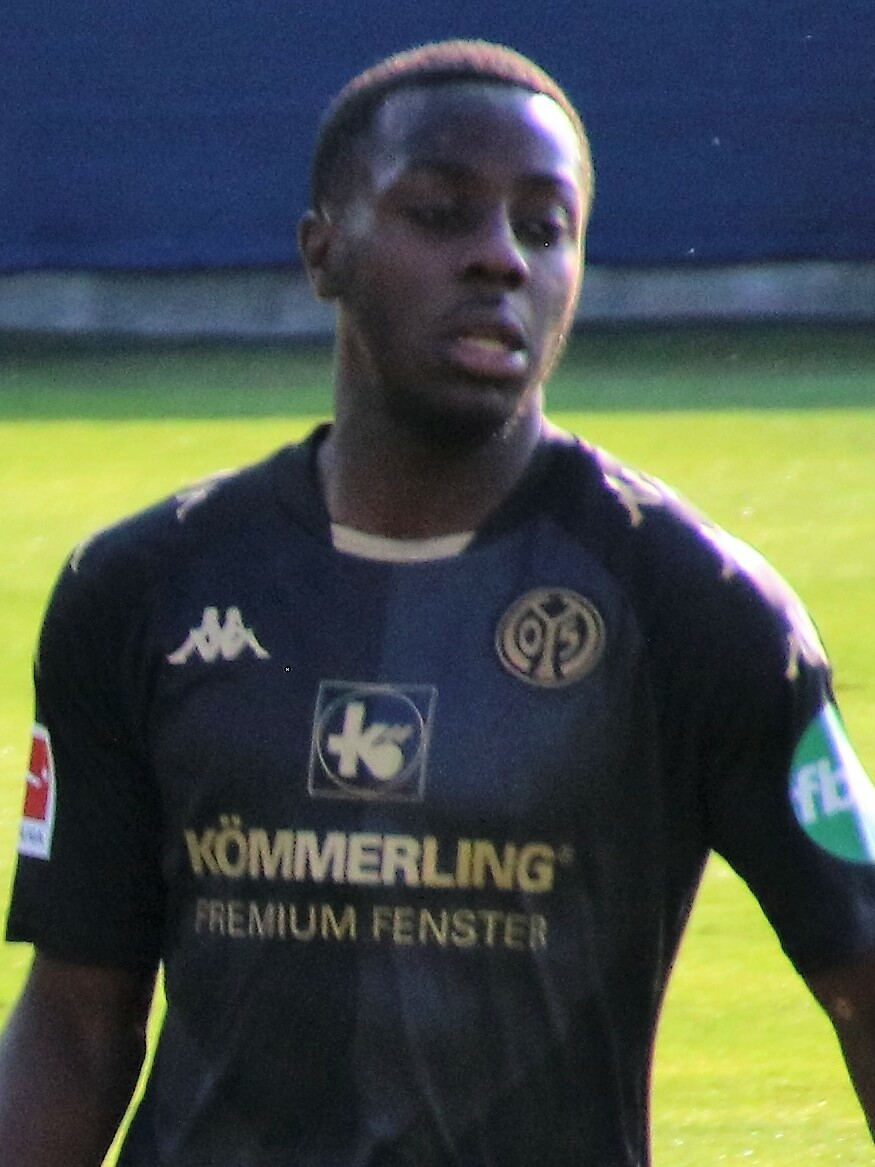
- Papela playing for Mainz 05 in 2021

Personal information
- Full name: Matondo-Merveille Papela
- Date of birth: 18 January 2001 (age 25)
- Place of birth: Mainz, Germany
- Height: 1.74 m (5 ft 9 in)
- Position: Defensive midfielder

Team information
- Current team: Darmstadt 98
- Number: 21

Youth career
- –2011: TSV Schott Mainz
- 2011–2020: Mainz 05

Senior career*
Years	Team	Apps	(Gls)
2019–2022	Mainz 05 II	50	(6)
2019–2024	Mainz 05	17	(0)
2022–2023	→ SV Sandhausen (loan)	19	(2)
2024–	Darmstadt 98	59	(2)

International career
2016	Germany U15	2	(0)
2016–2017	Germany U16	8	(0)
2017–2018	Germany U17	12	(1)
2018–2019	Germany U18	4	(0)
2020	Germany U20	2	(0)
- * Club domestic league appearances and goals as of 18 May 2026

Matondo-Merveille Papela (born 18 January 2001) is a German footballer who plays as a defensive midfielder for 2. Bundesliga club Darmstadt 98.

== Club career ==
Papela made his professional debut for Mainz 05 in the Bundesliga on 3 January 2021, coming on as a substitute in the 89th minute for Phillipp Mwene against Bayern Munich. The away match finished as a 5–2 loss.

On 24 August 2022, Papela joined SV Sandhausen on a season-long loan.

On 20 May 2024, Mainz 05 announced that Papela will leave the club after this season.

On 26 June 2024, Papela signed with Darmstadt 98.

== International career ==
Born in Germany, Papela is of Congolese descent. He has appeared for the Germany under-15 to under-18 and under-20 national teams. He was included in the Germany U17 team for the 2018 UEFA European Under-17 Championship in England. He made three appearances in the tournament, in which Germany were eliminated in the group stage.
