= Antonio Pangallo =

German footballer (born 1990)

Personal information
- Date of birth: 4 February 1990 (age 36)
- Place of birth: Ulm, West Germany
- Height: 1.89 m (6 ft 2 in)
- Positions: Right-back; centre-back

Team information
- Current team: Türkspor Neu-Ulm
- Number: 6

Youth career
- –2000: TV Wiblingen
- 2000–2008: SSV Ulm

Senior career*
Years	Team	Apps	(Gls)
2008–2011	SSV Ulm	54	(0)
2011–2013	Bayern Munich II	52	(2)
2013–2015	FC Augsburg II	34	(0)
2015–2017	SSV Ulm 1846	34	(1)
2017–2020	FV Illertissen	57	(0)
2020–	Türkspor Neu-Ulm	7	(0)
- * Club domestic league appearances and goals as of 30 January 2021

Antonio Pangallo (born 4 February 1990) is an Italian-German footballer who plays as a defender for Türkspor Neu-Ulm.

== Career ==
Pangallo played as a youth for TV Wiblingen, before joining his hometown club, SSV Ulm, in 2000. Eight years later he broke into the first-team, where he made 54 appearances over two and a half years before joining Bayern Munich II in January 2011. He made his 3. Liga debut in a 2–0 defeat against Wacker Burghausen on 22 January 2011. He left Bayern after two and a half seasons and signed for FC Augsburg II shortly afterwards.

== Career statistics ==
As of 29 March 2016

Appearances and goals by club, season and competition
Club	Season	League			Ref.
Club	Season	League	Apps	Goals	Ref.
SSV Ulm	2008–09	Regionalliga Süd	13	0	
SSV Ulm	2009–10	Regionalliga Süd	23	0	
SSV Ulm	2010–11	Regionalliga Süd	18	0	
SSV Ulm	Total		54	0	—
Bayern Munich II	2010–11	3. Liga	18	0	
Bayern Munich II	2011–12	Regionalliga Süd	10	0	
Bayern Munich II	2012–13	Regionalliga Bayern	24	2	
Bayern Munich II	Total		52	2	—
FC Augsburg II	2013–14	Regionalliga Bayern	28	0	
FC Augsburg II	2014–15	Regionalliga Bayern	6	0	
FC Augsburg II	Total		34	0	—
SSV Ulm	2014–15	Oberliga Baden-Württemberg	13	1	
SSV Ulm	2015–16	Oberliga Baden-Württemberg	12	0	
SSV Ulm	Total		25	1	—
Career total			165	3	—
