= Kai Klefisch =

German footballer

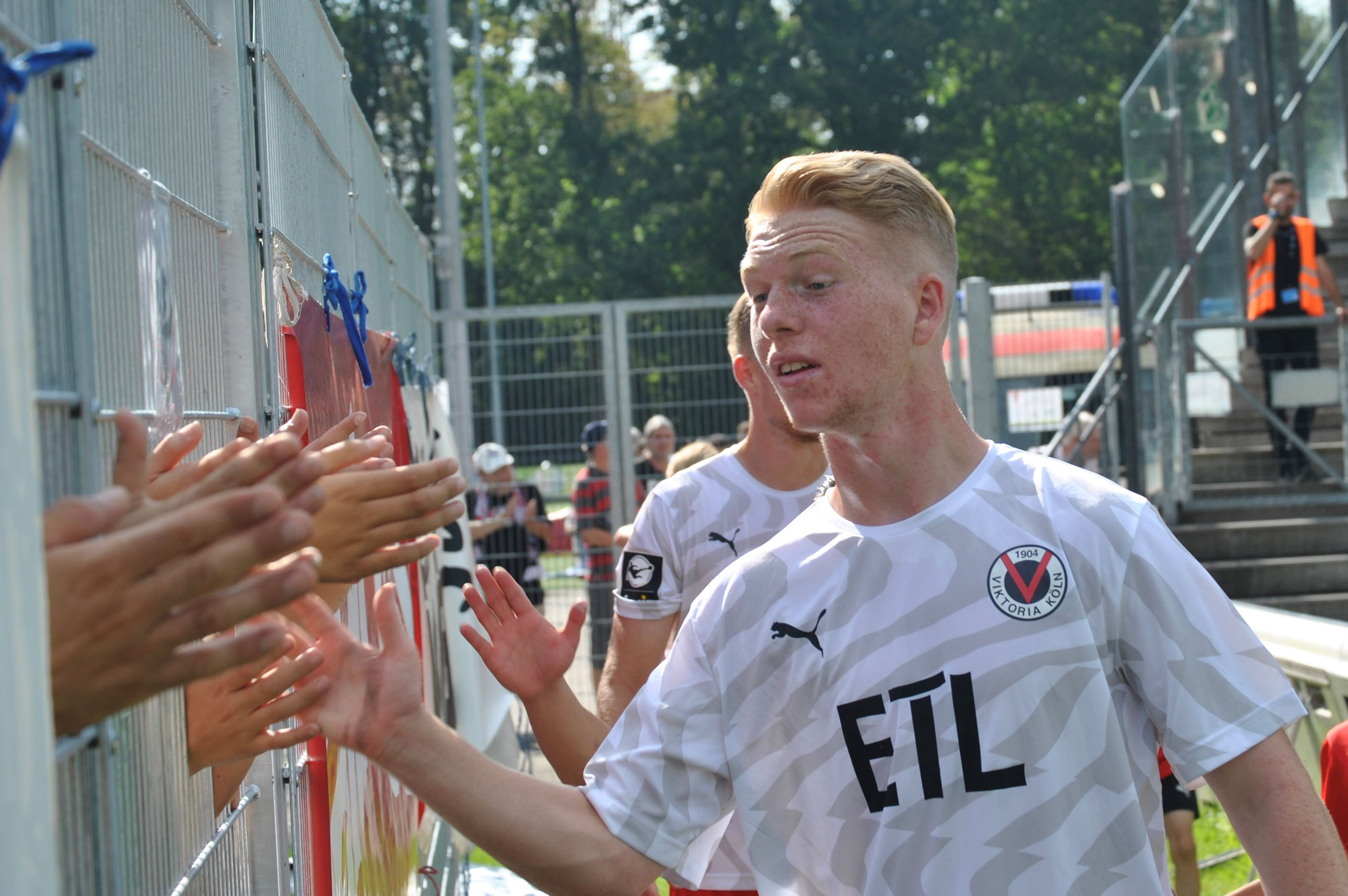
- Klefisch in 2019

Personal information
- Date of birth: 3 December 1999 (age 26)
- Place of birth: Leverkusen, Germany
- Height: 1.86 m (6 ft 1 in)
- Position: Midfielder

Team information
- Current team: Darmstadt 98
- Number: 17

Youth career
- Bayer Leverkusen
- –2018: Viktoria Köln

Senior career*
Years	Team	Apps	(Gls)
2018–2022	Viktoria Köln	103	(5)
2022–2024	SC Paderborn	44	(2)
2024–	Darmstadt 98	53	(3)
- * Club domestic league appearances and goals as of 18 May 2026

Kai Klefisch (born 3 December 1999) is a German professional footballer who plays as a midfielder for 2. Bundesliga club Darmstadt 98.

== Career ==
Klefisch made his 3. Liga debut for Viktoria Köln on 28 July 2019, coming on as a substitute in the 86th minute for Mike Wunderlich in the 3–2 home win against Chemnitzer FC.

On 14 March 2022, Klefisch signed a three-year contract with SC Paderborn, effective 1 July 2022.

On 19 June 2024, Klefisch moved to Darmstadt 98.
