= Bonaventura Genelli =

German painter (1798–1868)

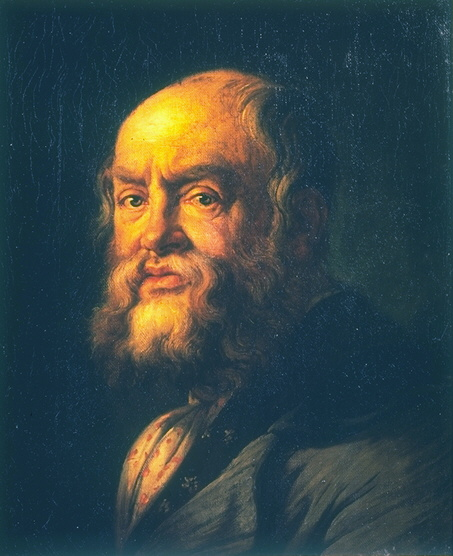
Portrait of Bonaventura Genelli in 1860, by James Marshall (1838–1902)

Giovanni Bonaventura Genelli (28 September 1798 – 13 November 1868) was a German draughtsman and painter.

== Biography ==
Genelli was born in Berlin in 1798. He was the son of Janus Genelli, a painter whose landscapes are still preserved in the Schloss at Berlin; and grandson of Joseph Genelli, a Roman embroiderer employed to found a school of tapestries by Frederick the Great. Genelli's three uncles included an architect, painter, printmaker and porcelain designer between them, and Genelli's son Camillo (1840–1867) was a painter. Bonaventura is mainly remembered for his Neoclassical drawings and prints in an outline style reminiscent of John Flaxman.

Bonaventura Genelli first took lessons from his uncle Hans Christian Genelli who was under the influence of close family friend Asmus Carstens. In 1814–19 he studied at the Prussian Academy of the Arts under Johann Erdmann Hummel. After serving his time in the guards he went on a stipend to Rome in 1822, where he lived for almost ten years. Genelli was a friend and an assistant to landscape painter Joseph Anton Koch, and a colleague of the sculptor Ernst Hähnel (1811–1891) and painters Johann Christian Reinhart, Johann Friedrich Overbeck and Joseph von Führich.

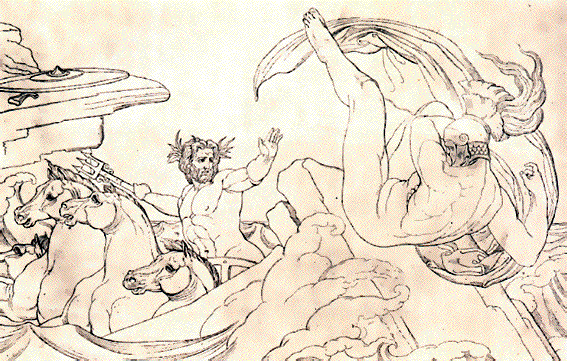
Poseidon and Ajax, a typical Genelli composition

In 1830 Genelli was commissioned by Dr. Härtel to adorn a villa at Leipzig with frescoes, but after quarrelling with this patron he withdrew to Munich, where he earned a scanty livelihood at first, though he succeeded at last in acquiring repute as an illustrative and figure draughtsman. In 1859 he was appointed a professor at Weimar, where he died in 1868.

== Works ==
Genelli painted only fourteen oil paintings, so it is rare to find his canvases in public galleries. Eight are in the Schack collection at Munich. These canvases, plus over 1600 watercolors and designs for engravings and lithographs, reveal Genelli's interest in the antique and a fascination with the works of Michelangelo. Though a German by birth, his spirit was unlike that of Overbeck or Führich, whose art was reminiscent of the old masters of their own country. Genelli seemed to hark back to the land of his fathers and endeavor to revive the traditions of the Italian Renaissance. Subtle in thought and powerfully conceived, his compositions are usually mythological. Impeded by straitened means, the artist seems frequently to have drawn from imagination rather than from life, and much of his anatomy of muscle is in consequence conventional and false. His compositions are nonetheless full of matter, energetic and fiery in execution, and marked almost invariably by daring effects of foreshortening.

His drawing Male Nude was found as part of the Munich Art Hoard.

== See also ==
- List of German painters
