= Antonio Fischer =

German footballer

Personal information
- Date of birth: 9 August 1996 (age 30)
- Place of birth: Rheinfelden, Germany
- Height: 1.75 m (5 ft 9 in)
- Position: Defender

Youth career
- –2016: FC Basel

Senior career*
Years	Team	Apps	(Gls)
2016–2017	FSV Frankfurt	4	(0)
2017	Flamurtari	2	(0)
2018	BSC Old Boys	13	(0)
2019–2022	FC Black Stars Basel	44	(6)
- * Club domestic league appearances and goals as of 03:06, 4 July 2024 (UTC)

Antonio Fischer (born 9 August 1996) is a German professional footballer who most recently played as a defender for Swiss club FC Black Stars Basel.
