= Giuseppe Catizone =

Italian former professional footballer

Personal information
- Date of birth: 20 September 1977 (age 49)
- Place of birth: Waiblingen, West Germany
- Height: 1.80 m (5 ft 11 in)
- Position: Midfielder

Youth career
- –1991: SV Fellbach
- 1991–1995: VfB Stuttgart

Senior career*
Years	Team	Apps	(Gls)
1995–1999	VfB Stuttgart II		
1999–2001	VfB Stuttgart	5	(0)
2001–2002	1. FC Saarbrücken	21	(0)
2002–2005	Stuttgarter Kickers	43	(2)
Total		69	(2)
- * Club domestic league appearances and goals

Giuseppe Catizone (born 20 September 1977 in Waiblingen, Germany) is an Italian former professional footballer who played as a midfielder.

He made his debut on the professional league level in the Bundesliga for VfB Stuttgart on 14 August 1999 when he came on as a substitute in the 68th minute in a game against SV Werder Bremen.

From 2007 he played for lower league side 1. FC Normannia Gmünd.
