= Luca Marseiler =

German footballer

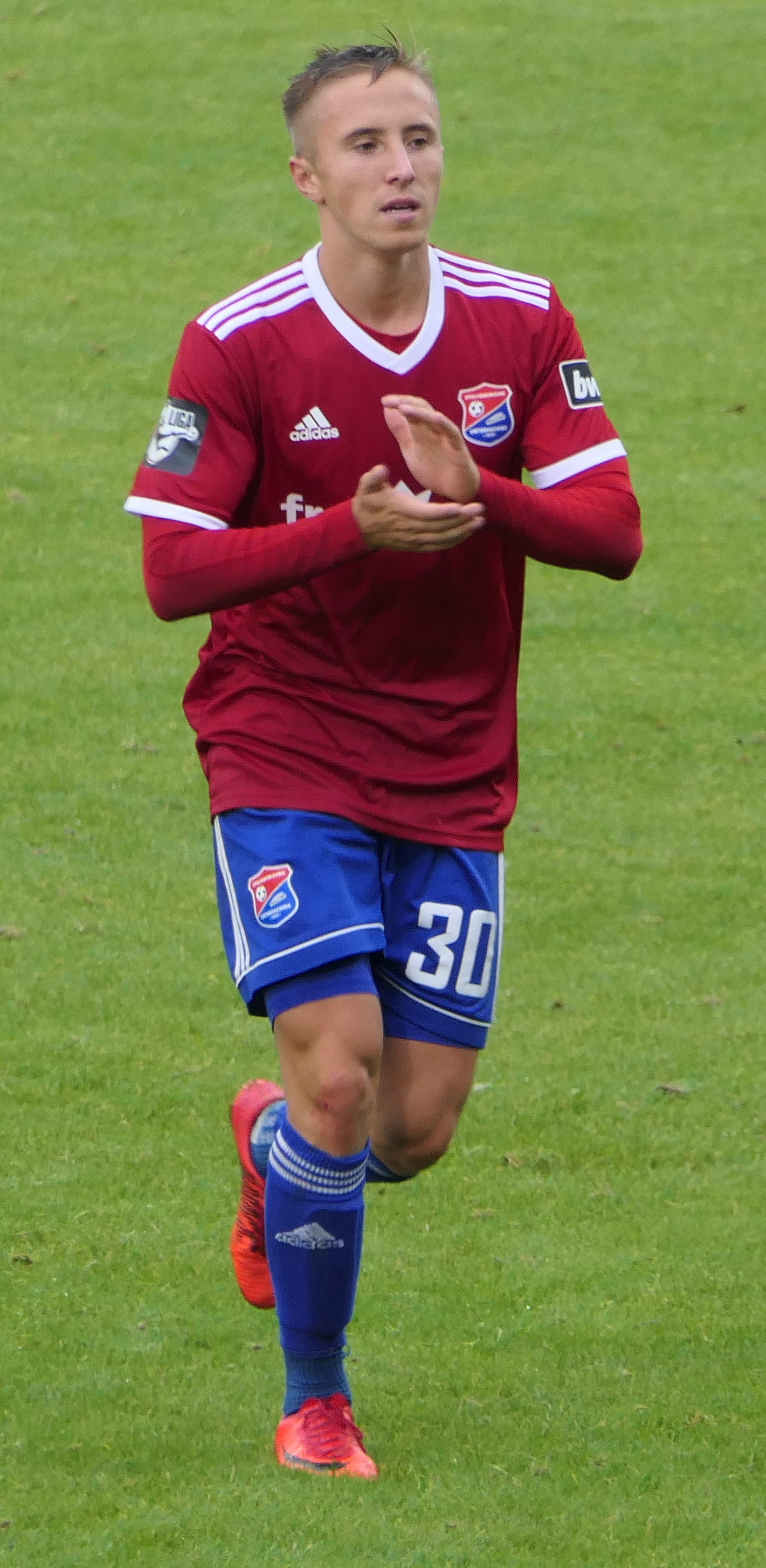
- Marseiler playing for SpVgg Unterhaching in 2018

Personal information
- Date of birth: 18 February 1997 (age 29)
- Place of birth: Munich, Germany
- Height: 1.76 m (5 ft 9 in)
- Position: Midfielder

Team information
- Current team: Darmstadt 98
- Number: 8

Youth career
- SV-DJK Taufkirchen
- Bayern Munich
- –2016: SpVgg Unterhaching

Senior career*
Years	Team	Apps	(Gls)
2014–2015	SpVgg Unterhaching II	10	(1)
2015–2021	SpVgg Unterhaching	112	(14)
2021–2022	SC Paderborn	0	(0)
2021–2022	→ Viktoria Köln (loan)	25	(2)
2022–2024	Viktoria Köln	56	(15)
2024–	Darmstadt 98	57	(5)
- * Club domestic league appearances and goals as of 18 May 2026

Luca Marseiler (born 18 February 1997) is a German professional footballer who plays as a midfielder for 2. Bundesliga club Darmstadt 98.

== Career ==
Marseiler played for SpVgg Unterhaching's reserve team during the 2014–15 season where he scored one goal in ten appearances. He then joined the first team during the 2015–16 season where he scored one goal in 25 competitive appearances. He continued playing for Unterhaching during the 2016–17 season where he scored a goal in 19 competitive matches. Marseiler made his 2017–18 season debut on matchday 23 against Fortuna Köln.

On 14 June 2022, Marseiler moved to Viktoria Köln on a permanent basis after playing for the club on loan in the previous season.

On 16 May 2024, Marseiler signed a contract with Darmstadt 98, effective 1 July.

== Career statistics ==
As of match played on 23 January 2024

Appearances and goals by club, season and competition
Club	Season	League			Cup		Total	
Club	Season	Division	Apps	Goals	Apps	Goals	Apps	Goals
SpVgg Unterhaching II	2014–15	Bayernliga Süd	10	1	—		10	1
SpVgg Unterhaching	2015–16	Regionalliga Bayern	22	1	3	0	25	1
SpVgg Unterhaching	2016–17	Regionalliga Bayern	18	1	1	0	19	1
SpVgg Unterhaching	2017–18	3. Liga	7	0	0	0	7	0
SpVgg Unterhaching	2018–19	3. Liga	29	7	—		29	7
SpVgg Unterhaching	2019–20	3. Liga	12	1	—		12	1
SpVgg Unterhaching	2020–21	3. Liga	26	4	—		26	4
SpVgg Unterhaching	Total		114	14	4	0	118	14
Viktoria Köln	2021–22	3. Liga	25	2	—		25	2
Viktoria Köln	2022–23	3. Liga	24	2	0	0	24	2
Viktoria Köln	2023–24	3. Liga	19	8	2	0	21	8
Viktoria Köln	Total		68	12	2	0	70	12
Career total			192	27	6	0	198	27
