= Giovanni Cannata =

Italian-German footballer

Personal information
- Date of birth: 17 September 1985 (age 41)
- Place of birth: Remscheid, West Germany
- Height: 1.69 m (5 ft 7 in)
- Position: Defender

Youth career
- FC Remscheid
- 2002–2004: Bayer Leverkusen

Senior career*
Years	Team	Apps	(Gls)
2004–2007	Bayer Leverkusen II	50	(0)
2007–2009	Kickers Emden	41	(0)
2009–2010	Rot-Weiss Essen	13	(0)
Total		104	(0)
- * Club domestic league appearances and goals

Giovanni Cannata (born 17 September 1985) is an Italian-German former footballer who played as a defender.
