= 2015–16 Stuttgarter Kickers season =

Stuttgarter Kickers
2015–16 season
- Chairman: Rainer Lorz
- Manager: Horst Steffen(until 4 November 2015); Alfred Kaminski (interim); Tomislav Stipić (caretaker)
- Stadium: Gazi-Stadion auf der Waldau, Stuttgart, BW
- 3. Liga: 18th
- DFB-Pokal: Round 1
- Württemberg Cup: Semi-final
- Top goalscorer: League: Berko (11); All: Berko (11)
- Highest home attendance: 8,000 vs. Dynamo Dresden, 23 September 2015
- Lowest home attendance: 2,750 vs. SV Wehen Wiesbaden, 2 March 2016
- Average home league attendance: 4,578
Home colours	Away colours	Third colours

The 2015–16 Stuttgarter Kickers season is the 116th season in the club's football history. In 2015–16 the club plays in the 3. Liga, the third tier of German football. The club also takes part in the DFB-Pokal and in the 2015–16 edition of the Württemberg Cup.

== Transfers & contracts ==
=== In ===
No.	Pos.	Nat.	Name	Age	EU	Moving from	Type	Transfer Window	Contract ends	Transfer fee	Ref.
5	DF	(Germany)	Manuel Bihr	21	Yes	(Germany) 1. FC Nürnberg	End of contract	Summer	2017	Free	
17	MF	(Lithuania)	Gratas Sirgėdas	20	Yes	(Germany) VfB Stuttgart II	Released	Summer	2017	Free	
24	MF	(Bulgaria)	Edisson Jordanov	22	Yes	(Germany) Borussia Dortmund II	End of contract	Summer	2017	Free	
25	DF	(Italy)	Alessandro Abruscia	24	Yes	(Germany) TSG Hoffenheim II	End of contract	Summer	2016	Free	
26	GK	(Germany)	Rouven Sattelmaier	27	Yes	(Germany) 1. FC Heidenheim	End of contract	Summer	2017	Free	
29	DF	(Germany)	Tobias Pachonik	20	Yes	(Germany) 1. FC Nürnberg	Loan	Summer	2016	Undisclosed	
33	MF	(Germany)	Markus Mendler	22	Yes	(Germany) 1. FC Nürnberg II	End of contract	Summer	2017	Free	
38	GK	(Germany)	Carl Klaus	21	Yes	(Germany) VfL Wolfsburg II	End of contract	Summer	2016	Free	
40	FW	(Germany)	Erich Berko	20	Yes	(Germany) VfB Stuttgart II	End of contract	Summer	2017	Free	
13	MF	(Albania)	Klaus Gjasula	25	No	(Germany) Kickers Offenbach	Transfer	Winter	2017	€50T	
20	FW	(Kosovo)	Bajram Nebihi	26	No	(Germany) 1. FC Union Berlin	Transfer	Winter	2017	Free	
22	MF	(Cameroon)	José-Alex Ikeng	26	No	(Germany) FC Hansa Rostock	Transfer	Winter	2017	Free	
32	FW	(Democratic Republic of the Congo)	Stephané Mvibudulu	21	No	(Germany) TSV 1860 München	Transfer	Winter	2017	Free	
9	FW	(Croatia)	Petar Slišković	23	Yes	(Switzerland) FC Aarau	Transfer	Winter	2017	Free	

=== Out ===
No.	Pos.	Nat.	Name	Age	EU	Moving to	Type	Transfer Window	Transfer fee	Ref.
2	DF	(Germany)	Maximilian Hoffmann	23	Yes		End of contract	Summer		
13	FW	(Canada)	Randy Edwini-Bonsu	25	No	(Germany) VfR Aalen	End of contract	Summer	Free	
14	MF	(Italy)	Umberto Tedesco	23	Yes	(Germany) Stuttgarter Kickers II	Degraded	Summer	n/a	
17	DF	(Germany)	Fabian Gerster	28	Yes	—	Retired	Summer	—	
20	MF	(Kosovo)	Besar Halimi	20	No	(Germany) 1. FSV Mainz 05	Transfer	Summer	Undisclosed	
22	MF	(Greece)	Athanasios Raptis	20	Yes	(Germany) Stuttgarter Kickers II	Degraded	Summer	n/a	
26	DF	(United States)	Royal-Dominique Fennell	26	No	(Germany) FC Würzburger Kickers	End of contract	Summer	Free	
30	GK	(Germany)	Mark Redl	22	Yes	(Germany) Borussia Dortmund II	End of contract	Summer	Free	
32	GK	(Germany)	Tobias Trautner	20	Yes	(Germany) FC 08 Homburg	End of contract	Summer	Free	
19	FW	(Germany)	Daniel Engelbrecht	25	Yes	(Germany) Alemannia Aachen	Released	Winter	Free	
9	FW	(Italy)	Elia Soriano	26	Yes	(Germany) FC Würzburger Kickers	Released	Winter	Free	
18	MF	(Germany)	Marco Gaiser	23	Yes	(Germany) FC 08 Homburg	Loan	Winter	Free	
12	MF	(Romania)	Andreas Ivan	21	Yes	(Germany) Rot-Weiss Essen	Released	Winter	Free	

=== Contracts ===
No.	Player	Status	Contract length	Expiry date	Ref.
5	Manuel Bihr	Transfer	2 years	30 June 2017	
17	Gratas Sirgėdas	Transfer	2 years	30 June 2017	
24	Edisson Jordanov	Transfer	2 years	30 June 2017	
40	Erich Berko	Transfer	2 years	30 June 2017	
25	Alessandro Abruscia	Transfer	1 year	30 June 2016	
26	Rouven Sattelmaier	Transfer	2 years	30 June 2017	
33	Markus Mendler	Transfer	2 years	30 June 2017	
38	Carl Klaus	Transfer	1 year	30 June 2016	
29	Tobias Pachonik	Loan	1 year	30 June 2016	
13	Klaus Gjasula	Transfer	1 year	30 June 2017	
20	Bajram Nebihi	Transfer	1 year	30 June 2017	
22	José-Alex Ikeng	Transfer	1 year	30 June 2017	
32	Stephané Mvibudulu	Transfer	1 year	30 June 2017	
9	Petar Slišković	Transfer	1 year	30 June 2017	

== Matches ==
=== Legend ===
Win Draw Loss Postponed

=== Friendly matches ===
Date	Time^{1}	Stadium	City	Opponent	Result^{2}	Attendance	Goalscorers		Source
Date	Time^{1}	Stadium	City	Opponent	Result^{2}	Attendance	Stuttgarter Kickers	Opponent	Source
Pre–season friendlies
24 June 2015	18:30	Sportplatz Oberndorf	Rottenburg, Germany	TSG Balingen	3-2	600	G. Müller 28'; Berko 44'; Jordanov 87'	Vogler 17', 56'	
3 July 2015	14:00	Julius-Strohmayer-Stadion	Mindelheim, Germany	FV Illertissen	4–0	80	G. Müller 18'; Engelbrecht 68' (pen.), 74'; Fischer 72'	—	
8 July 2015	17:00	Gänsbodenstadion	St. Leonhard in Passeier, Italy	FC Wacker Innsbruck	2-1	350	Berko 12'; Mendler 87'	Mićić 64' (pen.)	
11 July 2015	17:00	Sportpark Reischach	Bruneck, Italy	Inter Milan	3-4	5,000	Fischer 54', 85'; Ivan 90'	Palacio 3', 10'; Brozović 23'; Icardi 29'	
12 July 2015	15:00	Stadion am Weingarten	Gärtringen, Germany	Gym24 & Friends	5-0	1,300	Fischer 12', 14' (pen.); Bangura 42'; G. Müller 79', 89'	—	
15 July 2015	15:00	ADM Sportpark	Stuttgart, Germany	TSG Hoffenheim II	2-2	300	G. Müller 30', 45'	Sessa; Trümmner	
18 July 2015	14:00	Hardtwaldstadion	Sandhausen, Germany	SV Sandhausen	2-2	600	Mendler 27'; Badiane 52'	Bouhaddouz 61' (pen.); Zillner 70'	
11 November 2015	14:00	Sportgelände Zuzenhausen	Zuzenhausen, Germany	TSG Hoffenheim II	3-1		Bahn 15'; Engelbrecht 52'; Fischer 89'	Lohkemper 84'	
13 November 2015	16:00	Sportgelände Erbach	Homburg, Germany	FC 08 Homburg	5-0	200	Starostzik 38'; Berko 52'; Abruscia 60'; Mendler 75'; Soriano 85'	—	
9 January 2016	19:30	Teneriffa Top Training T3	Adeje, Spain	Czech Republic Under-21	0-1	35	—	Linhart 73'	
12 January 2016	20:00	Teneriffa Top Training T3	Adeje, Spain	CD Tenerife B	3-0	43	Bihr 3'; Mvibudulu 54'; Lang 83'	—	
16 January 2016	17:00	Sportanlage Fürth	Fürth, Germany	SpVgg Greuther Fürth II	1-1		Baumgärtel	Guerra 4'	
24 March 2016	15:00	Spieselstadion	Aalen, Germany	VfR Aalen	2-1		Pachonik 68', 83'	Ojala 4'	

- 1.Times in Central European Time/Central European Summer Time
- 2.Kickers goals listed first.

=== 3. Liga ===
==== League fixtures and results ====
MD	Date KO	Venue	Opponent	Res. F–A	Att.	Goalscorers and disciplined players		Table			Ref.
MD	Date KO	Venue	Opponent	Res. F–A	Att.	Stuttgarter Kickers	Opponent	Pos.	Pts.	GD	Ref.
1	25 July 2015; 14:00	H	SC Fortuna Köln	2-1	4,975	Braun 12'; Baumgärtel 52'; Bahn (yellow card) 68'	Uaffero (yellow card) 29' (red card); Biada 57'; Fink (yellow card) 64' (red card)	3	3	+1	
2	1 August 2015; 14:00	A	VfL Osnabrück	1-1	8,633	Braun (yellow card) 19'; Berko 45'; Starostzik (yellow card) 49'; Baumgärtel (yellow card) 62'; Bahn (yellow card) 90' (red card)	Chahed (yellow card) 35'; Pisot (red card) 52'; Kandziora 78'	7	4	+1	
3	15 August 2015; 14:00	A	FC Erzgebirge Aue	0-2	7,250	Badiane (yellow card) 26'; Berko (yellow card) 50'; Marchese (yellow card) 66'; Braun (yellow card) 70'; Klaus (red card) 84'	Breitkreuz (yellow card) 42'; Kluft 36' (yellow card) 57'; Hertner (yellow card) 76' (goal) 86'	12	4	-1	
4	23 August 2015; 14:00	H	VfR Aalen	0-0	5,450	Braun (yellow card) 25'	Schulz (yellow card) 31'; Menig (yellow card) 76'	12	5	-1	
5	26 August 2015; 19:00	A	FC Hansa Rostock	1-0	17,000	Stein (yellow card) 13'; Berko 52' (yellow card) 72'; Klaus (red card) 66'; Marchese (yellow card) 73'; Leutenecker (yellow card) 88' (red card)	Perstaller (yellow card) 11'; Henn (yellow card) 16'; Gardawski (yellow card) 63'; Schuhen (yellow card) 65'; Gottschling (yellow card) 86'	7	8	0	
6	29 August 2015; 14:00	H	FC Energie Cottbus	0-0	3,840	—	Kaufmann (yellow card) 18'; Zeitz (yellow card) 61'; Lück (yellow card) 88'	8	9	0	
7	5 September 2015; 14:00	A	Holstein Kiel	2-1	5,112	G. Müller 34'; Berko 47' (yellow card) 74'; Stein (yellow card) 72'	Schmidt 22'; Schnellhardt (yellow card) 90+5'		12	+1	
8	11 September 2015; 19:00	H	1. FC Magdeburg	1-0	6,270	Braun 36' (yellow card) 62'; Bihr (yellow card) 43'	Butzen (red card) 59'; Löhmannsröben (yellow card) 61'; Puttkammer (yellow card) 67'	4	15	+2	
9	19 September 2015; 14:00	A	SV Wehen Wiesbaden	3-3	2,324	Braun 18' (yellow card) 68'; Badiane 42'; Berko 57'	Schnellbacher 27'; Geyer (yellow card) 34'; Schindler (yellow card) 67'; Lorenz 72' (yellow card) 75'; Funk (yellow card) 79'; Sène 90+3'	5	16	+2	
10	23 September 2015; 19:00	H	SG Dynamo Dresden	1-2	8,000	Jordanov (yellow card) 52'; Bahn (yellow card) 64'; Soriano 78'; Marchese (yellow card) 83'	Eilers 15'; Tekerci (yellow card) 28'; Hartmann (yellow card) 50'; Hefele 65'; J.-P. Müller (yellow card) 90+5'	7	16	+1	
11	26 September 2015; 14:00	A	SC Preußen Münster	2-4	7,648	G. Müller 19'; Stein (yellow card) 42'; Soriano (yellow card) 52'; Bahn (yellow card) 73'; Berko 83'; Fischer (yellow card) 84'	Pischorn (yellow card) 1'; Hoffmann 27'; Reichwein 70'; Krohne 74'; Bischoff (yellow card) 90' (goal) 90+2'	8	16	-1	
12	3 October 2015; 14:00	H	SG Sonnenhof Großaspach	0-4	5,050	Braun (yellow card) 1'; Bihr (yellow card) 34'; Bahn (yellow card) 87'	Breier (yellow card) 3'; Dittgen (yellow card) 15' (goal) 22'; Röttger 56'; Rizzi 74'; Schiek 80'	10	16	-5	
13	17 October 2015; 15:30	A	VfB Stuttgart II	1-2	2,575	Jordanov 47'; Bihr (yellow card) 78'	Grüttner 67' (yellow card) 75'; Rathgeb (yellow card) 38'; Perić (yellow card) 45'; Gabriele 80'; Kiesewetter (yellow card) 90+1'	11	16	-6	
14	24 October 2015; 14:00	H	FC Würzburger Kickers	1-2	4,000	Jordanov (yellow card) 11'; Soriano 23'; Bahn (yellow card) 31'; Baumgärtel (yellow card) 43'; Leutenecker (yellow card) 68'; Bihr (yellow card) 75'	Nagy (yellow card) 32'; Shapourzadeh 38'; Benatelli (yellow card) 43'; Weil 73'	12	16	-7	
15	31 October 2015; 14:00	A	FC Rot-Weiß Erfurt	0-1	4,936	Soriano (yellow card) 32'; Marchese (yellow card) 84'; Leutenecker (yellow card) 90+4'	Uzan 32'; Nikolaou (yellow card) 38'; Judt (yellow card) 59'; Laurito (yellow card) 62'	14	16	-8	
16	7 November 2015; 14:00	H	1. FSV Mainz 05 II	1-4	3,210	Soriano (yellow card) 54' (goal) 63'	Klement 1', 40', 65'; Höler 24'; Parker (yellow card) 28'	18	16	-11	
17	21 November 2015; 14:00	A	Hallescher FC	1-1	5,012	Berko 53'; Gaiser (yellow card) 84'	Acquistapace 77'; Lindenhahn (yellow card) 90'	17	17	-11	
18	28 November 2015; 14:00	H	SV Werder Bremen II	0-2	3,385	Berko (yellow card) 47'	Papunashvili (yellow card) 27'; Hüsing (yellow card) 51'; Guwara 62'; Käuper (yellow card) 63'; Lorenzen 24' (yellow card) 64'; Busch (yellow card) 82'	20	17	-13	
19	5 December 2015; 14:00	A	Chemnitzer FC	0-1	4,768	Pachonik (yellow card) 46'; Soriano (yellow card) 59'; Marchese (yellow card) 72'; Abruscia (yellow card) 80'	Kehl-Gómez (yellow card) 32'; Danneberg (yellow card) 57'; Türpitz (yellow card) 62'; Cincotta 77'	20	17	-14	
20	12 December 2015; 14:00	A	SC Fortuna Köln	1-3	1,618	Stein (yellow card) 34'; Jordanov (yellow card) 39'; Mendler 82'	Oliveira Souza 15'; Biada 35'; Kwame (yellow card) 45'; Schröder (yellow card) 63'; Uaferro (yellow card) 68'; Königs (yellow card) 70' (goal) 78'	20	17	-16	
21	18 December 2015; 19:00	H	VfL Osnabrück	2-2	3,415	Berko 5'; Baumgärtel (yellow card) 72'; Jordanov (yellow card) 76'; G. Müller 89'	Pisot (yellow card) 7'; Syhre 31'; Savran 46'	20	18	-16	
22	22 January 2016; 19:00	H	FC Erzgebirge Aue	1-1	3,800	Berko 27'	Breitkreuz 90+3'	20	19	-16	
23	30 January 2016; 14:00	A	VfR Aalen	0-3	5,176	Braun (yellow card) 30'; Leutenecker (yellow card) 51'; Bihr (yellow card) 54'; Gjasula (yellow card) 87'	Morys (yellow card) 30' (goal) 72'; Ojala (yellow card) 35'; Drexler 75'; Kienle 83'	20	19	-19	
24	6 February 2016; 14:00	H	FC Hansa Rostock	2-0	5,020	Baumgärtel 11' (pen.); Nebihi 65'; Pachonik (yellow card) 89'	Jänicke (yellow card) 66'; Kofler (yellow card) 86'	20	22	-17	
25	13 February 2016; 14:00	A	FC Energie Cottbus	2-1	5,239	Baumgärtel 37' (pen.); Berko (yellow card) 53'; Jordanov (yellow card) 55'; Stein 58'; Gjasula (yellow card) 63'	Lungu (yellow card) 31'; Sukuta-Pasu 34' (yellow card) 41'; Kauko (yellow card) 72'; Michel (yellow card) 77'; Hübener (yellow card) 84'	19	25	-16	
26	19 February 2016; 19:00	H	Holstein Kiel	0-0	3,540	Baumgärtel (yellow card) 26'	Schnellhardt (yellow card) 24'; Heider (yellow card) 40'; Sigurbjörnsson (yellow card) 81'	19	26	-16	
27	28 February 2016; 14:00	A	1. FC Magdeburg	1-2	15,412	Gjasula (yellow card) 36'; Leutenecker (yellow card) 63'; Starostzik (yellow card) 65'; Abruscia 65'	Ernst 2'; Chahed 32'; Kinsombi (yellow card) 64'	19	26	-17	
28	2 March 2016; 19:00	H	SV Wehen Wiesbaden	1-0	2,750	Mvibudulu 71'	Funk (yellow card) 24'; Dams (yellow card) 83'; Schindler (yellow card) 87'	18	29	-16	
29	6 March 2016; 14:00	A	SG Dynamo Dresden	1-1	26,890	Berko (yellow card) 68'; Nebihi (yellow card) 76'	Stefaniak 60'	19	30	-16	
30	12 March 2016; 14:00	H	SC Preußen Münster	1-0	3,530	Abruscia 44'	Tritz (yellow card) 67'	17	33	-15	-->
31	19 March 2016; 14:00	A	SG Sonnenhof Großaspach	1-1	3,600	Berko (yellow card) 7'; Braun 45' (yellow card) 90+3'; Gjasula (yellow card) 64'	Lorch (yellow card) 33'; Gehring (yellow card) 64' (goal) 80'; Hägele (yellow card) 78'; Gäng (red card)	18	34	-15	
32	2 April 2016; 14:00	H	VfB Stuttgart II	4-1	6,980	Kirchhoff 2' (o.g.); Berko 32'; Leutenecker 44'; Abruscia (yellow card) 52' (goal) 67'; Mvibudulu (yellow card) 81'	Kirchhoff (yellow card) 28'; Grüttner (yellow card) 78'; Besuschkow 86'	17	37	-12	
33	9 April 2016; 14:00	A	FC Würzburger Kickers	1-2	5,422	Braun (yellow card) 53'; Leutenecker (yellow card) 67'; Gjasula (yellow card) 72'; Badiane 78'	Shapourzadeh 43' (pen.), 69'; Soriano (yellow card) 85'; Karsanidis (yellow card) 90+2'	17	37	-13	
34	16 April 2016; 14:00	H	FC Rot-Weiß Erfurt	0-1	3,610	Badiane (yellow card) 48'; Baumgärtel (yellow card) 90+1'; Nebihi (yellow card) 90+2'	Möckel (yellow card) 44'; Judt (yellow card) 57'; Aydin 69'; Erb (yellow card) 75'; Nikolaou (yellow card) 78'	18	37	-14	
35	24 April 2016; 14:00	A	1. FSV Mainz 05 II	2-1	989	Berko 59'; Gjasula (yellow card) 65'; Mendler 83'	Bohl (yellow card) 25'; Parker 78'; Häusl (yellow card) 81'	16	40	-13	
36	30 April 2016; 14:00	H	Hallescher FC	1-0	4,270	Berko 37'; Gjasula (yellow card) 59'; Starostzik (yellow card) 64'; Mvibudulu (yellow card) 65'	Lindenhahn (yellow card) 58'; Engelhardt (yellow card) 71'	15	43	-12	
37	7 May 2016; 13:30	A	SV Werder Bremen II	0-1	573	Gjasula (yellow card) 37'; Braun (yellow card) 64'; Badiane (yellow card) 90+1'	Yildirim 52'; Papunashvili (yellow card) 57'	16	43	-13	
38	14 May 2016; 13:30	H	Chemnitzer FC	0-1	5,970	Berko (yellow card) 84'	Steinmann (yellow card) 34'; Bittroff (yellow card) 61'; Fink 87'	18	43	-14	

==== League table ====
Pos	Team	Pld	W	D	L	GF	GA	GD	Pts	Promotion, qualification or relegation
16	Wehen Wiesbaden	38	9	16	13	35	48	−13	43	
17	Werder Bremen II (Note: Reserve teams are ineligible for promotion or DFB-Pokal qualification.)	38	11	10	17	42	56	−14	43	
18	Stuttgarter Kickers (R)	38	11	10	17	38	52	−14	43	Relegation to Regionalliga
19	Energie Cottbus (R)	38	9	14	15	32	52	−20	41	Relegation to Regionalliga
20	VfB Stuttgart II (R)	38	7	10	21	38	63	−25	31	Relegation to Regionalliga

Source: DFB
Rules for classification: 1) Points; 2) Goal difference; 3) Goals scored
(R) Relegated

=== DFB-Pokal ===
Win Draw Loss

Rd	Date KO	Venue	Opponent	Res. F–A	Att.	Goalscorers and disciplined players		Ref.
Rd	Date KO	Venue	Opponent	Res. F–A	Att.	Stuttgarter Kickers	Opponent	Ref.
Round 1	8 August 2015; 15:30	H	VfL Wolfsburg	1-4	9,760	Badiane 80'; Bahn (yellow card) 73'; Gaiser (yellow card) 84'	Kruse 4'; Dost 45'; De Bruyne 47'; Bendtner 86'	

=== Württemberg Cup ===
Win Draw Loss

Rd	Date KO	Venue	Opponent	Res. F–A	Att.	Goalscorers and disciplined players		Ref.
Rd	Date KO	Venue	Opponent	Res. F–A	Att.	Stuttgarter Kickers	Opponent	Ref.
1	Bye							
2	Bye							
3	19 August 2015; 18:30	A	SSV Reutlingen 05	1-0	3,476	Fischer 26'	Seemann (yellow card) 81'; Haas (yellow card) 82'	
R16	15 October 2015; 15:30	A	TSG Backnang	3-1	1,500	Mendler 24', 65'; Soriano 61'; Baumgärtel (yellow card) 71'	Geldner (yellow card) 30'; Biyik (yellow card) 32'; Grimmer 61'	
QF	6 April 2016; 18:30	A	1. FC Heiningen	2-0	1,400	Abruscia 16'; Baumgärtel 59'; Bihr (yellow card) 70'	Hölzli (yellow card) 74'	
SF	27 April 2016; 19:00	A	FSV 08 Bissingen	1-2 (aet)	2,200	Mvibudulu 22'; Mendler (yellow card) 40'; Bihr (yellow card) 62'; Baumgärtel (yellow card) 76'; Braun (yellow card) 80'	Reich (yellow card) 45'; Asch 77' (pen.); Lindner (yellow card) 100' (goal) 109'	

== Team statistics ==
Competition	First match	Last match	Starting round	Final position	Record							
Competition	First match	Last match	Starting round	Final position	G	W	D	L	GF	GA	GD	Win %
3. Liga	25 July 2015	14 May 2016	Matchday 1	18th	38	11	10	17	38	52	−14	28.95
DFB-Pokal	8 August 2015		Round 1		1	0	0	1	1	4	−3	0.00
Württemberg Cup	19 August 2015	27 April 2016	Round 3	Semifinal	4	3	0	1	7	3	+4	75.00
Total					43	14	10	19	46	59	−13	32.56

== Squad information ==
=== Squad and statistics ===
Squad Season 2015–16
No.	Player	Nat.	Birthdate	at Kickers since	previous club	3. Liga		DFB-Pokal		WFV-Pokal	
No.	Player	Nat.	Birthdate	at Kickers since	previous club	App	Gls	App	Gls	App	Gls
Goalkeepers
1	Korbinian Müller	(Germany)	6 February 1991	2014	SpVgg Unterhaching	7	0	0	0	2	0
26	Rouven Sattelmaier	(Germany)	7 August 1987	2015	1. FC Heidenheim	21	0	0	0	1	0
31	Joso Kobaš	(Croatia)	18 October 1995	2015	Junior Team	0	0	0	0	0	0
38	Carl Klaus	(Germany)	16 January 1994	2015	VfL Wolfsburg II	12	0	1	0	1	0
Defenders
4	Hendrik Starostzik	(Germany)	28 March 1991	2014	VfL Bochum II	28	0	1	0	4	0
5	Manuel Bihr	(Germany)	17 September 1993	2015	1. FC Nürnberg	23	0	0	0	3	0
16	Fabio Leutenecker	(Germany)	15 March 1988	2006	Junior Team	33	1	1	0	1	0
21	Marc Stein	(Germany)	7 July 1986	2013	Kickers Offenbach	33	1	0	0	4	0
25	Alessandro Abruscia	(Italy)	12 July 1990	2015	TSG Hoffenheim II	22	3	0	0	3	1
27	Fabian Baumgärtel	(Germany)	7 July 1989	2013	Alemannia Aachen	37	3	1	0	4	1
29	Tobias Pachonik	(Germany)	4 January 1995	2015	1. FC Nürnberg	15	0	0	0	4	0
Midfielders
6	Sandrino Braun (vice-captain)	(Germany)	4 July 1988	2012	SC Pfullendorf	30	4	1	0	4	0
7	Marco Calamita	(Italy)	22 March 1983	2013	VfR Aalen	0	0	0	0	0	0
8	Gerrit Müller	(Germany)	26 April 1984	2013	1. FC Heidenheim	21	3	1	0	0	0
10	Vincenzo Marchese (captain)	(Italy)	19 May 1983	2009	SSV Ulm 1846	19	0	1	0	1	0
13	Klaus Gjasula	(Albania)	14 December 1989	2016	Kickers Offenbach	16	0	0	0	2	0
14	Lasse Lehmann	(Germany)	20 May 1996	2015	Junior Team	2	0	0	0	0	0
17	Gratas Sirgėdas	(Lithuania)	17 December 1994	2015	VfB Stuttgart II	1	0	0	0	0	0
22	José-Alex Ikeng	(Cameroon)	30 January 1988	2017	FC Hansa Rostock	0	0	0	0	0	0
23	Daniel Kaiser	(Germany)	18 October 1990	1994	Junior Team	0	0	0	0	0	0
24	Edisson Jordanov	(Bulgaria)	8 June 1993	2015	Borussia Dortmund II	26	1	0	0	2	0
28	Bentley Baxter Bahn	(Germany)	28 August 1992	2015	FC St. Pauli	20	0	1	0	4	0
33	Markus Mendler	(Germany)	7 January 1993	2015	1. FC Nürnberg II	24	2	1	0	4	2
Forwards
3	Daniel Lang	(Germany)	17 May 1992	2014	Junior Team	1	0	0	0	0	0
9	Petar Slišković	(Croatia)	21 February 1991	2016	FC Aarau	9	0	0	0	1	0
11	Lhadji Badiane	(France)	16 April 1987	2013	Stade Lavallois	22	2	1	1	3	0
20	Bajram Nebihi	(Kosovo)	5 August 1988	2016	1. FC Union Berlin	13	2	0	1	0	0
32	Stephané Mvibudulu	(Democratic Republic of the Congo)	18 May 1993	2016	TSV 1860 München	16	1	0	0	2	1
37	Manuel Fischer	(Germany)	19 September 1989	2015	SG Sonnenhof Großaspach	14	0	1	0	2	1
40	Erich Berko	(Germany)	6 September 1994	2015	VfB Stuttgart II	36	11	1	0	4	0
Players transferred out during the season
9	Elia Soriano	(Italy)	26 June 1989	2013	Karlsruher SC	18	3	0	0	2	1
12	Andreas Ivan	(Romania)	10 January 1995	2012	Junior Team	2	0	1	0	0	0
18	Marco Gaiser	(Germany)	11 January 1993	2011	Junior Team	3	0	1	0	0	0
19	Daniel Engelbrecht	(Germany)	5 November 1990	2013	VfL Bochum	3	0	0	0	1	0

==== Top scorers ====
Rank	Player	Position	3. Liga	DFB-Pokal	WFV-Pokal	Total
1	(Germany) Erich Berko	FW	11	0	0	11
2	(Germany) Sandrino Braun	MF	4	0	0	4
2	(Italy) Elia Soriano	FW	3	0	1	4
2	(Germany) Fabian Baumgärtel	DF	3	0	1	4
2	(Italy) Alessandro Abruscia	DF	3	0	1	4
2	(Germany) Markus Mendler	MF	2	0	2	4
3	(Germany) Gerrit Müller	MF	3	0	0	3
3	(France) Lhadji Badiane	FW	2	1	0	3
4	(Kosovo) Bajram Nebihi	FW	2	0	0	2
4	(Democratic Republic of the Congo) Stephané Mvibudulu	FW	1	0	1	2
5	(Bulgaria) Edisson Jordanov	MF	1	0	0	1
5	(Germany) Marc Stein	DF	1	0	0	1
5	(Germany) Manuel Fischer	FW	0	0	1	1
5	(Germany) Fabio Leutenecker	DF	1	0	0	1
5	Own goal	DF	1	0	0	1
Total			38	1	7	46

=== Penalties ===
All competitions

Player	Penalties
(Germany) Fabian Baumgärtel	4 (1)
(Italy) Vincenzo Marchese	2 (2)

3. Liga

Player	Penalties
(Germany) Fabian Baumgärtel	3 (1)
(Italy) Vincenzo Marchese	2 (2)

Württemberg Cup

Player	Penalties
(Germany) Fabian Baumgärtel	1 (0)

()* = Penalties saved

=== Clean sheets ===
Goalkeeper	Date	Competition	Opponent	Score
Rouven Sattelmaier	19 August 2015	Württemberg Cup	SSV Reutlingen 05	1–0
Rouven Sattelmaier	23 August 2015	3. Liga	VfR Aalen	0–0
Carl Klaus	26 August 2015	3. Liga	FC Hansa Rostock	1–0
Rouven Sattelmaier	26 August 2015	3. Liga	FC Hansa Rostock	1–0
Rouven Sattelmaier	29 August 2015	3. Liga	FC Energie Cottbus	0–0
Rouven Sattelmaier	11 September 2015	3. Liga	1. FC Magdeburg	1–0
Rouven Sattelmaier	6 February 2016	3. Liga	FC Hansa Rostock	2–0
Rouven Sattelmaier	19 February 2016	3. Liga	Holstein Kiel	0–0
Rouven Sattelmaier	2 March 2016	3. Liga	SV Wehen Wiesbaden	1–0
Rouven Sattelmaier	12 March 2016	3. Liga	SC Preußen Münster	1–0
Korbinian Müller	6 April 2016	Württemberg Cup	1. FC Heiningen	2–0
Korbinian Müller	30 April 2016	3. Liga	Hallescher FC	1–0

=== Multi–goal matches ===
Goalscorer	Date	Competition	Opponent	Score
Markus Mendler	10 October 2015	Württemberg Cup	TSG Backnang	3–1

=== Overview of statistics ===
Statistic	Overall	3. Liga	DFB-Pokal	Württemberg Cup
Most appearances	Baumgärtel (41)	Baumgärtel (37)	14 players ^{5} (1)	8 players ^{6} (3)
Most starts	Baumgärtel (40)	Baumgärtel (37)	11 players ^{8} (1)	Pachonik & Bahn (4)
Most substitute appearances	Badiane (15)	Badiane (14)	Badiane, Fischer & Ivan (1)	Baumgärtel (2)
Top goalscorer	Berko (11)	Berko (11)	Badiane (1)	Mendler (2)

=== Discipline ===
==== Cards ====
Player	Total			3. Liga			DFB-Pokal			Württemberg Cup		
Player	Booked	(yellow card) (red card)	Sent off (straight red)	Booked	(yellow card) (red card)	Sent off (straight red)	Booked	(yellow card) (red card)	Sent off (straight red)	Booked	(yellow card) (red card)	Sent off (straight red)
Sandrino Braun	11	0	0	10	0	0	0	0	0	1	0	0
Erich Berko	8	0	0	8	0	0	0	0	0	0	0	0
Klaus Gjasula	8	0	0	8	0	0	0	0	0	0	0	0
Manuel Bihr	7	0	0	5	0	0	0	0	0	2	0	0
Bentley Baxter Bahn	6	1	0	5	1	0	1	0	0	0	0	0
Fabian Baumgärtel	6	0	0	4	0	0	0	0	0	2	0	0
Vincenzo Marchese	5	0	0	5	0	0	0	0	0	0	0	0
Edisson Jordanov	5	0	0	5	0	0	0	0	0	0	0	0
Fabio Leutenecker	5	1	0	5	1	0	0	0	0	0	0	0
Elia Soriano	4	0	0	4	0	0	0	0	0	0	0	0
Marc Stein	4	0	0	4	0	0	0	0	0	0	0	0
Hendrik Starostzik	3	0	0	3	0	0	0	0	0	0	0	0
Lhadji Badiane	3	0	0	3	0	0	0	0	0	0	0	0
Marco Gaiser	2	0	0	1	0	0	1	0	0	0	0	0
Tobias Pachonik	2	0	0	2	0	0	0	0	0	0	0	0
Alessandro Abruscia	2	0	0	2	0	0	0	0	0	0	0	0
Stephané Mvibudulu	2	0	0	2	0	0	0	0	0	0	0	0
Manuel Fischer	1	0	0	1	0	0	0	0	0	0	0	0
Bajram Nebihi	1	0	0	1	0	0	0	0	0	0	0	0
Markus Mendler	1	0	0	0	0	0	0	0	0	1	0	0
Carl Klaus	0	0	2	0	0	2	0	0	0	0	0	0
Totals	86	2	2	78	2	2	2	0	0	6	0	0

==== Suspensions ====
No.	Player	No. of matches served	Reason	Competition served in	Date served	Opponent(s)	Source
28	Bentley Baxter Bahn	1	Yellow-red card vs. VfL Osnabrück	3. Liga	14 August 2015	FC Erzgebirge Aue	
38	Carl Klaus	1	Red card vs. FC Erzgebirge Aue	3. Liga	23 August 2015	VfR Aalen	
38	Carl Klaus	3	Red card vs. FC Hansa Rostock.	3. Liga	26 August 2015	FC Energie Cottbus	
38	Carl Klaus	3	Red card vs. FC Hansa Rostock.	3. Liga	5 September 2015	Holstein Kiel	
38	Carl Klaus	3	Red card vs. FC Hansa Rostock.	3. Liga	11 September 2015	1. FC Magdeburg	
16	Fabio Leutenecker	1	Yellow-red card vs. FC Hansa Rostock	3. Liga	26 August 2015	FC Energie Cottbus	
6	Sandrino Braun	1	Fifth yellow card	3. Liga	23 September 2015	SG Dynamo Dresden	
28	Bentley Baxter Bahn	1	Fifth yellow card	3. Liga	31 October 2015	FC Rot-Weiß Erfurt	
10	Vincenzo Marchese	1	Fifth yellow card	3. Liga	12 December 2015	SC Fortuna Köln	
5	Manuel Bihr	1	Fifth yellow card	3. Liga	6 February 2016	FC Hansa Rostock	
40	Erich Berko	1	Fifth yellow card	3. Liga	19 February 2016	Holstein Kiel	
24	Edisson Jordanov	1	Fifth yellow card	3. Liga	19 February 2016	Holstein Kiel	

== Team kit ==
Home	Away	Third

Type	Shirt	Shorts	Socks	First appearance / info
Home	Blue / White	Blue	Blue	
Away	Black	Black	Black	
Third	Yellow	White	White	

== Reserve team ==
Kickers' reserve team plays in the Oberliga Baden-Württemberg and the coach is Alfred Kaminski.

Note: Flags indicate national team as defined under FIFA eligibility rules; some limited exceptions apply. Players may hold more than one non-FIFA nationality.

No.	Pos.	Nation	Player
1	GK	CRO	Joso Kobas
2	DF	GER	Robin Faber
3	DF	GER	Emmanuel Apler
4	DF	GER	Tim Roos
5	MF	ZIM	Felix Metzler
6	MF	JPN	Taijiro Mori
7	FW	GER	Luca Lippert
8	MF	TUR	Volkan Celiktas
9	FW	GER	Daniel Lang
11	MF	GRE	Athanasios Raptis
12	MF	GER	Janis Lamatsch
13	DF	CRO	Ivan Borna Jelic Balta

No.	Pos.	Nation	Player
14	FW	GER	Nico Schürmann
15	MF	GER	Nico Blank
16	FW	TUR	Burhan Soyudogru
17	MF	GER	Denis Gudzevic
18	MF	ITA	Umberto Tedesco
19	FW	GER	Lasse Lehmann
20	FW	GER	Marco Koch
21	DF	GER	Aris Akgün
22	FW	GRE	Anastasios Ketsemeridis
23	DF	ITA	Marco Romano
24	MF	CRO	Antonio Belobrajdić
30	GK	POL	Mateusz Babieczko

== Technical staff ==
Position	Held by
President	Rainer Lorz
Sporting director	Michael Zeyer
Manager	Tomislav Stipić
Personal assistant	Marcel Hagmann
Goalkeeping coach	Erol Sabanov
Fitness coach	Guido Baur

== Notes ==
- 5.Klaus, Leutenecker, Starostzik, Gaiser, Baumgärtel, Bahn, Marchese, Braun, Mendler, Badiane, G. Müller, Fischer, Berko, Ivan
- 6.Pachonik, Starostzik, Baumgärtel, Abruscia, Braun, Stein, Bahn, Berko, Mendler, Badiane
- 8.Klaus, Leutenecker, Starostzik, Gaiser, Baumgärtel, Bahn, Marchese, Braun, Mendler, G. Müller, Berko
