= 2019–20 SV Darmstadt 98 season =

SV Darmstadt 98
2019–20 season
- Chairman: Klaus Rüdiger Fritsch
- Manager: Dimitrios Grammozis
- Stadium: Merck-Stadion am Böllenfalltor
- 2. Bundesliga: 5th
- DFB-Pokal: Second round
- Top goalscorer: League: Serdar Dursun (16); All: Serdar Dursun (19)
Home colours	Away colours	Third colours

The 2019–20 SV Darmstadt 98 season was the 122nd season in the football club's history and their 20th overall season in the second tier of German football, the 2. Bundesliga. It was the club's third consecutive season in the second division, since relegation from the Bundesliga in 2016-17.

== Squad ==
=== Squad information ===
As of 28 August 2025

Note: Flags indicate national team as defined under FIFA eligibility rules; some limited exceptions apply. Players may hold more than one non-FIFA nationality.

No.	Pos.	Nation	Player
1	GK	GER	Marcel Schuhen (captain)
2	DF	GER	Sergio López
3	DF	RUS	Leon Klassen
5	DF	CRO	Matej Maglica
6	DF	GHA	Patric Pfeiffer
7	FW	SWE	Isac Lidberg
8	FW	GER	Luca Marseiler
9	FW	SCO	Fraser Hornby
10	MF	SUR	Jean-Paul Boëtius
14	DF	MNE	Meldin Drešković
15	MF	BUL	Fabian Nürnberger
16	MF	JPN	Hiroki Akiyama (on loan from Albirex Niigata)
17	MF	GER	Kai Klefisch
19	FW	GER	Fynn Lakenmacher

No.	Pos.	Nation	Player
20	DF	SRB	Aleksandar Vukotić
21	MF	GER	Merveille Papela
22	FW	GER	Serhat-Semih Güler
23	FW	GER	Marco Richter (on loan from Mainz 05)
24	GK	GER	Benedikt Börner
26	DF	GER	Matthias Bader
27	FW	POL	Bartosz Białek
28	MF	GER	Paul Will
30	GK	GER	Alexander Brunst
32	DF	GER	Fabian Holland
34	FW	FRA	Killian Corredor
44	FW	JPN	Yosuke Furukawa
46	DF	GER	Tim Arnold
48	DF	GER	Max Pfister

=== Transfers ===
==== In ====
No.	Pos.	Name	Age	NAT	EU	Moving from	Type	Transfer Window	Contract ends	Transfer fee	Sources
18	Forward	Mathias Honsak	22	Austria	Yes	RB Salzburg	Transfer	Summer	30 June 2022	€750,000	
5	Defender	Mathias Honsak	19	Germany	Yes	Hamburger SV	Transfer	Summer	30 June 2022	€250,000	
33	Forward	Braydon Manu	21	Germany	Yes	Hallescher FC	Transfer	Summer	30 June 2022	€200,000	
27	Forward	Tim Skarke	22	Germany	Yes	1. FC Heidenheim	Transfer	Summer	30 June 2022	€100,000	
2	Defender	Mandela Egbo	21	England	Yes	Borussia Mönchengladbach	Transfer	Summer	30 June 2022	Free	
40	Forward	Erich Berko	24	Germany	Yes	Dynamo Dresden	Transfer	Summer	30 June 2022	Free	
13	Goalkeeper	Carl Klaus	25	Germany	Yes	Atlético Baleares	Transfer	Summer	30 June 2020	Free	
1	Goalkeeper	Marcel Schuhen	26	Germany	Yes	SV Sandhausen	Transfer	Summer	30 June 2022	Free	
8	Midfielder	Fabian Schnellhardt	25	Germany	Yes	MSV Duisburg	Transfer	Summer	30 June 2022	Free	
35	Defender	Dario Dumic	27	Bosnia and Herzegovina	Yes	FC Utrecht	Loan	Summer	30 June 2020	Free	
38	Goalkeeper	Carl Leonhard	18	Germany	Yes	Own youth	Transfer	Summer	30 June 2020	Free	
29	Midfielder	Julian Von Haacke	25	Germany	Yes	FC Utrecht	Loan return	Summer	30 June 2020	-	

==== Out ====
Pos.	Name	Age	NAT	Moving to	Type	Transfer Window	Transfer fee	Sources
Goalkeeper	Daniel Heuer Fernandes	26	Germany	Hamburger SV	Transfer	Summer	€1.3 million	
Midfielder	Selim Gündüz	25	Germany	KFC Uerdingen	Transfer	Summer	Free	
Forward	Orrin McKinze Gaines II	21	Germany	SG Sonnenhof Großaspach	Transfer	Summer	Free	
Defender	Cameron Royo	18	Germany	Viktoria Griesheim	Transfer	Summer	Free	-
Goalkeeper	Josip Galic	19	Germany	Unknown	-	Summer	-	-
Midfielder	Slobodan Medojevic	28	Serbia	Unknown	-	Summer	-	
Forward	Luca Gelzleichter	19	Germany	Alemania Haibach	Transfer	Summer	Free	-
Defender	Sandro Sirigu	30	Germany	Unknown	-	Summer	-	
Defender	Patrick Banggaard	25	Denmark	SönderjyskE	Transfer	Summer	Unknown	
Forward	Sören Bertram	28	Germany	1.FC Magdeburg	Transfer	Summer	Unknown	
Goalkeeper	Max Grün	32	Germany	KFC Uerdingen	Transfer	Summer	Unknown	
Midfielder	Romuald Lacazette	25	France	Free agent	-	Summer	-	
Goalkeeper	Rouven Sattelmaier	31	Germany		End of career	Summer	-	
Defender	Marcel Franke	26	Germany	Norwich City	End of loan	Summer	-	
Midfielder	Christoph Moritz	29	Germany	Hamburger SV	End of loan	Summer	-	-
Midfielder	Tim Rieder	25	Germany	FC Augsburg	End of loan	Summer	-	-

== Competitions ==
=== 2. Bundesliga ===
==== League table ====
Pos	Team	Pld	W	D	L	GF	GA	GD	Pts	Promotion, qualification or relegation
3	1. FC Heidenheim	34	15	10	9	45	36	+9	55	Qualification for promotion play-offs
4	Hamburger SV	34	14	12	8	62	46	+16	54	
5	Darmstadt 98	34	13	13	8	48	43	+5	52	
6	Hannover 96	34	13	9	12	54	49	+5	48	
7	Erzgebirge Aue	34	13	8	13	46	48	−2	47	

Source: DFB
Rules for classification: 1) Points; 2) Goal difference; 3) Goals scored; 4) Head-to-head points; 5) Head-to-head goal difference; 6) Head-to-head away goals scored; 7) Away goals scored; 8) Play-off.

==== Results summary ====
Overall								Home						Away					
Pld	W	D	L	GF	GA	GD	Pts	W	D	L	GF	GA	GD	W	D	L	GF	GA	GD
34	13	13	8	48	43	+5	52	7	9	1	29	18	+11	6	4	7	19	25	−6

Last updated: 5 July 2020.
Source: kicker

==== Matches ====
28 July 2019 1	Hamburger SV	1–1	SV Darmstadt 98	Hamburg
13:30 CEST	Hunt 96'	Report	Skarke 46'	Stadium: Volksparkstadion; Attendance: 44,475; Referee: Robert Hartmann

4 August 2019 2	SV Darmstadt 98	2–0	Holstein Kiel	Darmstadt
15:30 CEST	Skarke 11'; Dursun 64'	Report		Stadium: Merck-Stadion am Böllenfalltor; Attendance: 13,065; Referee: Arne Aarnink

19 August 2019 3	VfL Osnabrück	4–0	SV Darmstadt 98	Osnabrück
20:30 CEST	Amenyido 16'; Wolze 51'; Ouahim 72'; Álvarez 79'	Report		Stadium: Stadion an der Bremer Brücke; Attendance: 14,101; Referee: Patrick Ittrich

23 August 2019 4	SV Darmstadt 98	0–0	Dynamo Dresden	Darmstadt
18:30 CEST		Report		Stadium: Merck-Stadion am Böllenfalltor; Attendance: 14,610; Referee: Matthias Jöllenbeck

30 August 2019 5	SV Sandhausen	1–0	SV Darmstadt 98	Sandhausen
18:30 CEST	Zenga 47'	Report	Pálsson (yellow card) 45+2' (red card) 58'	Stadium: BWT-Stadion am Hardtwald; Attendance: 7,681; Referee: Johann Pfeifer

15 September 2019 6	SV Darmstadt 98	3–3	1. FC Nürnberg	Darmstadt
13:30 CEST	Dursun 6', 82'; Đumić 72'	Report	Hack 9', 85'; Frey 45'	Stadium: Merck-Stadion am Böllenfalltor; Attendance: 15,200; Referee: Alexander Sather

20 September 2019 7	1. FC Heidenheim	1–0	SV Darmstadt 98	Heidenheim an der Brenz
18:30 CEST	Leipertz 59'	Report		Stadium: Voith-Arena; Attendance: 10,800; Referee: Florian Badstübner

28 September 2019 8	VfL Bochum	2–2	SV Darmstadt 98	Bochum
13:00 CEST	Ganvoula 10' (pen.), 25'	Report	Höhn 13', 85'	Stadium: Vonovia-Ruhrstadion; Attendance: 14,321; Referee: René Rohde

4 October 2019 9	SV Darmstadt 98	1–1	Karlsruher SC	Darmstadt
18:30 CEST	Đumić 7'	Report	Philipp Hofmann 9'	Stadium: Merck-Stadion am Böllenfalltor; Attendance: 14,850; Referee: Felix Brych

19 October 2019 10	FC St. Pauli	0–1	SV Darmstadt 98	Hamburg
13:00 CEST		Report	Pálsson 80'	Stadium: Millerntor-Stadion; Attendance: 29,412; Referee: Tobias Reichel

25 October 2019 11	SV Darmstadt 98	1–0	Erzgebirge Aue	Darmstadt
18:30 CEST	Đumić 87'	Report		Stadium: Merck-Stadion am Böllenfalltor; Attendance: 14,095; Referee: Manuel Gräfe

2 November 2019 12	Greuther Fürth	3–1	SV Darmstadt 98	Fürth
13:00 CET	Hrgota 31', 47'; Höhn 37' (o.g.)	Report	Pálsson 87'	Stadium: Sportpark Ronhof Thomas Sommer; Attendance: 8,225; Referee: Harm Osmers

10 November 2019 13	SV Darmstadt 98	2–2	Jahn Regensburg	Darmstadt
13:30 CET	Dursun 88', 90'	Report	Đumić 15' (o.g.); Albers 90+4'	Stadium: Merck-Stadion am Böllenfalltor; Attendance: 13,350; Referee: Alexander Sather

25 November 2019 14	Hannover 96	1–2	SV Darmstadt 98	Hanover
20:30 CET	Haraguchi 14'	Report	Anton 4' (o.g.); Kempe 29'	Stadium: Niedersachsenstadion; Attendance: 22,100; Referee: Martin Thomsen

1 December 2019 15	SV Darmstadt 98	1–3	Arminia Bielefeld	Darmstadt
13:30 CET	Kempe 71'	Report	Klos 48', 49'; Voglsammer 90+2'	Stadium: Merck-Stadion am Böllenfalltor; Attendance: 13,900; Referee: Florian Heft

8 December 2019 16	SV Wehen Wiesbaden	0–0	SV Darmstadt 98	Wiesbaden
13:30 CET		Report	Pálsson (red card) 76'	Stadium: Brita-Arena; Attendance: 8,000; Referee: Matthias Jöllenbeck

16 December 2019 17	SV Darmstadt 98	1–1	VfB Stuttgart	Darmstadt
20:30 CET	Kempe 20'	Report	Sosa 45'	Stadium: Merck-Stadion am Böllenfalltor; Attendance: 14,875; Referee: Patrick Ittrich

21 December 2019 18	SV Darmstadt 98	2–2	Hamburger SV	Darmstadt
13:00 CET	Dursun 32', 58'	Report	Hinterseer 18'; Jatta 45'	Stadium: Merck-Stadion am Böllenfalltor; Attendance: 14,875; Referee: Arne Aarnink

29 January 2020 19	Holstein Kiel	1–1	SV Darmstadt 98	Kiel
20:30 CET	Thesker 30'	Report	Dursun 45'	Stadium: Holstein-Stadion; Attendance: 9,600; Referee: Florian Heft

2 February 2020 20	SV Darmstadt 98	2–2	VfL Osnabrück	Darmstadt
13:30 CET	Dursun 35'; Platte 83'	Report	Álvarez 42' (pen.); Blacha (yellow card) 34' (red card) 64'; Girth 77'	Stadium: Merck-Stadion am Böllenfalltor; Attendance: 14,825; Referee: Lasse Koslowski

7 February 2020 21	Dynamo Dresden	2–3	SV Darmstadt 98	Dresden
18:30 CET	Hušbauer 4'; Schmidt 57'; Makienok (red card) 76'	Report	Paik 8'; Kempe 12'; Dursun 43'	Stadium: Rudolf-Harbig-Stadion; Attendance: 26,243; Referee: Michael Bacher

16 February 2020 22	SV Darmstadt 98	1–0	SV Sandhausen	Darmstadt
13:30 CET	Höhn (yellow card) 16' (red card) 62' (goal) 59'	Report		Stadium: Merck-Stadion am Böllenfalltor; Attendance: 14,310; Referee: Benedikt Kempkes

23 February 2020 23	1. FC Nürnberg	1–2	SV Darmstadt 98	Nuremberg
13:30 CET	Dovedan 30'	Report	Kempe 55' (pen.); Đumić 89'	Stadium: Max-Morlock-Stadion; Attendance: 25,549; Referee: Patrick Alt

29 February 2020 24	SV Darmstadt 98	2–0	1. FC Heidenheim	Darmstadt
13:00 CET	Dursun 11'; Honsak 16'	Report	Hüsing (red card) 90'	Stadium: Merck-Stadion am Böllenfalltor; Attendance: 13,020; Referee: Sven Waschitzki

7 March 2020 25	SV Darmstadt 98	0–0	VfL Bochum	Darmstadt
13:00 CET		Report		Stadium: Merck-Stadion am Böllenfalltor; Attendance: 15,125; Referee: Tobias Reichel

14 March 2020	Karlsruher SC	v	SV Darmstadt 98	Karlsruhe
13:00 CET		Report		Stadium: Wildparkstadion
Note: Match postponed on 13 March 2020 due to outbreak of SARS-CoV-2.

23 March 2020	SV Darmstadt 98	v	FC St. Pauli	Darmstadt
20:30 CET		Report		Stadium: Merck-Stadion am Böllenfalltor
Note: Match postponed on 16 March 2020 due to outbreak of SARS-CoV-2.

5 April 2020	Erzgebirge Aue	v	SV Darmstadt 98	Aue
13:30 CEST				Stadium: Erzgebirgsstadion
Note: Match postponed on 24 March 2020 due to fears over coronavirus pandemic.

12 April 2020	SV Darmstadt 98	v	Greuther Fürth	Darmstadt
				Stadium: Merck-Stadion am Böllenfalltor
Note: Match postponed on 24 March 2020 due to fears over coronavirus pandemic.

19 April 2020	Jahn Regensburg	v	SV Darmstadt 98	Regensburg
				Stadium: Arena Regensburg
Note: Match postponed on 24 March 2020 due to fears over coronavirus pandemic.

26 April 2020	SV Darmstadt 98	v	Hannover 96	Darmstadt
				Stadium: Merck-Stadion am Böllenfalltor
Note: Match postponed on 24 March 2020 due to fears over coronavirus pandemic.

3 May 2020	Arminia Bielefeld	v	SV Darmstadt 98	Bielefeld
				Stadium: Bielefelder Alm
Note: Match postponed on 24 March 2020 due to fears over coronavirus pandemic.

10 May 2020	SV Darmstadt 98	v	Wehen Wiesbaden	Darmstadt
				Stadium: Merck-Stadion am Böllenfalltor
Note: Match postponed on 24 March 2020 due to fears over coronavirus pandemic.

16 May 2020 26	Karlsruher SC	2–0	SV Darmstadt 98	Karlsruhe
13:00 CEST	Hofmann 67'; Wanitzek 90+6'	Report		Stadium: Wildparkstadion; Attendance: 0 (Note: Match played behind closed doors); Referee: Matthias Jöllenbeck

23 May 2020 27	SV Darmstadt 98	4–0	FC St. Pauli	Darmstadt
13:00 CET	Honsak 7'; Stark 74'; Mehlem 78'; Pálsson 89'	Report		Stadium: Merck-Stadion am Böllenfalltor; Attendance: 0 Referee: Benedikt Kempkes

26 May 2020 28	Erzgebirge Aue	1–3	SV Darmstadt 98	Aue
18:30 CEST	Krüger 8'	Report	Kempe 19' (pen.); Dursun 72', 81'	Stadium: Erzgebirgsstadion; Attendance: 0 Referee: Christof Günsch

29 May 2020 29	SV Darmstadt 98	1–1	Greuther Fürth	Darmstadt
18:30 CEST	Schnellhardt 56'	Report	Stefaniak 87'	Stadium: Merck-Stadion am Böllenfalltor; Attendance: 0 Referee: Sven Waschitzki

6 June 2020 30	SSV Jahn Regensburg	3–0	SV Darmstadt 98	Regensburg
13:00 CEST	Correia 7'; Wekesser (yellow card) 33' (red card) 57'; Besuschkow 52'; George 77'	Report		Stadium: Arena Regensburg; Attendance: 0 Referee: Florian Badstübner

14 June 2020 31	SV Darmstadt 98	3–2	Hannover 96	Darmstadt
13:30 CEST	Dursun 24'; Schnellhardt 62'; Pfeiffer 90'	Report	Prib 47'; Ducksch 58'	Stadium: Merck-Stadion am Böllenfalltor; Attendance: 0 Referee: Nicolas Winter

18 June 2020 32	Arminia Bielefeld	1–0	SV Darmstadt 98	Bielefeld
20:30 CEST	Prietl 52'	Report		Stadium: Bielefelder Alm; Attendance: 0 Referee: Benedikt Kempkes

21 June 2020 33	SV Darmstadt 98	3–1	SV Wehen Wiesbaden	Darmstadt
15:30 CEST	Dursun 63'; Paik 77'; Heller 78'	Report	Schäffler 5'	Stadium: Merck-Stadion am Böllenfalltor; Attendance: 0 Referee: Markus Schmidt

28 June 2020 34	VfB Stuttgart	1–3	SV Darmstadt 98	Stuttgart
15:30 CEST	Gómez 42'	Report	Dursun 32'; Bader 53'; Kempe 88'	Stadium: Mercedes-Benz Arena; Attendance: 0 Referee: Bibiana Steinhaus

=== DFB-Pokal ===
11 August 2019 First round	FC Oberneuland	1–6	Darmstadt 98	Bremen
15:30 CEST (UTC+02:00)	Ebrima Jobe 48'	Report	Schnellhardt 32'; Mehlem 38'; Dursun 43' (56), 75'; Skarke 89'	Stadium: Florian Wellmann Stadion; Attendance: 2,353; Referee: Pascal Müller

29 October 2019 Second round	Darmstadt 98	0–1	Karlsruher SC	Darmstadt
20:45 CET		Report	Hofmann 85'	Stadium: Merck-Stadion am Böllenfalltor; Attendance: 11,240; Referee: Florian Badstübner
