= Daniel Lang =

Daniel Lang may refer to:

== People ==
- Daniel Lang (writer) (1913–1981), writer (Casualties of War)
- Daniel Lang (Ontario politician) (1919–1997), Canadian senator and lawyer from Ontario
- Daniel Lang (Yukon politician) (born 1948), Canadian senator from Yukon
- Daniel Lang (fencer) (born 1971), Swiss fencer
- Daniel Lang (footballer) (born 1992), German footballer

== Fiction ==
- Dan Lang, a character in the 1983 novel series Vampire Hunter D

== See also ==
- Danny Lange (born 1962), software developer
