= Serdar Dursun =

Turkish footballer (born 1991)

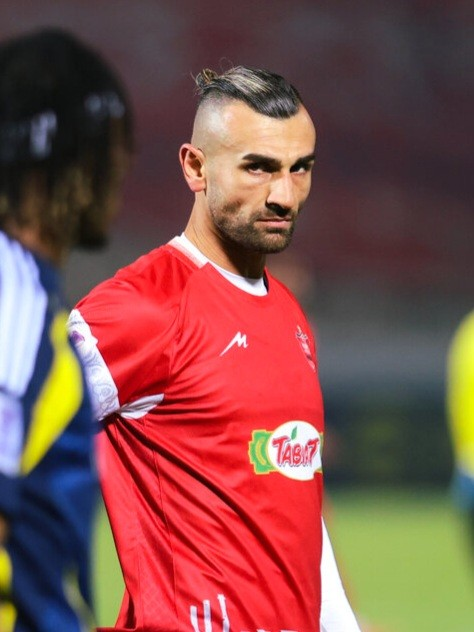
- Dursun with Persepolis in 2025

Personal information
- Date of birth: 19 October 1991 (age 35)
- Place of birth: Hamburg, Germany
- Height: 1.90 m (6 ft 3 in)
- Position: Striker

Team information
- Current team: Gaziantep
- Number: 19

Youth career
- 1998–2004: Lorbeer Rothenburgsort
- 2004–2005: Vorwärts-Wacker 04
- 2005–2008: Concordia Hamburg
- 2008–2010: Hannover 96

Senior career*
Years	Team	Apps	(Gls)
2010–2011	Hannover 96 II	27	(5)
2011–2014	Eskişehirspor	1	(0)
2013	→ Şanlıurfaspor (loan)	5	(0)
2013–2014	→ Denizlispor (loan)	16	(2)
2014–2016	Fatih Karagümrük	61	(16)
2016–2018	Greuther Fürth	59	(13)
2018–2021	Darmstadt 98	100	(54)
2021–2023	Fenerbahçe	51	(16)
2023–2024	Fatih Karagümrük	22	(3)
2024	→ Fenerbahçe (loan)	9	(3)
2024–2025	Alanyaspor	12	(0)
2025	Persepolis	12	(5)
2025–2026	Kocaelispor	28	(6)
2026–	Gaziantep	5	(0)

International career
2021–2022	Turkey	10	(7)
- * Club domestic league appearances and goals as of 11 October 2026

Serdar Dursun (born 19 October 1991) is a professional footballer who plays as a striker for Süper Lig club Gaziantep. Born in Germany, he played for the Turkey national team.

== Career ==
Dursun began his senior career with the reserves of Hannover 96 in 2010, and moved to Turkey thereafter with Eskişehirspor. From Eskişehirspor, he had two short loans with Şanlıurfaspor and Denizlispor before transferring to Karagümrük in 2014. In 2016, he returned to Germany with Greuther Fürth and then Darmstadt 98 in 2018.

Dursun completed 2020–21 2. Bundesliga season with 27 goals, making him the top-scorer of the season.

=== Fenerbahçe ===
On 15 June 2021, Dursun signed a three-year deal with option for fourth with Turkish side Fenerbahçe. He made his debut on 26 September in a 2–1 away win over Hatayspor. He scored his first goal for the club on 24 October in a 2–1 home loss against Alanyaspor. On 5 December, he scored a hat-trick in a 4–0 win over Çaykur Rizespor.

On 12 February 2022, in a 2–1 win over Giresunspor, Dursun, who entered the game in the second half of the match, suffered a head injury in the 51st minute of the match and was only able to play 7 minutes, being replaced by Mërgim Berisha in the 58th minute. Fenerbahçe stated that it was determined that a displaced fracture occurred in his zygomatic bone after the blow he received in the match.

=== Persepolis ===
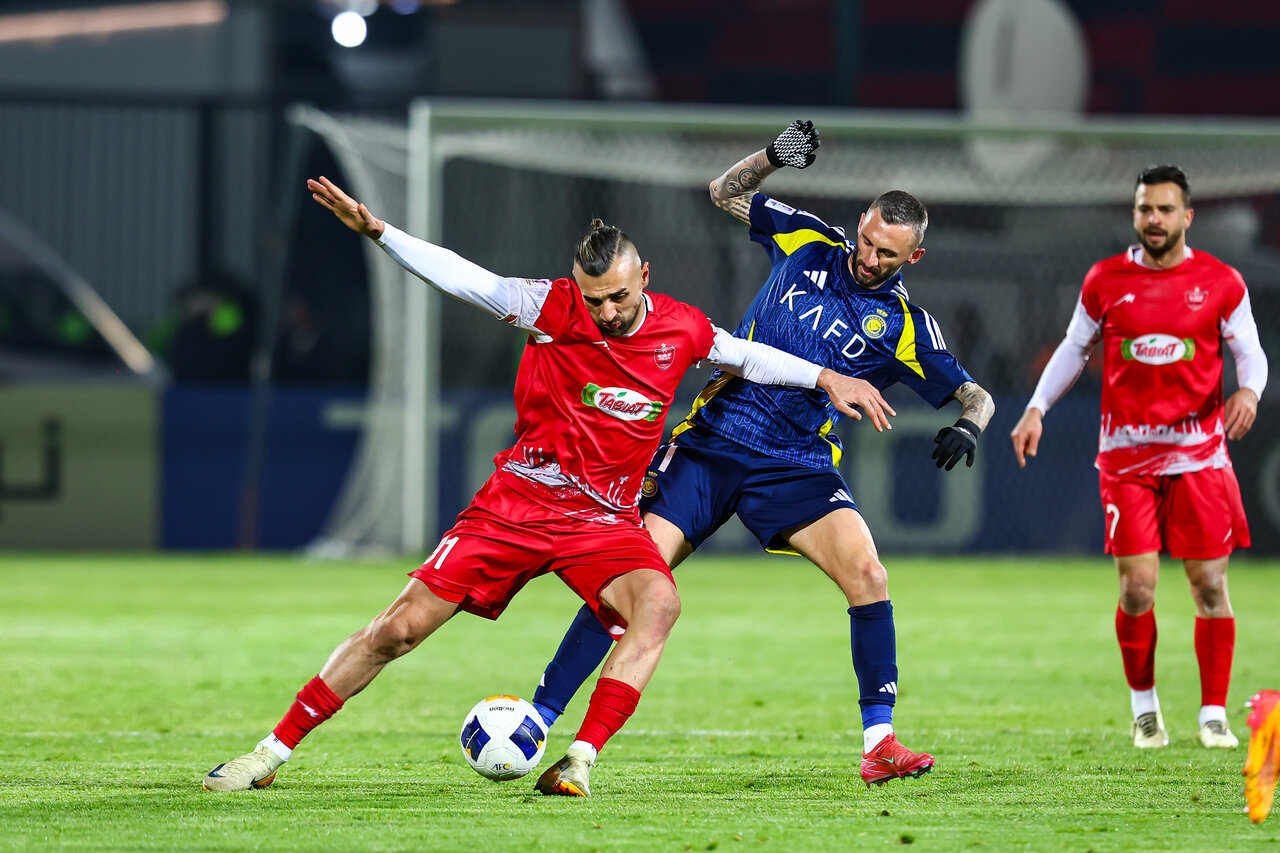
Dursun playing for Persepolis in 2025

On 31 January 2025, Dursun joined Persian Gulf Pro League champions Persepolis on a 18-month deal.

== International career ==
Born in Germany, Dursun is of Turkish descent. He debuted with the Turkey national team as a late sub in a 2–1 2022 FIFA World Cup qualification win over Latvia on 11 October 2021, scoring his side's first goal in the 75th minute.

== Career statistics ==
=== Club ===
As of match played 15 May 2025

Appearances and goals by club, season and competition
Club	Season	League			National cup (Note: Includes DFB-Pokal, Turkish Cup, Hazfi Cup)		Continental		Total	
Club	Season	Division	Apps	Goals	Apps	Goals	Apps	Goals	Apps	Goals
Hannover 96 II	2010–11	Regionalliga Nord	27	5	—		—		27	5
Eskişehirspor	2011–12	Süper Lig	1	0	0	0	—		1	0
Eskişehirspor	2012–13	Süper Lig	0	0	1	0	—		1	0
Eskişehirspor	Total		1	0	1	0	—		2	0
Şanlıurfaspor (loan)	2012–13	TFF First League	5	0	0	0	—		5	0
Denizlispor (loan)	2013–14	TFF First League	16	2	0	0	—		16	2
Karagümrük	2014–15	TFF Second League	31	10	8	2	—		39	12
Karagümrük	2015–16	TFF Second League	30	6	1	1	—		31	7
Karagümrük	Total		61	16	9	3	—		70	19
Greuther Fürth	2016–17	2. Bundesliga	32	10	3	1	—		35	11
Greuther Fürth	2017–18	2. Bundesliga	27	3	2	1	—		29	4
Greuther Fürth	Total		59	13	5	2	—		64	15
Darmstadt 98	2018–19	2. Bundesliga	33	11	2	0	—		35	11
Darmstadt 98	2019–20	2. Bundesliga	34	16	2	3	—		36	19
Darmstadt 98	2020–21	2. Bundesliga	33	27	3	2	—		36	29
Darmstadt 98	Total		100	54	7	5	—		107	59
Fenerbahçe	2021–22	Süper Lig	33	15	2	0	2 (Note: Appearance(s) in UEFA Europa Conference League)	0	37	15
Fenerbahçe	2022–23	Süper Lig	18	1	2	1	6 (Note: Two appearances in UEFA Champions League, four appearances and two goals in UEFA Europa League)	2	26	4
Fenerbahçe	2023–24	Süper Lig	0	0	0	0	1	0	1	0
Fenerbahçe	Total		51	16	4	1	9	2	64	19
Fatih Karagümrük	2023–24	Süper Lig	22	3	2	3	—		24	6
Fenerbahçe (loan)	2023–24	Süper Lig	7	2	1	0	0	0	8	2
Persepolis	2024–25	Persian Gulf Pro League	12	5	1	0	2 (Note: Appearances in AFC Champions League Elite)	0	15	5
Career total			360	116	30	15	11	2	402	131

=== International ===
As of match played 14 November 2022

Appearances and goals by national team and year
National team	Year	Apps	Goals
Turkey	2021	2	2
Turkey	2022	8	5
Total		10	7

As of match played 11 June 2022
Scores and results list Turkey's goal tally first, score column indicates score after each Dursun goal.

List of international goals scored by Serdar Dursun
No.	Date	Venue	Cap	Opponent	Score	Result	Competition
1	11 October 2021	Daugava Stadium, Riga, Latvia	1	Latvia	1–1	2–1	2022 FIFA World Cup qualification
2	13 November 2021	Başakşehir Fatih Terim Stadium, Istanbul, Turkey	2	Gibraltar	5–0	6–0	2022 FIFA World Cup qualification
3	29 March 2022	Büyükşehir Stadium, Konya, Turkey	4	Italy	2–3	2–3	Friendly
4	4 June 2022	Başakşehir Fatih Terim Stadium, Istanbul, Turkey	5	Faroe Islands	3–0	4–0	2022–23 UEFA Nations League C
5	7 June 2022	LFF Stadium, Vilnius, Lithuania	6	Lithuania	3–0	6–0	2022–23 UEFA Nations League C
6	7 June 2022	LFF Stadium, Vilnius, Lithuania	6	Lithuania	4–0	6–0	2022–23 UEFA Nations League C
7	11 June 2022	Stade de Luxembourg, Luxembourg City, Luxembourg	7	Luxembourg	2–0	2–0	2022–23 UEFA Nations League C

== Honours ==
Fenerbahçe

- Turkish Cup: 2022–23

Individual

- 2. Bundesliga top scorer: 2020–21
