= Felix Platte =

German footballer

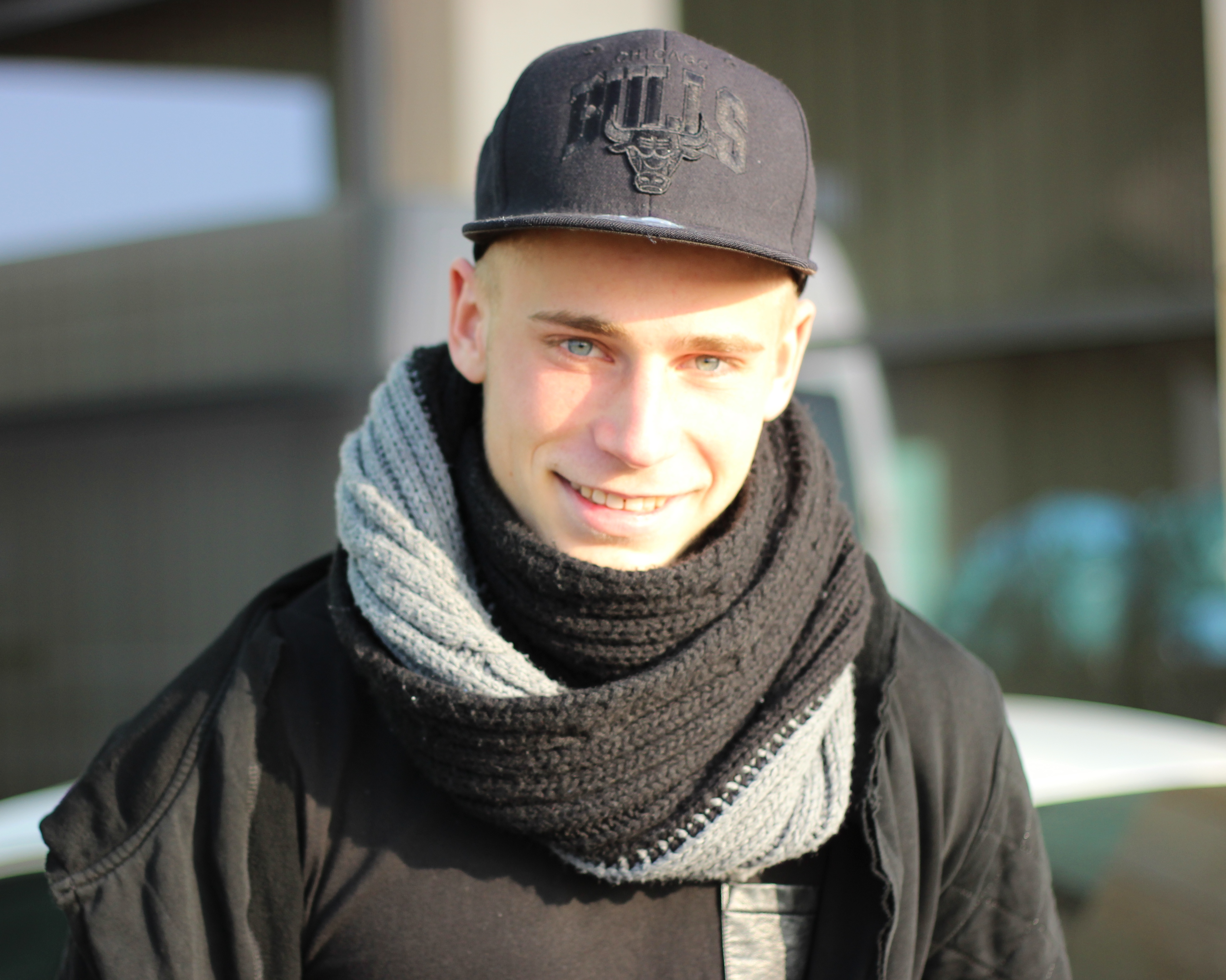
- Platte in 2015

Personal information
- Date of birth: 11 February 1996 (age 30)
- Place of birth: Höxter, Germany
- Height: 1.90 m (6 ft 3 in)
- Position: Striker

Team information
- Current team: Persepolis
- Number: 99

Youth career
- 2000–2008: TSV Sabbenhausen
- 2008–2009: TuS WE Lügde
- 2009–2012: SC Paderborn
- 2012–2015: Schalke 04

Senior career*
Years	Team	Apps	(Gls)
2015–2017	Schalke 04	3	(0)
2015	Schalke 04 II	3	(1)
2016–2017	→ Darmstadt 98 (loan)	20	(2)
2017–2021	Darmstadt 98	65	(9)
2021–2025	SC Paderborn	75	(20)

International career^{‡}
2016–2017	Germany U20	2	(0)
2017	Germany U21	3	(1)
Medal record
UEFA European Under-21 Championship
Winner	2017
- * Club domestic league appearances and goals as of 23 May 2025 ‡ National team caps and goals as of 10 October 2017

Felix Platte (born 11 February 1996) is a German professional footballer who plays as a striker.

== Club career ==
=== Schalke 04 ===
Platte joined the youth academy (Nachwuchsleistungszentrum) of Schalke 04 in 2012 from SC Paderborn 07 and attended the Gesamtschule Berger Feld. He made his Bundesliga debut on 14 February 2015 against Eintracht Frankfurt in a 1–0 away defeat. He replaced Kevin-Prince Boateng after 79 minutes. He then put on a great performance, and nearly leveled the scores – if it was not for the crossbar – against defending champions Real Madrid in the Champions League knockout stage after coming on early in the first half for injured hit-man Klaas-Jan Huntelaar.

==== Loan to Darmstadt 98 ====
He was loaned to Darmstadt 98 on 1 February 2016.

=== Darmstadt 98 ===
On 26 August 2017, Darmstadt 98 announced the permanent capture of Platte on a four-year contract.

== International career ==
Platte is a German youth international.

== Career statistics ==
As of 1 July 2021

Appearances and goals by club, season and competition
Club	Season	League			Cup		Europe^{1}		Total	
Club	Season	Division	Apps	Goals	Apps	Goals	Apps	Goals	Apps	Goals
Schalke 04	2014–15	Bundesliga	2	0	0	0	1	0	3	0
Schalke 04	2015–16	Bundesliga	1	0	0	0	0	0	1	0
Schalke 04	Total		3	0	0	0	1	0	4	0
Schalke 04 II	2015–16	Regionalliga West	3	1	—		—		3	1
Darmstadt 98 (loan)	2015–16	Bundesliga	11	0	0	0	—		11	0
Darmstadt 98 (loan)	2016–17	Bundesliga	9	2	0	0	—		9	2
Darmstadt 98 (loan)	Total		20	2	0	0	—		20	2
Darmstadt 98	2017–18	2. Bundesliga	21	5	0	0	—		21	5
Darmstadt 98	2018–19	2. Bundesliga	10	1	0	0	—		10	1
Darmstadt 98	2019–20	2. Bundesliga	13	1	0	0	—		13	1
Darmstadt 98	2020–21	2. Bundesliga	21	2	3	0	—		24	2
Darmstadt 98	Total		65	9	3	0	—		68	9
Career total			91	12	3	0	1	0	95	12

- 1.Includes UEFA Champions League.

== Honours ==
Germany

- UEFA European Under-21 Championship: 2017
