= 2020–21 SV Darmstadt 98 season =

SV Darmstadt 98
2020–21 season
- Chairman: Klaus Rüdiger Fritsch
- Manager: Dimitrios Grammozis
- Stadium: Merck-Stadion am Böllenfalltor
- 2. Bundesliga: 7th
- DFB-Pokal: Round of 16
- Top goalscorer: League: Serdar Dursun (21); All: Serdar Dursun (23)
Home colours	Away colours	Third colours

The 2020–21 SV Darmstadt 98 season is the 123rd season in the football club's history and their 21st overall season in the second tier of German football, the 2. Bundesliga. It is the club's fourth consecutive season in the second division, since relegation from the Bundesliga in 2016–17. In addition to the domestic league, Darmstadt also participated in this season's edition of the DFB-Pokal. The season covers the period from 1 July 2020 to 30 June 2021.

== Squad ==
=== Squad information ===
As of 6 September 2020

Note: Flags indicate national team as defined under FIFA eligibility rules; some limited exceptions apply. Players may hold more than one non-FIFA nationality.

No.	Pos.	Nation	Player
1	GK	GER	Marcel Schuhen
4	MF	ISL	Victor Pálsson
5	DF	GER	Patric Pfeiffer
6	MF	GER	Marvin Mehlem
7	FW	GER	Felix Platte
8	MF	GER	Fabian Schnellhardt
11	MF	GER	Tobias Kempe
13	GK	GER	Carl Klaus
14	MF	KOR	Paik Seung-ho
15	DF	GER	Mathias Wittek
17	DF	GER	Lars Lukas Mai (on loan from Bayern Munich)
18	MF	AUT	Mathias Honsak
19	FW	TUR	Serdar Dursun
21	DF	GER	Immanuel Höhn

No.	Pos.	Nation	Player
22	FW	GER	Aaron Seydel
23	DF	GER	Nicolai Rapp (on loan from Union Berlin)
26	DF	GER	Matthias Bader
27	MF	GER	Tim Skarke
29	FW	GER	Henry Crosthwaite
30	MF	POL	Adrian Stanilewicz
31	GK	GER	Florian Stritzel
32	DF	GER	Fabian Holland (Captain)
33	MF	GER	Braydon Manu
36	DF	GER	Silas Zehnder
37	DF	GER	Patrick Herrmann
39	FW	GER	Ensar Arslan
40	FW	GER	Erich Berko

== Competitions ==
=== Bundesliga ===
==== League table ====
Pos	Team	Pld	W	D	L	GF	GA	GD	Pts
5	Fortuna Düsseldorf	34	16	8	10	55	46	+9	56
6	Karlsruher SC	34	14	10	10	51	44	+7	52
7	Darmstadt 98	34	15	6	13	63	55	+8	51
8	1. FC Heidenheim	34	15	6	13	49	49	0	51
9	SC Paderborn	34	12	11	11	53	45	+8	47

Source: DFB
Rules for classification: 1) Points; 2) Goal difference; 3) Goals scored; 4) Head-to-head points; 5) Head-to-head goal difference; 6) Head-to-head away goals scored; 7) Away goals scored; 8) Play-off.

==== Matches ====
2. Bundesliga match details
Match	Date	Time	Opponent	Venue	Result F–A	Scorers	Attendance	League position	Ref.
1	19 September 2020	13:00	SV Sandhausen	Away	2–3	Honsak 19', Skarke 90+4'	754		
2	26 September 2020	13:00	Jahn Regensburg	Home	0–0		1,721		
3	5 October 2020	20:30	1. FC Nürnberg	Away	3–2	Dursun 55', Mehlem 76', Rapp 90+3'	6,772		
5	24 October 2020	13:00	FC St. Pauli	Home	2–2	Dursun 45' pen., 76'	0 (Note: Match played behind closed doors due to COVID-19 pandemic.)		
4	28 October 2020	18:30	VfL Osnabrück	Away	1–1	Pálsson 30'	0		
6	1 November 2020	13:30	Karlsruher SC	Away	4–3	Kempe 9', 90+3' pen., Pálsson 65', Dursun 77'	0		
7	8 November 2020	13:30	SC Paderborn	Home	0–4		0		
8	22 November 2020	13:30	Erzgebirge Aue	Away	0–3		0		
9	27 November 2020	18:30	Eintracht Braunschweig	Home	4–0	Kempe 6' pen., 36' pen., Dursun 7', 33'	0		
10	4 December 2020	18:30	Fortuna Düsseldorf	Away	2–3	Dursun 50', Kempe 67' pen.	0		
11	12 December 2020	13:00	Hamburger SV	Home	1–2	Kempe 78'	0		
12	15 December 2020	18:30	Greuther Fürth	Away	4–0	Skarke 17', Dursun 45', 49', Höhn 76'	0		
13	19 December 2020	13:00	Würzburger Kickers	Home	2–0	Kempe 55', Platte 90+4'	0		
14	2 January 2021	13:00	VfL Bochum	Away	1–2	Kempe 80'	0		
15	10 January 2021	13:30	Hannover 96	Home	1–2	Seydel 68'	0		
16	17 January 2021	13:30	1. FC Heidenheim	Away	0–3		0		
17	24 January 2021	13:30	Holstein Kiel	Home	0–2		0		
18	27 January 2021	18:30	Sandhausen	Home	2–1	Mehlem 36', 48'	0		
19	30 January 2021	13:00	Jahn Regensburg	Away	1–1	Skarke 30'	0		
20	6 February 2021	13:00	1. FC Nürnberg	Home	1–2	Holland 90' pen.	0	13th	
21	14 February 2021	13:30	VfL Osnabrück	Home	1–0	Honsak 33'	0	12th	
22	20 February 2021	13:00	FC St. Pauli	Away	2–3	Skarke 64', Dursun 66'	0	14th	
23	26 February 2021	18:30	Karlsruher SC	Home	0–1		0	14th	
24	5 March 2021	18:30	SC Paderborn	Away	3–2	Dursun 20' pen., 75', Mehlem 68'	0	13th	
25	13 March 2021	13:00	Erzgebirge Aue	Home	4–1	Dursun 4', 27', 67', Honsak 90+1'	0	12th	
26	20 March 2021	13:00	Eintracht Braunschweig	Away	1–1	Pálsson 13'	0	12th	
27	4 April 2021	13:30	Fortuna Düsseldorf	Home	1–2	Dursun 37' pen.	0	12th	
28	9 April 2021	18:30	Hamburger SV	Away	2–1	Berko 51', Dursun 60'	0	12th	
29	16 April 2021	18:30	Greuther Fürth	Home	2–2	Kempe 2', Dursun 40'	0	12th	
30	20 April 2021	18:30	Würzburger Kickers	Away	3–1	Dursun 45+1 pen., Skarke 79', Platte 90+3'	0	11th	
31	26 April 2021	20:30	VfL Bochum	Home	3–1	Clemens 79', Dursun 81', 86'	0	10th	
32	7 May 2021	18:30	Hannover 96	Away	2–1	Mehlem 55', Honsak 68'	0	10th	
33	16 May 2021	15:30	1. FC Heidenheim	Home	5–1	Rapp 18', Dursun 40', 54', 59', 83'	0	8th	
34	23 May 2021	15:30	Holstein Kiel	Away	3–2	Dursun 51', 58', Höhn 75'	0	7th	

=== DFB-Pokal ===
DFB-Pokal match details
Round	Date	Time	Opponent	Venue	Result F–A	Scorers	Attendance	Ref.
First round	13 September 2020	18:30	1. FC Magdeburg	Away	3–2 (a.e.t.)	Mehlem 53', Kempe 66', Honsak 100'	5,000	
Second round	22 December 2020	20:45	Dynamo Dresden	Away	3–0	Schnellhardt 24', Paik 59', Dursun 71'	0	
Round of 16	2 February 2021	18:30	Holstein Kiel	Away	1–1 (a.e.t.) (6–7 p)	Dursun 86'	0	
