= Erich Berko =

German footballer

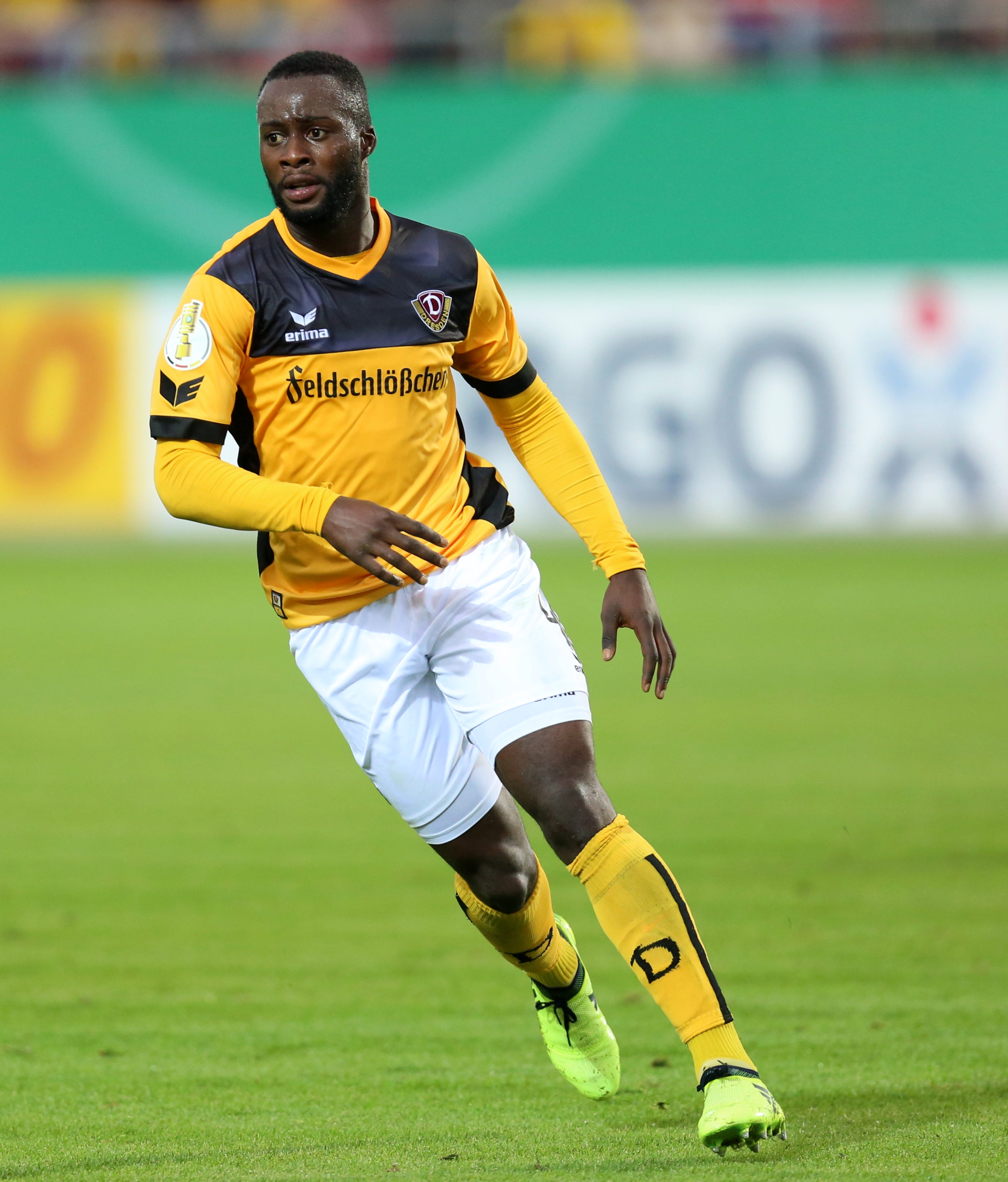
- Berko with Dynamo Dresden in 2017

Personal information
- Date of birth: 6 September 1994 (age 32)
- Place of birth: Ostfildern, Germany
- Height: 1.81 m (5 ft 11 in)
- Positions: Winger; forward

Team information
- Current team: SV Tasmania Berlin
- Number: 29

Youth career
- –2006: Stuttgarter Kickers
- 2006–2012: VfB Stuttgart

Senior career*
Years	Team	Apps	(Gls)
2012–2015	VfB Stuttgart II	43	(4)
2015–2016	Stuttgarter Kickers	36	(11)
2016–2019	Dynamo Dresden	85	(12)
2019–2022	Darmstadt 98	49	(1)
2022	Sandhausen	9	(0)
2022–2023	Maccabi Netanya	6	(0)
2023–2024	Hallescher FC	49	(3)
2024–2025	Bylis Ballsh	24	(6)
2026	VfR Mannheim	8	(2)
2026–	SV Tasmania Berlin	10	(5)

International career
2009	Germany U15	1	(0)
2009	Germany U16	2	(0)
2010–2011	Germany U17	10	(1)
- * Club domestic league appearances and goals as of 23 September 2026

Erich Berko (born 6 September 1994) is a German professional footballer who plays for SV Tasmania Berlin as a forward or as a winger.

== Club career ==
Born in Ostfildern, Berko made his professional debut on 28 January 2012 for VfB Stuttgart II in the 3. Liga against FC Rot-Weiß Erfurt.

On 7 May 2013, Berko extended his contract with VfB Stuttgart until June 2015.

On 31 January 2022, Berko signed with Sandhausen.

On 2 February 2023, Berko joined Hallescher FC in 3. Liga until the end of the 2022–23 season. On 11 June 2023, Berko extended the contract with Hallescher FC.

== International career ==
Berko played for Germany at the 2011 European U-17 Championship.

== Career statistics ==
As of match played on 1 June 2022

Appearances and goals by club, season and competition
Club	Season	League			Cup		Europe		Other		Total	
Club	Season	Division	Apps	Goals	Apps	Goals	Apps	Goals	Apps	Goals	Apps	Goals
VfB Stuttgart II	2011–12	3. Liga	2	0	—		—		—		2	0
VfB Stuttgart II	2012–13	3. Liga	8	0	—		—		—		8	0
VfB Stuttgart II	2013–14	3. Liga	26	2	—		—		—		26	2
VfB Stuttgart II	2014–15	3. Liga	7	2	—		—		—		7	2
VfB Stuttgart II	Total		43	4	0	0	0	0	0	0	43	4
Stuttgarter Kickers	2015–16	3. Liga	36	11	1	0	—		0	0	37	11
Dynamo Dresden	2016–17	2. Bundesliga	29	3	1	0	—		0	0	30	3
Dynamo Dresden	2017–18	2. Bundesliga	29	3	2	1	—		0	0	31	4
Dynamo Dresden	2018–19	2. Bundesliga	27	6	1	0	—		0	0	28	6
Dynamo Dresden	Total		85	12	4	1	0	0	0	0	89	13
Darmstadt 98	2019–20	2. Bundesliga	7	0	0	0	—		0	0	7	0
Darmstadt 98	2020–21	2. Bundesliga	30	1	1	0	—		0	0	31	1
Darmstadt 98	2021–22	2. Bundesliga	12	0	0	0	—		0	0	12	0
Darmstadt 98	Total		49	1	1	0	0	0	0	0	50	1
SV Sandhausen	2021–22	2. Bundesliga	9	0	0	0	—		0	0	9	0
Maccabi Netanya	2022–23	Israeli Premier League	0	0	0	0	0	0	0	0	0	0
Career total			222	28	6	1	0	0	0	0	228	29
