= Patric Pfeiffer =

Ghanaian footballer

Personal information
- Date of birth: 20 August 1999 (age 27)
- Place of birth: Hamburg, Germany
- Height: 1.96 m (6 ft 5 in)
- Position: Defender

Team information
- Current team: Darmstadt 98
- Number: 6

Youth career
- –2013: Bramfelder SV
- 2013–2018: Hamburger SV

Senior career*
Years	Team	Apps	(Gls)
2018–2019	Hamburger SV II	23	(2)
2018–2019	Hamburger SV	0	(0)
2019–2023	Darmstadt 98	80	(6)
2023–2025	FC Augsburg	11	(0)
2024–2025	→ Young Boys (loan)	0	(0)
2024–2025	→ Young Boys II (loan)	2	(0)
2025	→ 1. FC Magdeburg (loan)	8	(0)
2025–	Darmstadt 98	31	(1)

International career^{‡}
2017	Germany U18	2	(0)
2017–2018	Germany U19	2	(0)
2026–	Ghana	1	(0)
- * Club domestic league appearances and goals as of 18 May 2026 ‡ National team caps and goals as of 04:36, 30 October 2023 (UTC)

Patric Pfeiffer (born 20 August 1999) is a professional footballer who plays as a defender for 2. Bundesliga club Darmstadt 98. Born in Germany, he plays for the Ghana national team.

== Early life ==
Pfeiffer was born in Hamburg. He is of Ghanaian descent.

== Club career ==
In the summer of 2019, Pfeiffer joined SV Darmstadt 98 from Hamburger SV.

On 1 June 2023, FC Augsburg signed Pfeiffer from SV Darmstadt 98 for free to a 4-year contract.

On 14 August 2024, Pfeiffer joined Young Boys in Switzerland on a season-long loan. On 3 February 2025, Pfeiffer moved on a new loan to 1. FC Magdeburg in 2. Bundesliga.

On 27 June 2025, Pfeiffer returned to SV Darmstadt 98.

== International career ==
Born in Germany, but also having Ghanaian origins, Pfeiffer is eligible to represent both countries internationally.

In July 2022, the president of the Ghana FA, Kurt Okraku, announced that Pfeiffer was one of the few players that had officially switched allegiances to represent the Ghanaian senior national team internationally.

== Career statistics ==
As of match played 11 December 2024

Appearances and goals by club, season and competition
Club	Season	League			National Cup		Europe		Other		Total	
Club	Season	Division	Apps	Goals	Apps	Goals	Apps	Goals	Apps	Goals	Apps	Goals
Hamburger SV II	2017–18	Regionalliga Nord	1	0	—		—		—		1	0
Hamburger SV II	2018–19	Regionalliga Nord	22	2	—		—		—		22	2
Hamburger SV II	Total		23	2	—		—		—		23	2
Darmstadt 98	2019–20	2. Bundesliga	7	1	0	0	—		—		7	1
Darmstadt 98	2020–21	2. Bundesliga	18	0	2	0	—		—		20	0
Darmstadt 98	2021–22	2. Bundesliga	31	1	1	0	—		—		32	1
Darmstadt 98	2022–23	2. Bundesliga	24	4	2	0	—		—		26	4
Darmstadt 98	Total		80	6	5	0	—		—		85	6
Augsburg	2023–24	Bundesliga	11	0	1	0	—		—		12	0
Young Boys (loan)	2024–25	Swiss Super League	0	0	0	0	1 (Note: Appearances in UEFA Champions League)	0	—		1	0
Career total			114	8	6	0	1	0	0	0	121	8
