= Fabian Baumgärtel =

German footballer

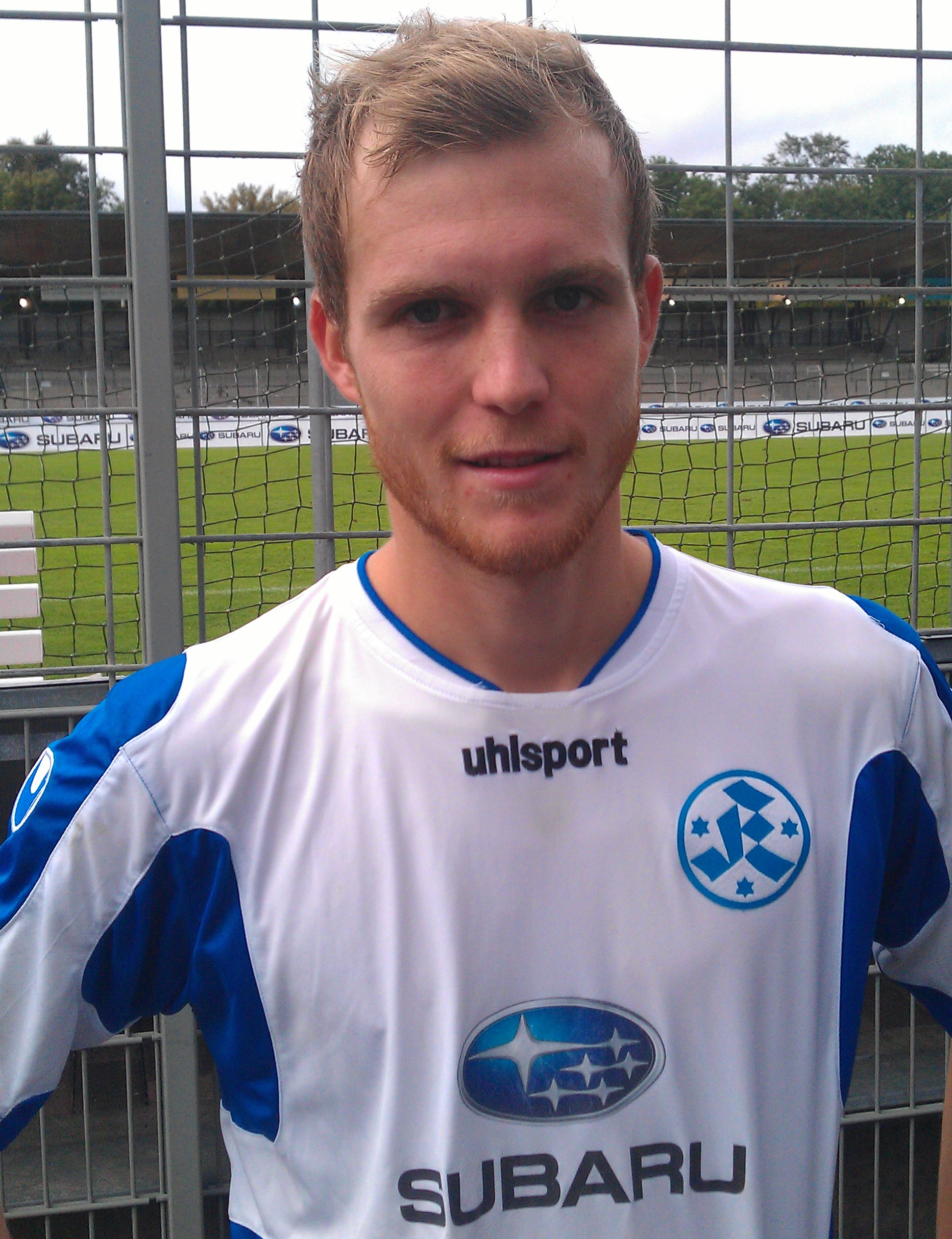

Personal information
- Date of birth: 7 July 1989 (age 37)
- Place of birth: Bamberg, West Germany
- Height: 1.82 m (6 ft 0 in)
- Position: Left back

Team information
- Current team: Greuther Fürth II
- Number: 16

Youth career
- 1. FC Baunach
- SV Hallstadt
- –2004: FC Eintracht Bamberg
- 2004–2008: SpVgg Greuther Fürth

Senior career*
Years	Team	Apps	(Gls)
2008–2013	Greuther Fürth II	95	(7)
2011–2013	Greuther Fürth	1	(0)
2012–2013	→ Alemannia Aachen (loan)	20	(1)
2013–2016	Stuttgarter Kickers	122	(9)
2016–2018	Hallescher FC	74	(7)
2018–2019	Viktoria Köln	15	(0)
2019–2021	SV Elversberg	61	(2)
2022–	Greuther Fürth II	36	(2)
- * Club domestic league appearances and goals as of 21:58, 23 July 2019 (UTC)

Fabian Baumgärtel (born 7 July 1989) is a German footballer who plays as a left back for Greuther Fürth II in the Regionalliga Bayern.
