= Rouven Sattelmaier =

German footballer

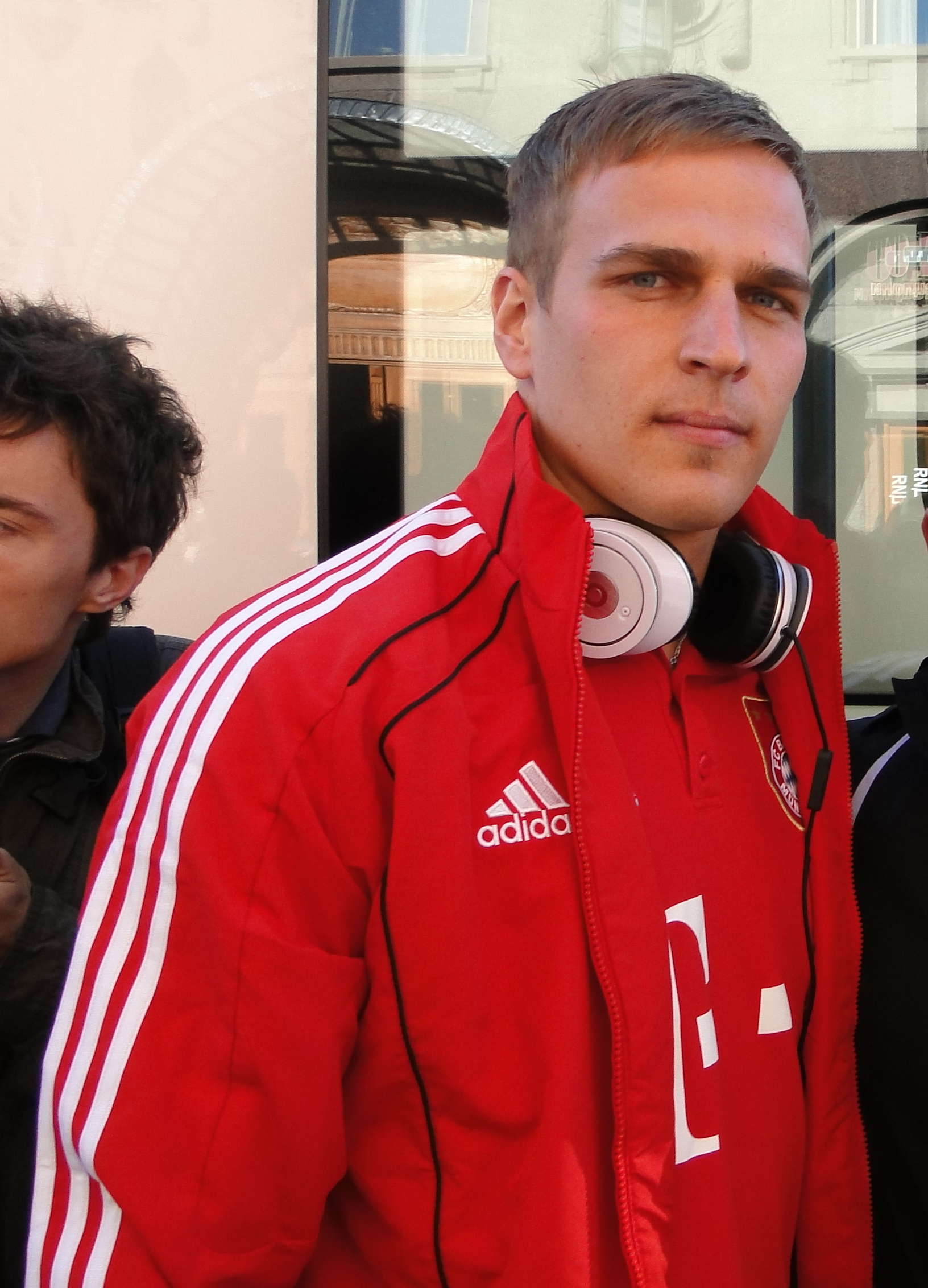
- Sattelmaier with Bayern Munich in 2011

Personal information
- Full name: Rouven Kai Sattelmaier
- Date of birth: 7 August 1987 (age 39)
- Place of birth: Ludwigsburg, West Germany
- Height: 1.87 m (6 ft 2 in)
- Position: Goalkeeper

Youth career
- 1997–2000: TSV Affalterbach
- 2000–2001: VfB Stuttgart
- 2001–2003: SGV Freiberg
- 2003–2005: Stuttgarter Kickers
- 2005–2006: Jahn Regensburg

Senior career*
Years	Team	Apps	(Gls)
2006–2007	Jahn Regensburg II	2	(0)
2007–2010	Jahn Regensburg	65	(0)
2010–2012	Bayern Munich II	26	(0)
2010–2012	Bayern Munich	0	(0)
2013–2015	1. FC Heidenheim	13	(0)
2015–2016	Stuttgarter Kickers	21	(0)
2016–2018	Bradford City	13	(0)
2018–2019	Darmstadt 98	0	(0)
Total		140	(0)

Managerial career
- 2019–2020: Sonnenhof Großaspach (goalkeeping coach)
Medal record
Bayern Munich
Winner	DFL-Supercup	2010
Runner-up	DFB-Pokal	2012
Runner-up	UEFA Champions League	2012
- * Club domestic league appearances and goals

Rouven Kai Sattelmaier (born 7 August 1987) is a German former professional footballer who played as goalkeeper.

== Career ==
Born in Ludwigsburg, Sattelmaier began his career 1997 in the youth team of TSV Affalterbach and was scouted in 2000 by VfB Stuttgart. After only one year for VfB Stuttgart's youth team he was sold to SGV Freiberg. He played two years for Freiberg and joined Stuttgarter Kickers in 2003. In season 2004–05 he won with the Stuttgarter Kickers the South German Championship and moved to Jahn Regensburg where he played his first season in the U-19 team. In winter 2006, Sattelmaier was promoted to the reserve team and earned his first two caps on professional stage in the Oberliga Bayern for Jahn Regensburg. In November 2008 he was called up to the 3. Liga team, due to an injury of goalkeeper Bastian Becker. In 2010, he signed a two-year contract with the German record champions Bayern Munich as keeper for their second team and third choice for the first-team, sharing both roles with Maximilian Riedmüller. He left Bayern after two years.

After his contract expired at Bayern he went on trial at Scottish Football League Third Division side Rangers. After six months without a club, Sattelmaier signed for 1. FC Heidenheim in January 2013.

In July 2016, he signed for English League One side Bradford City on a one-year contract. He was released by Bradford City at the end of the 2017–18 season.

On 13 August 2018, Sattelmaier joined Darmstadt 98 on a one-year deal.

== Coaching career ==
Sattelmaier retired at the end of the 2018–19 season and on 17 July 2019 SG Sonnenhof Großaspach announced, that they had hired him as a goalkeeper coach.

== Career statistics ==
Appearances and goals by club, season and competition
Club	Season	League			Cup		Total	
Club	Season	League	Apps	Goals	Apps	Goals	Apps	Goals
Jahn Regensburg II	2006–07		2	0	—		2	0
Jahn Regensburg	2007–08	Regionalliga Süd	1	0	—		1	0
Jahn Regensburg	2008–09	3. Liga	27	0	—		27	0
Jahn Regensburg	2009–10	3. Liga	37	0	—		37	0
Jahn Regensburg	Total		65	0	—		65	0
Bayern Munich II	2010–11	3. Liga	10	0	—		10	0
Bayern Munich II	2011–12	Regionalliga Süd	16	0	—		16	0
Bayern Munich II	Total		26	0	—		26	0
1. FC Heidenheim	2012–13	3. Liga	2	0	0	0	2	0
1. FC Heidenheim	2013–14	3. Liga	6	0	1	0	7	0
1. FC Heidenheim	2014–15	2. Bundesliga	5	0	2	0	7	0
1. FC Heidenheim	Total		13	0	3	0	16	0
Stuttgarter Kickers	2015–16	3. Liga	21	0	0	0	21	0
Bradford City	2016–17	League One	2	0	0	0	2	0
Bradford City	2017–18	League One	11	0	1	0	12	0
Bradford City	Total		13	0	1	0	14	0
Darmstadt 98	2018–19	2. Bundesliga	0	0	0	0	0	0
Career total			140	0	4	0	144	0

== Honours ==
- Jahn Regensburg player of the season 2008–09
