= Stephané Mvibudulu =

German-Congolese footballer

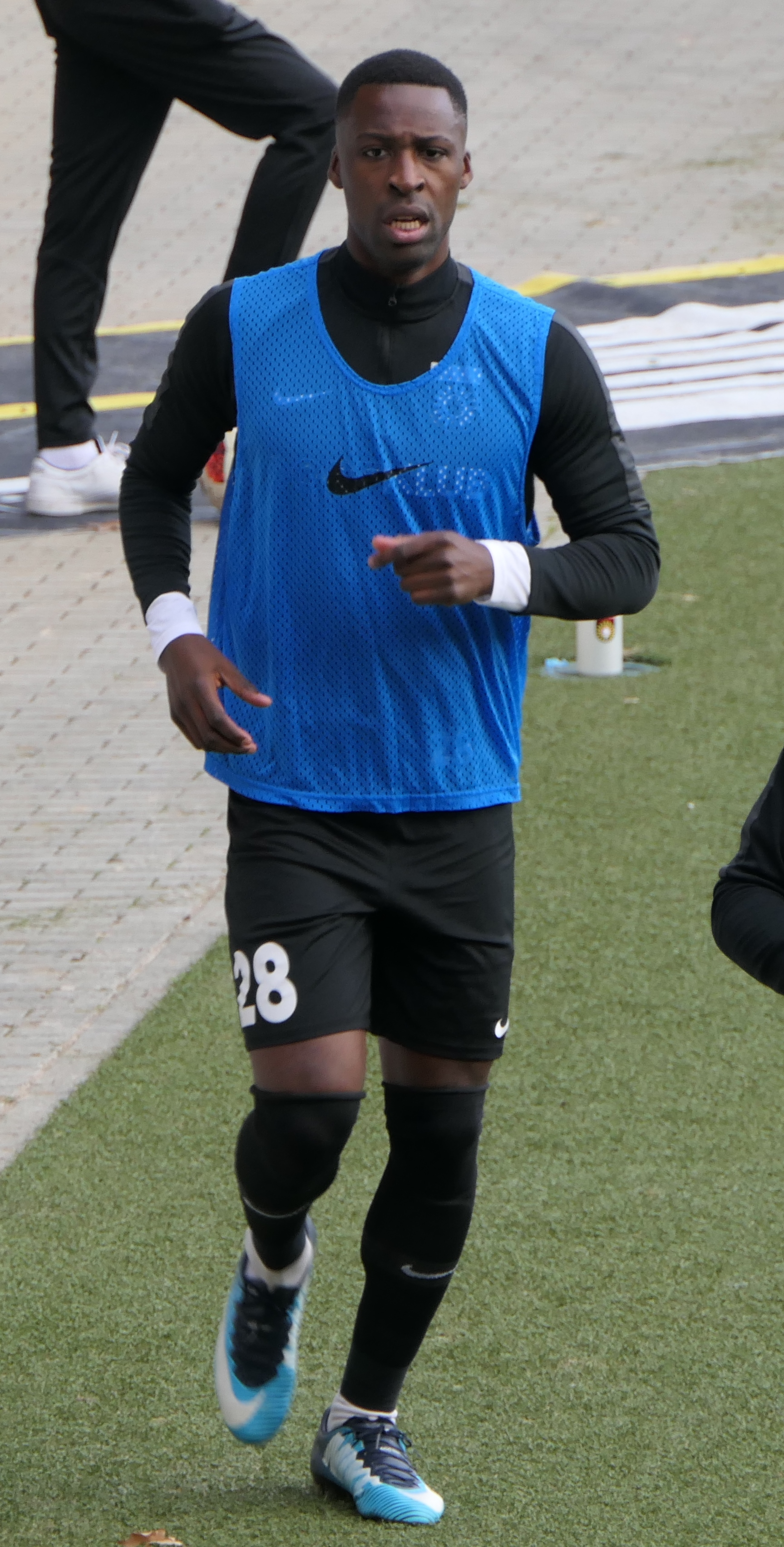

Personal information
- Date of birth: 18 May 1993 (age 33)
- Place of birth: Leipzig, Germany
- Height: 1.88 m (6 ft 2 in)
- Position: Forward

Team information
- Current team: 1. FC Bocholt
- Number: 29

Youth career
- 2006–2011: Lokomotive Leipzig
- 2011–2012: Hallescher FC

Senior career*
| Years | Team | Apps | (Gls) |
| 2012–2013 | Hallescher FC II | 17 | (6) |
| 2013–2016 | 1860 Munich II | 66 | (7) |
| 2015–2016 | 1860 Munich | 9 | (0) |
| 2016 | Stuttgarter Kickers | 16 | (1) |
| 2016–2018 | Wehen Wiesbaden | 21 | (2) |
| 2018–2019 | Sonnenhof Großaspach | 5 | (0) |
| 2019 | → Rot-Weiß Erfurt (loan) | 5 | (0) |
| 2019–2020 | Lokomotive Leipzig | 20 | (1) |
| 2020–2022 | Chemie Leipzig | 25 | (11) |
| 2022– | 1. FC Bocholt | 3 | (1) |
- * Club domestic league appearances and goals as of 12 November 2022

Stephané Mvibudulu (born 18 May 1993) is a German-Congolese professional footballer who plays as a forward for 1. FC Bocholt.

== Club career ==
During his youth Mvibudulu played for Lokomotive Leipzig and Halle. He played his first professional matches for Halle II before transferring to 1860 Munich II in the Regionalliga Bayern at the start of the 2013–14 season. He made his first appearance for 1860 Munich on 8 August 2015 at a 2–0 home win against Hoffenheim in the first round of the DFB-Pokal, when being substituted for Rubin Okotie in the 82nd minute. Subsequently, he gave his 2. Bundesliga debut on 17 August 2015 against Nuremberg. He moved to the Stuttgarter Kickers on 11 January 2016.

== Career statistics ==
As of 22 July 2018

Appearances and goals by club, season and competition
| Club | Season | League | | | DFB-Pokal | | Europe | | Other | | Total | |
| Club | Season | Division | Apps | Goals | Apps | Goals | Apps | Goals | Apps | Goals | Apps | Goals |
|---|---|---|---|---|---|---|---|---|---|---|---|---|
| Halle II | 2012–13 | NOFV-Oberliga Süd | 17 | 6 | — | | — | | — | | 17 | 6 |
| 1860 Munich II | 2013–14 | Regionalliga Bayern | 29 | 3 | — | | — | | — | | 29 | 3 |
| 1860 Munich II | 2014–15 | Regionalliga Bayern | 31 | 3 | — | | — | | — | | 31 | 3 |
| 1860 Munich II | 2015–16 | Regionalliga Bayern | 6 | 1 | — | | — | | — | | 6 | 1 |
| 1860 Munich II | Total | | 66 | 7 | 0 | 0 | 0 | 0 | 0 | 0 | 66 | 7 |
| 1860 Munich | 2015–16 | 2. Bundesliga | 9 | 0 | 2 | 0 | — | | — | | 11 | 0 |
| Stuttgarter Kickers | 2015–16 | 3. Liga | 16 | 1 | 0 | 0 | — | | — | | 16 | 1 |
| Wehen Wiesbaden | 2016–17 | 3. Liga | 13 | 2 | 0 | 0 | — | | — | | 13 | 2 |
| Wehen Wiesbaden | 2017–18 | 3. Liga | 8 | 0 | 1 | 0 | — | | — | | 9 | 0 |
| Wehen Wiesbaden | Total | | 21 | 2 | 1 | 0 | 0 | 0 | 0 | 0 | 22 | 2 |
| Sonnenhof Großaspach | 2018–19 | 3. Liga | 0 | 0 | 0 | 0 | — | | — | | 0 | 0 |
| Career total | | | 129 | 16 | 3 | 0 | 0 | 0 | 0 | 0 | 132 | 16 |
