= Markus Mendler =

German footballer

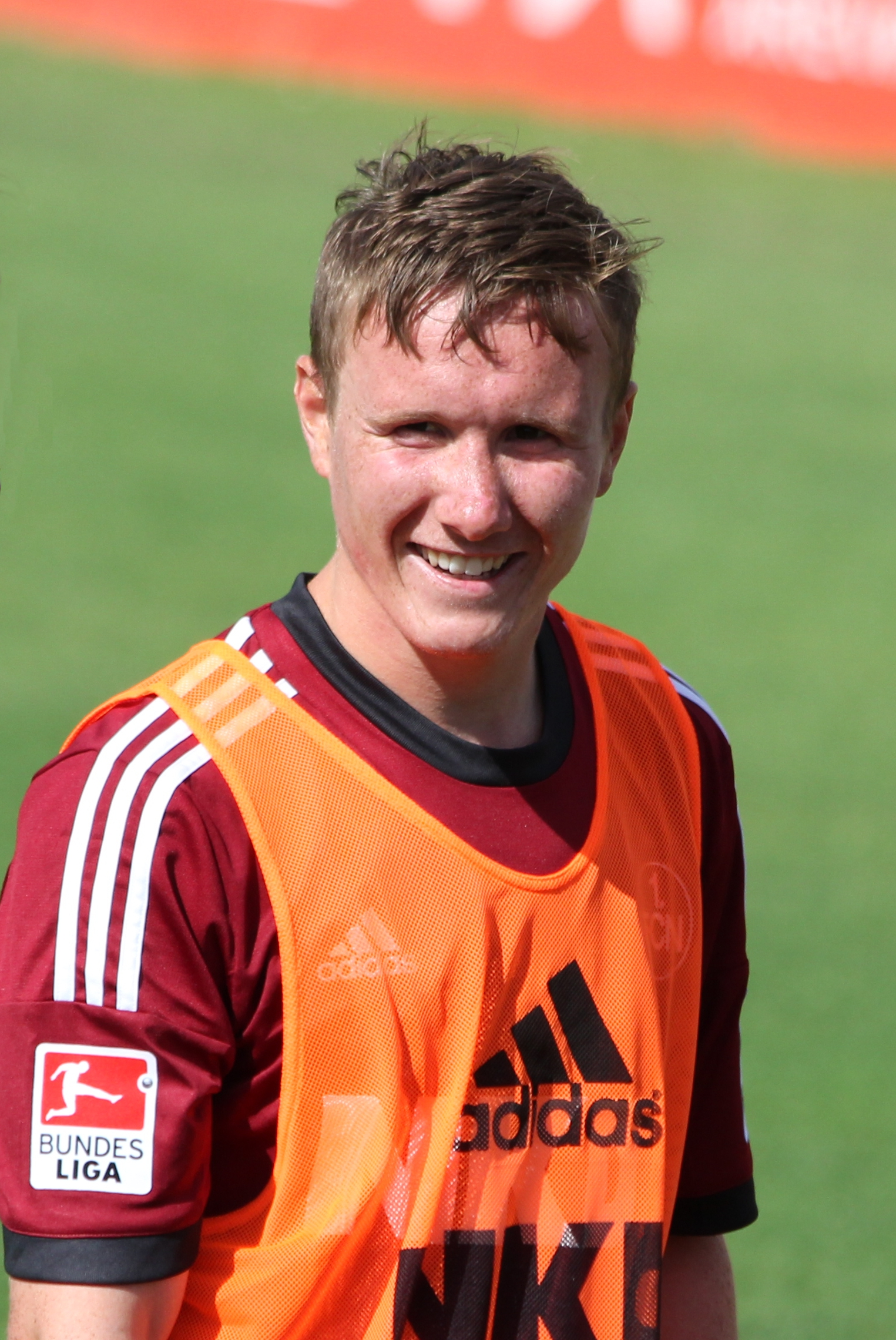
- Mendler with 1. FC Nürnberg in 2013

Personal information
- Date of birth: 7 January 1993 (age 33)
- Place of birth: Memmingen, Germany
- Height: 1.73 m (5 ft 8 in)
- Position: Midfielder

Youth career
- TSV Legau
- 2003–2008: FC Memmingen
- 2008–2012: 1. FC Nürnberg

Senior career*
Years	Team	Apps	(Gls)
2010–2015	1. FC Nürnberg	16	(0)
2011–2015	1. FC Nürnberg II	39	(7)
2014	→ SV Sandhausen (loan)	2	(0)
2015–2016	Stuttgarter Kickers	24	(2)
2016–2021	1. FC Saarbrücken	128	(32)
2021–2026	FC Homburg	154	(56)
Total		463	(105)

International career
2010–2011	Germany U18	7	(5)
2011	Germany U19	9	(3)
2013	Germany U20	2	(0)
- * Club domestic league appearances and goals

Markus Mendler (born 7 January 1993) is a German former professional footballer who played as a midfielder.

== Career ==
Mendler announced his retirement from playing in June 2026 to dedicate more time to his children after the death of his wife in spring.

He represented the Germany under-20 national team on two occasions.

== Honours ==
Individual

- Fritz Walter Medal U18 Bronze: 2011
