= Boné Uaferro =

German footballer

Personal information
- Date of birth: 4 January 1992 (age 34)
- Place of birth: Berlin, Germany
- Height: 1.91 m (6 ft 3 in)
- Position: Centre-back

Youth career
- 1997–2003: VSG Altglienicke
- 2003–2010: Union Berlin

Senior career*
Years	Team	Apps	(Gls)
2010–2012	Union Berlin II	30	(1)
2010–2012	Union Berlin	2	(0)
2012–2014	Schalke 04 II	58	(2)
2014–2019	Fortuna Köln	132	(4)
2019–2025	1. FC Saarbrücken	110	(6)

International career
2009–2010	Germany U18	5	(0)
- * Club domestic league appearances and goals as of 20 May 2025

Boné Uaferro (born 4 January 1992) is a German professional footballer who plays as a centre-back. At international level, he played for the Germany under-18 national team.

== Career ==
Born in Germany to Mozambican parents, he is a former youth international for Germany. Uaferro received his first senior call with Mozambique in July 2014 but did not appear in any matches.

He joined Regionalliga Südwest club 1. FC Saarbrücken on a one-year contract with the option a further year in June 2019.
