= Carl Klaus =

German footballer

Personal information
- Full name: Carl Friedrich Georg Klaus
- Date of birth: 16 January 1994 (age 32)
- Place of birth: Stuttgart, Germany
- Height: 1.89 m (6 ft 2 in)
- Position: Goalkeeper

Team information
- Current team: Union Berlin
- Number: 25

Youth career
- MTV Stuttgart
- –2012: VfB Stuttgart
- 2012–2013: VfL Wolfsburg

Senior career*
Years	Team	Apps	(Gls)
2013–2015	VfL Wolfsburg II	9	(0)
2015–2016	Stuttgarter Kickers	12	(0)
2016–2019	Atlético Baleares	59	(0)
2019–2021	Darmstadt 98	3	(0)
2021–2024	1. FC Nürnberg	23	(0)
2024–	Union Berlin	4	(0)

International career
2011	Germany U18	1	(0)
- * Club domestic league appearances and goals as of 16 May 2026

Carl Klaus (born 16 January 1994) is a German professional footballer who plays as a goalkeeper for Bundesliga club Union Berlin.

== Club career ==
On 28 July 2024, Klaus signed with Union Berlin.

== Career statistics ==
As of match played 16 May 2026

Appearances and goals by club, season and competition
Club	Season	League			Cup		Other		Total	
Club	Season	Division	Apps	Goals	Apps	Goals	Apps	Goals	Apps	Goals
VfL Wolfsburg II	2014–15	Regionalliga	9	0	—		—		9	0
Stuttgarter Kickers	2015–16	3. Liga	12	0	1	0	—		13	0
Atlético Baleares	2016–17	Segunda División B	4	0	—		0	0	4	0
Atlético Baleares	2017–18	Segunda División B	12	0	1	0	—		13	0
Atlético Baleares	2018–19	Segunda División B	37	0	—		6	0	43	0
Atlético Baleares	Total		53	0	1	0	6	0	60	0
Darmstadt 98	2019–20	2. Bundesliga	1	0	0	0	—		1	0
Darmstadt 98	2020–21	2. Bundesliga	2	0	1	0	—		3	0
Darmstadt 98	Total		3	0	1	0	—		4	0
1. FC Nürnberg	2021–22	2. Bundesliga	1	0	2	0	—		3	0
1. FC Nürnberg	2022–23	2. Bundesliga	3	0	1	0	—		4	0
1. FC Nürnberg	2023–24	2. Bundesliga	19	0	1	0	—		20	0
1. FC Nürnberg	Total		23	0	4	0	—		27	0
Union Berlin	2025–26	Bundesliga	4	0	—		—		4	0
Union Berlin	2026–27	Bundesliga	0	0	0	0	—		0	0
Union Berlin	Total		4	0	0	0	—		4	0
Career total			104	0	7	0	6	0	117	0
