= Alessandro Abruscia =

Italian-German footballer (born 1990)

Personal information
- Date of birth: 12 July 1990 (age 36)
- Place of birth: Waiblingen, Germany
- Height: 1.73 m (5 ft 8 in)
- Position: Midfielder

Team information
- Current team: TSV Essingen
- Number: 22

Youth career
- FC Hohenacker
- VfL Waiblingen
- VfB Stuttgart
- TSG Backnang
- 2006–2008: Stuttgarter Kickers

Senior career*
Years	Team	Apps	(Gls)
2008–2012	Stuttgarter Kickers II	33	(3)
2009–2012	Stuttgarter Kickers	87	(7)
2012–2015	TSG Hoffenheim II	50	(2)
2015–2018	Stuttgarter Kickers	86	(18)
2018–2019	1860 Munich	13	(2)
2019–2020	SSV Ulm	7	(0)
2020–2024	VfR Aalen	130	(29)
2024–	TSV Essingen	0	(0)
- * Club domestic league appearances and goals as of 27 July 2024

Alessandro Abruscia (born 12 July 1990) is an Italian-German footballer who plays for TSV Essingen in Oberliga Baden-Württemberg as a midfielder.
