= José-Alex Ikeng =

Footballer (born 1988)

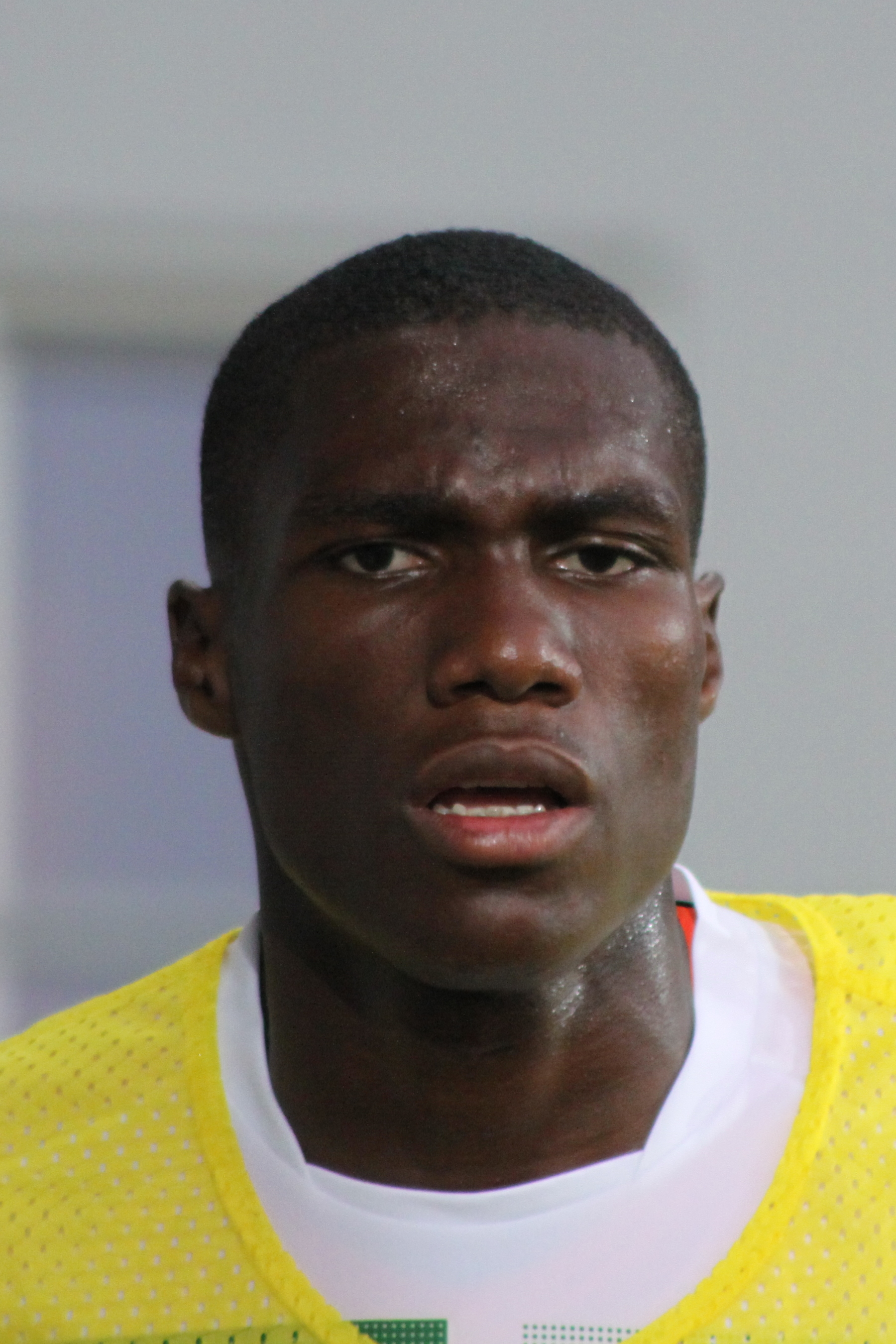
- Ikeng with Werder Bremen II in 2009

Personal information
- Date of birth: 30 January 1988 (age 38)
- Place of birth: Bafia, Cameroon
- Height: 1.88 m (6 ft 2 in)
- Position: Midfielder

Youth career
- 1995–1997: VfR Sersheim
- 1997–1998: Germania Bietigheim
- 1998–2003: SpVgg Ludwigsburg
- 2003–2006: VfB Stuttgart

Senior career*
Years	Team	Apps	(Gls)
2006–2008	VfB Stuttgart II	27	(0)
2008–2011	Werder Bremen II	33	(1)
2011–2013	FC Ingolstadt	23	(3)
2014	Austria Lustenau	6	(0)
2015–2016	Hansa Rostock	25	(2)
2016	Stuttgarter Kickers	0	(0)
Total		114	(6)

International career
	Germany U18	8	(3)
- * Club domestic league appearances and goals

José-Alex Ikeng (born 30 January 1988) is a former professional footballer who played as a midfielder. Born in Cameroon, he represented Germany internationally.

== Club career ==
=== VfB Stuttgart ===
Born in Bafia, Cameroon, Ikeng began his professional career in early 2005, signing with VfB Stuttgart's reserve side. At the time, Ikeng was one of the most highly touted young players in Germany, receiving third place for Fritz-Walter medal in 2006, an award given to the best young German footballer. (Ikeng finished behind Sergej Evljuskin and Alexander Eberlein of VfL Wolfsburg and 1860 Munich, respectively). However, following a series of knee injuries that threatened to end his career, Ikeng lost much of the interest he had begun to earn from senior clubs around Germany via lack of playing time in competitive games.

=== Werder Bremen ===
On 30 December 2008, Ikeng signed a contract with Werder Bremen that kept him at the club until the end of the 2010–11 season. He played for the Under-23 reserve team. In July 2009, in match against VfL Osnabrück, he sustained the third cruciate ligament tear of his career.

=== Later career ===
Ikeng joined Stuttgarter Kickers, placed last in the 3. Liga, from league rivals Hansa Rostock in January 2016. He signed a contract until summer 2017. He left the club at the end of his contract.
