= Marcel Hagmann =

German footballer

Personal information
- Date of birth: 7 January 1983 (age 43)
- Place of birth: Gießen, West Germany
- Height: 1.84 m (6 ft 0 in)
- Position: Defender

Youth career
- TSV Großen-Linden
- TSV Klein-Linden

Senior career*
| Years | Team | Apps | (Gls) |
| –2002 | Eintracht Frankfurt II | | |
| 2002–2003 | 1. FC Saarbrücken II | | |
| 2003–2005 | SV Arminia Hannover | | |
| 2005–2007 | SV Wilhelmshaven | 57 | (7) |
| 2007–2009 | FC Ingolstadt | 27 | (0) |
| 2009–2010 | Jahn Regensburg | 32 | (2) |
| 2010–2015 | FC Ingolstadt II | | |
- * Club domestic league appearances and goals

Marcel Hagmann (born 7 January 1983) is a German former professional footballer who played as a defender.

== Career ==
Hagmann made his debut on the professional league level in the 2. Bundesliga for FC Ingolstadt 04 on 28 October 2008 when he started a game against SV Wehen Wiesbaden.
