= Benjamin Kirchhoff =

German footballer

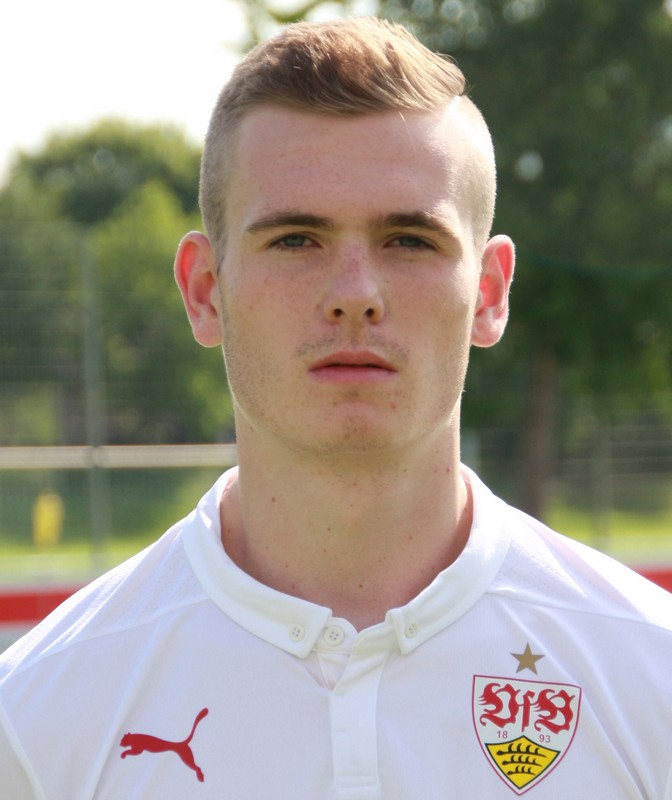

Personal information
- Date of birth: 11 November 1994 (age 32)
- Place of birth: Frankfurt, Germany
- Height: 1.86 m (6 ft 1 in)
- Position: Centre back

Team information
- Current team: Eintracht Frankfurt II
- Number: 28

Youth career
- Eintracht Frankfurt
- FSV Frankfurt

Senior career*
Years	Team	Apps	(Gls)
2013–2016	VfB Stuttgart II	34	(0)
2016–2019	Kickers Offenbach	92	(10)
2019–2025	TSV Steinbach	33	(0)
2025–	Eintracht Frankfurt II	28	(4)
- * Club domestic league appearances and goals as of 26 June 2026

Benjamin Kirchhoff (born 11 November 1994) is a German footballer who plays as a centre back for Eintracht Frankfurt II.

== Career ==
On 21 November 2014, Benjamin Kirchhoff made his debut for VfB Stuttgart II in the 3. Liga against VfL Osnabrück.

== Career statistics ==
As of 23 December 2017.

Club	Season	League			Cup^{1}		Total		Ref.
Club	Season	Division	Apps	Goals	Apps	Goals	Apps	Goals	Ref.
Stuttgart II	2014–15	3. Liga	17	0	—		17	0	
Stuttgart II	2015–16	3. Liga	16	0	—		16	0	
Stuttgart II	Total		33	0	—		33	0!	—
Kickers Offenbach	2016–17	Regionalliga Südwest	29	1	1	0	30	1	
Kickers Offenbach	2017–18	Regionalliga Südwest	32	3	—		32	3	
Kickers Offenbach	Total		61	4	1	0	62	4	—
Career total			94	4	1	0	95	4	—

== Personal life ==
He is the brother of Jan Kirchhoff.
