= Bajram Nebihi =

German footballer (born 1988)

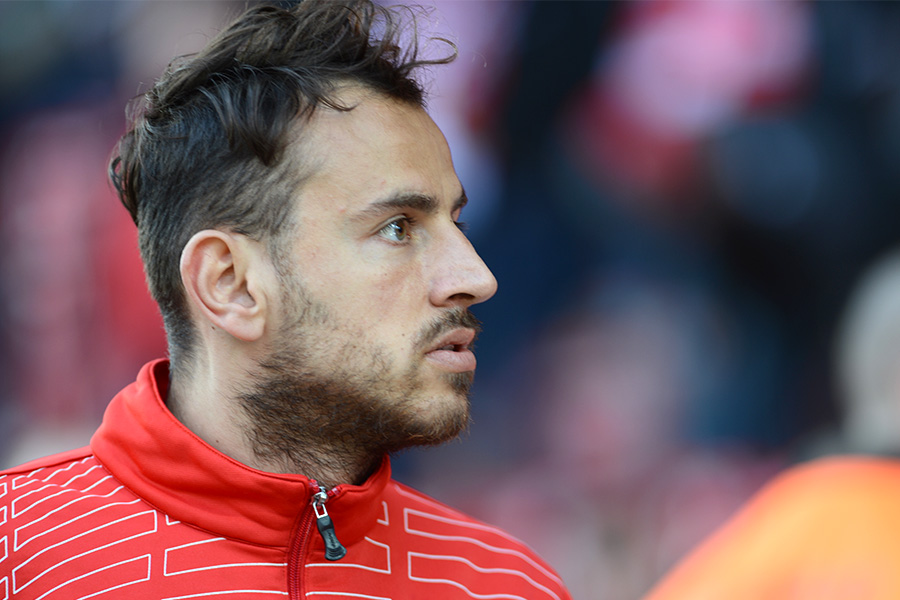
- Nebihi in 2015

Personal information
- Date of birth: 5 August 1988 (age 38)
- Place of birth: Mitrovica, SFR Yugoslavia
- Height: 1.82 m (6 ft 0 in)
- Positions: Forward; attacking midfielder

Youth career
- 1996–2000: TSV Ingolstadt Nord
- 2000–2002: Grün-Weiß Ingolstadt
- 2002–2005: FC Ingolstadt
- 2005–2006: Jahn Regensburg

Senior career*
Years	Team	Apps	(Gls)
2006–2007	TSV Aindling	29	(4)
2007–2008	FC Augsburg II		(4)
2008–2009	Zob Ahan	0	(0)
2009–2010	Wacker Burghausen	16	(0)
2010–2011	Bursaspor	0	(0)
2011–2012	TSV Ampfing	4	(1)
2012	TSV Landsberg	10	(5)
2012–2014	FC Augsburg II	34	(15)
2013–2014	FC Augsburg	0	(0)
2014–2016	Union Berlin	9	(0)
2014–2016	Union Berlin II	3	(0)
2016	Stuttgarter Kickers	13	(2)
2016	Inter Turku	7	(0)
2017	Ubon UMT United	28	(12)
2017–2018	Port	0	(0)
2018	→ Chiangrai United (loan)	15	(3)
2018	→ Chonburi (loan)	7	(1)
2019	Ballkani	8	(1)
2019	Flamurtari	8	(1)
2020	Selangor II	4	(2)
2021–2022	SV Curslack-Neuengamme	8	(1)
2022–2023	ETSV Hamburg	7	(5)
2023–2024	Kosova Hamburg	8	(6)
- * Club domestic league appearances and goals as of 10 August 2024

Bajram Nebihi (born 5 August 1988) is a Kosovan professional footballer who plays as a forward or attacking midfielder.

== Career ==
Nebihi began his career with TSV Ingolstadt Nord and was the scouted by city rival Grün-Weiß Ingolstadt. After two years with Grün-Weiß, he signed for FC Ingolstadt 04 in July 2002. In 2005, at the age of almost 17, he left Ingolstadt, where he had grown up and joined Jahn Regensburg. But there he stayed only a year and left then for TSV Aindling.

Nebihi left after one year where he played 29 games and scored four goals for TSV Aindling to sign for FC Augsburg. After one year with the reserve team of FC Augsburg, he signed in summer 2008 with Zob Ahan in the Iran Pro League. On 21 July 2009, SV Wacker Burghausen signed the 20-year-old midfield player for one year. In 2010, he left Germany again for Süper Lig side Bursaspor. But due to arguments about his salary the contract was annulled.

On 25 August 2016, Nebihi signed with Inter Turku until the end of the 2016 season.

Nebihi joined SV Curslack-Neuengamme of the fifth-tier Oberliga Hamburg in September 2021.
