= Lasse Lehmann =

German footballer

Personal information
- Date of birth: 20 May 1996 (age 30)
- Place of birth: Germany
- Position: Striker

Youth career
- –2009: TSV Schäftlarn
- SpVgg Unterhaching

College career
Years	Team	Apps	(Gls)
2016–2018	Boston College		

Senior career*
Years	Team	Apps	(Gls)
2013–2015	SpVgg Unterhaching II	12	(3)
2015–2016	Stuttgarter Kickers II	20	(0)
2015–2016	Stuttgarter Kickers		
2019	Boston Eagles	18	(1)
2022	TSV 1860 Munich II	10	(0)
- * Club domestic league appearances and goals

Lasse Lehmann (born 20 May 1996) is a German former footballer who played as a striker. His father is former footballer Knut Reinhardt and his stepfather is former footballer Jens Lehmann.
