= Fabian Schnellhardt =

German footballer

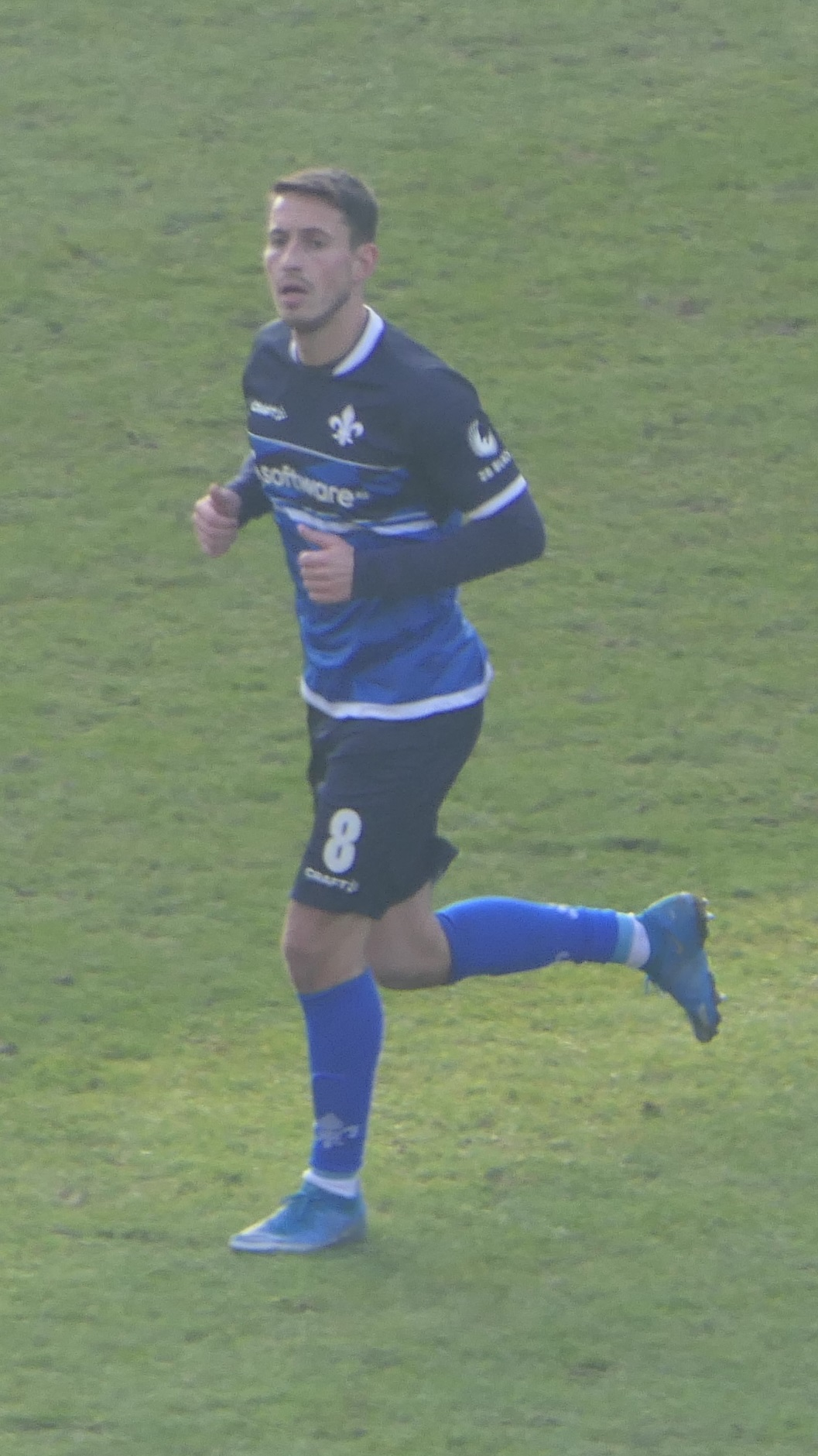
- Schnellhardt in 2023

Personal information
- Date of birth: 12 January 1994 (age 32)
- Place of birth: Leinefelde-Worbis, Germany
- Height: 1.80 m (5 ft 11 in)
- Position: Midfielder

Team information
- Current team: 1. SC 1911 Heiligenstadt

Youth career
- Rot-Weiß Erfurt
- 2009–2012: 1. FC Köln

Senior career*
Years	Team	Apps	(Gls)
2012–2014	1. FC Köln II	39	(3)
2012–2014	1. FC Köln	1	(0)
2014–2019	MSV Duisburg	110	(3)
2015–2016	→ Holstein Kiel (loan)	35	(5)
2019–2024	Darmstadt 98	93	(4)
2024–	1. SC 1911 Heiligenstadt	0	(0)

International career
2009	Germany U15	1	(0)
2009–2010	Germany U16	4	(3)
2010–2011	Germany U17	18	(4)
2012	Germany U18	1	(0)
2012–2013	Germany U19	8	(4)
2013	Germany U20	6	(2)
- * Club domestic league appearances and goals as of 21 May 2024

Fabian Schnellhardt (born 12 January 1994) is a German professional footballer who plays as a midfielder for 1. SC 1911 Heiligenstadt in the sixth-tier Thüringenliga.

== Club career ==
Schnellhardt joined the youth set-up of 1. FC Köln from Rot-Weiß Erfurt, and he advanced through the club's youth system, making his debut for the second team in a 1–1 draw with Wuppertaler SV in Regionalliga West on 5 August 2012. After establishing himself in the second team, Schnellhardt made his 2. Bundesliga debut for Köln as a late substitute in a 4–1 win against Erzgebirge Aue on 1 September 2013.

He joined MSV Duisburg for the 2014–15 season.

He was loaned out to Holstein Kiel for the 2015–16 season. After returning to Duisburg for three more years, he was signed by Darmstadt 98 for the 2019–20 season.

On 12 May 2024, Darmstadt 98 announced that he and several other players would leave the club after the season.

== International career ==
Schnellhardt has represented Germany at every level up to under-20, and he was a member of the German squad at both the 2011 FIFA Under-17 World Cup and the 2011 UEFA European Under-17 Football Championship.

== Career statistics ==
As of match played 18 May 2024

Appearances and goals by club, season and competition
Club	Season	League			Cup		Europe		Other		Total	
Club	Season	Division	Apps	Goals	Apps	Goals	Apps	Goals	Apps	Goals	Apps	Goals
Köln II	2012–13	Regionalliga West	21	2	—		—		—		21	2
Köln II	2013–14	Regionalliga West	18	1	—		—		—		18	1
Köln II	Total		39	3	—		—		—		39	3
Köln	2013–14	2. Bundesliga	1	0	0	0	—		—		1	0
MSV Duisburg	2014–15	3. Liga	14	0	2	0	—		—		16	0
MSV Duisburg	2016–17	3. Liga	33	3	1	0	—		—		34	3
MSV Duisburg	2017–18	2. Bundesliga	30	0	1	0	—		—		31	0
MSV Duisburg	2018–19	2. Bundesliga	33	0	3	1	—		—		36	1
MSV Duisburg	Total		110	3	7	1	—		—		117	4
Holstein Kiel (loan)	2015–16	3. Liga	35	5	1	0	—		—		36	5
Darmstadt 98	2019–20	2. Bundesliga	20	2	2	1	—		—		22	3
Darmstadt 98	2020–21	2. Bundesliga	23	0	3	1	—		—		26	1
Darmstadt 98	2021–22	2. Bundesliga	15	2	1	0	—		—		16	2
Darmstadt 98	2022–23	2. Bundesliga	25	0	2	0	—		—		27	0
Darmstadt 98	2023–24	Bundesliga	10	0	1	0	—		—		11	0
Darmstadt 98	Total		93	4	9	0	—		—		102	4
Career total			278	15	17	3	0	0	0	0	295	18
