= Edisson Jordanov =

Association football player

Personal information
- Full name: Edisson Lachezarov Jordanov
- Date of birth: 8 June 1993 (age 33)
- Place of birth: Rostock, Germany
- Height: 1.72 m (5 ft 8 in)
- Position: Midfielder

Team information
- Current team: Beerschot
- Number: 24

Youth career
- SV Holdenstedt
- –2006: Eintracht Schwerin
- 2006–2011: Hansa Rostock

Senior career*
Years	Team	Apps	(Gls)
2012–2013	Hansa Rostock II	2	(0)
2012–2013	Hansa Rostock	26	(1)
2013–2015	Borussia Dortmund II	67	(8)
2015–2016	Stuttgarter Kickers	26	(1)
2016–2017	Preußen Münster	12	(0)
2017–2019	F91 Dudelange	43	(4)
2019–2020	Virton	24	(2)
2020–2021	Union SG	22	(0)
2021–2025	Westerlo	69	(3)
2025–	Beerschot	23	(1)

International career^{‡}
2008	Germany U15	1	(0)
2008	Germany U16	2	(0)
2012	Germany U19	2	(0)
2013–2014	Bulgaria U21	6	(2)
2021–	Bulgaria	5	(0)
- * Club domestic league appearances and goals as of 19 April 2026 ‡ National team caps and goals as of 22:48, 9 June 2022 (UTC)

Edisson Lachezarov Jordanov (Bulgarian: Едисон Лъчезаров Йорданов; born 8 June 1993) is a professional footballer who plays as a midfielder for Belgian Challenger Pro League club Beerschot. Born in Germany, he plays for the Bulgaria national team.

== Early life ==
Jordanov was born in Rostock to a Bulgarian father who emigrated to Germany in 1988, Lachezar Jordanov, and a German mother, Karina.

== Club career ==
=== Youth ===
He started playing football at SV Holdenstedt, a local club from Uelzen, Lower Saxony. Later he moved to Eintracht Schwerin and in 2006 he relocated to the city of his birth to join the youth ranks of Hansa Rostock.

=== Hansa Rostock ===
In the first half of the 2011–12 season, Jordanov scored seven goals in 13 appearances for the under-19s. He made his Hansa first team debut in a 2–1 away loss against VfL Bochum on 5 February 2012.

=== Borussia Dortmund ===
On 31 May 2013, Jordanov signed with Borussia Dortmund II for two years. In January 2014, Jordanov was called up to the first team for training camp in San Pedro del Pinatar, Spain. On 12 January, he made his debut in a friendly against Standard Liège, coming on as a 70th-minute substitute for Kevin Großkreutz. Two days later he scored a goal in friendly match against VfL Bochum. In the following second half of the 2013–14 Bundesliga though, he did not manage to become a part of the first team and was never called up for the squad in an official match.

=== Virton ===
Ahead of the 2019–20 season, Jordanov joined Belgian club Virton.

=== Westerlo ===
On 7 July 2021, Jordanov signed a two-year contract with Westerlo.

== International career ==
Jordanov has been capped for Germany U15, Germany U16 and Germany U19.

In 2012, he declined an invitation to play for Bulgaria U-21, but in the next year he became part of the team. He made his debut for Bulgaria U21 in September 2013.

Jordanov received his first call-up for the senior Bulgaria team in October 2021 for the matches against Ukraine and Switzerland on 11 and 15 November. He earned his first cap against the former, appearing as a starter, but was substituted by Ivan Turitsov early during the first half due to sustaining an injury.

== Career statistics ==
=== Club ===
As of 25 April 2015

Appearances and goals by club, season and competition
Club	Season	League			Cup		Continental		Other		Total	
Club	Season	Division	Apps	Goals	Apps	Goals	Apps	Goals	Apps	Goals	Apps	Goals
Hansa Rostock	2011–12	2. Bundesliga	12	0	0	0	—		—		12	0
Hansa Rostock	2012–13	3. Liga	14	1	1	0	—		—		15	1
Hansa Rostock	Total		26	1	1	0	0	0	0	0	27	1
Borussia Dortmund II	2013–14	3. Liga	35	4	0	0	—		—		35	4
Borussia Dortmund II	2014–15	3. Liga	31	4	0	0	—		—		31	4
Borussia Dortmund II	Total		66	8	0	0	0	0	0	0	66	8
Career total			92	9	1	0	0	0	0	0	93	9

== Honours ==
Westerlo

- Belgian First Division B: 2021–22
