= Daniel Lang (footballer) =

German footballer

Personal information
- Date of birth: 17 May 1992 (age 34)
- Place of birth: Backnang, Germany
- Height: 1.86 m (6 ft 1 in)
- Position: Striker

Team information
- Current team: FV Illertissen
- Number: 16

Youth career
- SC Freiburg
- 2009–2010: TSG Backnang

Senior career*
Years	Team	Apps	(Gls)
2010–2011	SG Sonnenhof Großaspach II		
2010–2014	SG Sonnenhof Großaspach	25	(5)
2014–2016	Stuttgarter Kickers II	59	(27)
2015–2016	→ Stuttgarter Kickers	2	(0)
2016–	FV Illertissen	1	(0)
- * Club domestic league appearances and goals as of 19 July 2015 (UTC)

Daniel Lang (born 17 May 1992) is a German footballer who plays for FV Illertissen.
