= Stuttgart derby =

Football matches between Stuttgarter Kickers and VfB Stuttgart

- Stuttgarter Kickers VfB Stuttgart
- Other names: Stuttgarter Stadtderby; Stuttgarter Lokalderby
- Location: Stuttgart, Germany
- First meeting: 15 September 1912
- Latest meeting: 3 February 2017

Statistics
- Most wins: VfB (87)
- Largest victory: Kickers 11–0 VfB (26 November 1916)

The Stuttgart derby (German: Stuttgarter Stadtderby) is the name given to football matches between Stuttgarter Kickers and VfB Stuttgart, both of them from Stuttgart, Germany.

== All-time results ==
Season	Date	No.	Competition	Home team	Score	Away team	Home goal scorers	Away goal scorers	Att.
1912-13	15-09-1912	1	Südkreis-Liga	Kickers	6–2	VfB			
1912-13	10-11-1912	2	Südkreis-Liga	VfB	3–2	Kickers			
1913-14	28-09-1913	3	Südkreis-Liga	VfB	0–3	Kickers			
1913-14	08-02-1914	4	Südkreis-Liga	Kickers	1–1	VfB			
1916-17	15-10-1916	5	Bezirksliga Schwaben	VfB	1–7	Kickers			
1916-17	26-11-1916	6	Bezirksliga Schwaben	Kickers	11–0	VfB			
1917–18	14-10-1917	7	Süddeutscher Pokal	VfB	2–4	Kickers			
1918–19	22-09-1918	8	Herbstrunde	Kickers	1–0	VfB			
1918–19	24-04-1919	9	Frühjahrsrunde	Kickers	1–3	VfB			
1918–19	??-??-1919	10	Frühjahrsrunde	Kickers	3–1	VfB			
1919–20	28-09-1919	11	Kreisliga Württemberg	Kickers	3–1	VfB			
1919–20	21-12-1919	12	Test	VfB	0–5	Kickers			
1919–20	07-03-1920	13	Kreisliga Württemberg	VfB	1–2	Kickers			
1919–20	28-03-1920	14	Test	Kickers	5–1	VfB			
1920–21	14-11-1920	15	Kreisliga Württemberg	VfB	0–2	Kickers			
1920–21	16-01-1921	16	Kreisliga Württemberg	Kickers	3–0	VfB			
1921-22	24-09-1921	17	Kreisliga Württemberg	Kickers	1–1	VfB			
1921-22	08-01-1922	18	Kreisliga Württemberg	VfB	1–0	Kickers			
1922–23	15-10-1922	19	Kreisliga Württemberg	Kickers	2–1	VfB			
1922–23	10-12-1922	20	Kreisliga Württemberg	VfB	0–0	Kickers			
1922–23	22-04-1923	21	Süddeutscher Pokal	VfB	3–2 (aet)	Kickers			
1923-24	??-??-1923	22	Test	VfB	0–1	Kickers		Hartmann 20'	
1924–25	21-09-1924	23	Bezirksliga Württemberg-Baden	VfB	1–0	Kickers	unknown 17'		8.000
1924–25	04-01-1925	24	Bezirksliga Württemberg-Baden	Kickers	4–0	VfB			
1925-26	27-09-1925	25	Bezirksliga Württemberg-Baden	Kickers	3–3	VfB			
1925-26	29-11-1925	26	Bezirksliga Württemberg-Baden	VfB	6–0	Kickers			
1925-26	31-01-1926	27	Test	Kickers	4–4	VfB			
1925-26	28-02-1926	28	Test	VfB	1–2	Kickers			
1926-27	19-09-1926	29	Bezirksliga Württemberg-Baden	VfB	4–1	Kickers			
1926-27	05-12-1926	30	Bezirksliga Württemberg-Baden	Kickers	1–4	VfB			
1927-28	16-10-1927	31	Bezirksliga Württemberg-Baden	Kickers	3–1	VfB			
1927-28	13-11-1927	32	Bezirksliga Württemberg-Baden	VfB	3–3	Kickers	Becker, Rebmann (2)	Grünfeld ??', 80', Maneval	6.000
1927-28	06-05-1928	33	Test	Kickers	1–3	VfB			5.000
1928-29	14-10-1928	34	Bezirksliga Württemberg-Baden	VfB	0–0	Kickers	—	—	
1928-29	25-11-1928	35	Bezirksliga Württemberg-Baden	Kickers	2–2	VfB			
1928-29	06-01-1929	36	Süddeutsche Meisterschaft	Kickers	0–4	VfB	—	Becker, Rutz, Rebmann, Vallendor	5.000
1928-29	10-03-1929	37	Süddeutsche Meisterschaft	VfB	1–3	Kickers	Vollmer	Link 25', ??', ??'	5-6.000
1928-29	30-06-1929	38	Test	Kickers	1–0	VfB	Hoffmann 65'	—	
1929–30	06-10-1929	39	Bezirksliga Württemberg-Baden	Kickers	3–2	VfB	Gimpel 25', Buhl ??', 56'	Koch 55', unknown 85' (o.g.)	12.000
1929–30	17-11-1929	40	Bezirksliga Württemberg-Baden	VfB	0–2	Kickers	—	Handte 44', Keßler, 87'	6.000
1930-31	12-10-1930	41	Bezirksliga Württemberg-Baden	VfB	0–0	Kickers	—	—	6.000
1930-31	09-11-1930	42	Bezirksliga Württemberg-Baden	Kickers	0–2	VfB			
1930-31	28-12-1930	43	Play-off Bezirksliga Württemberg-Baden	VfB	1–6	Kickers			
1930-31	31-05-1931	44	Test	VfB	1–3	Kickers			
1931-32	04-10-1931	45	Bezirksliga Württemberg-Baden	Kickers	1–2	VfB	Handte	Becker, Pröfrock	
1931-32	15-11-1931	46	Bezirksliga Württemberg-Baden	VfB	2–1	Kickers			8.000
1932-33	04-09-1932	47	Bezirksliga Württemberg-Baden	Kickers	5–1	VfB	Esenwein ??' ??', Merz 48', Link 75', ??'	Seibold	10.000
1932-33	20-11-1932	48	Bezirksliga Württemberg-Baden	VfB	1–1	Kickers		Cozza	16.000
1932-33	30-04-1933	49	Test	VfB	2–2	Kickers			
1932-33	??-0?-1933	50	Test	Kickers	7–0	VfB			
1933-34	19-11-1933	51	Gauliga Württemberg	Kickers	1–4	VfB	Baier II	Rutz, Becker, unknown, unknown (o.g.)	8.000
1933-34	??-0?-1934	52	Test	Kickers	3–1	VfB			
1933-34	21-01-1934	53	Gauliga Württemberg	VfB	4–0	Kickers	Ulrich (o.g.), Becker, Haaga 75', Böckle	—	15.000
1933-34	??-0?-1934	54	Test	VfB	2–2	Kickers			
1934-35	04-11-1934	55	Gauliga Württemberg	VfB	2–0	Kickers	Lehmann, Rutz	—	18.000
1934-35	10-03-1935	56	Gauliga Württemberg	Kickers	1–6	VfB		Lehmann, Rutz, Koch	12.000
1935-36	17-11-1935	57	Gauliga Württemberg	VfB	2–2	Kickers	Euchenhofer (2)	Buch, Haaga	12.000
1935-36	16-02-1936	58	Gauliga Württemberg	Kickers	4–1	VfB	Baier (2), Euchenhofer, Stickroth	Böckle	
1936-37	29-11-1936	59	Gauliga Württemberg	Kickers	0–2	VfB	—	Rutz, Lehmann 89'	20.000
1936-37	28-02-1937	60	Gauliga Württemberg	VfB	3–1	Kickers	Pröfrock, Haaga, Schäfer	Wohlbold	8.000
1937–38	19-08-1937	61	Test	VfB	4–4	Kickers			7.000
1937–38	28-11-1937	62	Gauliga Württemberg	VfB	0–0	Kickers	—	—	25.000
1937–38	13-03-1938	63	Gauliga Württemberg	Kickers	0–2	VfB	—	Lehmann 44', Koch 89'	45.000
1938–39	18-08-1938	64	Test	Kickers	2–2	VfB	Frey (2)	Pröfrock, Bökle	
1938–39	13-11-1938	65	Gauliga Württemberg	Kickers	3–1	VfB	Kipp 2', 53', Merz 12'	Koch 71'	18.000
1938–39	19-03-1939	66	Gauliga Württemberg	VfB	4–4	Kickers	Kneer 13', Bökle 37', Schäfer 51', Steinbrunner 75'	Frey 57', 70', 71', Miller 78'	15.000
1939–40	08-10-1939	67	Stuttgarter Stadtmeisterschaft	Kickers	3–3	VfB			
1939–40	26-11-1939	68	Stuttgarter Stadtmeisterschaft	VfB	3–0	Kickers			
1939–40	17-03-1940	69	Endrunde Gauliga Württemberg	VfB	5–4	Kickers	Steinbrunner, Koch, Seitz, Lehmann (2)	Merz 4', Kipp, Koch (o.g.), Conen	13.500
1939–40	28-04-1940	70	Endrunde Gauliga Württemberg	Kickers	3–1	VfB	Ruf		
1940–41	01-09-1940	71	Stuttgarter Stadtpokal	Kickers	5–2	VfB			5.000
1940–41	01-12-1940	72	Gauliga Württemberg	VfB	1–1	Kickers			
1940–41	16-03-1941	73	Gauliga Württemberg	Kickers	1–0	VfB	Sing 87'	—	15.000
1941–42	23-11-1941	74	Gauliga Württemberg	Kickers	1–3	VfB	Sing 73'	Richt 30', Lehmann 65', 88'	7.000
1941–42	08-03-1942	75	Gauliga Württemberg	VfB	1–2	Kickers	Schäfer 38'	Conen 7', 75'	7-8.000
1942–43	08-11-1942	76	Gauliga Württemberg	VfB	3–4	Kickers	Haaga (2), Kneer	Frey (2), Merz, Richt (o.g.)	3.500
1942–43	0?-03-1943	77	Gauliga Württemberg	Kickers	2–6	VfB	Frey 40', ??'	Koch, Otterbach 38', Schäfer 65', 80', Böckle 67'	7.000
1942–43	16-03-1941	78	Gaupokal Württemberg	Kickers	4–3 (aet)	VfB	Groß (o.g.), Frey ??', 86', Masche 95'	Koch, Otterbach, Maile 60'	3.500
1943–44	21-11-1943	79	Gauliga Württemberg	VfB	0–1	Kickers			
1943–44	12-03-1944	80	Gauliga Württemberg	Kickers	2–3	VfB			
1943–44	09-07-1944	81	Gaupokal Württemberg	VfB	1–2 (aet)	Kickers		Ziegler	30.000
1945–46	12-08-1945	82	Test	VfB	1–0	Kickers			
1945–46	07-10-1945	83	Spiel um Ehrenpreis Stuttgarts	VfB	1–0	Kickers			
1945–46	23-12-1945	84	Oberliga Süd	Kickers	3–2	VfB	Rath (2), Förschler		
1945–46	28-04-1946	85	Oberliga Süd	VfB	1–0	Kickers			45.000
1946–47	31-08-1946	86	Württemberg Cup	VfB	1–3	Kickers	Langjahr 30'	Frey 4', Vetter, S. Kronenbitter 85'	20.000
1946–47	29-12-1946	87	Oberliga Süd	Kickers	1–3	VfB	Frey 88'	Binkert 16', 73', Lehmann 56'	22.000
1946–47	01-06-1947	88	Oberliga Süd	VfB	1–0	Kickers	Binkert 6'	—	22.000
1947–48	07-12-1947	89	Oberliga Süd	Kickers	3–4	VfB	Conen 11', Schmeißer 78', Sosna 85'	Binkert 21', Lehmann 44', 54', Kraft 57'	35.000
1947–48	16-05-1948	90	Oberliga Süd	VfB	1–0	Kickers	Läpple 81'	—	48.000
1948–49	31-10-1948	91	Oberliga Süd	Kickers	2–1	VfB	Witt 4', Baumann 65'	Herberger 22'	35.000
1948–49	06-03-1949	92	Oberliga Süd	VfB	2–3	Kickers	Langjahr 81', Läpple 84'	Conen 13', Dreher 35', Schaletzki 53'	22.000
1949–50	06-11-1949	93	Oberliga Süd	VfB	1–1	Kickers	Schlienz 78'	S. Kronenbitter 19'	20.000
1949–50	12-03-1950	94	Oberliga Süd	Kickers	0–3	VfB	—	Blessing 15', 62', Krieger 78'	18.000
1950–51	06-05-1951	95	Test	VfB	2–1	Kickers			
1950–51	06-06-1951	96	Test	VfB	2–1	Kickers			
1951–52	30-09-1951	97	Oberliga Süd	VfB	6–1	Kickers	Läpple 16', Wehrle 32', 64', Baitinger 51', Blessing 60, 67'	S. Kronenbitter 52'	42.000
1951–52	03-02-1952	98	Oberliga Süd	Kickers	1–1	VfB	Jackstell 45'	Blessing 18'	30.000
1952–53	21-09-1952	99	Oberliga Süd	VfB	2–0	Kickers	Krieger 79', Blessing 85'	—	35.000
1952–53	01-02-1953	100	Oberliga Süd	Kickers	1–1	VfB	Liebschwager 80' (o.g.)	Wehrle 65'	14.000
1953–54	20-09-1953	101	Oberliga Süd	VfB	2–1	Kickers	Waldner 1', Krieger 29'	Dreher 62'	15.000
1953–54	24-01-1954	102	Oberliga Süd	Kickers	4–0	VfB	Ritter 46', 2:0 Pflum 65', Wünsch 70', Schad 87'	—	33.000
1954–55	17-10-1954	103	Oberliga Süd	VfB	2–1	Kickers	Hinterstocker 18', 71'	Pflum 35'	32.000
1954–55	13-02-1955	104	Oberliga Süd	Kickers	1–0	VfB	Schumacher 67'	—	20.000
1954–55	11-06-1955	105	Test	VfB	4–3	Kickers			
1955–56	09-10-1955	106	Oberliga Süd	VfB	3–1	Kickers	Krauß 47', 71', Bühler 73'	Schumacher 59'	32.000
1955–56	19-02-1956	107	Oberliga Süd	Kickers	0–0	VfB	—	—	13.000
1956-57	30-09-1956	108	Oberliga Süd	VfB	3–1	Kickers	Dornhecker 54', Blessing 56', Strohmaier 77'	Geiger 60'	25.000
1956-57	17-02-1957	109	Oberliga Süd	Kickers	1–5	VfB	S. Kronenbitter 80'	Hinterstocker 1', 34', Blessing 50', Praxl 54', Strohmaier 65'	30.000
1957-58	15-09-1957	110	Oberliga Süd	VfB	1–0	Kickers	Praxl 46'	—	30.000
1957-58	19-01-1958	111	Oberliga Süd	Kickers	0–3	VfB	—	Simon 59', Strohmaier 68', Tagliaferri 84'	20.000
1958–59	09-08-1958	112	Test	VfB	6–1	Kickers			11.000
1958–59	06-06-1959	113	Test	VfB	3–2	Kickers			
1959-60	27-09-1959	114	Oberliga Süd	Kickers	1–3	VfB	Geiger 7', Hartl 56', Blessing 74'	Wahler 29'	23.000
1959-60	07-02-1960	115	Oberliga Süd	VfB	1–1	Kickers	Blessing 16'	Wahler 78'	19.000
1960-61	06-08-1960	116	Test	VfB	3–2	Kickers	Weise 2', Blessing 16', 54'	Tagliaferri 22', Buğeker 83'	8.000
1960-61	11-02-1961	117	Süddeutscher Pokal	Kickers	1–3	VfB	Rolf Steeb 21'	Retter 13', Höller 20', Rauser 64'	12.000
1962-63	04-08-1962	118	Test	VfB	4–3	Kickers	Wanner 50', Strohmaier 68', Entenmann 75', Reiner 77'	Tagliaferri 40', Hinterstocker 61', Wendel 87'	10.000
1964-65	01-08-1964	119	Test	Kickers	0–3	VfB		Geiger 50', Siebert 70', Huttary	
1965-66	31-07-1965	120	Test	Kickers	0–3	VfB			
1965-66	19-02-1966	121	Test	VfB	2–1	Kickers	Entenmann 8', 2:0 Waldner 14'	Fröhlich 88'	15.000
1966-67	31-07-1966	122	Test	VfB	1–0	Kickers	Peters 24'		
1967-68	29-07-1967	123	Test	Kickers	3–4	VfB		Köppel 19', 23', Weiß 71', Gress 88'	
1968-69	27-07-1968	124	Test	Kickers	2–2	VfB			
1969-70	25-07-1969	125	Test	VfB	5–1	Kickers	Entenmann 1', Weidle 18', Gress 28', Hoffmann 57', 71'	Schieck 73'	16.000
1970-71	24-07-1970	126	Test	VfB	1–1	Kickers	Haaga 76'	Potschak 58'	10.000
1970-71	20-02-1971	127	Test	VfB	0–4	Kickers	—	Böhringer 32', Schmeil 37', Bründl 57', 73'	2.000
1971-72	27-07-1971	128	Test	VfB	6–1	Kickers	Haug 15', Weidmann 31', Ettmayer 52', Berger 61', 68', 79'	Fürther 29'	12.000
1972-73	27-09-1972	129	Test	VfB	6–1	Kickers	Berger 16', 89', Handschuh 24', Coordes 35', Lindner 50', 67'	Frommer 64'	2.800
1973-74	20-07-1973	130	Test	VfB	7–0	Kickers	Stickel (3), Brenninger (2), Handschuh, Müller	—	11.000
1973-74	29-12-1973	131	Test	Kickers	1–2	VfB	Entenmann 4', Müller 9'	Scheuring 30'	8.800
1974-75	19-07-1974	132	Test	VfB	2–0	Kickers	Ohlicher 54', Stickel 73'	—	7.000
1974-75	22-12-1974	133	Test	Kickers	2–6	VfB			
1975-76	25-07-1975	134	Test	VfB	1–2	Kickers	Ohlicher 21'	Schroff 28', Toth 74'	13.000
1975-76	04-10-1975	135	2. Bundesliga South	Kickers	2–0	VfB	Holoch 45', Schroff 86'	—	29.000
1975-76	03-04-1976	136	2. Bundesliga South	VfB	5–0	Kickers	Hoeneß 13', Weidmann 14', H. Müller 43', Dietterle 76', Ohlicher 85'	—	16.000
1976-77	14-08-1976	137	2. Bundesliga South	Kickers	0–0	VfB	—	—	27.500
1976-77	26-12-1976	138	2. Bundesliga South	VfB	2–1	Kickers	Ohlicher 3', Elmer 70'	Hoffmann 54'	37.000
1977-78	18-07-1977	139	Test	VfB	7–4	Kickers	Ohlicher 2x, Hattenberger 2x, Martin, Beck, Hitzfeld	Saile 2x, Allgöwer, Kehl	17.000
1977-78	??-04-1978	140	Test	VfB	1–1	Kickers	Jank 59'	Dollmann 39'	4.200
1978-79	21-07-1978	141	Test	VfB	7–1	Kickers	Volkert 2', 12', 83', Hoeneß 35', Beck 55', 63', Ohlicher 79'	Dreher 23'	12.500
1979-80	25-07-1979	142	Test	VfB	1–2	Kickers	Kelsch 19'	Saile 42', Allgöwer 88'	
1980-81	25-07-1979	143	Test	VfB	3–0	Kickers	—	H. Müller 34', 79, Steinkirchner 90' (o.g.)	15.000
1981-82	22-07-1981	144	Test	VfB	8–1	Kickers	Beck 18', 34', 44', Martin 24', D. Müller 36', 65', H. Müller 62', Tüfekçi 88'	Steinkirchner 12'	
1981-82		145	Test	VfB	2–0	Kickers	Tüfekçi 16', Hadewicz 42'	—	2.900
1982-83	10-08-1982	146	Test	VfB	3–2	Kickers	Sigurvinsson, Six, Reichert 88'	Susser, Merkle	17 800
1982-83	20-02-1983	147	Test	VfB	4–1	Kickers	Ohlicher 34', Kempe 63', Allgöwer 77', Niedermayer 82'	Dreher 7'	3 140
1983-84	19-07-1983	148	Test	VfB	3–2	Kickers	Corneliusson 34', Buchwald 40', Reichert 68'	Klinsmann, J. Müller	9.700
1983-84	19-11-1983	149	Test	Kickers	1–6	VfB	Klinsmann		3.500
1983-84	04-03-1984	150	Test	VfB	3–2	Kickers	Buchwald 10', Zietsch 57', 59'	Forster 22', Finke 30'	2.700
1984-85	27-07-1984	151	Test	VfB	6–0	Kickers	Allgöwer 4', Reichert 35', 62', Niedermayer 67', Klinsmann 83', Claesen 90'	—	8 300
1984-85	27-01-1985	152	Test	VfB	3–1	Kickers	Reichert 3', Claesen 83', Wolff 90'	Dannenberg 80'	800
1985-86	30-07-1985	153	Test	VfB	2–2	Kickers	Müller 18', Reichert 68'	Streich 19', 90'	10.200
1986-87	22-07-1986	154	Test	VfB	2–2	Kickers	Müller 58', Allgöwer 78'	Hein 64', Schindler 86'	12.000
1987-88	06-02-1988	155	Test	VfB	1–2	Kickers			
1988-89	20-08-1988	156	Bundesliga	VfB	4–0	Kickers	Allgöwer 18', Schäfer 45', Walter 47', 75'	—	67.940
1988-89	11-03-1989	157	Bundesliga	Kickers	0–2	VfB	—	Walter 45', Sigurvinsson 90'	29.000
1990-91	25-07-1990	158	Test	Kickers	2–2	VfB	Imhof 50', Keim 59'	Allgöwer 31', Jüptner	6.658
1991-92	02-11-1991	159	Bundesliga	VfB	3–1	Kickers	Sammer 10', Walter 63', Buck 90'	Novodomsky 40'	40.300
1991-92	02-05-1992	160	Bundesliga	Kickers	1–3	VfB	Moutas 49'	Walter 77', 90', Frontzeck 84'	36.500
2001-02	05-07-2003	161	Test	Kickers	3–2	VfB	Scharinger 28', Polat 72', Zimmermann 82'	Tiffert 60', 90'	5.500
2002-03	23-04-2003	162	Test	Kickers	2–3	VfB	Greco 43', Benda 66'	Dundee 48', Hleb 51', Carnell 76'	5.500
2008-09	25-03-2009	163	Test	Kickers	3–5	VfB	Tucci 9', 38', Tunjic 86'	Cacau 17', Šimák 55', 67', Schieber 69', Schipplock 90'	3.160
2010-11	14-07-2010	164	Test	Kickers	1–1	VfB	Marchese 37'	Funk 38'	6.000
2011-12	13-07-2011	165	Test	Kickers	1–1	VfB	Ivanusa 28'	Pogrebnyak 87'	7.100
2013-14	06-07-2013	166	Test	Kickers	0–2	VfB	—	Ibišević 55', 62'	5.800
2016-17	02-02-2017	167	Test	VfB	4–0	Kickers	Asano 19', Terodde 55', Maxim 70', Green 88'	—	
2017/18	09.07.2017	168	Testspiel	Kickers	1–1	VfB	Scepanik 5'	Donis 25'	6.100

== Head to head results ==
Competition	Games	Kickers wins	Draws	VfB wins	Goal statistic
Bundesliga	4	0	0	4	2:12
Oberliga Süd	26	5	5	16	28:52
Gauliga Württemberg	20	6	4	10	30:48
Endrunde Gauliga Württemberg	2	1	0	1	7:6
2. Bundesliga South	4	1	1	2	3:7
Bezirksliga Schwaben	2	2	0	0	18:1
Bezirksliga Württemberg-Baden	18	5	6	7	30:34
Play-off Bezirksliga Württemberg-Baden	1	1	0	0	6:1
Südkreis-Liga	4	2	1	1	12:6
Frühjahrsrunde	2	1	0	1	4:4
Herbstrunde	1	1	0	0	1:0
Kreisliga Württemberg	8	5	2	1	13:5
Süddeutsche Meisterschaft	2	1	0	1	3:5
Süddeutscher Pokal	3	1	0	2	7:8
Gaupokal Württemberg	2	2	0	0	6:4
Württemberg Cup	1	1	0	0	3:1
Stuttgarter Stadtmeisterschaft	2	0	1	1	3:6
Stuttgarter Stadtpokal	1	1	0	0	5:2
Spiel um den Ehrenpreis Stuttgarts	1	0	0	1	0:1
Testmatches	64	12	13	39	106:176
Total	168	48	33	87	287:379
