= List of Stuttgarter Kickers players =

Stuttgarter Kickers is a German professional football team formed in 1899. Throughout its history the club's first team has competed in various national and international competitions. All players who have played in 50 or more such matches are listed below.

== Key ==
- Players with name in **bold** currently play for the club.
- Years are the first and last calendar years in which the player appeared in competitive first-team football for the club.
- League appearances and goals comprise those in the Bundesliga, 2. Bundesliga, 3. Liga and the Regionalliga.
- Total appearances and goals comprise those in the Bundesliga, 2. Bundesliga, 3. Liga, Regionalliga, DFB-Pokal, and several now-defunct competitions.

== Players with 50 or more appearances ==
Appearances and goals are for first-team competitive matches only. Substitute appearances are included. Statistics are correct as of 1 January 2011.

Position key: GK – Goalkeeper; DF – Defender; MF – Midfielder; FW – Forward

Name	Nationality	Position	Stuttgarter Kickers career	League Appearances	League Goals	Total Appearances	Total Goals	Notes
Rainer Ackermann	Germany	DF	1978–1985	143	2	?	?	
Mustafa Akçay	Turkey	MF	2003–2008	121	3	?	?	
Karl Allgöwer	Germany	MF	1977–1980	116	59	?	?	
Markus Beierle	Germany	FW	1995–1998	88	39	?	?	
Sascha Benda	Germany	MF	2002–2004; 2006–2008	119	19	?	?	
Fredi Bobic	Germany	FW	1986–1990; 1992–1994	62	26	?	?	
Stefan Brasas	Germany	GK	1989–1992; 1993–1994	54	0	?	?	
Guido Buchwald	Germany	DF	1978–1983	146	18	?	?	
Eberhard Carl	Germany	FW	1997–2000	68	8	?	?	
Giuseppe Carnevale	Italy	FW	1998–2002	62	15	?	?	
Juan Arnoldo Cayasso	Costa Rica	FW	1990–1992	53	11	?	?	
Waldemar Cimander	Poland	GK	1982–1988	146	0	?	?	
Herbert Dienelt	Germany	DF	1957–1970	403	35	?	?	
Dieter Dollmann	Germany	DF	1974–1983	266	27	?	?	
Uwe Dreher	Germany	FW	1978–1983	137	66	?	?	
Frank Elser	Germany	MF	1985–1989	118	13	?	?	
Dieter Finke	Germany	MF	1981–1987	196	10	?	?	
Bashiru Gambo	Ghana	MF	2005–2009	123	23	?	?	
Rolf Gerstenlauer	Germany	GK	1974–1981	194	2	?	?	
Janusz Gora	Poland	MF	1992–1994; 1996–1997	57	4	?	?	
Kurt Goth	Germany	GK	1950–1953	50	0	?	?	
Bernd Grabosch	Germany	MF	1986–1990	94	21	?	?	
Jens Härter	Germany	DF	2004–2009	132	3	?	?	
Manuel Hartmann	Germany	DF	2005–2007	57	6	?	?	
Hans Hein	Germany	MF	1986–1989	76	14	?	?	
Ari Hjelm	Finland	FW	1988–1990	55	10	?	?	
Bernd Hoffmann	Germany	FW	1976–1979	98	31	?	?	
Demir Hotić	Bosnia and Herzegovina	FW	1987–1989; 1993–1994	82	21	?	?	
Matthias Imhof	Germany	MF	1989–1993	132	10	?	?	
Carlos Batista Rubim Ivan	Brazil	FW	2001–2004	65	10	?	?	
Sokol Kacani	Albania	FW	2006–2009	52	6	?	?	
Andreas Keim	Germany	DF	1989–1993	134	13	?	?	
Adnan Kevrić	Bosnia and Herzegovina	MF	1993–2000	205	46	?	?	
Andreas Kleinhansl	Germany	MF	1986–1989	53	2	?	?	
Jürgen Klinsmann	Germany	FW	1978–1984	61	22	?	?	
Joachim Kühn	Germany	FW	1977–1979	61	8	?	?	
Dirk Kurtenbach	Germany	FW	1986–1988	62	21	?	?	
Kari Laukkanen	Finland	GK	1987–1990	82	0	?	?	
Markus Lösch	Germany	DF	1996–1998; 2000–2001	68	3	?	?	
Alexander Malchow	Germany	MF	1996–2000; 2003–2005	139	12	?	?	
Marcus Mann	Germany	DF	2007–2009	66	3	?	?	
Carsten Marell	Germany	MF	1998–2001	83	1	?	?	
Tomislav Marić	Croatia	FW	1996–2000	112	42	?	?	
Andreas Merkle	Germany	FW	1981–1986	141	43	?	?	
Mirnes Mesic	Germany	MF	2003–2007	130	51	?	?	
Stefan Minkwitz	Germany	MF	1994; 1996–2004	205	4	?	?	
Dimitrios Moutas	Greece	FW	1990–1992; 1993–1994	98	32	?	?	
Eckhard Müller	Germany	DF	1975–1986	331	10	?	?	
Karsten Neitzel	Germany	DF	1992–1994	79	1	?	?	
Werner Nickel	Germany	MF	1979–1983	97	45	?	?	
Jochen Novodomsky	Germany	DF	1990–1994; 1996–1997	83	3	?	?	
Runald Ossen	Germany	MF	1987–1990	92	3	?	?	
Mustafa Parmak	Germany	MF	2004–2008; 2009	108	19	?	?	
Achim Pfuderer	Germany	DF	1996–2000	119	6	?	?	
Erhan Polat	Germany	MF	2001–2003	50	2	?	?	
Dirk Prediger	Germany	FW	2008–2011	50	3	?	?	
Darko Ramovš	Serbia	DF	1998–2000	63	1	?	?	
**Marcel Rapp**	Germany	DF	2007–	90	4	?	?	
Torsten Raspe	Germany	MF	1996–2001	134	3	?	?	
Klaus Reitmaier	Germany	GK	1991–1993	76	0	?	?	
Thomas Ritter	Germany	DF	1990–1992; 2000–2001	76	1	?	?	
Josef Saile	Germany	FW	1977–1980	66	14	?	?	
Markus Sailer	Germany	FW	1996–1999	98	18	?	?	
Alois Schindler	Germany	DF	1974–1977	100	1	?	?	
Bernd Schindler	Germany	DF	1983–1989	196	11	?	?	
Frieder Schömezler	Germany	MF	1976–1979	70	0	?	?	
Alfred Schön	Germany	DF	1988–1990	64	1	?	?	
Karl-Heinz Schroff	Germany	FW	1974–1978	78	17	?	?	
Wolfgang Schüler	Germany	MF	1988–1990	60	27	?	?	
Alois Schwartz	Germany	MF	1987–1993	160	12	?	?	
Zoltán Sebescen	Germany	MF	1982–1999	73	5	?	?	
Alfred Steinkirchner	Austria	MF	1980–1982	55	12	?	?	
Peter Stichler	Germany	DF	1976–1981; 1985–1986	179	24	?	?	
**Oliver Stierle**	Germany	MF	2001–2008; 2010–2011	157	8	?	?	
Klaus Täuber	Germany	FW	1980–1983	99	49	?	?	
Franz-Josef Toth	Germany	MF	1974–1979	97	5	?	?	
Marco Tucci	Germany	FW	2005–2009	57	11	?	?	
Angelo Vaccaro	Italy	FW	2007–2009	58	20	?	?	
Heinz-Jürgen Voise	Germany	FW	1975–1982	126	8	?	?	
Werner Vollack	Germany	GK	1980–1982	88	0	?	?	
Ralf Vollmer	Germany	FW	1983–1994	336	70	?	?	
Thomas Walter	Germany	GK	1996–1999	89	0	?	?	
Marco Wildersinn	Germany	DF	2005–2008	61	0	?	?	
Eugen Wieland	Germany	DF	1966–1969	44	4	?	?	
Wolfgang Wolf	Germany	DF	1988–1992	131	9	?	?	
Dirk Wüllbier	Germany	DF	1992–1999	118	3	?	?	
David Yelldell	Germany	GK	2005–2008	100	0	?	?	
Recep Yıldız	Turkey	MF	2005–2008	64	6	?	?	
