= Schönfelder =

Schönfelder or Schoenfelder is a German surname. People with the surname include:

- Adolph Schönfelder (1875–1966), German politician
- Anke Schönfelder (born 1975), German gymnast
- Erich Schönfelder (1885–1933), German screenwriter, actor, and film director
- Floy Schoenfelder (1919–2000), American polio survivor advocate
- Friedrich Schoenfelder (1916–2011), German actor and voice artist
- Helmut Schönfelder (1914–2003), German Luftwaffe pilot
- Gerd Schönfelder (born 1970), German para-alpine skier
- Karl-Heinz Schönfelder (1923–2018), German historian of modern literature
- Olivier Schoenfelder (born 1977), French ice dancer
- Rainer Schönfelder (born 1977), Austrian former skier
