= Janáček Philharmonic Orchestra =

Czech orchestra based in Ostrava

The Janáček Philharmonic Orchestra (Janáčkova filharmonie Ostrava) is a Czech orchestra based in Ostrava. Named after composer Leoš Janáček, the orchestra performs its concerts at the City of Ostrava Cultural Centre.

== History ==
The roots of the orchestra date back to 1929, with the establishment of a radio orchestra in Ostrava. In 1954, the orchestra was formally established under the name of the Ostrava Symphony Orchestra, with Otakar Pařík as its first chief conductor under that name, and gave its first concert under that name on 3 May 1954. In 1962, the orchestra changed its name to the Státní filharmonie Ostrava (Ostrava State Philharmonic Orchestra), then with Václav Jiráček as chief conductor. In 1971, the orchestra changed its name to its current form, the Janáčkova filharmonie Ostrava (Janáček Philharmonic Ostrava). In the 1990s, the orchestra developed a new emphasis on performance of contemporary music, including renditions of compositions by composers such as Earle Brown, John Cage, Maria de Alvear, Morton Feldman, Petr Kotik, Alvin Lucier, Pauline Oliveros, Somei Satoh, Martin Smolka, Karlheinz Stockhausen, Toru Takemitsu, Edgard Varese, and Christian Wolff.

In December 2018, Vassily Sinaisky first guest-conducted the orchestra. He returned for a second guest-conducting engagement at the start of the 2019-2020 season. In April 2020, the orchestra announced the appointment of Sinaisky as its next chief conductor, effective with the 2020-2021 season. Petr Popelka became principal guest conductor as of the 2020-2021 season. Sinaisky concluded his tenure as chief conductor of the orchestra at the close of the 2023-2024 season.

In May 2024, the orchestra announced the appointment of Daniel Raiskin as its next chief conductor, effective with the 2026-2027 season. He held the title of principal guest conductor from 2024 to 2026.

== Chief conductors ==
- Otakar Pařík (1954–1955)
- Jiří Waldhans (1955–1962)
- Václav Jiráček (1962–1966)
- Josef Daniel (1966–1968)
- Otakar Trhlík (1968–1987)
- Tomáš Koutník (1987–1990)
- Dennis Burkh
- Leoš Svárovský (1991–1993)
- Christian Arming (1996–2002)
- Petr Vronský (2002–2004)
- Theodore Kuchar (2005–2012)
- Heiko Mathias Förster (2014–2019)
- Vassily Sinaisky (2020–2024)
- Daniel Raiskin (2026–present)
