= 1991–92 Bundesliga =

29th season of the Bundesliga

Bundesliga
- Season: 1991–92
- Dates: 2 August 1991 – 16 May 1992
- Champions: VfB Stuttgart; 2nd Bundesliga title 4th German title
- Relegated: Stuttgarter Kickers; Hansa Rostock; MSV Duisburg; Fortuna Düsseldorf
- Champions League: VfB Stuttgart
- UEFA Cup: Borussia Dortmund; Eintracht Frankfurt; 1. FC Köln; 1. FC Kaiserslautern
- Goals: 968
- Average goals/game: 2.55
- Top goalscorer: Fritz Walter (22)
- Biggest home win: five games with a differential of +5 each (twice 6–1, three times 5–0)
- Biggest away win: Bochum 0–5 FC Bayern (20 February 1992)
- Highest scoring: Duisburg 3–6 Frankfurt (9 goals) (1 November 1991)

The 1991–92 Bundesliga was the 29th season of the Bundesliga, Germany's premier football league. It began on 2 August 1991 and ended on 16 May 1992. 1. FC Kaiserslautern were the defending champions.

As Germany had been reunified on 3 October 1990, this was the first season that the Bundesliga contained teams from the former East Germany.

== Competition format ==
Owing to the incorporation of two teams from former East Germany, the number of clubs was extended to 20, being reduced to the ″traditional″ number of 18 immediately after this one season. Hence, the season consisted of 38 matchdays. Every team played two games against each other team, one at home and one away. Teams received two points for a win and one point for a draw. If two or more teams were tied on points, places were determined by goal difference and, if still tied, by goals scored. The team with the most points were crowned champions while the four teams with the fewest points were relegated to 2. Bundesliga (to be replaced by just two teams from that league).

== Team changes to 1990–91 ==
Bayer 05 Uerdingen and Hertha BSC were directly relegated to the 2. Bundesliga after finishing in the last two places. They were replaced by FC Schalke 04 and MSV Duisburg. Uerdingen and Hertha BSC were eventually joined in demotion by relegation/promotion play-off participant FC St. Pauli, who lost on aggregate against Stuttgarter Kickers.

Due to German reunification, teams from the former DDR-Oberliga were also accommodated to the Bundesliga. These were the best two teams of the 1990–91 season, Hansa Rostock and Dynamo Dresden.

== Season overview ==
The season saw some surprises, including Hansa Rostock being at the top of the league table early in the season, and Bayern Munich only finishing mid-table. On the final matchday, three teams had chances to win the Bundesliga title: Eintracht Frankfurt, VfB Stuttgart and Borussia Dortmund each had 50 points before kick-off, and all three had an away match to play. Frankfurt seemed to have the easiest task, but lost 1–2 to Rostock and only finished third. They were overtaken by Stuttgart who won 2–1 at Bayer Leverkusen and achieved their 4th German championship. Dortmund won 1–0 at MSV Duisburg and finished second.

Despite their 2–1 win, Rostock were relegated, along with Fortuna Düsseldorf, Duisburg and Stuttgarter Kickers. Out of the teams that had been promoted from Bundesliga Two, FC Schalke 04 were the only one to stay in the league. Dynamo Dresden remained as the only team from Eastern Germany.

== Team overview ==
Location of teams in Bundesliga 1991–92

Club	Location	Ground	Capacity
VfL Bochum	Bochum	Ruhrstadion	40,000
SV Werder Bremen	Bremen	Weserstadion	32,000
Borussia Dortmund	Dortmund	Westfalenstadion	52,616
Dynamo Dresden	Dresden	Rudolf-Harbig-Stadion	30,000
MSV Duisburg	Duisburg	Wedaustadion	31,500
Fortuna Düsseldorf	Düsseldorf	Rheinstadion	59,600
Eintracht Frankfurt	Frankfurt	Waldstadion	62,000
Hamburger SV	Hamburg	Volksparkstadion	62,000
1. FC Kaiserslautern	Kaiserslautern	Fritz-Walter-Stadion	38,500
Karlsruher SC	Karlsruhe	Wildparkstadion	50,000
1. FC Köln	Cologne	Müngersdorfer Stadion	55,000
Bayer 04 Leverkusen	Leverkusen	Ulrich-Haberland-Stadion	27,800
Borussia Mönchengladbach	Mönchengladbach	Bökelbergstadion	34,500
FC Bayern Munich	Munich	Olympiastadion	70,000
1. FC Nürnberg	Nuremberg	Frankenstadion	55,000
F.C. Hansa Rostock	Rostock	Ostseestadion	25,000
FC Schalke 04	Gelsenkirchen	Parkstadion	70,000
Stuttgarter Kickers	Stuttgart	Neckarstadion	68,000
VfB Stuttgart	Stuttgart	Neckarstadion	68,000
SG Wattenscheid 09	Wattenscheid	Lohrheidestadion	15,000

== League table ==
Pos	Team	Pld	W	D	L	GF	GA	GD	Pts	Qualification or relegation
1	VfB Stuttgart (C)	38	21	10	7	62	32	+30	52	Qualification to Champions League first round
2	Borussia Dortmund	38	20	12	6	66	47	+19	52	Qualification to UEFA Cup first round
3	Eintracht Frankfurt	38	18	14	6	76	41	+35	50	Qualification to UEFA Cup first round
4	1. FC Köln	38	13	18	7	58	41	+17	44	Qualification to UEFA Cup first round
5	1. FC Kaiserslautern	38	17	10	11	58	42	+16	44	Qualification to UEFA Cup first round
6	Bayer Leverkusen	38	15	13	10	53	39	+14	43	
7	1. FC Nürnberg	38	18	7	13	54	51	+3	43	
8	Karlsruher SC	38	16	9	13	48	50	−2	41	
9	Werder Bremen	38	11	16	11	44	45	−1	38	Qualification to Cup Winners' Cup first round
10	Bayern Munich	38	13	10	15	59	61	−2	36	
11	Schalke 04	38	11	12	15	45	45	0	34	
12	Hamburger SV	38	9	16	13	32	43	−11	34	
13	Borussia Mönchengladbach	38	10	14	14	37	49	−12	34	
14	Dynamo Dresden	38	12	10	16	34	50	−16	34	
15	VfL Bochum	38	10	13	15	38	55	−17	33	
16	SG Wattenscheid 09	38	9	14	15	50	60	−10	32	
17	Stuttgarter Kickers (R)	38	10	11	17	53	64	−11	31	Relegation to 2. Bundesliga
18	Hansa Rostock (R)	38	10	11	17	43	55	−12	31	Relegation to 2. Bundesliga
19	MSV Duisburg (R)	38	7	16	15	43	55	−12	30	Relegation to 2. Bundesliga
20	Fortuna Düsseldorf (R)	38	6	12	20	41	69	−28	24	Relegation to 2. Bundesliga

Source: www.dfb.de
Rules for classification: 1) points; 2) goal difference; 3) number of goals scored.
The league contracted back to 18 teams for the 1992–93 season.
(C) Champions; (R) Relegated

== Results ==
Home \ Away	BOC	SVW	BVB	SGD	DUI	F95	SGE	HSV	FCK	KSC	KOE	B04	BMG	FCB	FCN	ROS	S04	SKI	VFB	SGW
VfL Bochum	—	2–2	0–0	1–0	2–1	3–0	0–0	2–3	0–0	1–3	2–2	0–2	3–1	0–5	0–3	3–2	1–0	2–2	0–2	1–1
Werder Bremen	3–0	—	0–1	2–0	5–1	2–1	1–0	1–1	0–2	0–0	1–3	1–1	0–0	1–1	1–3	1–0	2–1	1–3	1–1	2–2
Borussia Dortmund	1–1	2–1	—	4–0	2–1	3–1	2–2	2–2	3–1	1–0	3–1	3–1	2–2	3–0	3–2	4–1	2–0	3–1	0–0	1–1
Dynamo Dresden	0–0	2–1	0–0	—	0–0	2–0	2–1	3–0	0–1	2–0	0–0	1–0	1–2	0–2	1–2	2–1	2–1	2–2	1–0	3–0
MSV Duisburg	1–1	0–0	0–1	3–0	—	2–2	3–6	0–1	1–1	6–2	1–3	1–2	1–1	1–1	3–0	2–0	2–0	1–1	1–0	0–0
Fortuna Düsseldorf	3–0	0–0	1–1	1–3	1–1	—	1–2	1–0	1–0	2–3	1–3	1–1	1–1	0–1	1–2	0–0	1–1	1–3	0–3	4–3
Eintracht Frankfurt	2–1	2–2	3–0	3–0	3–0	1–1	—	2–1	2–0	1–1	1–2	0–1	0–0	3–2	2–2	2–0	5–0	6–1	1–1	1–1
Hamburger SV	0–0	0–1	1–1	2–0	1–1	1–1	2–1	—	0–1	0–1	1–1	1–1	1–0	1–0	0–2	1–0	2–1	0–3	1–1	0–1
1. FC Kaiserslautern	1–1	2–2	4–0	4–1	2–1	2–0	1–1	0–0	—	3–0	2–1	2–1	4–2	4–0	3–0	3–0	1–1	4–3	0–0	3–2
Karlsruher SC	1–1	2–1	2–2	1–0	2–2	1–5	0–2	4–1	2–1	—	0–1	0–0	2–0	3–0	1–0	2–1	1–0	3–1	0–0	1–2
1. FC Köln	1–0	5–0	1–2	1–1	1–1	4–1	1–1	0–0	1–1	2–3	—	1–1	1–1	1–1	4–0	3–1	3–0	0–0	1–1	1–1
Bayer Leverkusen	2–0	0–0	0–2	4–0	2–1	1–1	1–3	1–1	3–0	2–0	1–1	—	1–0	2–1	0–1	3–0	2–1	3–1	1–2	6–1
Borussia Mönchengladbach	1–2	0–2	1–1	1–0	0–0	3–1	1–1	1–0	1–0	1–0	2–2	2–2	—	1–1	1–0	1–1	1–1	2–1	0–1	1–0
Bayern Munich	0–2	3–4	0–3	1–2	4–2	3–1	3–3	2–0	1–0	1–0	0–0	2–2	3–0	—	1–3	1–2	3–2	1–4	1–0	5–2
1. FC Nürnberg	1–0	1–0	2–1	1–1	1–1	3–1	1–3	1–1	3–2	1–2	4–0	1–0	2–1	1–1	—	0–0	0–1	2–0	4–3	3–1
Hansa Rostock	0–2	0–0	5–1	3–0	0–0	3–1	2–1	1–2	0–1	1–2	1–1	2–2	2–1	2–1	4–0	—	2–0	2–2	2–0	1–1
Schalke 04	2–1	0–0	5–2	1–1	3–0	0–0	1–1	0–0	2–0	3–1	3–0	0–0	3–1	1–1	1–0	5–0	—	1–2	0–1	1–1
Stuttgarter Kickers	2–0	2–1	0–1	0–0	0–1	0–1	0–2	1–1	1–1	1–1	0–3	0–1	3–0	2–4	3–1	1–1	1–1	—	1–3	3–0
VfB Stuttgart	4–1	1–1	4–2	1–1	2–0	3–1	1–2	3–2	4–1	1–0	1–0	2–0	0–1	3–2	2–0	3–0	1–0	3–1	—	1–1
SG Wattenscheid	1–2	0–1	0–1	3–0	2–0	4–1	2–4	1–1	1–0	1–1	1–2	3–0	3–2	0–0	1–1	0–0	1–2	4–1	1–3	—

Source: DFB
Legend: Blue = home team win; Yellow = draw; Red = away team win.

== Top goalscorers ==
22 goals

- (Germany) Fritz Walter (VfB Stuttgart)

20 goals

- (Switzerland) Stéphane Chapuisat (Borussia Dortmund)

17 goals

- (Germany) Roland Wohlfarth (FC Bayern Munich)

15 goals

- (Ghana) Tony Yeboah (Eintracht Frankfurt)

14 goals

- (Germany) Lothar Sippel (Eintracht Frankfurt)

13 goals

- (Germany) Marcus Marin (Stuttgarter Kickers)
- (Germany) Michael Spies (Hansa Rostock)
- (Germany) Michael Tönnies (MSV Duisburg)

12 goals

- (Germany) Marco Bode (SV Werder Bremen)
- (Germany) Dieter Eckstein (1. FC Nürnberg)
- (Germany) Ulf Kirsten (Bayer 04 Leverkusen)
- (Germany) Andreas Möller (Eintracht Frankfurt)
- (Greece) Dimitrios Moutas (Stuttgarter Kickers)

== Attendances ==
No.	Team	Attendance	Change	Highest
1	Schalke 04	47,468	37.0%	70,200
2	Borussia Dortmund	44,355	23.5%	52,616
3	1. FC Nürnberg	38,053	63.1%	52,500
4	VfB Stuttgart	33,789	17.0%	67,900
5	1. FC Kaiserslautern	33,672	4.7%	38,500
6	Bayern München	32,526	-9.4%	65,000
7	Eintracht Frankfurt	29,868	22.9%	60,500
8	1. FC Köln	23,105	8.8%	47,000
9	Hamburger SV	22,604	-5.8%	52,400
10	Borussia Mönchengladbach	21,679	12.4%	34,500
11	MSV Duisburg	21,654	67.8%	31,500
12	VfL Bochum	18,737	-0.3%	41,000
13	Karlsruher SC	17,921	-2.0%	30,000
14	Werder Bremen	17,388	-14.8%	33,000
15	Dynamo Dresden	16,642	66.2%	30,000
16	Bayer Leverkusen	15,216	11.7%	26,000
17	Wattenscheid 09	14,326	5.2%	39,000
18	Fortuna Düsseldorf	14,000	-15.6%	40,000
19	Hansa Rostock	13,668	36.3%	25,000
20	Stuttgarter Kickers	12,653	93.5%	36,500

== See also ==
- 1991–92 2. Bundesliga
- 1991–92 DFB-Pokal
