= Karl-Heinz =

Karl-Heinz is a German given name, composed of Karl and Heinz but with a hyphen dash. Notable people with that name include:

- Karl-Heinz Feldkamp (born 1934), football player and coach
- Karl-Heinz Florenz (born 1947), German Member of the European Parliament
- Karl-Heinz Granitza (born 1951), German football player
- Karl-Heinz Grasser (born 1969), Austrian politician
- Karl-Heinz Greisert (1908–1942), German World War II Luftwaffe Ace
- Karl-Heinz Irmer (1903–1975), German field hockey player
- Karl-Heinz Keitel (1914–?), Waffen-SS officer and son of Wilhelm Keitel
- Karl-Heinz Kipp, German businessperson
- Karl-Heinz Köpcke (1922–1991), German journalist
- Karl-Heinz "Charly" Körbel (born 1954), German football defender
- Karl-Heinz Krüger (born 1953), boxer
- Karl-Heinz Kunde (1938–2018), German cyclist
- Karl-Heinz Lambertz (born 1952), jurist and politician
- Karl-Heinz von Liebezeit (born 1960), German television actor
- Karl-Heinz Luck (1945–2024), East German Nordic combined skier
- Karl-Heinz Metzner (1923–1994), German footballer
- Karl-Heinz Riedle (born 1965), German footballer
- Karl-Heinz Rosch (1926–1944), German soldier
- Karl-Heinz Rummenigge (born 1955), footballer
- Karl-Heinz Schnellinger (1939–2024), German footballer
- Karl-Heinz Schönfelder (1923–2018), German historian
- Karl-Heinz Smuda (born 1961), German journalist
- Karl-Heinz Stadtmüller (1953–2018), East German race walker
- Karl-Heinz Streibich (born 1952), German manager
- Karl-Heinz Tritschler (born 1949), football referee from Germany
- Hilarios Karl-Heinz Ungerer, German bishop
- Karl-Heinz Urban (born 1972), New Zealand actor
- Karl-Heinz Vosgerau (1927–2021), German television actor
- Karl-Heinz Weisenseel (born 1954), West German sprinter

== See also ==
- Carl-Heinz
- Karlheinz
- Karl Heinz Bohrer (1932–2021), German literary scholar and essayist
- Karl Heinz Bremer (1911–1942), German historian
