= Adam Matysek =

Polish footballer and executive (born 1968)

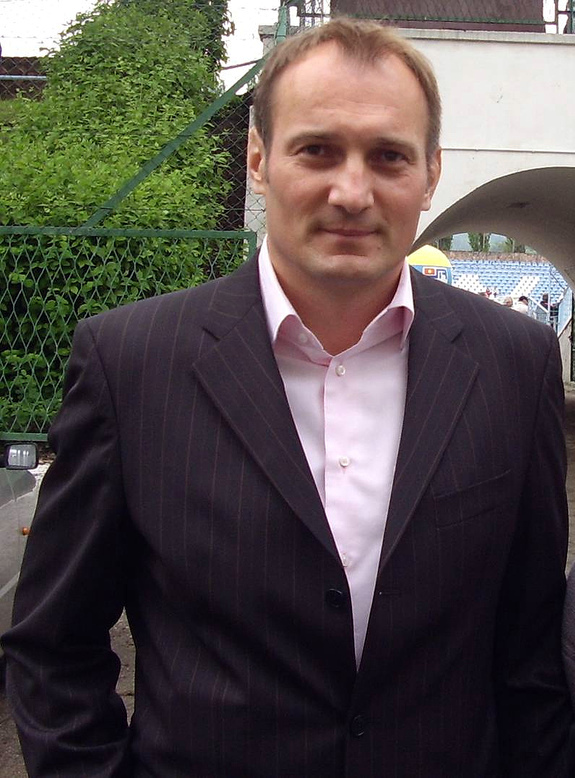

Personal information
- Full name: Adam Matysek
- Date of birth: 19 July 1968 (age 58)
- Place of birth: Piekary Śląskie, Poland
- Height: 1.93 m (6 ft 4 in)
- Position: Goalkeeper

Youth career
- 1985–1989: Zagłębie Wałbrzych

Senior career*
Years	Team	Apps	(Gls)
1989–1993	Śląsk Wrocław	110	(0)
1993–1996	Fortuna Köln	54	(0)
1996–1998	FC Gütersloh	64	(0)
1998–2001	Bayer Leverkusen	78	(0)
2001	Zagłębie Lubin	5	(0)
2002	RKS Radomsko	11	(0)
Total		322	(0)

International career
1991–2002	Poland	34	(0)
- * Club domestic league appearances and goals

Adam Matysek (Polish pronunciation: [ˈadam maˈtɨsɛk]) (born 19 July 1968) is a Polish former professional footballer who played as a goalkeeper. He was most recently a board member of I liga club Odra Opole.

He made 34 appearances for the Poland national team, and was a member of their squad at the 2002 FIFA World Cup, although he did not play any matches at the tournament.

== Post-playing career ==
After his retirement, Matysek worked for the Polish Football Association as their U21 goalkeeping coach. He was then recruited by Martin Bader, the director of football at 1. FC Nürnberg, for the same role.

From 23 November 2016 until 19 February 2018, he served as the sporting director of his former club, Śląsk Wrocław. On 16 February 2023, he was named chairman of another Ekstraklasa side Górnik Zabrze, a role he held until 7 December 2023.

On 27 September 2024, Matysek joined Odra Opole's management board, and left the club in mid-June 2025.

== Personal life ==
Matysek is married and has two daughters.

== Career statistics ==
=== International ===
Appearances, conceded goals and clean sheets by national team
National team	Year	Apps	Conceded Goals	Clean Sheets
Poland	1991	3	2	2
Poland	1992	3	1	2
Poland	1993	7	7	3
Poland	1998	6	6	3
Poland	1999	9	8	5
Poland	2000	2	0	2
Poland	2001	3	1	2
Poland	2002	1	0	1
Total		34	25	20
