= Eschweiler =

Eschweiler Eischwiele (Eischwiele Platt)
- Town
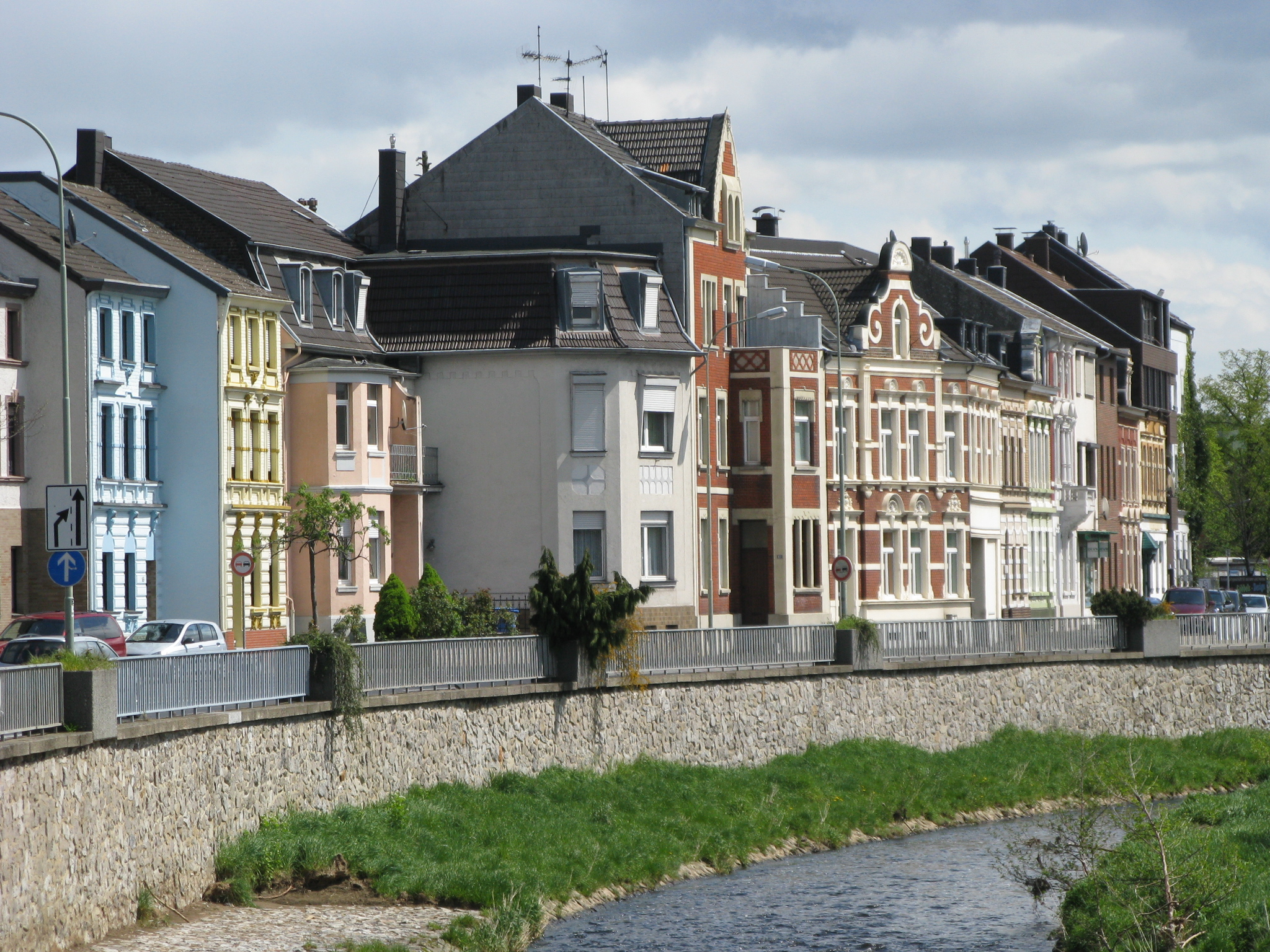
- Indestraße in Eschweiler

- Coat of arms

- Location of Eschweiler within Aachen district
- Interactive map of Eschweiler
- Location within Germany Location within North Rhine-Westphalia
- Coordinates: 50°49′N 6°17′E
- Country: Germany
- State: North Rhine-Westphalia
- Admin. region: Cologne
- District: Aachen
- Subdivisions: 22

Government
  - Mayor (2020–25): Nadine Leonhardt (SPD)

Area
  - Total: 75.75 km^{2} (29.25 sq mi)
- Elevation: 110–262 m (361–860 ft)

Population (2025-12-31)
  - Total: 57,573
  - Density: 760.0/km^{2} (1,968/sq mi)
- Time zone: UTC+01:00 (CET)
  - Summer (DST): UTC+02:00 (CEST)
- Postal codes: 52249
- Dialling codes: 02403
- Vehicle registration: AC, MON
- Website: www.eschweiler.de

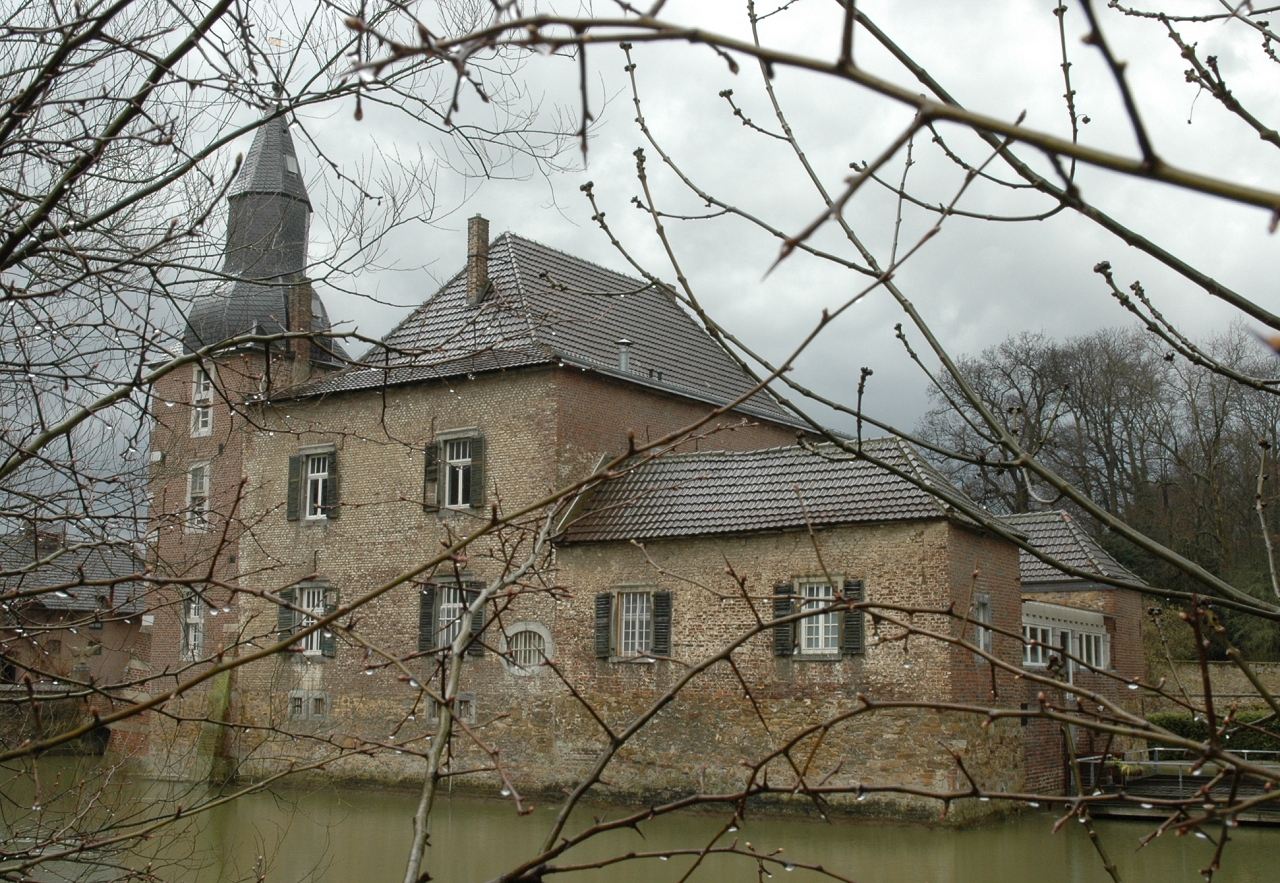
Castle of Kambach

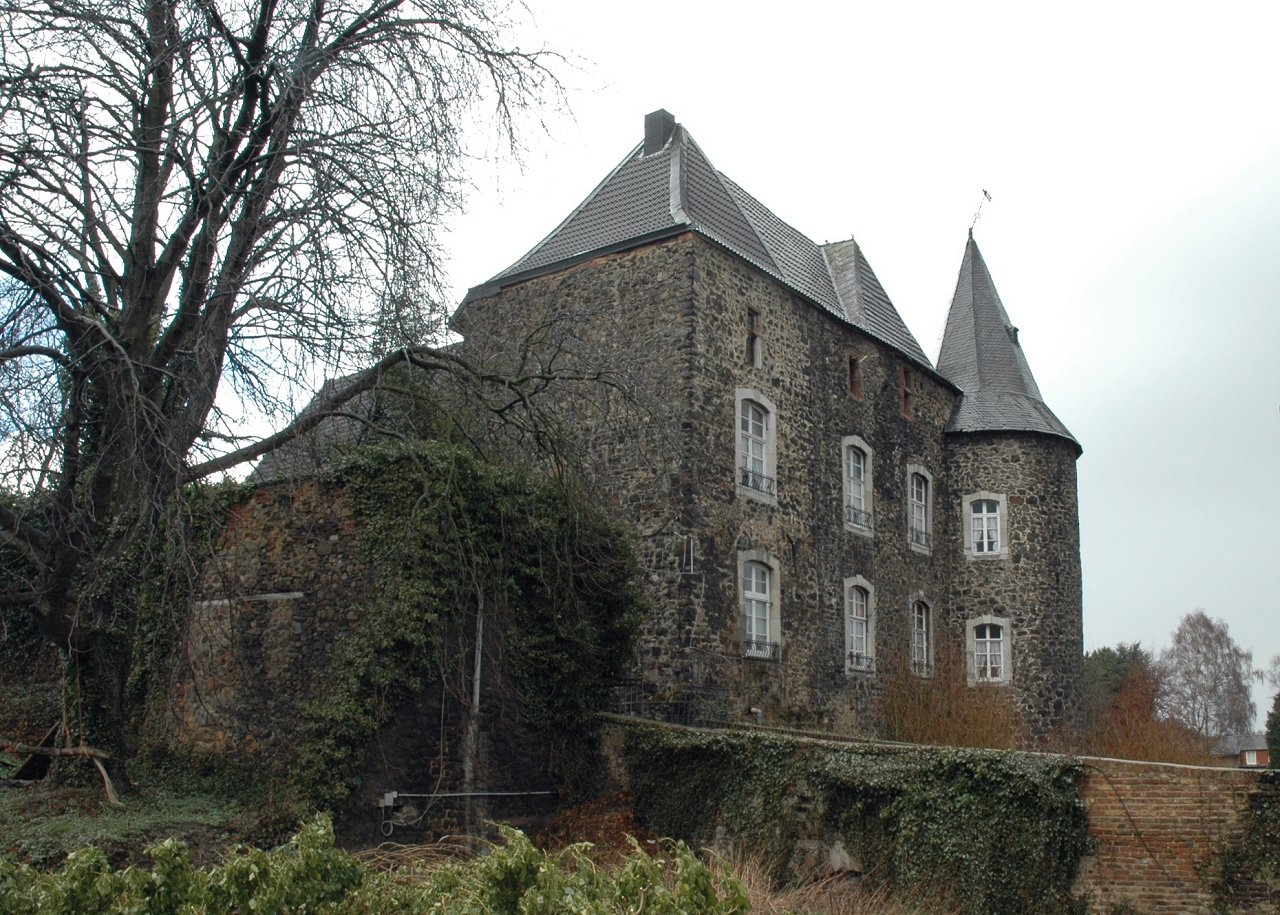
Castle of Roethgen

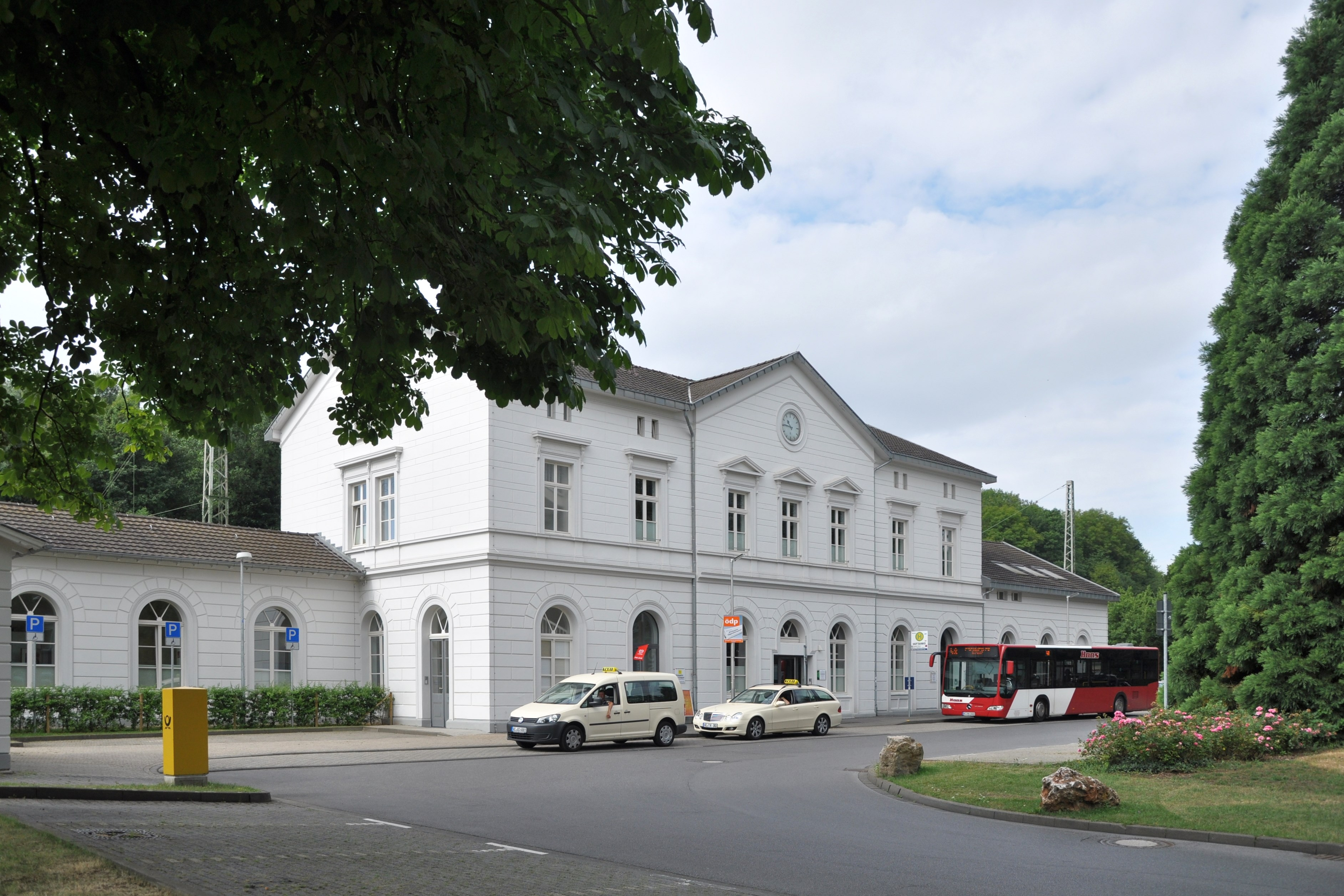
Eschweiler Central Station

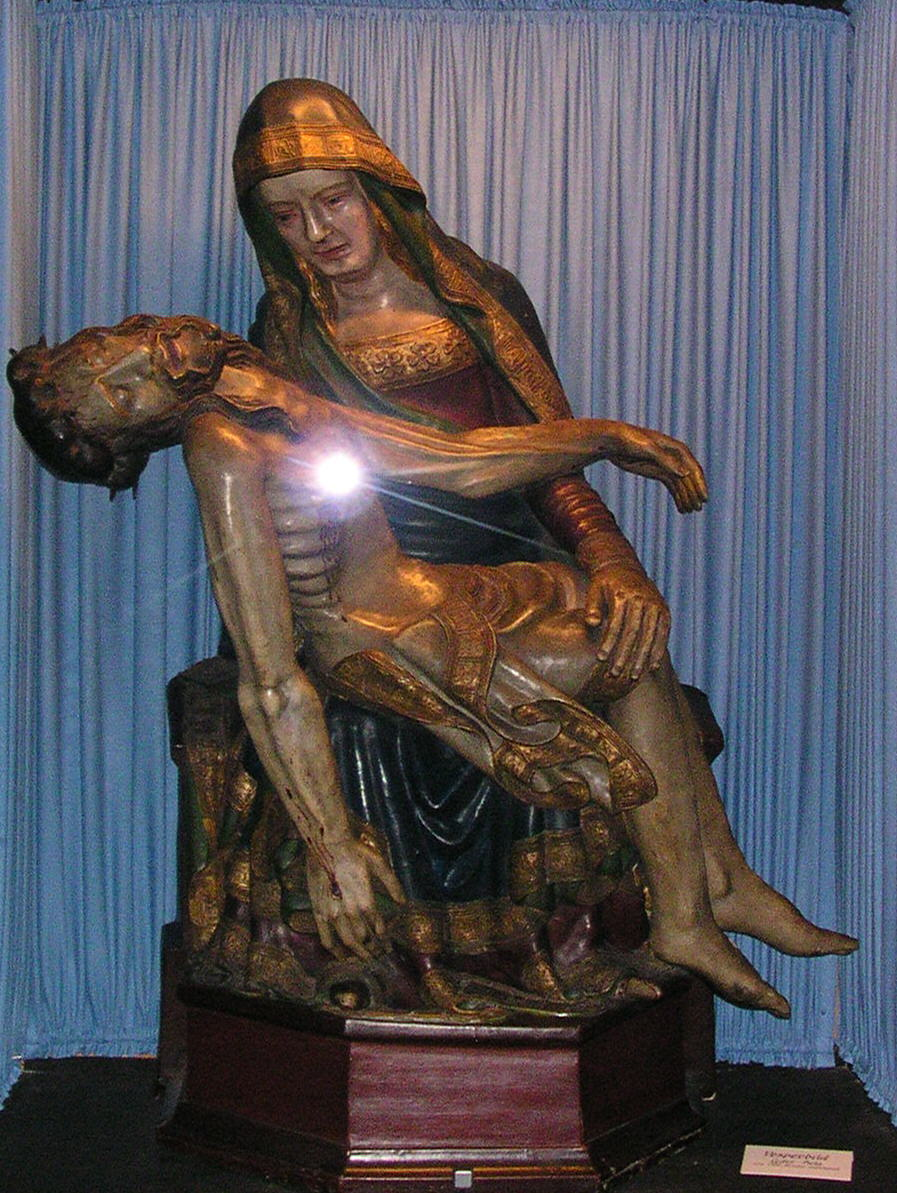
The Leather Pietà

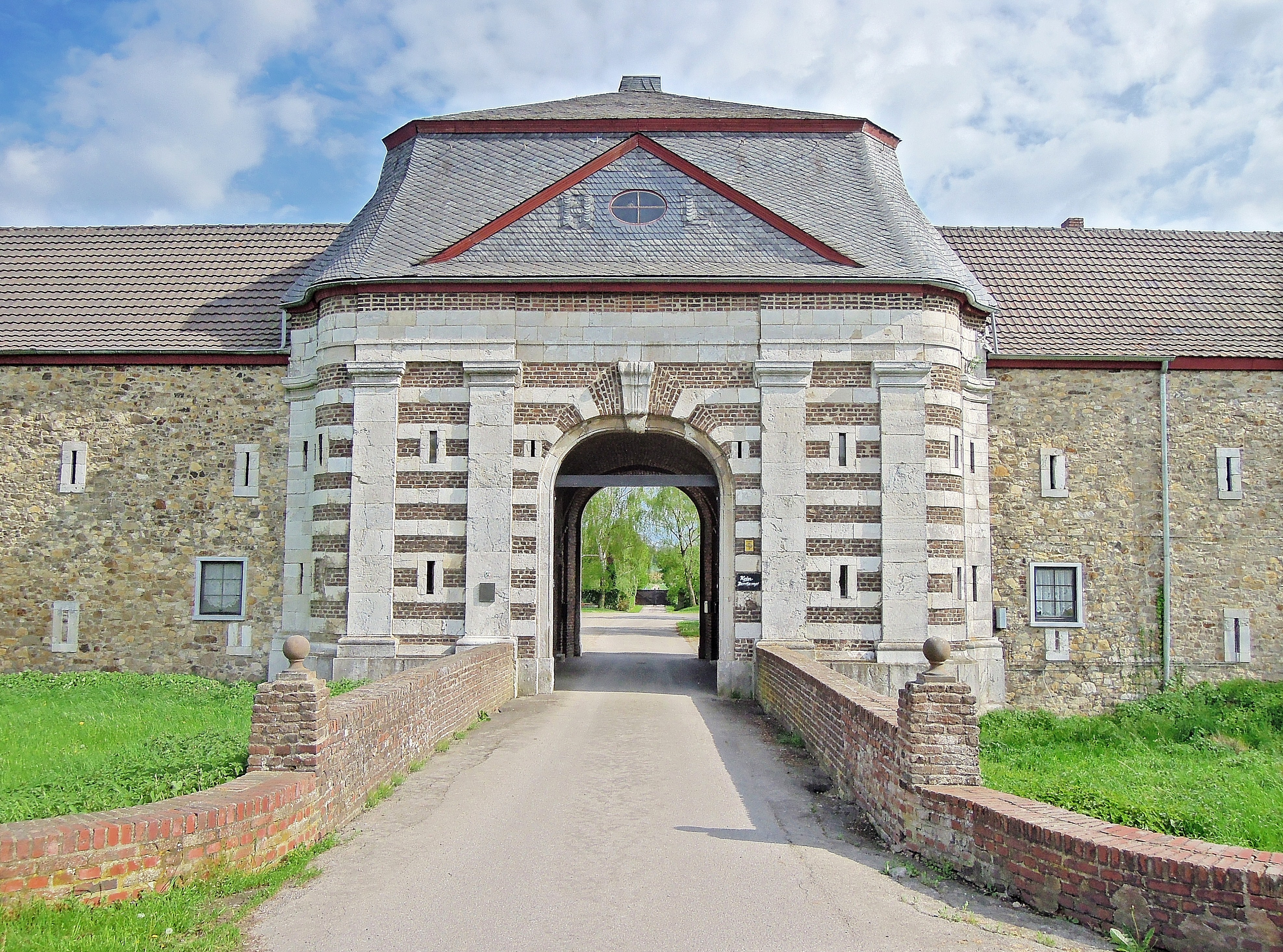
Castle of Palant

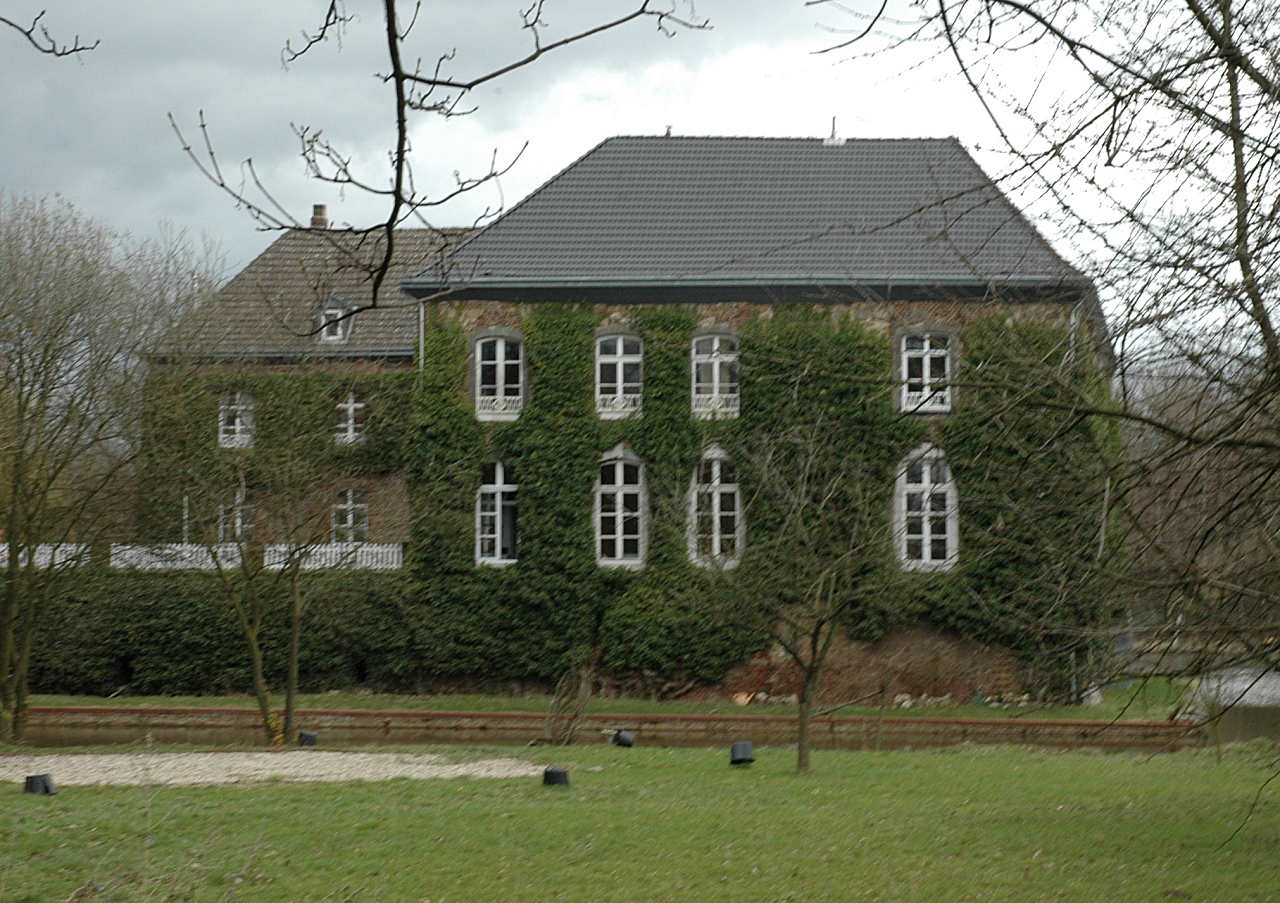
Castle of Kinzweiler

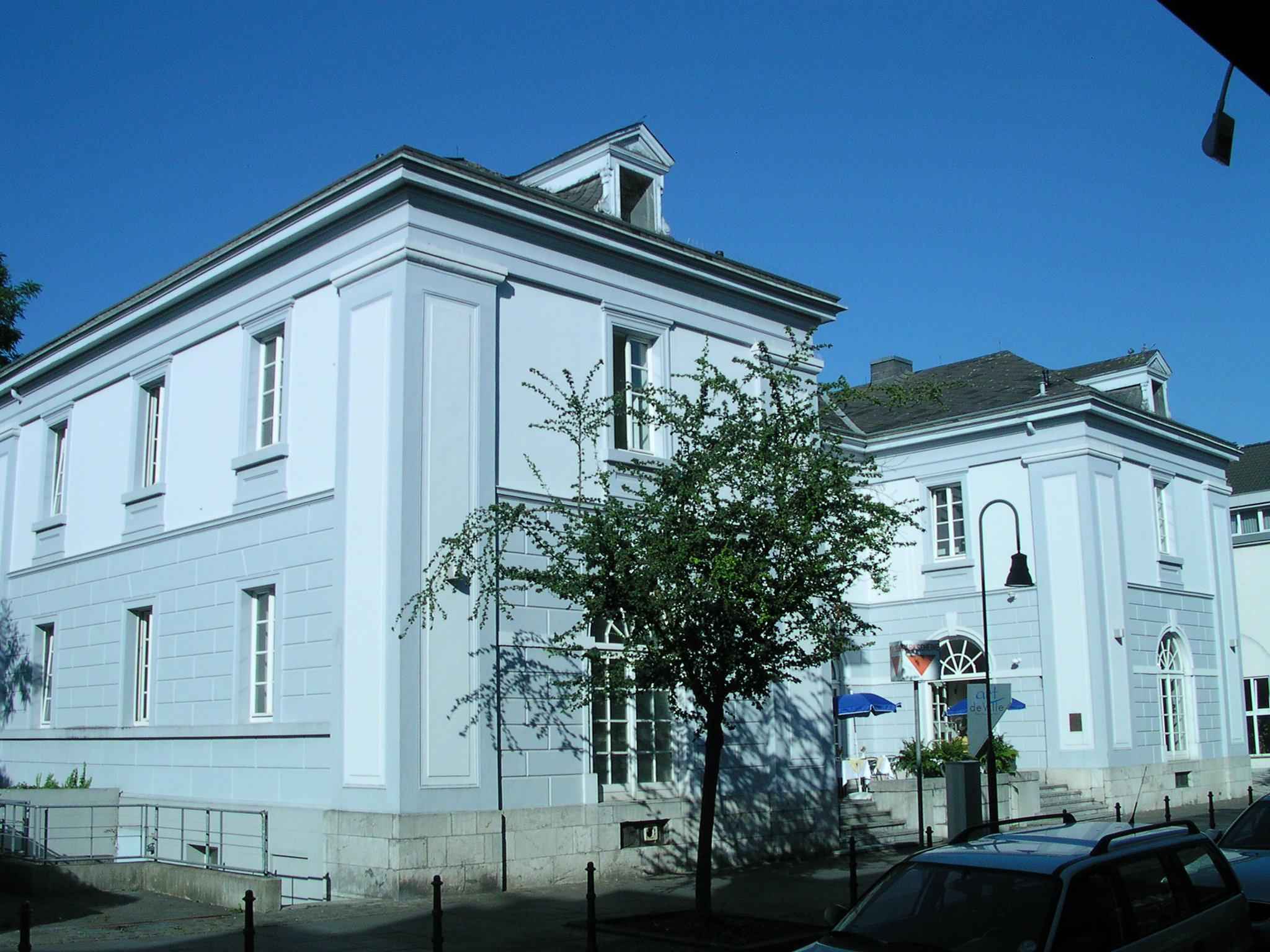
Old Townhall

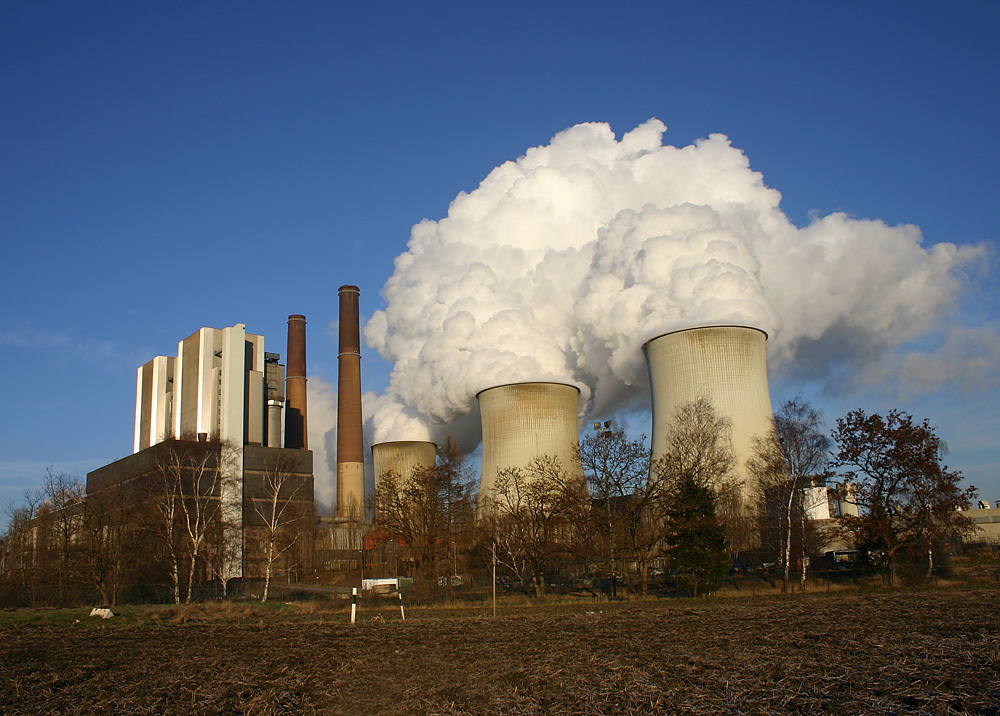
Weisweiler power plant

Eschweiler (German pronunciation: [ˈɛʃvaɪlɐ], Ripuarian: Eischwiele) is a municipality in the district of Aachen in North Rhine-Westphalia in Germany on the river Inde, near the German-Dutch-Belgian border, and about 15 kilometres (9 mi) east of Aachen and 50 kilometres (31 mi) west of Cologne.

== History ==
- Celts (first ore mining) and Romans (roads and villae rusticae).
- 828: First mentioned by Einhard, the biographer of Charlemagne.
- 1394: Coal mining first mentioned.
- For some centuries part of the Duchy of Jülich.
- 1678: Almost completely destroyed by troops of King Louis XIV of France; nearly all dwellings in the town centre were burned to the ground, and the church of St. Peter und Paul heavily damaged. The valuable leather Pietà was rescued from the flames.
- 1794: Given to France.
- 1800: French municipal rights and capital of the Canton of Eschweiler in the French Département de la Roer.
- 1816: Given to Prussia. The French Cantons of Burtscheid and Eschweiler are put together to form the Prussian Kreis Aachen.
- 1838: The Eschweiler Bergwerksverein (EBV; Eschweiler Mining Company) was formally constituted, becoming the first mining joint-stock company in the Kingdom of Prussia.
- 1858: Prussian municipal rights. Its quarters Hehlrath, Kinzweiler and St. Jöris are released in order to form the new municipality of Kinzweiler.
- 1932: Hastenrath and Nothberg become a part of Eschweiler.
- 1944: Heavily destroyed in World War II; the last coal mine was flooded during the war and never reopened.
- 1946: Part of the federal land of North Rhine-Westphalia.
- 1960s: Complete modernization of Eschweiler's downtown and regulation of the Inde to prevent regular flooding.
- 1972: Reorganization of administration in North Rhine-Westphalia: Eschweiler increases overnight from some 38,000 inhabitants to about 55,000 by receiving the villages Dürwiß, Laurenzberg, Lohn and Weisweiler. Kinzweiler, after 114 years, comes back.
- 1970s: Eschweiler loses seven quarters because of brown-coal opencast mining: Erberich, Hausen, Langendorf, Laurenzberg, Lohn, Lürken and Pützlohn.

== Population ==
Historical population

Year	Pop.	±% p.a.
1965	54,818	—
1970	53,861	−0.35%
1975	53,607	−0.09%
1980	53,475	−0.05%
1985	52,784	−0.26%
1990	54,675	+0.71%
1995	56,171	+0.54%

Year	Pop.	±% p.a.
2000	55,090	−0.39%
2005	55,691	+0.22%
2010	55,505	−0.07%
2015	55,909	+0.15%
2020	56,172	+0.09%
2025	57,573	+0.49%

Source: Landesdatabank Nordrhein-Westfalen

== Main sights ==
Eschweiler main sights include:

- Artificial lake Blausteinsee ("Blue Stone Lake")
- the Old Townhall (which is now the restaurant and conference wing of a hotel)
- two pilgrim churches
- main parish church of St. Peter und Paul with the Leather Pietà from around 1360
- the chapel
- dwelling house of the former Cistercians nunnery of St. Jöris, skull relic in St. Jöris' church, baroque altar in Hehlrath's church
- Old Mill of Gressenich

Also present is a series of castles and manors:

- Castle of Eschweiler (only three towers from the 13th century are left)
- Castle of Kambach (beautiful water castle beside the golf course)
- Castle of Kinzweiler
- Castle of Nothberg
- Castle of Palant
- Castle of Röthgen
- Castle of Weisweiler (only the towers and the outer walls are left)
- Manor of Broich
- Manor of Drimborn
- Manor of Nothberg

== Culture ==
Eschweiler has three municipal halls (Dürwiß, Kinzweiler and Weisweiler), a cinema, a municipal art collection and the so-called Culture Centre Talbahnhof for cabaret and music events. Every summer the Eschweiler Music Festival EMF takes place. People go to the numerous pubs around the Market Place and in the old-town alley Schnellengasse.

=== Carnival ===
Eschweiler is a centre of Rhineland carnival. It has more than 20 active carnival clubs, and every Monday before Lent it hosts the third-longest carnival procession in Germany.

=== Culinary specialities ===
- Sauerbraten
- Potato fritters (Reibekuchen) with black bread, apple syrup, sugar beet syrup or stewed apples
- Blood sausage (Blutwurst) crude or fried
- Hemmel on Äed (i.e. Heaven and Earth) mashed potatoes with stewed apples and fried blood pudding or fried panhas
- Rice pies, apricot pies, pear pies ("Schwatze Flaam") – 20 cm in diameter; the pear pies, also called black pies, are traditionally served at funerals
- Horse and horse by-products

== Medical care ==
Eschweiler is home to the St. Antonius Hospital with 443 beds and 13 departments. Every year, there are some 15,000 in-patients and 25,000 out-patients. The Euregio Breast Centre is part of the hospital.

== Sports ==
Soccer, ice hockey, golf, open-air swimming pool, indoor swimming pool, horse sports, handball.

== Industry ==
Chemicals and goods are the main products. The Weisweiler power station, operated by RWE Power, is a lignite-fired power plant located within the town.

== Science ==
The lignite (brown coal) deposits in the region are former Miocene swamp forest dominated by Castanopsis, a type of chinkapin. Such plants do not occur naturally in Europe anymore. A type of fossil wood has been described from logs found in Eschweiler mines. It was named Castanoxylon eschweilerense in reference to the town; the name would translate as "Eschweiler chinkapin wood", as it probably belonged to Castanopsis but perhaps to some other genus of chinkapin.

== Transport ==
Eschweiler has six railway stations: Eschweiler Hauptbahnhof (central station), Eschweiler-Aue (from 2009), Eschweiler-West, Eschweiler-Talbahnhof, Eschweiler-Nothberg, Eschweiler-Weisweiler and Nothberg (till 2009). Eschweiler-St. Jöris is planned.

Eschweiler has two bus terminals and bus lines in every quarter and in its whole vicinity. Autobahn exits on the A 4 include Eschweiler-West, Eschweiler-Ost and Weisweiler. The city can be reached also by three exits on the A 44: Aldenhoven, Alsdorf and Broichweiden.

== Notable people ==
- Franz Reuleaux (1829–1905), mechanical engineer
- Wilhelm Lexis (1837–1914), economist, national economist and statistician
- August Thyssen (1842–1926), founded the Thyssen-Foussol & Co. in Duisburg in 1867, and later other steelworks. The company entered the ThyssenKrupp AG in 1997
- Joseph Thyssen (1844–1915), industrialist and the younger brother of August Thyssen
- Götz Briefs (1889–1974), national economist and social philosopher
- Gerhard Fieseler (1896–1987), pilot and aerobatics champion
- Heinrich Boere (1921–2013), German-Dutch war criminal
- Martin Stevens (born 1929), politician
- Theo Altmeyer (1931–2007), tenor
- Willibert Kauhsen (born 1939), racing driver
- József Ács (born 1948), composer, conductor, director of the Franz Liszt Society of Eschweiler
- Johannes Bündgens (born 1956), auxiliary bishop of Aachen
- Martin Schulz (born 1955), SPD politician, former Chairman of the Group of the Social Democratic Party of Europe in the European Parliament
- Karl-Heinz Smuda (born 1961), ghostwriter, editor and publisher in Berlin and Norfolk / Virginia (USA)
- Claus Killing-Günkel (born 1963), esperantologist
- Andreas Gielchen (born 1964), soccer player
- Ralf Souquet (born 1968), pool billiards player
- Michaela Schaffrath (born 1970), actress (also known as Gina Wild)
- Markus Daun (born 1980), soccer player
- Susanne Kasperczyk (born 1985), soccer player
- Sascha Klein (born 1985), diver
- Kevin Kratz (born 1987), footballer
- Anna Sorokin (born 1991), fraudster

== Twin towns – sister cities ==
Eschweiler is twinned with:

- Wattrelos, France (1975)
- Reigate and Banstead, England, United Kingdom (1985)
- Sulzbach-Rosenberg, Germany (2019)
