= Martin Bader =

Martin Bader may refer to:

- Martin Bader (ski mountaineer) (born 1985), Austrian ski mountaineer
- Martin Bader (soccer official) (born 1968), German soccer official
