= Blausteinsee =

Artificial lake in Germany

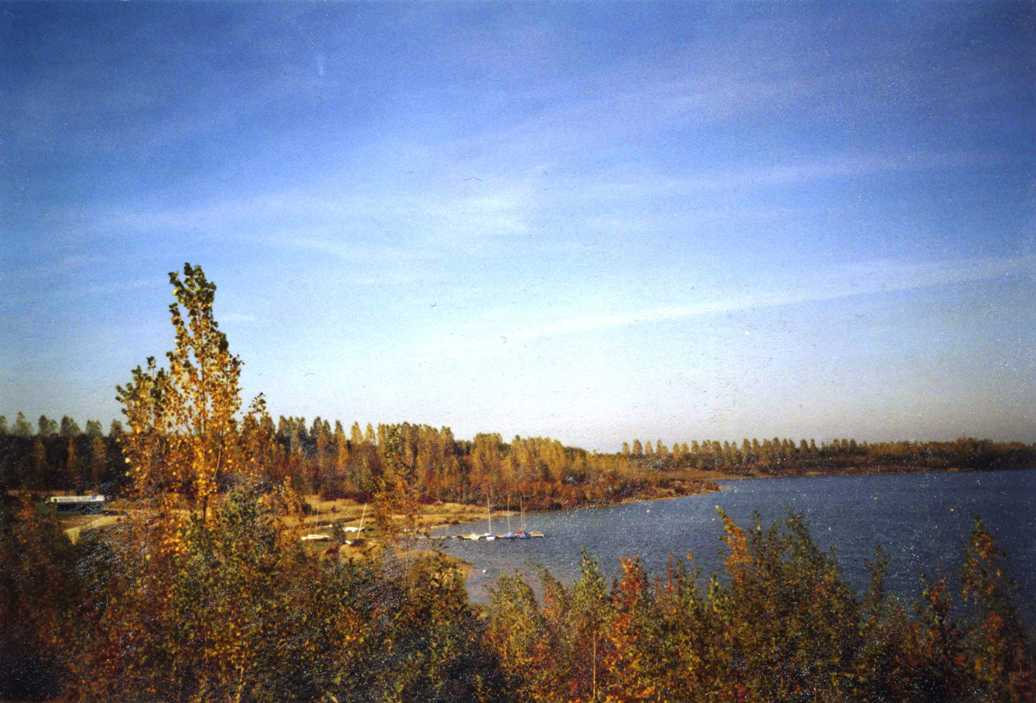
- Western shore of the lake

- Location within Germany
- Coordinates: 50°51′18″N 06°16′27″E
- Surface area: 1 km^{2} (0.39 sq mi)
- Average depth: 46 m (151 ft)
- Surface elevation: 129 m (423 ft)

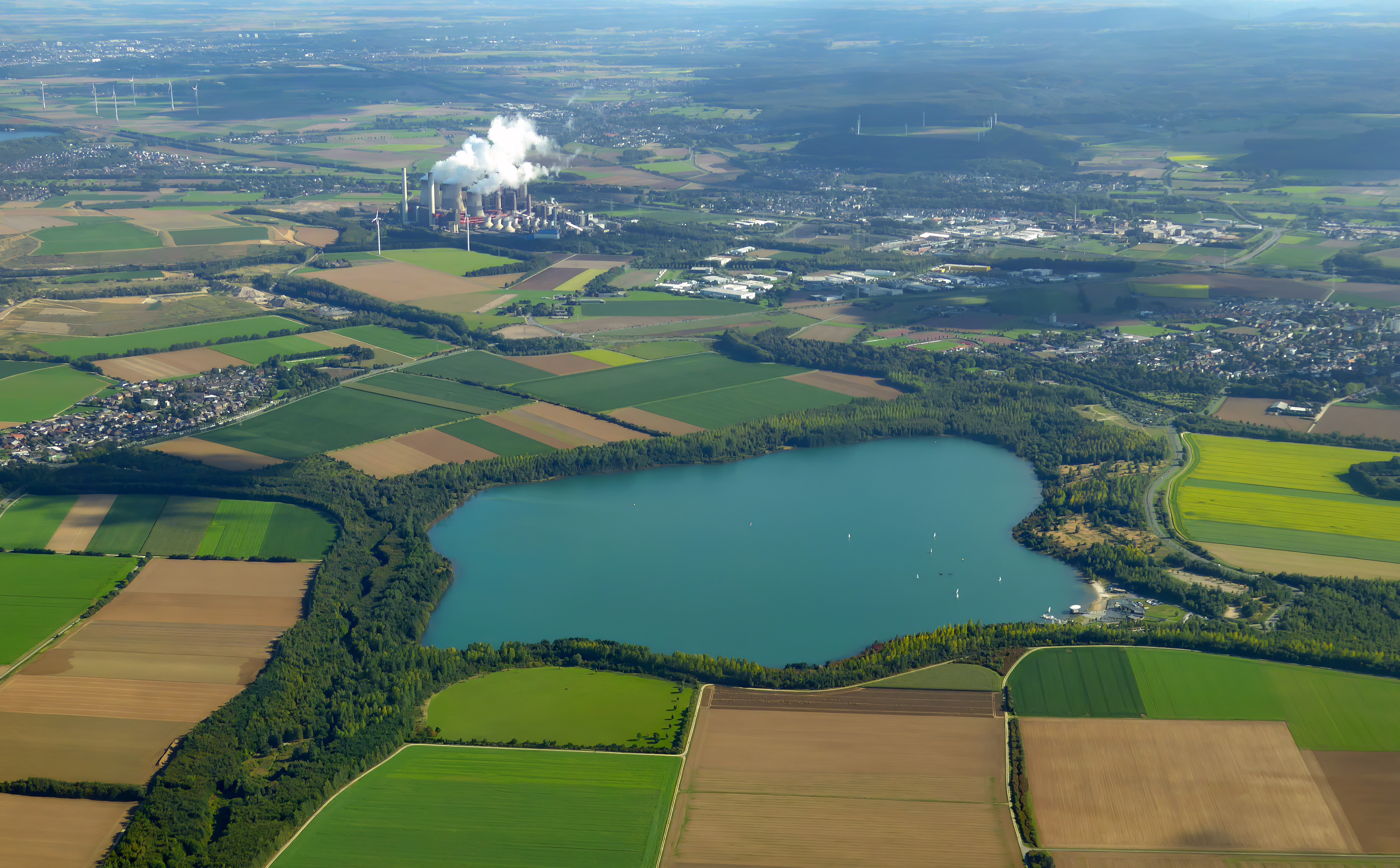
Blausteinsee, with the Weisweiler power station behind

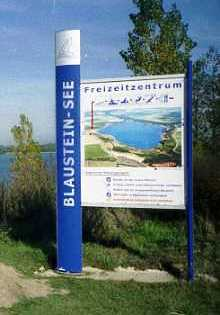
Information board

The Blausteinsee Leisure and Recreation Area is an artificial lake north of the Eschweiler municipality in the Aachen district of North Rhine-Westphalia, Germany. Its area is around 100 hectares and depth is 46m. It was created during the regeneration of the Zukunft opencast coal mine in the Rhineland coalfield, made by flooding the pit left by the mine with water. Today, the lake is a holiday area for the surrounding towns. The surface of the lake is 129 metres above sea level and its volume is around 25 million cubic metres. The filling of the lake began in 1994.

The owner of the Blausteinsee is the Blausteinsee Leisure Centre GmbH, which was founded as a support organization in 1982 by the municipalities of Aldenhoven, Alsdorf, Eschweiler, Stolberg and Würselen. The aim of this company is to create and maintain an attractive leisure and recreational area for the people of the Aachen region, along with coordination of activities on and around the lake.

== Location and detailed description ==
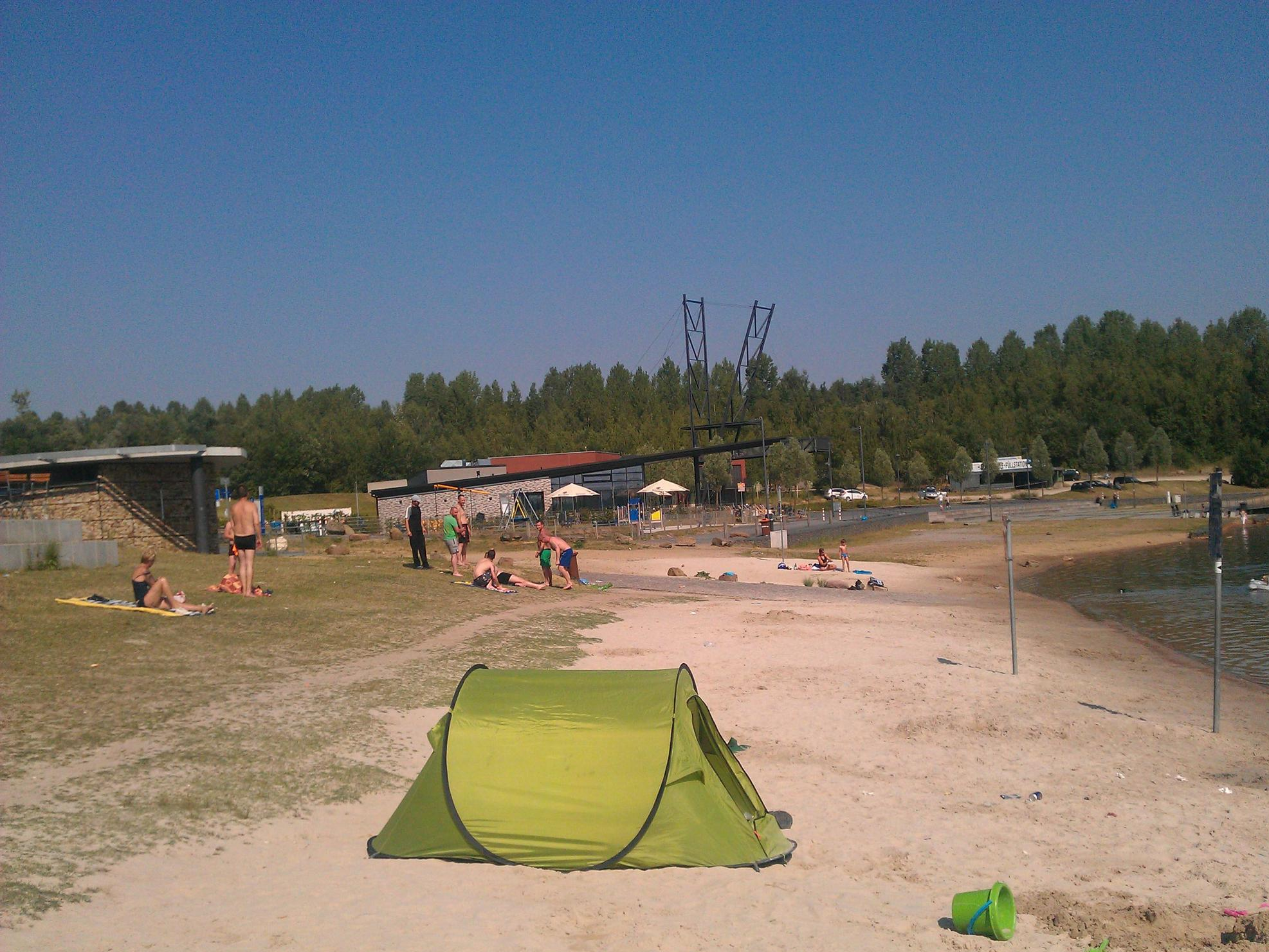
Beach

Blausteinsee is located primarily in the municipality of Eschweiler. The only exception is the Schlangengraben stream flowing to its north, which is part of the municipality of Aldenhoven. There is a recreational area on the southern shore located in the Dürwiß district which includes an outdoor swimming pool and a place for young people to ride their bikes. The twin districts of Fronhoven and Neu-Lohnn lie on the eastern shore. The lake is surrounded by a green belt, 80–130 metres wide, with a footpath, a cycle path and a 10.3 km long rollerblading path. Altogether, the lake's recreational area consists of about 180 hectares.

A diving area lies on the northwestern shore and includes a filling station and an aid for easy entry and exit. The western shoreline contains a bathing area and a beach, along with a dining area. The northern, northeastern and eastern shores are a natural reserve.

== History ==
In 1981, the town of Eschweiler started working on plans for a lake in the town (the Eschweiler Sea). The Eschweiler sailing club had already been formed two years previously. In 1982, the relocation of the population of Erberich, Langendorf, Laurenzburg, Lürken, Langweiler and Obermerz to the towns of Neu-Lohn and Fronhoven began. Blaustein GmbH was founded as a local supporting organisation by the towns of Aldenhoven, Alsdorf, Eschweiler and Würselen and the name of the lake was changed to Blausteinsee. This was the first inter-municipal project in the Aachen region.

The name of the lake comes from the old district of Am blauen Stein north of Dürwiß, a 17th or 18th-century wayside cross on the road between Dürwiß and Fronhoven, as it appears in old maps.

After the last of the 530 million tons of brown coal was mined from the Zukunft-West mine in 1987, regeneration began. In early 1994, the last machinery was removed from the mine. The former mines of Zukunft and Zukunft-West were around 23 km^{2}. At the same time the access road was renamed as Zum Blausteinsee.

On 5 October 1994 the filling of the Blausteinsee began. The fountain was in the middle of the lake, around 500m from the shore, using around 210 liters of water per second, and reaching a height of 40m. Around 6.7 million m³ of water flowed into the lake per year, and, to start off with at least, 75 million m³ were needed because up to 50 million m³ of water either sunk into the ground or evaporated.

In August 1997, the Verband der wassersporttreibenden Vereine Blausteinsee 1997 e. V. was founded. This was a follow-up to the Interessengemeinschaft Blausteinsee which was created in 1982. On 12 August 2000 the Blausteinsee was officially opened and a temporary container village was set up. In 2002, the Eschweiler sailing club and the Alsdorf sailing club constructed their own dock. Since August 2003 a private security company has been employed to patrol the area to prevent wild barbecuing, swimming and the trespassing of nature reserves. In August 2004 a part of the lake was made accessible for swimming and in 2005 the lake reached its final area of around 100 hectares and a maximum depth of 46m. A large erratic boulder on the western shore serves as a memorial to the initial filling and opening of the lake.

== Watersport ==
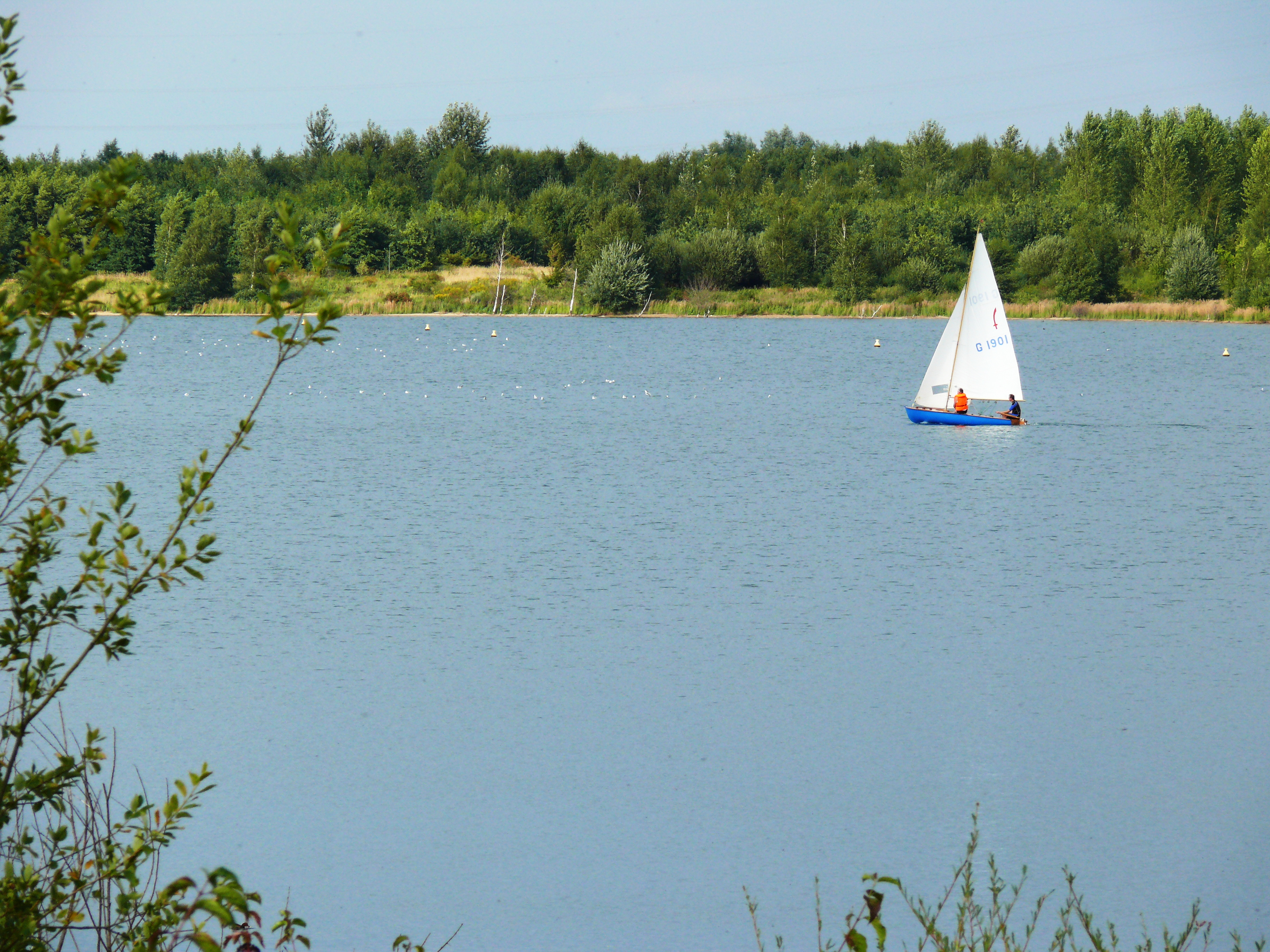
Sailing boat on the lake

The Blausteinsee very quickly developed into an attraction for sports enthusiasts. On the western shore, there is a diving area. Because of the sandy lakebed, the visibility depends on the number of divers but usually ranges between 1-7m. Below 25m the visibility is especially good. Many attractions have been sunk into the lake, such as a car, a wrecked dinghy, a statue of an angel and trees. The Eschweiler Diving Club has produced an underwater map showing them all. The lake is also used for canoeing, rowing, swimming, sailing and windsurfing; however, kitesurfing and model boats are prohibited.

Every year the Erich Berscheit Cup is contested by holding a regatta. It is named after the former mayor of Eschweiler, Erich Berscheit, who decided to create the lake.

=== Rules for visitors ===
Visitors are required to follow specific behaviors with regard to the lake:

- Dogs must remain tethered, so that they do not interfere with spawning and nesting sites on the shore.
- Grilling and lighting of shishas are prohibited. Especially in the summer months, the fire risk is very high.
- There is a strict ban on the feeding of birds for the protection of the animals.

== Flora and fauna ==
The Blausteinsee is still biologically young. Cnidarians, crabs, freshwater snails, amphibians and many fish, from small to medium-sized such as the common rudd, the common roach, perciforms and eels can be seen in the lake. Near the shore, the first water plants are starting to spread. The immediate surroundings of the lake are fields, trees, copses and hedges. The green belt, which is around 80-130m wide, is filled with deciduous trees, bushes, meadows and other areas that were allowed to develop naturally.

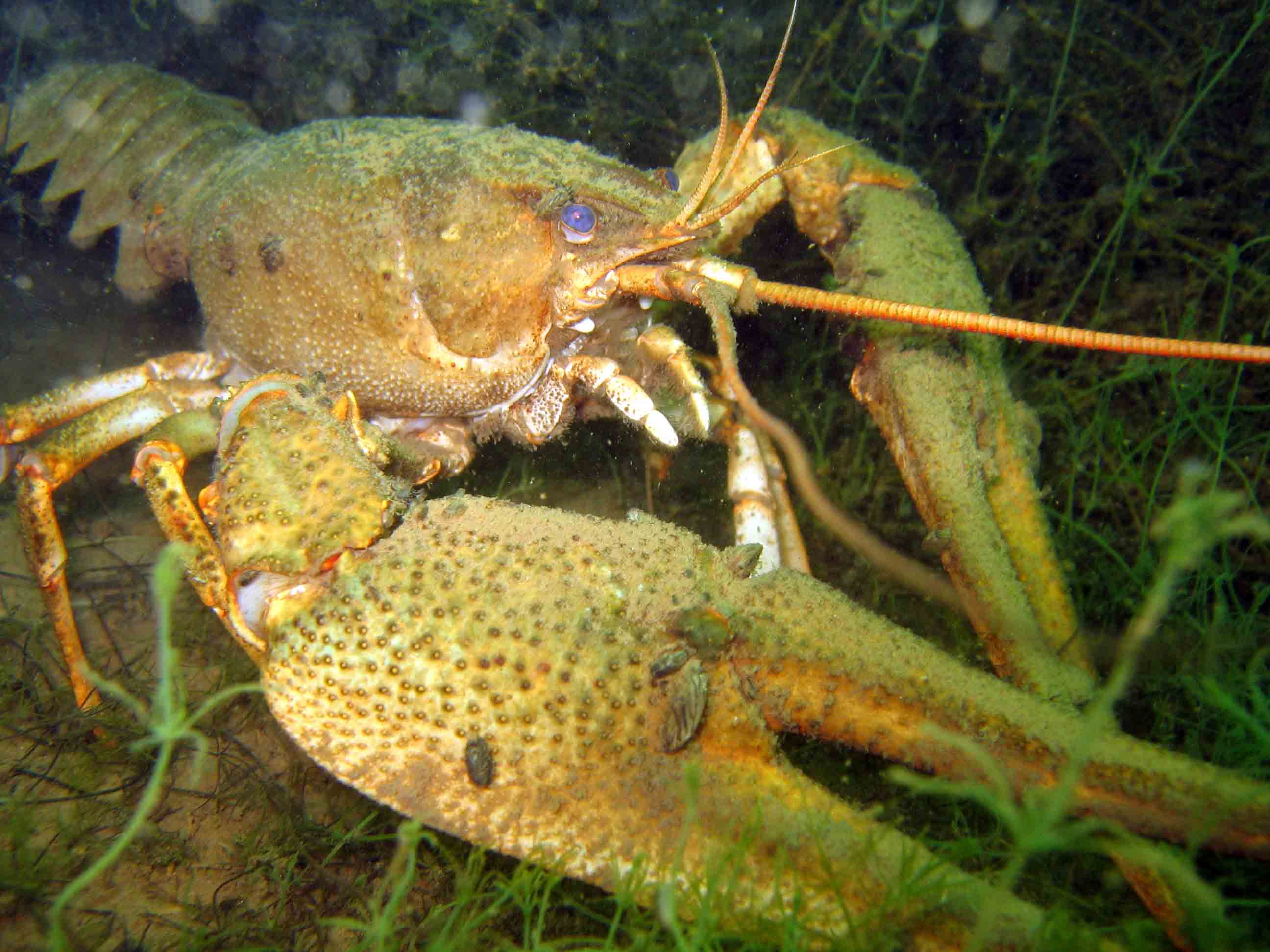
Crayfish

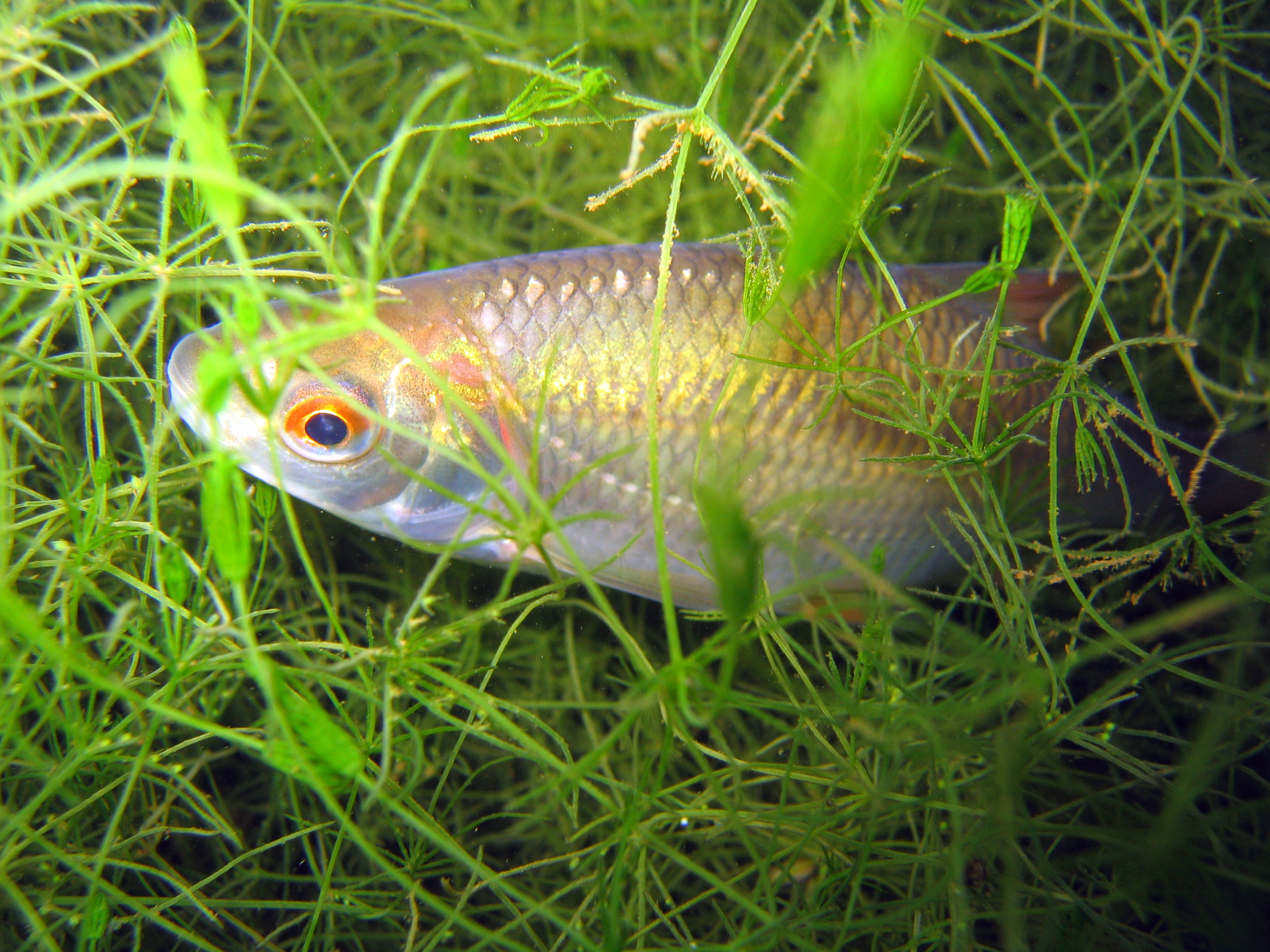
Roach

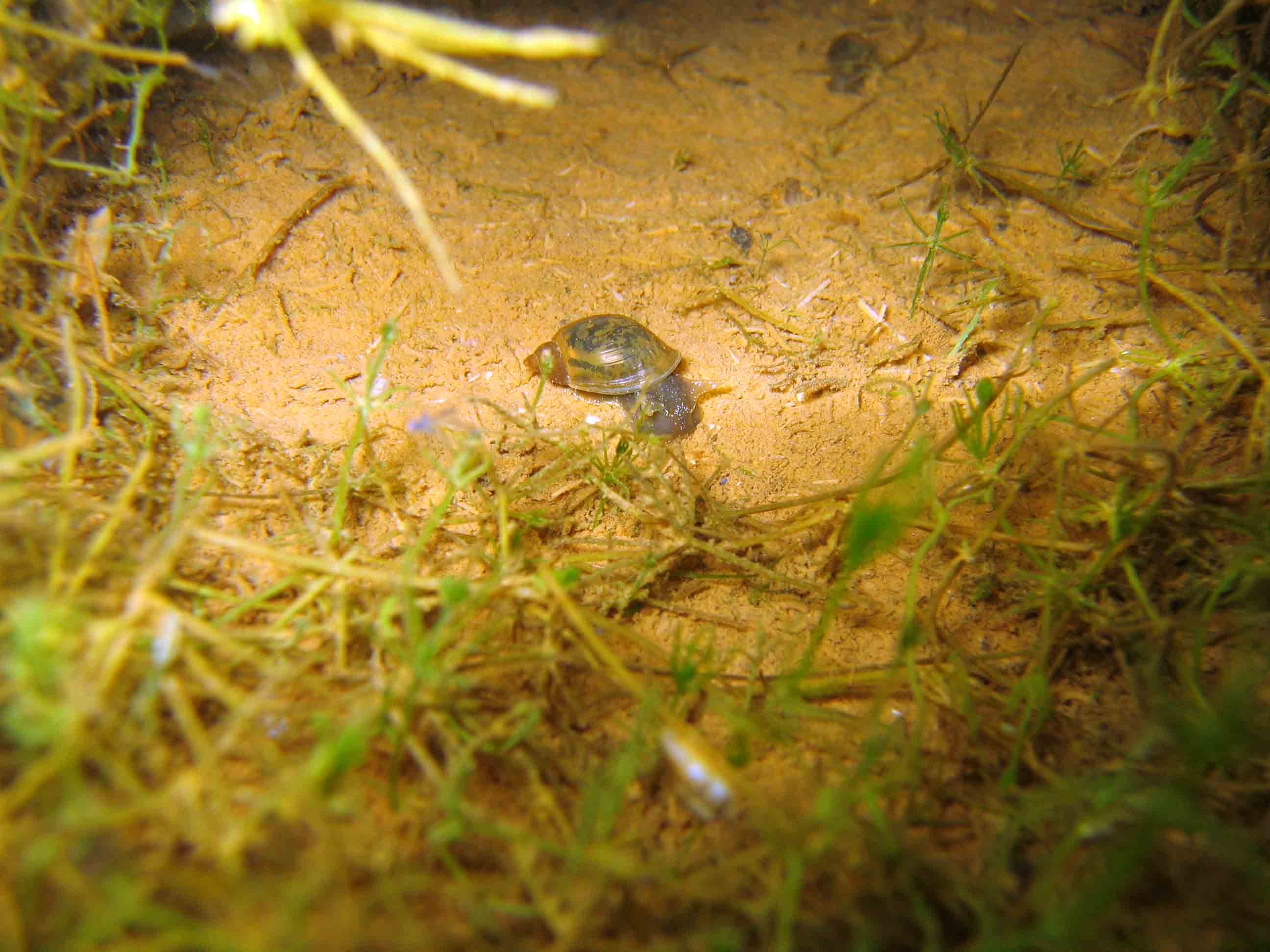
Water snail

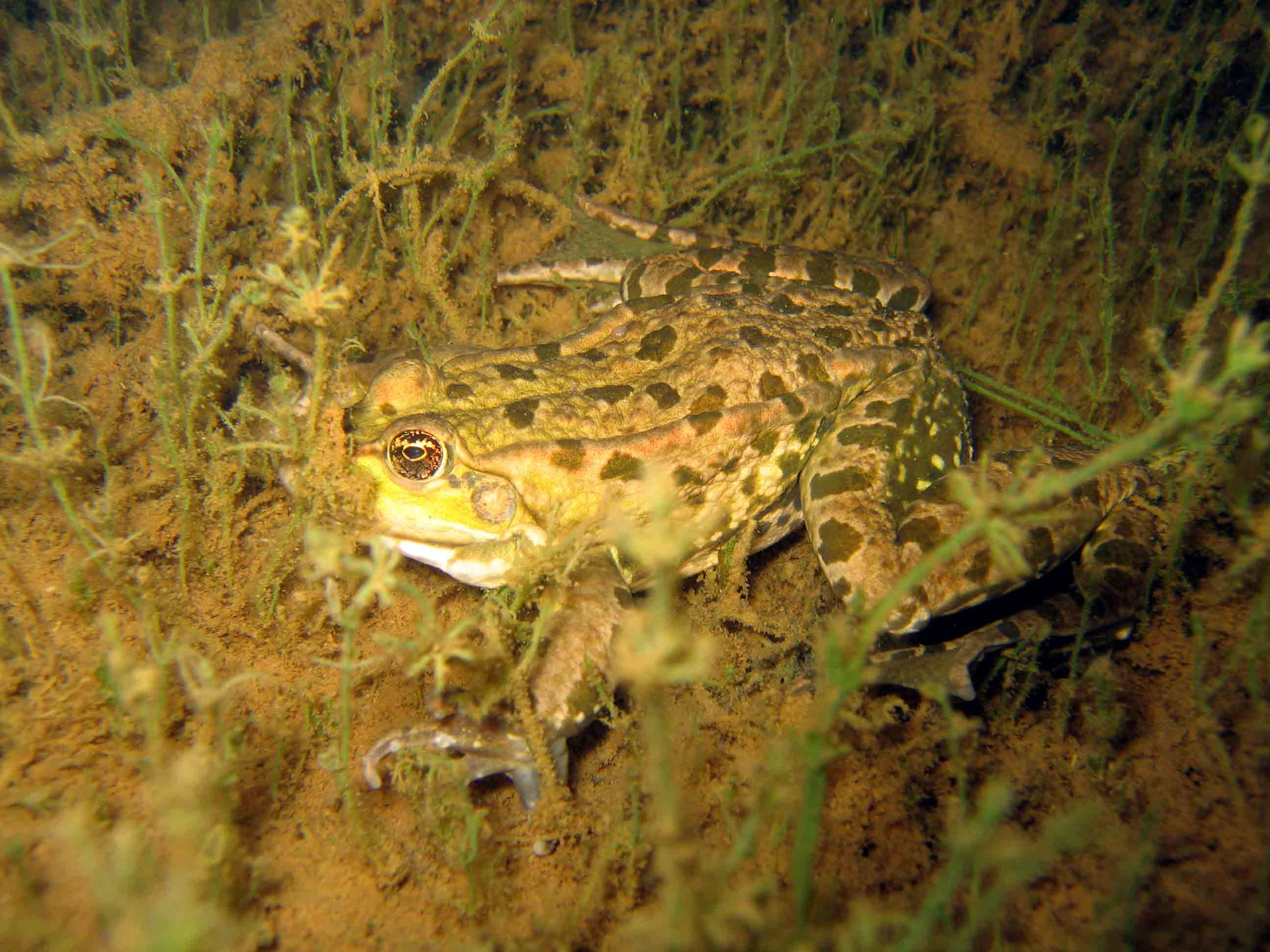
Marsh frog

== External reading and references ==
- Peter Bailly, Franz Josef Holzapfel: Eschweiler entdecken. Die Wanderwege des Eifelvereins Eschweiler mit Beschreibung der heimatkundlichen Sehenswürdigkeiten. Eifelverein Eschweiler, Düren 2002, ISBN 3-921805-24-4.
- Bezirksregierung Münster als Obere Flurbereinigungsbehörde in Zusammenarbeit mit dem Amt für Agrarordnung Euskirchen: Historischer Pfad rund um den Blausteinsee (Erinnerungen an die Orte Lürken, Laurenzberg, Langweiler, Obermerz und Langendorf). Broschüre.
- Leo Braun: Der Blausteinsee. Woher kommt der Name Blausteinsee? In: Schriftenreihe des Eschweiler Geschichtsvereins. Bd. 21, 2001, ISSN 0724-7745, S. 8–14.
- Adam Elsen: Geschichte der Stadt Eschweiler in Daten. (1800 bis 1993) (= Schriftenreihe des Eschweiler Geschichtsvereins. Bd. 14). Eschweiler Geschichtsverein, Eschweiler 1993.
- Christiane Krahn: Die bandkeramischen Siedlungen im oberen Schlangengrabental. Studien zur bandkeramischen Besiedlung der Aldenhovener Platte (= Rheinische Ausgrabungen 57). von Zabern, Mainz 2006, ISBN 3-8053-3658-6.
