= Karl-Heinz Smuda =

German journalist

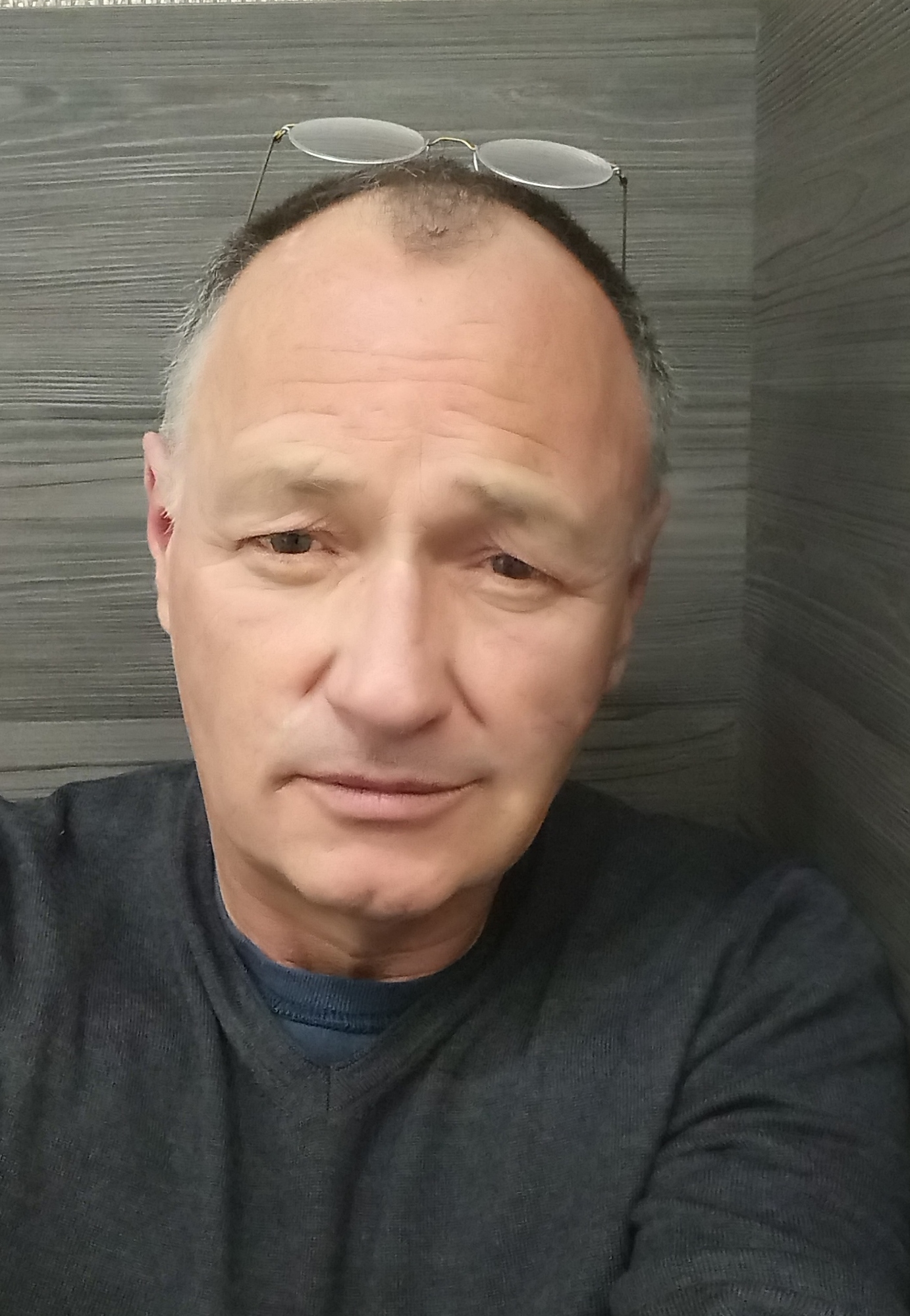
Smuda in 2019

Karl-Heinz Smuda (born 24 January 1961 in Eschweiler) is a German radio journalist, media-expert, ghostwriter and major in the German Air Force. He was speaker of the NATO detachment in Siauliai and the German detachment of EUFOR RD Congo in Kinshasa/ DR Congo.

== Radio career ==
Smuda was a correspondent for Deutschlandradio, Germany's national radio public broadcast system, and head of a radio station in the former East German country of Brandenburg. After the fall of the Berlin Wall, he worked as a reporter in Leipzig, and became known for his reports on the lives of the citizens of East Germany. For the past 30 years, Smuda has worked for various radio stations in Germany, as well as making a series of broadcasts from the United States concerning politics and culture in the Oregon, New York, Massachusetts, California and North Carolina. He worked as an editor in the German department of Radio Vatican in 1980 and 1981. Smuda has made 12000 reports from Germany and all over the world. He is a lecturer at the University of Wuppertal and Cottbus, trainer in the academy for communication and information of German Air Force in Strauberg, near Berlin.

== Background ==
Smuda received a scholarship for his work in children's television in Manila. He worked as a reporter in the crisis areas of East Timor and Kosovo. He has studied social science. He currently resides in Wilmersdorf area of West-Berlin. Smuda has also worked as a speaker for the German detachment of NATO Baltic Air Policing in Šiauliai in Lithuania. Afterwards, he worked in the Operation Headquarter of EU in Potsdam for preparation Europe's engagement during the election in the Democratic Republic Congo (PR) and was Press Information Officer (PIO/ Major OF3) in Kinshasa. He was chief-editor of the newspaper "ECHO" during the multinational exercise ELITE 2006 for 16 countries.
