= Bernd Hoffmann =

German football executive

Bernd Paul Hoffmann (born 21 January 1963, Leverkusen) is a German sports official and was Chairman of 2. Bundesliga club Hamburger SV from 2003 to 2011 and from 2018 to 2020.

== Life ==
Hoffman studied at the University of Cologne and in Pennsylvania, where he graduated in 1989 with a master's degree in Business Administration. He then worked for the sports marketer UFA Sports and later at Sportfive for the marketing of some football clubs in the new federal states. In 1998, UFA Sports also took over the marketing of Hamburger SV.

On 16 December 2002, Hoffmanns commitment to HSV was announced. On 1 February 2003 Hoffman was elected to the role of chief executive of HSV with an initial four year contract; this contract was extended in December 2007 to December 2011. In March 2011, Hoffmann did not receive the necessary two-thirds majority with a vote of 7:5. Hoffmann's contract, which expires at the end of 2011, would not be extended. In March 2011, HSV announced that they had separated from Bernd Hoffmann effective immediately.

From January 2013 to January 2018, Hoffmann was managing partner of the player consulting agency Lanista Sports Management GmbH.

He was elected to the office of President of the club on 18 February 2018 with 51.1% of the votes, making him a natural member of the supervisory board of HSV Fußball AG, into which the licensed player department has been spun off since 2014. On 27 February 2018, he was elected deputy chairman of the supervisory board, before taking over as chairman of the board on 7 March.

Hoffmann is divorced, has four children (twice twins) and lives with his girlfriend Sandra Henke in Hamburg.
