= Ludwig Hinterstocker =

German footballer (1931–2020)

Personal information
- Full name: Ludwig Hinterstocker
- Date of birth: 1 April 1931
- Place of birth: Traunstein, Germany
- Date of death: 2 July 2020 (aged 89)
- Position: Forward

Senior career*
Years	Team	Apps	(Gls)
1953–1958	VfB Stuttgart		
1958–1964	Stuttgarter Kickers		

International career
1952	West Germany Olympic	2	(0)
- * Club domestic league appearances and goals

Ludwig Hinterstocker (11 April 1931 – 2 July 2020) was a German former footballer who competed in the 1952 Summer Olympics.
