= Karlheinz =

Karlheinz is a German given name, composed of Karl and Heinz. Notable people with that name include:

- Karlheinz Böhm (1928–2014), Austrian actor
- Karlheinz Brandenburg (born 1954), audio engineer
- Karlheinz Deschner (1924–2014), German agnostic
- Karlheinz Essl (born 1960), Austrian composer, performer, sound artist, improviser and composition teacher
- Karlheinz Förster (born 1958), former German football player
- Karlheinz Geils (born 1955), German football player
- Karlheinz Hackl (1949–2014), Austrian actor
- Karlheinz Kaske (1928–1998), German manager and CEO of the Siemens AG
- Karlheinz Klotz (born 1950), West German athlete
- Karlheinz Martin (1886–1948), German stage and film director
- Karlheinz Oswald (born 1958), German sculptor
- Karlheinz Pflipsen (born 1970), retired German soccer player
- Karlheinz Schreiber (born 1934), German-born lobbyist, fundraiser, arms dealer and businessman
- Karlheinz Stockhausen (1928–2007), German composer
- Karlheinz Zöller (1928–2005), German flutist

== See also ==
- Karl-Heinz
