= József Ács (musician) =

German composer and classical pianist of Hungarian origin

József Ács (born 1948) is a German composer, and classical pianist and composer of Hungarian origin. He is a graduate of the Franz Liszt Academy of Music in Budapest and the Robert Schumann Hochschule in Düsseldorf, he won the first prize for piano at the "German Music Competition" in the Beethovenhalle in Bonn. He is particularly renowned for his recitals of Franz Liszt, and has done work in conjunction with the Vatican Archives. More recently he has been performing the works of Italian composer Ruggero Leoncavallo. He composed a completion of Leoncavallo's Requiem which was a fragment. Ács also wrote a small mass for choir and organ called, "Weihnachtslieder-Messe." Appropriate for the Christmas season, this joyful mass incorporates two Christmas tunes, In dulci jubilo, and Es kommt ein Schiff geladen.
