= Martin Bader (soccer official) =

German soccer official

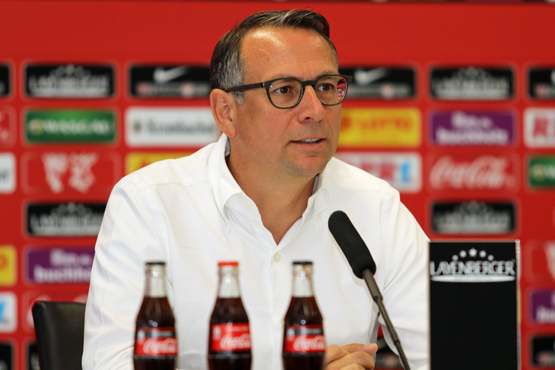
Martin Bader (2019)

Martin Bader (born 14 February 1968 in Hechingen) is a German soccer official. Recently he has been a managing director and sporting director at Alemannia Aachen until December 2021.

== Life ==
After graduating from high school, Bader was drafted for two years in the armed forces (Bundeswehr), where he trained as a reserve officer. He then took a degree in Sports economics at the University of Bayreuth, where he completed a diploma. The subject of this diploma thesis from 1995 was "The DFB jurisdiction – illustrated by the licensing procedure for licensed clubs in football using Hertha BSC as an example". From 1994 to 1998 he held various positions at UFA Sports (now Lagardère Sports and Entertainment). In 1998 he moved to Hertha BSC as assistant to the sports management team. In 2002 he was promoted to head of the football department.

== Career as soccer official ==
=== 1. FC Nürnberg ===
On 12 November 2003 Bader signed a contract with 1. FC Nürnberg. From 1 January 2004 he was sports director and full-time vice president there. From July 2010 he was also assisted by Christian Möckel as chief scout. From October 2010 to September 2015, he was one of the club boards and was responsible for sports and public relations. During Bader's tenure, the club won the DFB-Pokal in 2007.

=== Hannover 96 ===
On 1 October 2015, Martin Bader was appointed managing director of the sports department by the club's president and at the time sole managing director of Hannover 96, Martin Kind. Thereby he indirectly became the successor of sports director Dirk Dufner, with Christian Möckel also succeeding him as the new Directeur sportif. In March 2017 Hannover 96 released him and Möckel from their labour law obligations.

=== 1. FC Kaiserslautern ===
At the end of January 2018, Bader became the sports director of the 2. Bundesliga club 1. FC Kaiserslautern, who was threatened with relegation. At the end of the 2017–18 2. Bundesliga, the club was relegated to the 3. Liga. Before the 2018–19 3. Liga, the licensed players department was spun off from the registered club into a GmbH & Co. KGaA, in which Bader took over the position of sports director. His contract with 1. FC Kaiserslautern, which expired on 31 December 2019 was not extended, which is why he left the club at the end of the year. On 3 December, he and commercial director Michael Klatt, were replaced by Soeren Oliver Voigt.

=== Alemannia Aachen ===
On 1 March 2021, Martin Bader took over the management and sporting direction at Alemannia Aachen, where he was dismissed on 15 December after just nine and a half months.
