= UFA Sports =

U! Sports GmbH
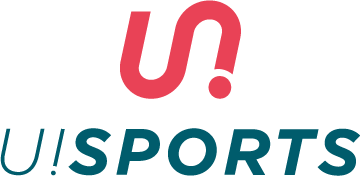
- Headquarters: Hamburg, Germany
- Website: http://www.usports.de/

U! Sports (formerly UFA Sports GmbH) is an internationally active sports marketing agency. Its main sphere of activity includes the distribution of media, sponsorship, corporate hospitality and testimonial rights as well as traditional sports marketing consultancy services. The agency's portfolio comprises a wide range of cooperations in several different sports and with different institutions such as confederations, federations, leagues, clubs and athletes. These cooperations include inter alia long-term partnerships with the German Bundesliga clubs FC St. Pauli, 1. FC Union Berlin and FC Ingolstadt 04 as well as with the boxer and current WBA Middleweight Super Champion Felix Sturm.

== History ==
The history of the UFA Sports brand goes back to 1988 when the UFA Film- und Fernseh GmbH, a subsidiary of Bertelsmann, signed the first ever private television broadcast right contract with the German Football League and moreover acquired the television rights of the Wimbledon tennis tournament, the same year – two revolutionary deals in the German media landscape at that time. In 1994, UFA Sports successfully invested in the rehabilitation of the football club Hertha BSC Berlin and thereby laid the foundation for the first ever general marketing agreement with a Bundesliga Club. Seven years later, UFA Sports underwent several mergers and acquisitions, among others with the two French sport rights agencies Sport+ and GJCD 2000, and was renamed into Sportfive. In 2008, UFA Sports was re-established under the roof of its original shareholders the RTL Group and Bertelsmann and is now led by several former Sportfive managers with the headquarters of the agency based in Hamburg. In May 2015, Lagardère Unlimited, the dedicated Sports and Entertainment branch of the French media Company Lagardère Group, acquired the agency. As a result of this connection, a 2-brand-strategy has been adopted, in which both of the agencies operate individually and independently within the market and consequently represent their respective objectives and needs of their rights holders and sponsors. From August 2016, UFA Sports is renamed as U! Sports.
