= Karl-Heinz Schönfelder =

German historian (1923–2018)

Karl-Heinz Schönfelder (26 April 1923 – 29 December 2018) was a German historian of modern literature and the founder of American studies at the University of Leipzig.

== Biography ==
During World War II Schönfelder had been a prisoner of war in American captivity. Since 1948, he had a teaching practice for dealing in American English at Karl Marx University in Leipzig. In 1950 he earned his Ph.D degree with a dissertation on Sinclair Lewis as a social and cultural critic. From 1953 he also gave lectures about the history of the United States. 1954 he earned his habilitation about international problems regarding the mixing of peoples and languages including the aspects of German words feud heritage in American English.

Together with his assistant Eberhard Brüning from 1955 Schönfelder headed the Department of American Studies at the Institute of Anglistic and American Studies. Even after his appointment at Jena (1956–1963) Schönfelder stood a visiting scholar at Leipzig. Schönfelder always tried to highlight the "socialist" side of American literature, for example in 19th century works. He also wrote numerous pre-and postscripts for translations of American literature, for example to several works of Mark Twain or Ernest Hemingway.

Schönfelder died on 29 December 2018, at the age of 95.
