= Alfred Steinkirchner =

German footballer

Personal information
- Date of birth: 23 October 1956
- Place of birth: Straubing, Germany
- Position: Forward

Senior career*
Years	Team	Apps	(Gls)
1974–1977	TSV Straubing		
1977–1978	1. FC Nürnberg	7	(1)
1978–1979	→ SC Freiburg (loan)	20	(0)
1979–1980	1. FC Nürnberg	14	(0)
1980–1982	Stuttgarter Kickers	56	(12)
1982–1984	TSV Straubing		
1984–1985	Jahn Regensburg		

Managerial career
- 1994–1994: TSV Straubing
- * Club domestic league appearances and goals

Alfred Steinkirchner (born 23 October 1956) is a German former professional footballer who played as a forward.
