= Andreas Merkle =

West German footballer

Personal information
- Date of birth: 17 April 1962 (age 64)
- Place of birth: Stetten ob Lontal
- Height: 1.85 m (6 ft 1 in)
- Position: Forward

Senior career*
Years	Team	Apps	(Gls)
1981–1986	Stuttgarter Kickers		
1986–1988	VfB Stuttgart		
1988–1990	Hamburger SV		

International career
- West Germany u-21
- * Club domestic league appearances and goals

Andreas Merkle (born 17 April 1962) is a retired West German football striker.
