= 2013–14 Stuttgarter Kickers season =

Stuttgarter Kickers
2013–14 season
- Chairman: Rainer Lorz
- Manager: Massimo Morales (until Sep.); Jürgen Hartmann (Sep.); Horst Steffen (since Sep.)
- Stadium: Gazi-Stadion auf der Waldau, Stuttgart, BW
- 3. Liga: 8th
- Württemberg Cup: Runners-Up
- Top goalscorer: League: Vincenzo Marchese (12); All: Vincenzo Marchese (12)
- Highest home attendance: 6,360 vs. 1. FC Heidenheim, 1 March 2014
- Lowest home attendance: 2,670 vs. SV Wehen Wiesbaden, 14 December 2013
Home colours	Away colours

The 2013–14 Stuttgarter Kickers season is the 114th season in the club's football history. In 2013–14 the club plays in the 3. Liga, the third tier of German football. It is the club's second season back in this league, having been promoted from the Regionalliga in 2012. The club also takes part in the 2013–14 edition of the Württemberg Cup.

== Matches ==
=== Legend ===
Win Draw Loss Postponed

=== Friendly matches ===
Date	Time	Stadium	City	Opponent	Result	Attendance	Goalscorers and carded players		Source
Date	Time	Stadium	City	Opponent	Result	Attendance	Stuttgarter Kickers	Opponent	Source
Pre–season friendlies
19 June 2013	18:00	Hörgeräte-Langer-Stadion	Ingolstadt, Germany	FC Ingolstadt 04	0–2	400	—	Caiuby 5'; Schäffler 37'	
23 June 2013	15:00	Sporpark Brühl	Rutesheim, Germany	SKV Rutesheim	2–1	700	Baumgärtel 38'; Akin 75'	Eberhardt 62'	
26 June 2013	18:00	Sportanlage im Wertweg	Stuttgart, Germany	SKG Max-Eyth-See Stuttgart	10–0	700	Ivanusa 16' 50'; Auracher 23' (pen.); Savranlıoğlu 25'; Baumgärtel 33'; Grischok 35'; Dicklhuber 55' 86'; Stein 75'; Alvarez 84'	—	
29 June 2013	16:00	Stadion an der Sigamringer Straße	Hettingen, Germany	SC Pfullendorf	0–0	300	—	—	
30 June 2013	14:00	Ricotenplatz	Ammerbuch, Germany	TGV Entringen	10–0	700	Akin 2' 53'; Gaiser 11'; Heim 39'; Savranlıoğlu 40' 42'; Alvarez 59'	—	
6 July 2013	18:00	Gazi-Stadion auf der Waldau	Stuttgart, Germany	VfB Stuttgart	0–2	5,800	—	Ibišević 55' 62'	
10 July 2013	17:30	ADM-Sportpark	Stuttgart, Germany	VfR Aalen	0–1		—	Klauß 31'	
Mid–season friendlies
13 August 2013	18:30	Hauptplatz Boll	Bad Boll, Germany	TSV Bad Boll	1–0	300	Baumgärtel 38'	—	
15 October 2013	18:00	Elzstadion	Mosbach, Germany	SpVgg Neckarelz	3–0	100	Baumgärtel 9'; Soriano 22'; Edwini-Bonsu 70'	—	
15 November 2013	18:30	comtech Arena	Aspach, Germany	Sonnenhof Großaspach	2-1	250	Dicklhuber 39', 64'	Skarlatidis 51'	
11 January 2014	16:00	Side Star Sports Complex	Side, Turkey	Jong PSV Eindhoven	3-1		Marchese 67' (pen.); Leutenecker 71'; Soriano 73'	Boljević 77'	
13 January 2014	16:00	Side Star Sports Complex	Side, Turkey	Fortuna Düsseldorf II	5-2		Calamita 17'; Braun 27'; Ivanusa 55'; Miftari 59'; Dicklhuber 86' (pen.)	Golley 42'; Urban 57'	
18 January 2014	14:00	Ruhbank Arena	Pirmasens, Germany	FK Pirmasens	2-0	100	Badiane 31'; Ivan 73'	—	
21 January 2014	17:00	Seppl-Herberger-Stadion	Mannheim, Germany	SV Waldhof Mannheim	3-1	120	Miftari 7', 42'; Ivan 23'	Sökler 56'	

=== 3. Liga ===
==== League fixtures and results ====
Match	Date	Time	Stadium	City	Opponent	Result	Attendance	Goalscorers		Table		Source
Match	Date	Time	Stadium	City	Opponent	Result	Attendance	Stuttgarter Kickers	Opponent	Pos.	Pts	Source
1	20 July 2013	14:00	Gazi-Stadion auf der Waldau	Stuttgart	Rot-Weiß Erfurt	0-1	3,860	—	Pfingsten-Reddig 85' (pen.)	15	0	
2	27 July 2013	14:00	BRITA-Arena	Wiesbaden	SV Wehen Wiesbaden	0-4	2,763	—	Jänicke 10'; Mintzel 21'; Wiemann 63'; Vunguidica 81'	19	0	
3	10 August 2013	14:00	Gazi-Stadion auf der Waldau	Stuttgart	Holstein Kiel	1-1	3,600	Dicklhuber 90'	Gebers 90+2'	18	1	
4	16 August 2013	19:00	Ludwigsparkstadion	Saarbrücken	SV Elversberg 07	1-1	600	Alvarez 12'	Vaccaro 81' (pen.)	18	2	
5	25 August 2013	14:00	Gazi-Stadion auf der Waldau	Stuttgart	VfB Stuttgart II	0-2	4,470	—	Wanitzek 9'; Riemann 87'	19	2	
6	31 August 2013	14:00	Osnatel-Arena	Osnabrück	VfL Osnabrück	2-2	8,098	Alvarez 65', 69'	Hohnstedt 15'; Dercho 90+3'	19	3	
7	3 September 2013	19:00	Gazi-Stadion auf der Waldau	Stuttgart	SpVgg Unterhaching	2-3	3,270	Dicklhuber 20'; Soriano 65'	Steinherr 19'; Bichler 22'; Moll 83'	19	3	
8	7 September 2013	14:00	Voith-Arena	Heidenheim	1. FC Heidenheim	0-2	8,400	—	Sökler 51'; Schnatterer 59'	19	3	
9	14 September 2013	14:00	Gazi-Stadion auf der Waldau	Stuttgart	SSV Jahn Regensburg	3-0	3,200	Braun 35'; Soriano 62'; Leutenecker 70'	—	18	6	
10	21 September 2013	14:00	Stadion an der Gellertstraße	Chemnitz	Chemnitzer FC	0-1	4,146	—	Garbuschewski 84'	18	6	
11	28 September 2013	14:00	Gazi-Stadion auf der Waldau	Stuttgart	Borussia Dortmund II	3-0	3,310	Marchese 15' (pen.) 74' (pen.); Kefkir 48' (o.g.)	—	18	9	
12	5 October 2013	14:00	Stadion am Böllenfalltor	Darmstadt	SV Darmstadt 98	0-1	5,400	—	Stroh-Engel 36'	18	9	
13	19 October 2013	14:00	Gazi-Stadion auf der Waldau	Stuttgart	F.C. Hansa Rostock	2-0	4,610	Marchese 31' (pen.) 51' (pen.)	—	18	12	
14	26 October 2013	14:00	Ludwigsparkstadion	Saarbrücken	1. FC Saarbrücken	2-3	4,205	Alvarez 3'; Soriano 34'	Ziemer 24'; Leist 27' (o.g.); Hoffmann 58'	18	12	
15	2 November 2013	14:00	Schauinsland-Reisen-Arena	Duisburg	MSV Duisburg	1-1	12,019	Soriano 83'	Ofosu-Ayeh 88'	18	13	
16	9 November 2013	14:00	Gazi-Stadion auf der Waldau	Stuttgart	Hallescher FC	1-0	4,150	Soriano 55'	—	18	16	
17	23 November 2013	14:00	Preußenstadion	Münster	SC Preußen Münster	0-1	6,695	—	Taylor 72'	18	16	
18	30 November 2013	14:00	Gazi-Stadion auf der Waldau	Stuttgart	Wacker Burghausen	3-1	3,100	Baumgärtel 14'; Badiane 82'; Marchese 90'	Burkhard 56' (pen.)	18	19	
19	7 December 2013	14:00	Red Bull Arena	Leipzig	RB Leipzig	1-2	7,021	Marchese 38'	Thomalla 21'; Luge 50'	18	19	
20	14 December 2013	14:00	Gazi-Stadion auf der Waldau	Stuttgart	SV Wehen Wiesbaden	2-0	2,670	Marchese 35' (pen.); Soriano 39'	—	18	22	
21	21 December 2013	14:00	Steigerwaldstadion	Erfurt	Rot-Weiß Erfurt	2-1	5,709	Calamita 4'; Marchese 90+2' (pen.)	Nietfeld 36'	15	25	
22	25 January 2014	14:00	Holstein-Stadion	Kiel	Holstein Kiel	0-0	3,931	—	—	16	26	
23	1 February 2014	14:00	Gazi-Stadion auf der Waldau	Stuttgart	SV Elversberg 07	2-1	3,330	Badiane 33'; Fennell 87'	Luz 46'	13	29	
24	9 February 2014	15:30	Gazi-Stadion auf der Waldau	Stuttgart	VfB Stuttgart II	1-0	3,900	Calamita 47'	—	10	32	
25	15 February 2014	14:00	Gazi-Stadion auf der Waldau	Stuttgart	VfL Osnabrück	1-0	3,450	Badiane 4'	—	8	35	
26	22 February 2014	14:00	Sportpark Unterhaching	Unterhaching	SpVgg Unterhaching	2-2	1,700	Badiane 18'; Baumgärtel 80'	Haberer 72' (pen.); Duhnke 77'	7	36	
27	1 March 2014	14:00	Gazi-Stadion auf der Waldau	Stuttgart	1. FC Heidenheim	3-3	6,360	Soriano 10'; Leutenecker 47'; Marchese 52'	Göhlert 57'; Niederlechner 58'; Thurk 67'	7	37	
28	8 March 2014	14:00	Jahnstadion	Regensburg	SSV Jahn Regensburg	1-0	3,536	Edwini-Bonsu 90'	—	6	40	
29	15 March 2014	14:00	Gazi-Stadion auf der Waldau	Stuttgart	Chemnitzer FC	0-3	3,830	—	Kegel 15'; Garbuschewski 25'; Fink 85'	8	40	
30	21 March 2014	18:00	Stadion Rote Erde	Borussia Dortmund II	Dortmund	1-1	1,658	Marchese 69'	Thiele 84'	8	41	
31	25 March 2014	19:00	Gazi-Stadion auf der Waldau	Stuttgart	SV Darmstadt 98	0-0	4,300	—	—	11	42	
32	29 March 2014	14:00	DKB-Arena	Rostock	F.C. Hansa Rostock	2-2	6,200	Edwini-Bonsu 47'; Müller 60'	Jakobs 2'; Ioannidis 40'	10	43	
33	4 April 2014	19:00	Gazi-Stadion auf der Waldau	Stuttgart	1. FC Saarbrücken	1-0	4,050	Calamita 90'	—	7	46	
34	12 April 2014	14:00	Gazi-Stadion auf der Waldau	Stuttgart	MSV Duisburg	2-0	4,150	Marchese 32' (pen.); Braun 83'	—	5	49	
35	19 April 2014	14:00	Erdgas Sportpark	Halle	Hallescher FC	1-1	11,018	Marchese 25' (pen.)	Merkel 90'	7	50	
36	26 April 2014	14	Gazi-Stadion auf der Waldau	Stuttgart	SC Preußen Münster	1-1	3,910	Calamita 54'	Benyamina 8'	7	51	
37	3 May 2014	14:00	Wacker-Arena	Burghausen	Wacker Burghausen	0-2	1,730	—	Burkhard 40'; Kulabas 56'	7	51	
38	10 May 2014	14:00	Gazi-Stadion auf der Waldau	Stuttgart	RB Leipzig	1-3	5,800	Badiane 90'	Röttger 35'; Poulsen 41', 67'	8	51	

==== Tables ====
===== League table =====
Pos	Team	Pld	W	D	L	GF	GA	GD	Pts
6	Preußen Münster	38	13	14	11	55	50	+5	53
7	MSV Duisburg	38	13	13	12	43	43	0	52
8	Stuttgarter Kickers	38	13	12	13	45	46	−1	51
9	Hallescher FC	38	14	9	15	50	55	−5	51
10	Rot-Weiß Erfurt	38	14	8	16	53	49	+4	50

Source: kicker.de
Rules for classification: 1) points; 2) goal difference; 3) number of goals scored.

===== Summary table =====
Overall								Home						Away					
Pld	W	D	L	GF	GA	GD	Pts	W	D	L	GF	GA	GD	W	D	L	GF	GA	GD
38	13	12	13	45	46	−1	51	10	4	5	28	19	+9	3	8	8	17	27	−10

Last updated: 11 May 2014.

=== Württemberg Cup ===
Round	Date	Time	Venue	City	Opponent	Result	Attendance	Kickers goalscorers	Source
Round 1	Bye								
Round 2	Bye								
Round 3	4 August 2013	17:00	Carl-Diem-Stadion	Reutlingen	Young Boys Reutlingen	3–1	1,100	Ibrahimović 6'; Dicklhuber 21', 53'	
Round of 16	7 August 2013	17:45	Allgäustadion	Wangen im Allgäu	FC Wangen 05	1–0	550	Akin 83'	
Quarter-finals	11 October 2013	18:00	Stadion Weissacherstraße	Ditzingen	TSV Heimerdingen	3-0	1,500	Soriano 59', 61'; Alvarez 25'	
Semi-finals	9 April 2014	19:00	Comtech Arena	Aspach	SG Sonnenhof Großaspach	2-0	2,700	Calamita 41'; Raptis 79'	
Final	7 May 2014	19:00	Comtech Arena	Aspach	1. FC Heidenheim	2–4	2,500	Baumgärtel 36'; Müller 59'	

== Team statistics ==
Competition	First match	Last match	Starting round	Final position	Record							
Competition	First match	Last match	Starting round	Final position	G	W	D	L	GF	GA	GD	Win %
3. Liga	20 July 2013	10 May 2014	Matchday 1	8th	38	13	12	13	45	46	−1	34.21
Württemberg Cup	5 August 2013	7 May 2014	Round 3	Runners-Up	5	4	0	1	11	5	+6	80.00
Total					43	17	12	14	56	51	+5	39.53
Updated: 11 May 2014

== Squad information ==
=== Squad and statistics ===
Squad Season 2013–14
No.	Player	Nat.	Birthdate	at Kickers since	previous club	3L matches	3L goals	Cup matches	Cup goals
Goalkeepers
1	Daniel Wagner	(Germany)	11 February 1987	2009	VfR Aalen	9	0	2	0
30	Mark Redl	(Germany)	6 January 1993	2013	TSG Hoffenheim Junior Team	9	0	2	0
32	Alexander Loch	(Romania)	21 December 1990	2013	FC Singen 04	0	0	0	0
38	Markus Krauss	(Germany)	16 September 1987	2012	Fortuna Düsseldorf	21	0	1	0
56	Tobias Trautner	(Germany)	5 March 1995	2011	Junior Team	0	0	0	0
Defenders
2	Maximilian Hoffmann	(Germany)	12 September 1992	2014	Germania Schöneiche	0	0	0	0
3	Patrick Auracher	(Germany)	4 January 1990	2004	Junior Team	17	0	3	0
5	Julian Leist (vice-captain)	(Germany)	11 March 1988	2011	FC Bayern Munich II	20	0	2	0
17	Fabian Gerster	(Germany)	29 December 1986	2009	SC Pfullendorf	30	0	4	0
19	Kai-Bastian Evers	(Germany)	5 May 1990	2012	Sportfreunde Lotte	8	0	3	0
20	Athanasios Raptis	(Greece)	13 May 1995	????	Junior Team	7	0	2	1
21	Marc Stein	(Germany)	7 July 1986	2013	Kickers Offenbach	33	0	5	0
26	Royal-Dominique Fennell	(United States)	5 June 1989	2007	Junior Team	27	1	4	0
27	Fabian Baumgärtel	(Germany)	7 July 1989	2013	Alemannia Aachen	38	2	5	1
28	Pascal Schmidt	(Germany)	2 May 1993	2011	Junior Team	2	0	0	0
Midfielders
6	Sandrino Braun	(Germany)	4 July 1988	2012	SC Pfullendorf	37	2	5	0
7	Marcel Ivanusa	(Slovenia)	16 January 1985	1996	Junior Team	1	0	0	0
8	Gerrit Müller	(Germany)	26 April 1984	2013	1. FC Heidenheim	18	1	2	1
10	Vincenzo Marchese (captain)	(Italy)	19 May 1983	2009	SSV Ulm 1846	30	12	3	0
12	Andreas Ivan	(Germany)	10 January 1995	2012	Junior Team	10	0	2	0
16	Fabio Leutenecker	(Germany)	15 March 1988	2006	Junior Team	35	2	4	0
18	Kevin Dicklhuber	(Germany)	6 March 1989	2012	SC Pfullendorf	16	2	2	2
24	Mahir Savranlıoğlu	(Turkey)	7 August 1986	2009	FC Schalke 04 II	4	0	2	0
29	Marcos Alvarez	(Germany)	30 September 1991	2012	Eintracht Frankfurt II	17	4	3	1
37	Abdulsamed Akin	(Germany)	17 July 1991	2012	Normannia Gmünd	5	0	2	1
Forwards
9	Elia Soriano	(Italy)	26 June 1989	2013	Karlsruher SC	33	7	3	2
11	Karim Rouani	(France)	8 March 1982	2013	Perak FA	0	0	0	0
13	Randy Edwini-Bonsu	(Canada)	20 April 1990	2014	Eintracht Braunschweig	17	2	2	0
14	Marco Calamita	(Italy)	22 March 1983	2013	VfR Aalen	22	4	2	1
22	Daniel Engelbrecht	(Germany)	5 November 1990	2013	VfL Bochum	2	0	1	0
25	Nermin Ibrahimović	(Serbia)	4 May 1990	2012	SpVgg 07 Ludwigsburg	4	0	2	1
52	Lhadji Badiane	(France)	16 April 1987	2013	Stade Lavallois	20	5	2	0
55	Shkemb Miftari	(Germany)	1 August 1993	2013	VfL Wolfsburg II	13	0	1	0
Players transferred out during the season
4	Stefan Maletić	(Serbia)	9 April 1987	2013	NK Čelik Zenica	2	0	1	0
23	Paul Grischok	(Poland)	26 February 1986	2013	FC Etar Veliko Tarnovo	4	0	3	0
31	Patrick Milchraum	(Germany)	26 May 1984	2013	FC Dinamo Tbilisi	9	0	1	0
15	Omar Jatta	(The Gambia)	1 January 1989	2011	FV Ravensburg	2	0	2	0
Last updated: 11 May 2014

- Alexander Loch has no professional contract, he usually play at Stuttgarter Kickers II.
- Tobias Trautner has no professional contract, he usually play at Stuttgarter Kickers U19.

=== Goal scorers ===
All competitions

Scorer	Goals
(Italy) Vincenzo Marchese	12
(Italy) Elia Soriano	8
(Germany) Marcos Alvarez	5
(Italy) Marco Calamita	5
(France) Lhadji Badiane	5
(Germany) Kevin Dicklhuber	4
(Germany) Fabian Baumgärtel	3
(Canada) Randy Edwini-Bonsu	2
(Germany) Sandrino Braun	2
(Germany) Gerrit Müller	2
(Germany) Abdulsamed Akin	1
(Germany) Fabio Leutenecker	1
(United States) Royal-Dominique Fennell	1
(Greece) Athanasios Raptis	1
(Serbia) Nermin Ibrahimović	1

3. Liga

Scorer	Goals
(Italy) Vincenzo Marchese	12
(Italy) Elia Soriano	6
(France) Lhadji Badiane	5
(Germany) Marcos Alvarez	4
(Italy) Marco Calamita	4
(Germany) Kevin Dicklhuber	2
(Germany) Sandrino Braun	2
(Germany) Fabian Baumgärtel	2
(Canada) Randy Edwini-Bonsu	2
(Germany) Fabio Leutenecker	1
(United States) Royal-Dominique Fennell	1
(Germany) Gerrit Müller	1

Württemberg Cup

Scorer	Goals
(Italy) Elia Soriano	2
(Germany) Kevin Dicklhuber	2
(Germany) Abdulsamed Akin	1
(Germany) Marcos Alvarez	1
(Serbia) Nermin Ibrahimović	1
(Greece) Athanasios Raptis	1
(Italy) Marco Calamita	1
(Germany) Fabian Baumgärtel	1
(Germany) Gerrit Müller	1

Last updated: 11 May 2014

=== Penalties ===
All competitions

Player	Penalties
(Italy) Vincenzo Marchese	8 (0)

3. Liga

Player	Penalties
(Italy) Vincenzo Marchese	8 (0)

Württemberg Cup

Player	Penalties

()* = Penalties saved
Last updated: 11 May 2014

==== Clean sheets ====
Goalkeeper	Date	Competition	Opponent	Score
Daniel Wagner	7 August	Württemberg Cup	FC Wangen 05	1–0
Markus Krauss	14 September	3. Liga	Jahn Regensburg	1–0
Markus Krauss	28 September	3. Liga	Borussia Dortmund II	3–0
Markus Krauss	11 October	Württemberg Cup	TSV Heimerdingen	3–0
Markus Krauss	19 October	3. Liga	FC Hansa Rostock	2–0
Markus Krauss	9 November	3. Liga	Hallescher FC	1–0
Markus Krauss	14 December	3. Liga	SV Wehen Wiesbaden	2–0
Markus Krauss	25 January	3. Liga	Holstein Kiel	0–0
Markus Krauss	9 February	3. Liga	VfB Stuttgart II	1–0
Markus Krauss (Note: Markus Krauss and Mark Redl played both against Osnabrück for 45 minutes.)	15 February	3. Liga	VfL Osnabrück	1–0
Mark Redl	15 February	3. Liga	VfL Osnabrück	1–0
Daniel Wagner	8 March	3. Liga	Jahn Regensburg	1–0
Mark Redl	25 March	3. Liga	SV Darmstadt 98	0–0
Mark Redl	4 April	3. Liga	1. FC Saarbrücken	1–0
Mark Redl	9 April	Württemberg Cup	SG Sonnenhof Großaspach	2–0
Mark Redl	12 April	3. Liga	MSV Duisburg	2–0

==== Multi–goal matches ====
Goalscorer	Date	Competition	Opponent	Score
Two–goal matches
Kevin Dicklhuber	4 August	Württemberg Cup	Young Boys Reutlingen	3–1
Marcos Alvarez	31 August	3. Liga	VfL Osnabrück	2–2
Vincenzo Marchese	28 September	3. Liga	Borussia Dortmund II	3–0
Elia Soriano	11 October	Württemberg Cup	TSV Heimerdingen	3–0
Vincenzo Marchese	19 October	3. Liga	FC Hansa Rostock	2–0

==== Overview of statistics ====
Statistic	Overall	3. Liga	Württemberg Cup
Most appearances	Baumgärtel (43)	Baumgärtel (38)	Baumgärtel, Braun, & Stein (5)
Most starts	Baumgärtel (43)	Baumgärtel (38)	Baumgärtel, Braun & Stein (5)
Most substitute appearances	Miftari (14)	Miftari (13)	Akin, Auracher, Badiane, Edwini-Bonsu, Fennell & Grischok (2)
Top goalscorer	Marchese (12)	Marchese (12)	Dicklhuber, Soriano (2)
Last updated: 11 May 2014

=== Discipline ===
==== Bookings ====
No.	Player	Total			3. Liga			Württemberg Cup		
No.	Player	Booked	(yellow card) (red card)	Sent off (straight red)	Booked	(yellow card) (red card)	Sent off (straight red)	Booked	(yellow card) (red card)	Sent off (straight red)
1	Daniel Wagner	0	0	0	0	0	0	0	0	0
2	Maximilian Hoffmann	0	0	0	0	0	0	0	0	0
3	Patrick Auracher	4	0	1	3	0	1	1	0	0
4	Stefan Maletić	0	0	0	0	0	0	0	0	0
5	Julian Leist	1	0	0	1	0	0	0	0	0
6	Sandrino Braun	10	0	0	9	0	0	1	0	0
7	Marcel Ivanusa	0	0	0	0	0	0	0	0	0
8	Gerrit Müller	4	0	0	4	0	0	0	0	0
9	Elia Soriano	11	0	0	11	0	0	0	0	0
10	Vincenzo Marchese	9	1	1	8	1	1	1	0	0
11	Karim Rouani	0	0	0	0	0	0	0	0	0
12	Andreas Ivan	1	0	0	1	0	0	0	0	0
13	Randy Edwini-Bonsu	0	0	0	0	0	0	0	0	0
14	Marco Calamita	2	0	0	2	0	0	0	0	0
15	Omar Jatta	1	0	0	1	0	0	0	0	0
16	Fabio Leutenecker	7	0	0	7	0	0	0	0	0
17	Fabian Gerster	3	0	0	3	0	0	0	0	0
18	Kevin Dicklhuber	3	0	1	3	0	1	0	0	0
19	Kai-Bastian Evers	1	0	0	1	0	0	0	0	0
20	Athanasios Raptis	0	0	0	0	0	0	0	0	0
21	Marc Stein	4	1	0	4	1	0	0	0	0
22	Daniel Engelbrecht	0	0	0	0	0	0	0	0	0
23	Paul Grischok	0	0	0	0	0	0	0	0	0
24	Mahir Savranlıoğlu	1	0	0	1	0	0	0	0	0
25	Nermin Ibrahimović	1	0	0	1	0	0	0	0	0
26	Royal-Dominique Fennell	8	0	0	7	0	0	1	0	0
27	Fabian Baumgärtel	4	0	0	4	0	0	0	0	0
28	Pascal Schmidt	0	0	0	0	0	0	0	0	0
29	Marcos Alvarez	4	0	0	3	0	0	1	0	0
30	Mark Redl	0	0	0	0	0	0	0	0	0
31	Patrick Milchraum	0	0	0	0	0	0	0	0	0
32	Alexander Loch	0	0	0	0	0	0	0	0	0
37	Abdulsamed Akin	1	0	0	1	0	0	0	0	0
38	Markus Krauss	1	0	0	1	0	0	0	0	0
52	Lhadji Badiane	2	0	0	2	0	0	0	0	0
55	Shkemb Miftari	0	0	0	0	0	0	0	0	0
56	Tobias Trautner	0	0	0	0	0	0	0	0	0
Totals		83	2	3	78	2	3	5	0	0
Last updated: 11 May 2014

- Alexander Loch has no professional contract, he usually play at Stuttgarter Kickers II.
- Tobias Trautner has no professional contract, he usually play at Stuttgarter Kickers U19.

==== Suspensions ====
No.	Player	No. of matches served	Reason	Competition served in	Date served	Opponent(s)	Source
10	Vincenzo Marchese	1	Yellow-red card vs. SpVgg Unterhaching	3. Liga	3 September 2013	1. FC Heidenheim	
18	Kevin Dicklhuber	2	Red card vs. SpVgg Unterhaching	3. Liga	3 September 2013	1. FC Heidenheim, SSV Jahn Regensburg	
5	Julian Leist	1	Bad performances	3. Liga	7 September 2013	1. FC Heidenheim	
21	Marc Stein	1	Yellow-red card vs. Chemnitzer FC	3. Liga	21 September 2013	Borussia Dortmund II	
9	Elia Soriano	1	Fifth yellow card	3. Liga	23 November 2013	Wacker Burghausen	
16	Fabio Leutenecker	1	Fifth yellow card	3. Liga	1 February 2014	VfB Stuttgart II	
3	Patrick Auracher	1	Red card vs. VfL Osnabrück	3. Liga	15 February 2014	SpVgg Unterhaching	
10	Vincenzo Marchese	1	Fifth yellow card	3. Liga	1 March 2014	SSV Jahn Regensburg	
6	Sandrino Braun	1	Fifth yellow card	3. Liga	8 March 2014	Chemnitzer FC	
26	Royal-Dominique Fennell	1	Fifth yellow card	3. Liga	21 March 2014	SV Darmstadt 98	
9	Elia Soriano	1	tenth yellow card	3. Liga	26 April 2014	SC Preußen Münster	
10	Vincenzo Marchese	2	Red card vs. Preußen Münster	3. Liga	29 April 2014	Wacker Burghausen, RB Leipzig	

=== Transfers ===
==== Summer ====
In:

No.	Pos.	Nation	Player
4	DF	SRB	Stefan Maletić (from (Bosnia and Herzegovina) NK Čelik Zenica)
9	FW	ITA	Elia Soriano (from (Germany) Karlsruher SC)
11	FW	FRA	Karim Rouani (from (Malaysia) Perak FA)
20	DF	GRE	Athanasios Raptis (from Junior Team)
21	DF	GER	Marc Stein (from (Germany) Kickers Offenbach)
22	FW	GER	Daniel Engelbrecht (from (Germany) VfL Bochum)
23	MF	POL	Paul Grischok (from (Bulgaria) FC Etar Veliko Tarnovo)
25	FW	SRB	Nermin Ibrahimović (from (Germany) Stuttgarter Kickers II)
27	DF	GER	Fabian Baumgärtel (from (Germany) SpVgg Greuther Fürth)
30	GK	GER	Mark Redl (from (Germany) TSG Hoffenheim Junior Team)
31	MF	GER	Patrick Milchraum (from (Georgia (country)) FC Dinamo Tbilisi)
37	MF	GER	Abdulsamed Akin (from (Germany) Stuttgarter Kickers II)

Out:

No.	Pos.	Nation	Player
4	DF	GER	Simon Köpf (to (Germany) TSV Essingen)
8	FW	GER	Nicolai Groß (to (Germany) 1. FC Heidenheim)
9	FW	GER	Marco Grüttner (to (Germany) VfB Stuttgart II)|
14	MF	GER	Tobias Rühle (to (Germany) Sonnenhof Großaspach)
20	DF	GER	Thorben Stadler (to (Germany) SSV Jahn Regensburg)
22	MF	GER	Jérôme Gondorf (to (Germany) SV Darmstadt 98)
23	GK	TUR	Günay Güvenç (to (Turkey) Beşiktaş J.K.)

==== Winter ====
In:

No.	Pos.	Nation	Player
2	DF	GER	Maximilian Hoffmann (Out of contract)
8	MF	GER	Gerrit Müller (Out of contract)
12	MF	GER	Andreas Ivan (from (Germany) Junior Team)
13	FW	CAN	Randy Edwini-Bonsu (Out of contract)
14	FW	ITA	Marco Calamita (Out of contract)
52	FW	FRA	Lhadji Badiane (Out of contract)
55	FW	GER	Shkemb Miftari (from (Germany) VfL Wolfsburg II)

Out:

No.	Pos.	Nation	Player
4	DF	SRB	Stefan Maletić (to (Bosnia and Herzegovina) FK Radnik Bijeljina)
15	FW	GAM	Omar Jatta (to (Germany) SpVgg Unterhaching II)
23	MF	POL	Paul Grischok (to (Germany) Berliner FC Dynamo)
31	MF	GER	Patrick Milchraum (on loan to (Germany) FC Carl Zeiss Jena)

== Reserve team ==
Kickers' reserve team finished 10th in the Oberliga Baden-Württemberg and were coached by Jürgen Hartmann.

Note: Flags indicate national team as defined under FIFA eligibility rules; some limited exceptions apply. Players may hold more than one non-FIFA nationality.

No.	Pos.	Nation	Player
1	GK	GER	Alexander Langer
2	DF	GER	Tim Roos
3	DF	GER	Christoph Bauer
4	DF	GER	Mark-Alan Sauer
5	DF	CRO	Josip Biljeskovic
6	DF	GER	Michel Schäfer
7	FW	USA	Fabian Abramowitz
9	MF	GER	Robin Sälzle
10	MF	GER	Daniel Kaiser
11	FW	SRB	Nermin Ibrahimović
14	DF	ITA	Marco Romano

No.	Pos.	Nation	Player
15	FW	GER	Tobias Heim
16	MF	GER	Abdulsamed Akin
17	DF	ITA	Davide Pumilia
18	MF	GER	Heiko Schall
19	MF	GER	Marco Gaiser
20	MF	TUR	Ramazan Kandazoglu
21	GK	ROU	Alexander Loch
23	MF	GER	Bastian Joas
24	MF	TUR	Abdullah Sener
—	FW	CIV	Alexandre N'Gadi
