= List of Stuttgarter Kickers seasons =

This is a list of the seasons played by Stuttgarter Kickers from 1980 to the most recent seasons. The club's achievements in all major national competitions as well as the top scorers are listed. Top scorers in bold were also top scorers of the league.

== Key ==
Key to league record:
- Pld = Matches played
- W = Matches won
- D = Matches drawn
- L = Matches lost
- GF = Goals for
- GA = Goals against
- Pts = Points
- Pos = Final position

Champions	Runners-up	Promoted	Relegated

== Seasons ==
Season	League										DFB-Pokal	WFV-Pokal	Average attendance	Top goalscorer(s)		Notes
Season	Division	Tier	Pld	W	D	L	GF	GA	Pts	Pos	DFB-Pokal	WFV-Pokal	Average attendance	Player(s)	Goals	Notes
1952–53	Oberliga Süd	1	30	10	6	14	65	69	26:34	14th			9 400	Siegfried Kronenbitter	16	
1953–54	Oberliga Süd	1	30	8	5	17	63	79	21:39	14th			10 267	Erich Dreher	16	
1954–55	Oberliga Süd	1	30	10	7	13	48	56	27:33	12th			10 267	Siegfried Kronenbitter	16	
1955–56	Oberliga Süd	1	30	11	2	17	33	43	24:36	14th			10 167	Siegfried Kronenbitter	10	
1956–57	Oberliga Süd	1	30	9	4	17	46	50	22:38	14th			10 067	Rudolf Schefold	8	
1957–58	Oberliga Süd	1	30	4	7	19	31	61	15:45	16th			8 750	Ferdinand Zechmeister	12	
1958–59	2. Oberliga Süd	2	34	21	7	6	82	38	49:19	**1st**			4 647	Heinz Lettl	22	
1959–60	Oberliga Süd	1	30	5	5	20	38	80	15:45	16th			7 700	Heinz Lettl	9	
1960–61	2. Oberliga Süd	2	34	13	7	14	64	69	33:35	8th			3 082	Knut Tagliaferri	13	
1961–62	2. Oberliga Süd	2	34	12	4	18	60	61	28:40	14th			3 594	Knut Tagliaferri	17	
1962–63	2. Oberliga Süd	2	34	17	4	13	61	47	38:30	6th			3 671	Knut Tagliaferri	12	
1963–64	Regionalliga Süd	2	38	12	9	17	54	74	33:43	14th	Round 1		3 332	Manfred Ruoff	11	
1964–65	Regionalliga Süd	2	36	15	10	11	69	59	40:32	7th			3 072	Helmut Fürther	22	
1965–66	Regionalliga Süd	2	34	14	9	11	65	52	37:31	5th			3 512	Helmut Fürther; Gert Fröhlich; Rudolf Kröner	10	
1966–67	Regionalliga Süd	2	34	20	5	9	85	48	45:23	4th	Round 1		3 259	Rudolf Kröner	14	
1967–68	Regionalliga Süd	2	34	20	4	10	75	51	44:24	4th			3 094	Rainer Eisenhardt	21	
1968–69	Regionalliga Süd	2	34	15	12	7	66	43	42:26	4th			4 468	Karl-Heinz Mrosko; Helmut Fürther	14	
1969–70	Regionalliga Süd	2	38	13	7	18	61	57	33:43	12th			5 000	Ludwig Bründl	13	
1970–71	Regionalliga Süd	2	36	15	7	14	59	63	37:35	10th			3 200	**Ludwig Bründl**	**21**	
1971–72	Regionalliga Süd	2	36	12	9	15	55	71	33:39	11th			4 478	Wolfgang Holoch	14	
1972–73	Regionalliga Süd	2	34	15	5	14	60	51	35:33	8th	Round 1		5 230	Uli Frommer	12	
1973–74	Regionalliga Süd	2	34	13	10	11	60	50	36:32	6th			5 277	Wolfgang Holoch	15	
1974–75	2. Bundesliga South	2	38	13	7	18	52	61	33:43	16th	Round 1		4 647	Horst Haug	12	
1975–76	2. Bundesliga South	2	38	13	6	19	57	70	32:44	16th	Round 3		6 479	Wolfgang Holoch; Karl-Heinz Schroff; Horst Haug	9	
1976–77	2. Bundesliga South	2	38	16	7	15	59	53	39:37	10th	Round 2		6 421	Walter Kelsch; Wolfgang Holoch	12	
1977–78	2. Bundesliga South	2	38	14	12	12	63	71	40:36	10th	Round 2		2 868	Bernd Hoffmann	12	
1978–79	2. Bundesliga South	2	38	15	11	12	68	59	41:35	9th	Round 1		3 826	Karl Allgöwer	23	
1979–80	2. Bundesliga South	2	40	22	8	10	94	54	52:28	3rd	Round of 16		4 118	Karl Allgöwer	25	
1980–81	2. Bundesliga South	2	38	19	10	9	81	40	48:28	3rd	Round 3		4 229	Werner Nickel	17	
1981–82	2. Bundesliga	2	38	18	7	13	76	55	43:33	7th	Round 1		2 962	Klaus Täuber	16	
1982–83	2. Bundesliga	2	38	18	8	12	78	51	44:32	5th	Round of 16		4 521	Klaus Täuber	20	
1983–84	2. Bundesliga	2	38	13	13	14	54	52	39:37	8th	Round 2		3 583	Jürgen Klinsmann	19	
1984–85	2. Bundesliga	2	38	14	9	15	51	49	37:39	9th	Round 1		3 106	Dieter Dannenberg	16	
1985–86	2. Bundesliga	2	38	17	9	12	73	55	43:33	6th	Round 1		3 814	Andreas Merkle	15	
1986–87	2. Bundesliga	2	38	18	6	14	72	55	42:34	7th	Runners-Up		3 444	Dirk Kurtenbach	16	
1987–88	2. Bundesliga	2	38	19	13	6	89	49	51:25	**1st**	Round 2		6 137	Bernd Grabosch	16	
1988–89	Bundesliga	1	34	10	6	18	41	68	26:42	17th	Round 1		12 348	Wolfgang Schüler	9	
1989–90	2. Bundesliga	2	38	19	7	12	68	48	45:31	4th	Round 2		4 516	Wolfgang Schüler	18	
1990–91	2. Bundesliga	2	38	21	9	8	63	32	51:25	3rd	Round 2		6 486	Marcus Marin	22	
1991–92	Bundesliga	1	38	10	11	17	53	64	31:45	17th	Quarterfinal		12 682	Marcus Marin	13	
1992–93	2. Bundesliga	2	46	15	13	18	60	59	43:49	15th	Round 2		3 883	Thomas Epp	14	
1993–94	2. Bundesliga	2	38	11	13	14	42	50	35:41	16th	Round 2		3 977	Fredi Bobic	16	
1994–95	Regionalliga Süd	3	34	23	5	6	96	33	51:17	2nd	Round 3	Round 2	3 181	**Jonathan Akpoborie**	**37**	
1995–96	Regionalliga Süd	3	34	21	10	10	3	82	33	**1st**	Round 1	Round of 16	3 181	Markus Beierle	23	
1996–97	2. Bundesliga	2	34	14	11	9	38	27	53	5th	Round 1		4 916	Markus Sailer	7	
1997–98	2. Bundesliga	2	34	12	8	14	44	47	44	12th	Round 2		4 142	Markus Beierle	12	
1998–99	2. Bundesliga	2	34	11	8	15	38	53	41	13th	Round 2		4 202	Tomislav Marić	8	
1999–2000	2. Bundesliga	2	34	10	9	15	49	58	39	15th	Semifinal		4 883	**Tomislav Marić**	**21**	
2000–01	2. Bundesliga	2	34	8	10	16	31	51	34	17th	Round 1		5 404	Silvinho	6	
2001–02	Regionalliga Süd	3	34	10	14	10	42	45	44	11th	Round 1	Round 3	2 672	Giuseppe Carnevale	9	
2002–03	Regionalliga Süd	3	36	11	12	13	40	54	45	15th		Runners-Up	2 986	Sascha Benda	10	
2003–04	Regionalliga Süd	3	34	13	8	13	47	43	47	9th		Quarterfinal	3 036	Mirnes Mešić	14	
2004–05	Regionalliga Süd	3	34	12	11	11	48	43	47	9th		**Winners**	2 760	Suad Rahmanovic	14	
2005–06	Regionalliga Süd	3	34	12	12	10	46	39	48	8th	Round 1	**Winners**	2 493	Mirnes Mešić	11	
2006–07	Regionalliga Süd	3	34	14	9	11	51	41	51	4th	Round 2	Quarterfinal	3 264	**Mirnes Mešić**	**10**	
2007–08	Regionalliga Süd	3	34	11	12	11	38	35	45	10th		Round of 16	3 379	Angelo Vaccaro	11	
2008–09	3. Liga	3	38	7	11	20	38	71	29	20th		Round of 16	3 647	Angelo Vaccaro; Bashiru Gambo	5	
2009–10	Regionallliga Süd	4	34	11	15	8	43	39	48	9th		Quarterfinal	2 342	**Mijo Tunjić**	**19**	
2010–11	Regionallliga Süd	4	30	17	7	6	54	28	58	2nd		Quarterfinal	2 756	Ali Pala	10	
2011–12	Regionallliga Süd	4	34	23	9	2	66	29	78	**1st**		Quarterfinal	3 620	Marco Grüttner	11	
2012–13	3. Liga	3	38	10	10	18	39	48	40	17th		Quarterfinal	3 894	Marco Grüttner	18	
2013–14	3. Liga	3	38	13	12	13	45	46	51	8th		Runners-Up	3 969	Vincenzo Marchese	12	
2014–15	3. Liga	3	38	18	11	9	61	47	65	4th	Round 1	Quarterfinal	4 420	Marc Stein; Vincenzo Marchese	7	
2015–16	3. Liga	3	38	11	10	17	38	52	43	18th	Round 1	Semifinal	4 578	Erich Berko	11	
2016–17	Regionalliga Südwest	4	36	11	11	14	53	51	44	13th		Runners-Up	3 036	Luca Pfeiffer	9	
2017–18	Regionalliga Südwest	4	36	9	9	18	49	72	36	17th		Quarterfinal	2 503	Alessandro Abruscia	12	
2018–19	Oberliga BW	5	34	19	9	6	62	30	66	2nd		Round 3	2 805	**Mijo Tunjić**	**18**	
2019–20	Oberliga BW	5	20	10	5	5	41	23	35	3rd		Round of 16	2 680	**Mijo Tunjić**	**19**	
2020–21	Oberliga BW	5	13	9	3	1	41	12	30	2nd		Semifinal	500	Mijo Tunjić	16	
2021–22	Oberliga BW	5	38	29	4	5	91	25	91	2nd		**Winners**	2 582	Kevin Dicklhuber	20	
2022–23	Oberliga BW	5	34	26	6	2	108	17	84	**1st**	Round 2	Runners-Up	3 457	**Kevin Dicklhuber**	**30**	
