= 2000–01 Stuttgarter Kickers season =

Stuttgarter Kickers
2000–01 season
- Chairman: Axel Dünnwald-Metzler
- Manager: Hans-Jürgen Boysen (until Sep.); Rainer Zobel (since Sep.)
- Stadium: Waldau-Stadion, Stuttgart, BW
- 2. Bundesliga: 17th
- DFB-Pokal: Round 1
- Top goalscorer: League: Silvinho (6); All: Silvinho (6)
- Highest home attendance: 8,751 vs. SSV Reutlingen, 11 March 2001
- Lowest home attendance: 3,745 vs. VfL Osnabrück, 7 December 2000
Home colours

The 2000–01 Stuttgarter Kickers season was the 101st season in the club's football history. In 2000–01 the club played in the 2. Bundesliga, the second tier of German football. The club also has taken part in the 2000–01 edition of the DFB-Pokal.

== Squad information ==
=== Squad and statistics ===
Squad Season 2000–01
No.	Player	Nat.	Birthdate	at Kickers since	previous club	2. Bundesliga		DFB-Pokal	
No.	Player	Nat.	Birthdate	at Kickers since	previous club	App	Gls	App	Gls
Goalkeepers
1	Sead Ramović	(Bosnia and Herzegovina)	14 March 1979	1995	Junior Team	21	0	1	0
25	Bernd Klaus	(Germany)	19 February 1967	1994	SpVgg 07 Ludwigsburg	13	0	0	0
Defenders
2	Christian Kritzer	(Germany)	9 February 1977	2000	Karlsruher SC	31	0	1	0
4	Carsten Keuler	(Germany)	30 August 1971	1999	SpVgg Unterhaching	29	1	1	0
5	Darko Ramovš	(Federal Republic of Yugoslavia)	7 April 1973	1998	Čukarički Belgrade	7	0	0	0
6	Torsten Ziegner	(Germany)	9 November 1977	1999	FSV Zwickau	20	0	1	0
8	Cássio	(Brazil)	17 January 1970	1999	XV de Piracicaba	7	1	0	0
14	Markus Pleuler	(Germany)	10 May 1970	2000	SSV Ulm 1846	4	0	0	0
15	Günter Heberle	(Germany)	21 September 1973	2000	FC Augsburg	26	1	1	0
21	Paulo César	(Brazil)	20 January 1979	2000	Grêmio Porto Alegrense	5	0	0	0
26	Jago Maric	(Croatia)	3 February 1979	1994	Junior Team	6	0	0	0
28	Tomislav Zivic	(Croatia)	7 August 1979	1999	SV Bonlanden	0	0	0	0
??	Mario-Ernesto Rodríguez	(Uruguay)	4 September 1976	1999	SV Concordia Ihrhove	0	0	0	0
Midfielders
3	Stefan Minkwitz	(Germany)	1 June 1968	1996	Fortuna Düsseldorf	28	0	0	0
7	Carsten Marell	(Germany)	8 September 1970	1998	SV Meppen	23	0	1	0
10	Marek Penksa	(Slovakia)	4 August 1973	2000	DSV Leoben	10	2	1	0
13	Nikolaos Chatzis	(Greece)	2 May 1976	1995	SpVgg Feuerbach	3	0	0	0
16	Markus Weinzierl	(Germany)	28 December 1974	1999	FC Bayern München II	27	1	1	0
17	Torsten Raspe	(Germany)	1 August 1969	1995	SSV Ulm 1846	28	1	1	0
19	Michael Kümmerle	(Germany)	21 April 1979	1997	Junior Team	29	3	1	0
22	Cristian Fiél	(Spain)	12 March 1980	1997	Junior Team	23	2	0	0
23	Adem Kapič	(Slovenia)	16 April 1975	2000	Alemannia Aachen	8	0	1	0
24	Timo Dörflinger	(Germany)	19 September 1978	2000	TSF Ditzingen	2	0	1	1
27	Alessandro Di Martile	(Italy)	2 May 1979	1994	Junior Team	0	0	0	0
33	Borislav Georgiev	(Bulgaria)	4 September 1976	2001	POFC Botev Vratsa	6	1	0	0
Forwards
9	Silvinho	(Brazil)	26 May 1974	2000	Ituano FC	25	6	1	0
11	Stefan Meissner	(Germany)	8 March 1973	2000	Karlsruher SC	18	0	0	0
12	Alexander Blessin	(Germany)	28 May 1973	1999	VfB Stuttgart	23	5	0	0
18	Giuseppe Carnevale	(Italy)	29 June 1978	1998	Junior Team	17	2	0	0
20	Mustafa Özkan	(Turkey)	21 February 1975	1999	Grasshopper Club Zürich	6	0	0	0
30	Mark Zimmermann	(Germany)	1 March 1974	2000	SpVgg Unterhaching	29	4	1	0

== Reserve team ==
Kickers' reserve team finished 11th in the Oberliga Baden-Württemberg and were coached by Marcus Sorg.

Note: Flags indicate national team as defined under FIFA eligibility rules; some limited exceptions apply. Players may hold more than one non-FIFA nationality.

No.	Pos.	Nation	Player
—	GK	(Germany) GER	Andreas Geser
—	GK	(Germany) GER	Thorsten Szesniak
—	DF	(Germany) GER	Jago Maric
—	DF	(Turkey) TUR	Seckin Bakici
—	DF	(Turkey) TUR	Muhammer Musturuk
—	DF	(Germany) GER	Bernd Mühlbauer
—	DF	(Croatia) CRO	Tomislav Zivic
—	DF	(Germany) GER	Dirk Wüllbier
—	DF	(Italy) ITA	Leandro Guerriero
—	MF	(Germany) GER	Nico Kemmler
—	MF	(Turkey) TUR	Hamdi Dagdelen
—	MF	(Turkey) TUR	Erhan Polat

No.	Pos.	Nation	Player
—	MF	(Germany) GER	Markus Blaumoser
—	MF	(Italy) ITA	Alessandro Di Martile
—	MF	(Turkey) TUR	Mustafa Parmak
—	MF	(Germany) GER	Christoph Kunze
—	MF	(Italy) ITA	Valentino Grimaudo
—	MF	(Germany) GER	Andreas Schmid
—	FW	(Italy) ITA	Raffaele De Vito
—	FW	(Italy) ITA	Giuseppe Greco
—	FW	(Cameroon) CMR	Julien Mayada
—	FW	(Germany) GER	Robert Kristofic
—	FW	(Japan) JPN	Yu Shimamura
