= 1991–92 Stuttgarter Kickers season =

Stuttgarter Kickers
1991–92 season
- Chairman: Axel Dünnwald-Metzler
- Manager: Rainer Zobel
- Stadium: Neckarstadion, Stuttgart, BW
- Bundesliga: 17th
- DFB-Pokal: Quarterfinal
- Top goalscorer: League: Marcus Marin (13); All: Marcus Marin (13)
- Highest home attendance: 36,500 vs. VfB Stuttgart, 2 May 1992
- Lowest home attendance: 4,800 vs. 1. FC Köln, 7 December 1991

The 1991–92 Stuttgarter Kickers season is the 92nd season in the club's football history. In 1991–92 the club plays in the Bundesliga, the first tier of German football. It is the club's first season back in this league, having been promoted from the Regionalliga in 1991. The club also takes part in the 1991–92 edition of the DFB-Pokal.

== Squad information ==
=== Squad and statistics ===
Squad Season 1991–92
| No. | Player | Nat. | Birthdate | at Kickers since | previous club | Bundesliga | | DFB-Pokal | |
| No. | Player | Nat. | Birthdate | at Kickers since | previous club | App | Gls | App | Gls |
Goalkeepers
| | Stefan Brasas | (Germany) | 31 August 1967 | 1989 | FC Mahndorf | 8 | 0 | 2 | 0 |
| | Claus Reitmaier | (Germany) | 17 March 1964 | 1991 | Wiener SC | 30 | 0 | 2 | 0 |
Defenders
| | Oliver Dittberner | (Germany) | 18 October 1968 | 1990 | Hamburger SV Am. | 1 | 0 | 1 | 0 |
| | Andreas Keim | (Germany) | 8 June 1962 | 1989 | 1. FC Köln | 29 | 5 | 2 | 1 |
| | Andreas Krause | (Germany) | 16 November 1967 | 1991 | FC Marbach | 2 | 0 | 2 | 0 |
| | Karel Kula | (Czech Republic) | 10 August 1963 | 1991 | FC Baník Ostrava | 28 | 6 | 2 | 2 |
| | Jochen Novodomsky | (Germany) | 4 April 1968 | 1990 | VfL Herrenberg | 34 | 1 | 2 | 0 |
| | Thomas Ritter | (Germany) | 10 October 1967 | 1990 | BSG Fortschritt Bischofswerda | 36 | 1 | 4 | 1 |
| | Adrian Spyrka | (Germany) | 1 August 1967 | 1991 | 1. FC Saarbrücken | 19 | 0 | 0 | 0 |
| | Wolfgang Wolf | (Germany) | 24 September 1957 | 1988 | 1. FC Kaiserslautern | 28 | 0 | 4 | 0 |
Midfielders
| | Sven Berkenhagen | (Germany) | 13 December 1966 | 1991 | Greifswalder SC | 7 | 0 | 2 | 1 |
| | Juan Cayasso | (Costa Rica) | 24 June 1961 | 1990 | Deportivo Saprissa | 15 | 2 | 4 | 0 |
| | Robert Hofacker | (Germany) | 22 December 1967 | 1991 | FV Donaueschingen | 9 | 0 | 1 | 0 |
| | Matthias Imhof | (Germany) | 25 May 1968 | 1989 | Viktoria Aschaffenburg | 28 | 2 | 4 | 1 |
| | Thomas Richter | (Germany) | 1 November 1970 | 1991 | VfB Stuttgart Am. | 31 | 1 | 2 | 0 |
| | Alois Schwartz | (Germany) | 28 March 1967 | 1988 | Junior Team | 36 | 3 | 4 | 1 |
| | Reinhold Tattermusch | (Germany) | 11 April 1967 | 1989 | SV Meppen | 20 | 2 | 2 | 0 |
| | Thorsten Wörsdörfer | (Germany) | 29 September 1967 | 1991 | FC Schalke 04 | 24 | 0 | 3 | 1 |
Forwards
| | Jens-Peter Fischer | (Germany) | 1 June 1966 | 1991 | TuS Hoisdorf | 6 | 0 | 2 | 1 |
| | Marcus Marin | (Germany) | 13 December 1966 | 1990 | Hamburger SV Am. | 32 | 13 | 3 | 0 |
| | Dimitrios Moutas | (Greece) | 15 April 1968 | 1990 | SC Freiburg | 32 | 12 | 2 | 0 |
| | Ralf Vollmer | (Germany) | 5 July 1962 | 1983 | FV Lauda | 30 | 5 | 2 | 0 |
