= Football at the 1995 Pan American Games =

- Venues: Estadio José María Minella
- Date: 10–24 March
- Competitors: 12 from 12 nations

Medalists
Gold medal	Argentina
Silver medal	Mexico
Bronze medal	Colombia

The twelfth edition of the men's football tournament at the Pan American Games was held in Mar del Plata, Argentina from 10 March to 24 March 1995. Twelve teams competed, with title defender USA being eliminated in the first round. After the preliminary round there was a knock-out stage.

All the matches were held in Estadio José María Minella. Argentina, coached by Daniel Passarella, won their fifth gold medal after beating Mexico on penalties in the final match.

== Participants ==
- Argentina
- Bermuda
- Brazil
- Chile
- Colombia
- Costa Rica
- Ecuador
- Honduras
- Mexico
- Paraguay
- Trinidad and Tobago
- United States

== Group stage ==
=== Group A ===
Pos	Team	Pld	W	D	L	GF	GA	GD	Pts	Qualification
1	Argentina	3	2	1	0	6	2	+4	7	Qualified to the Final round
2	Paraguay	3	2	0	1	4	1	+3	6	Qualified to the Final round
3	Honduras	3	1	1	1	6	4	+2	4	Qualified to the Final round
4	United States	3	0	0	3	0	9	−9	0	

Source: RSSSF
12 March
20:00

Paraguay	2–0	Honduras
Gómez 75', 89'	Report

Estadio José María Minella
Referee: Ronald Gutiérrez (Costa Rica)

12 March
22:00

Argentina	3–0	United States
Gallardo 30', 45'; Ortega 49'	Report

Estadio José María Minella
Referee: John J. Toro (Colombia)

14 March
20:00

United States	0–2	Paraguay
	Report	Gómez 72'; González 82'

Estadio José María Minella
Referee: Rames Ramdhan (Trinidad and Tobago)

14 March
22:00

Argentina	2–2	Honduras
Gallardo 31', 70'	Report	Romero 14'; Cruz 36'

Estadio José María Minella

16 March
20:00

United States	0–4	Honduras
	Report	Perdomo 17'; Guevara 29'; Pavón 36', 83'

Estadio José María Minella
Referee: Gilberto Alcalá (Mexico)

16 March
22:00

Argentina	1–0	Paraguay
Ortega 65'	Report

Estadio José María Minella
Referee: Ángel Guevara (Ecuador)

=== Group B ===
Pos	Team	Pld	W	D	L	GF	GA	GD	Pts	Qualification
1	Brazil	3	2	1	0	5	2	+3	7	Qualified to the Final round
2	Costa Rica	3	2	0	1	10	3	+7	6	Qualified to the Final round
3	Chile	3	1	1	1	3	5	−2	4	Qualified to the Final round
4	Bermuda	3	0	0	3	0	8	−8	0	

Source: RSSSF
10 March
20:00

Chile	1–0	Bermuda
Lizama 31'	Report

Estadio José María Minella
Referee: Eugenio Figueroa (Uruguay)

10 March
22:00

Brazil	2–1	Costa Rica
Guiaro 17'; Silvinho 37'	Report	Gómez 85'

Estadio José María Minella
Referee: John J. Toro (Colombia)

13 March
22:00

Brazil	2–0	Bermuda
Anderson 22'; Sandro 48'	Report

Estadio José María Minella
Referee: Jim Fleming (Canada)

13 March
20:00

Costa Rica	4–1	Chile
Morales 17', 64'; Gómez 72'; Solís 89'	Report	Lobos 40'

Estadio José María Minella
Referee: Ronald Gutiérrez (Costa Rica)

15 March
20:00

Costa Rica	5–0	Bermuda
Delgado 9'; Morales 49', 65'; Gómez 82', 86'	Report

Estadio José María Minella
Referee: Osuna Romer (Bolivia)

15 March
22:00

Brazil	1–1	Chile
Silvinho 57'	Report	Lobos 69'

Estadio José María Minella
Referee: Ángel Guevara (Ecuador)

=== Group C ===
Pos	Team	Pld	W	D	L	GF	GA	GD	Pts	Qualification
1	Mexico	3	3	0	0	8	2	+6	9	Qualified to the Final round
2	Colombia	3	2	0	1	7	3	+4	6	Qualified to the Final round
3	Ecuador	3	1	0	2	6	10	−4	3	
4	Trinidad and Tobago	3	0	0	3	1	7	−6	0	

Source: RSSSF
10 March
20:00

Ecuador	2–4	Mexico
Capurro 16'; Grueso 21'	Report	Blanco 6', 28'; Hernández 35'; Salvador 90'

Estadio José María Minella
Referee: John J. Toro (Colombia)

10 March
22:00

Colombia	2–0	Trinidad and Tobago
Dinas 17'; Ricard 25'	Report

Estadio José María Minella
Referee: Ronald Gutiérrez (Costa Rica)

13 March
20:00

Mexico	1–0	Trinidad and Tobago
Hernández 86'	Report

Estadio José María Minella
Referee: Ángel Guevara (Ecuador)

13 March
22:00

Colombia	5–0	Ecuador
Zambrano 2'; Quiñonez 31'; Ricard 40'; Mackenzie 67'; Alcíbar 87'	Report

Estadio José María Minella
Referee: Gilberto Alcalá (Mexico)

15 March
20:00

Ecuador	4–1	Trinidad and Tobago
Capurro 12'; Pérez 27'; Gruezo 63', 85'	Report	Glascow 44'

Estadio José María Minella
Referee: Horacio Elizondo (Argentina)

15 March
22:00

Colombia	0–3	Mexico
	Report	Napoles 55'; Hernández 70'; Blanco 80'

Estadio José María Minella
Referee: Eugenio Figueroa (Uruguay)

== Knockout stage ==
Quarter-finals
18 March – Mar del Plata
Brazil	0 (7)
Honduras	0 (8)
18 March – Mar del Plata
Argentina	1
Chile	0
19 March – Mar del Plata
Mexico	3
Costa Rica	2
19 March – Mar del Plata
Colombia	2
Paraguay	0

Semi-finals
21 March – Mar del Plata
Honduras	2
Argentina	3
22 March – Mar del Plata
Mexico	2
Colombia	1

Final
24 March – Mar del Plata
Argentina	0 (5)
Mexico	0 (4)
Third place
24 March – Mar del Plata
Colombia	3
Honduras	0

=== Quarter finals ===
18 March
20:00

Brazil	0–0	Honduras
	Report
Penalties
Guiaro (penalty scored); Anderson (penalty scored); Bordon (penalty scored); Alberto (penalty missed); Nenê (penalty missed); Ferreira (penalty missed); Edmílson (penalty scored); Fabrício (penalty scored); Silvinho (penalty scored); Sandro (penalty scored); Adílson (penalty missed)	7–8	(penalty scored) Perdomo; (penalty missed) Suazo; (penalty scored) Pavón; (penalty missed) Lagos; (penalty scored) Castro; (penalty missed) Romero; (penalty scored) Pineda; (penalty scored) López; (penalty scored) Sierra; (penalty scored) Guevara; (penalty scored) Flores

Estadio José María Minella
Referee: Ángel Guevara (Ecuador)

18 March
22:00

Argentina	1–0	Chile
Paz 68'	Report

Estadio José María Minella
Referee: Ronald Gutiérrez (Costa Rica)

19 March
20:00

Colombia	2–0	Paraguay
González 51'; Quiñones 78'	Report

Estadio José María Minella
Referee: Gilberto Alcalá (Mexico)

19 March
22:00

Mexico	3–2	Costa Rica
García 7', 52'; Salvador 66'	Report	Soto 26'; Millins 80'

Estadio José María Minella
Referee: John J. Toro (Colombia)

=== Semi finals ===
21 March
22:00

Argentina	3–2	Honduras
Gallardo 38', 51'; Ayala 83'	Report	Romero 16'; Cruz 76'

Estadio José María Minella, Mar del Plata
Attendance: 15,000
Referee: Néstor Mondria (Chile)

22 March
22:00

Mexico	2–1	Colombia
Salvador 62', 77'	Report	Ricard 33'

Estadio José María Minella, Mar del Plata
Attendance: 5,000
Referee: Ronald Gutierrez (Costa Rica)

=== Bronze medal match ===
24 March
20:00

Colombia	3–0	Honduras
Zapata 14'; Quinones 24'; Zambrano 88'	Report

Estadio José María Minella, Mar del Plata
Attendance: 40,000
Referee: Juan J. Bernabé (Paraguay)

=== Gold medal match ===
24 March
22:00

Argentina	0–0	Mexico
	Report
Penalties
Gallardo (penalty scored); Jiménez (penalty scored); B. Schelotto (penalty scored); Paz (penalty scored); Bassedas (penalty scored)	5–4	(penalty scored) Hernández; (penalty scored) Villa; (penalty scored) Blanco; (penalty scored) Ayala; (penalty missed) García

Estadio José María Minella, Mar del Plata
Attendance: 40,000
Referee: Ángel Guevara (Ecuador)

Team details

Argentina
Mexico

GK	1	Carlos Bossio
RB	4	Javier Zanetti
CB	2	Roberto Ayala
CB	14	Pablo Paz
LB	13	Juan Pablo Sorín
MF	16	Diego Cagna	(substituted off) 62'
MF	5	Jorge Jiménez
MF	11	Christian Bassedas
MF	10	Marcelo Gallardo
RW	7	Ariel Ortega
CF	9	Sebastián Rambert	(substituted off) 66'
Substitutes:
MF	8	Roberto Monserrat	(substituted on) 62'
FW	18	Guillermo B. Schelotto	(substituted on) 66'
Manager:
(Argentina) Daniel Passarella

GK	12	Oswaldo Sánchez
RB	2	Pável Pardo	Sent off (straight red)
CB	3	Marcos Ayala
LB	4	Braulio Luna
RM	10	Rafael García
CM	8	Germán Villa
CM	16	Manuel Sol		(substituted off) 54'
CM	6	Raúl Lara
LM	14	Jesús Arellano
FW	7	Luis Hernández
FW	17	Gustavo Nápoles		(substituted off) 75'
Substitutes:
MF	11	Cuauhtémoc Blanco		(substituted on) 54'
MF	15	Agustín García		(substituted on) 75'
Manager:
(Mexico) Guillermo V. Mejía

== Award ==
1995 Pan American Games winners

Argentina
Fifth title

== Medalists ==
Event	Gold	Silver	Bronze
Men's football	Argentina: 1. Carlos Bossio; 2. Roberto Ayala; 3. Rodolfo Arruabarrena; 4. Javier Zanetti; 5. Jorge Jiménez; 6. Pablo Rotchen; 7. Ariel Ortega; 8. Roberto Monserrat; 9. Sebastián Rambert; 10. Marcelo Gallardo; 11. Christian Bassedas; 12. Javier Lavallén; 13. Juan Pablo Sorín; 14. Pablo Paz; 15. Claudio Husain; 16. Diego Cagna; 17. Hernán Crespo; 18. Guillermo B. Schelotto; Daniel Passarella (coach)	Mexico: 1. Óscar Pérez; 2. Pável Pardo; 3. Marcos Ayala; 4. Braulio Luna; 5. Edson Astivia; 6. Raúl Lara; 7. Luis Hernández; 8. Germán Villa; 9. Luis M. Salvador; 10. Rafael García; 11. Cuauhtémoc Blanco; 12. Oswaldo Sánchez; 13. Ricardo Munguía; 14. Jesús Arellano; 15. Agustín García; 16. Manuel Sol; 17. Gustavo Nápoles; 18. Edson Alvarado; Guillermo V. Mejía (coach)	Colombia: 1. Oscar Córdoba; 2. Wilmer Ortegón; 3. Juan D. Vélez; 4. Juan C. Beltrán; 5. Jorge Peláez; 6. José A. Valencia; 7. Henry Zambrano; 8. Arley Betancourth; 9. Harry Castillo; 10. Oswaldo Mackenzie; 11. Alonso Alcíbar; 12. Daniel A. Vélez; 13. Víctor Mafla; 14. Martín Zapata; 15. Arley Dinas; 16. Luis Quiñonez; 17. Jersson González; 18. Hámilton Ricard; Norberto Peluffo (coach)

== Goalscorers ==
6 goals

- (Argentina) Marcelo Gallardo

5 goals

- (Costa Rica) Rónald Gómez

4 goals

- (Mexico) Luis Salvador
- (Mexico) Sergio Morales

3 goals

- (Ecuador) Carlos Grueso
- (Paraguay) David Gómez
- (Mexico) Cuauhtémoc Blanco
- (Colombia) Hamilton Ricard
- (Colombia) Luis Quiñónez
- (Brazil) Silvinho
- (Mexico) Cuauhtémoc Blanco
- (Mexico) Luis Hernández

Source: PanamSports
