= Andreas Krause =

Andreas Krause may refer to:

- Andreas Krause (admiral) (born 1956), German Navy admiral
- Andreas Krause (footballer born 1957), East German football midfielder
- Andreas Krause (footballer born 1967), German football defender and poker player
- Andreas Krause Landt (born 1963), German publisher
- Andreas Krause (computer scientist), German academic
