= Auracher =

Auracher is a surname. Notable people with the surname include:

- Patrick Auracher (born 1990), German footballer
- Thomas Auracher (born 1969), German yacht racer
