= 1988–89 Stuttgarter Kickers season =

Stuttgarter Kickers
1988–89 season
- Chairman: Axel Dünnwald-Metzler
- Manager: Manfred Krafft
- Stadium: Neckarstadion, Stuttgart, BW
- Bundesliga: 17th
- DFB-Pokal: Round 1
- Top goalscorer: League: Wolfgang Schüler (9); All: Wolfgang Schüler (9)
- Highest home attendance: 32,000 vs. 1. FC Nürnberg, 17 June 1989
- Lowest home attendance: 3,800 vs. Bayer Uerdingen, 26 November 1988

The 1988–89 Stuttgarter Kickers season is the 89th season in the club's football history. In 1988–89 the club play in the Bundesliga, the first tier of German football. It is the club's first season in this league, having been promoted from the 2. Bundesliga in 1988. The club also takes part in the 1988–89 edition of the DFB-Pokal.

== Squad information ==
=== Squad and statistics ===
Squad Season 1988–89
No.	Player	Nat.	Birthdate	at Kickers since	previous club	Bundesliga		DFB-Pokal	
No.	Player	Nat.	Birthdate	at Kickers since	previous club	App	Gls	App	Gls
Goalkeepers
	Armin Jäger	(Germany)	19 September 1962	1986	VfB Stuttgart	7	0	0	0
	Kari Laukkanen	(Finland)	14 December 1963	1987	Kuopion Palloseura	28	0	1	0
Defenders
	Runald Ossen	(Germany)	18 May 1963	1987	SC Birkenfeld	28	1	1	0
	Andreas Keim	(Germany)	8 June 1962	1989	1. FC Köln	17	0	0	0
	Bernd Schindler	(Germany)	28 December 1961	1983	1. FC 08 Walldorf	29	2	1	0
	Alfred Schön	(Germany)	13 January 1962	1988	SV Waldhof Mannheim	29	0	1	0
	Heribert Stadler	(Germany)	4 January 1964	1985	VfB Stuttgart Am.	7	0	1	0
	Wolfgang Wolf	(Germany)	24 September 1957	1988	1. FC Kaiserslautern	32	5	1	0
Midfielders
	Ralf Allgöwer	(Germany)	4 April 1964	1987	VfB Stuttgart	11	0	1	0
	Frank Elser	(Germany)	5 October 1958	1985	SSV Ulm 1846	14	1	1	0
	Dirk Fengler	(Germany)	3 March 1970	1987	Junior Team	7	0	0	0
	Bernd Grabosch	(Germany)	23 September 1958	1986	FC Schalke 04	28	3	1	1
	Alois Schwartz	(Germany)	28 March 1967	1988	Junior Team	15	0	0	0
	Hans Hein	(Germany)	29 May 1955	1989	SV Waldhof Mannheim	16	3	1	0
	Ari Hjelm	(Finland)	24 February 1962	1988	Ilves	32	5	1	0
	Andreas Kleinhansl	(Germany)	21 December 1963	1983	Junior Team	20	0	0	0
	Niels Schlotterbeck	(Germany)	12 March 1967	1983	Junior Team	22	0	1	0
Forwards
	Uwe Igler	(Germany)	14 November 1964	1987	SpVgg 07 Ludwigsburg	10	2	0	0
	Wolfgang Schüler	(Germany)	17 February 1958	1988	Blau-Weiß 90 Berlin	26	9	0	0
	Demir Hotić	(Socialist Federal Republic of Yugoslavia)	15 April 1968	1987	Union Solingen	23	7	0	0
	Ralf Vollmer	(Germany)	5 July 1962	1983	FV Lauda	32	3	1	0
