= Jochen Novodomsky =

German footballer

Personal information
- Date of birth: 4 April 1968 (age 58)
- Place of birth: Herrenberg, West Germany
- Height: 1.88 m (6 ft 2 in)
- Position: Defender

Youth career
- VfL Herrenberg
- Stuttgarter Kickers

Senior career*
Years	Team	Apps	(Gls)
1990–1997	Stuttgarter Kickers	117	(3)
1997–1998	Reutlingen 05	10	(0)
1998–1999	VfL Sindelfingen		
- * Club domestic league appearances and goals

Jochen Novodomsky (born 4 April 1968) is a German former footballer who played as a defender. He is best known for playing for Stuttgarter Kickers between 1990 and 1997.

Novodomsky played youth football for VfL Herrenberg before joining Stuttgarter Kickers. He made over 100 appearances across a seven-year spell for the club. After leaving the Kickers in 1997, Novodomsky went on to play for Reutlingen 05 and VfL Sindelfingen.

== Career statistics ==
Appearances and goals by club, season and competition
Club	Season	League			National Cup		Other		Total	
Club	Season	Division	Apps	Goals	Apps	Goals	Apps	Goals	Apps	Goals
Stuttgarter Kickers	1990–91	2. Bundesliga	20	0	1	0	3 (Note: Appearance(s) in Bundesliga relegation play-offs)	0	24	0
Stuttgarter Kickers	1991–92	Bundesliga	34	1	2	0	0	0	36	1
Stuttgarter Kickers	1992–93	2. Bundesliga	5	1	0	0	0	0	5	1
Stuttgarter Kickers	1993–94	2. Bundesliga	15	1	0	0	0	0	15	1
Stuttgarter Kickers	1994–95	Regionalliga Süd	15	0	2	0	0	0	17	0
Stuttgarter Kickers	1995–96	Regionalliga Süd	19	0	1	0	0	0	20	0
Stuttgarter Kickers	1996–97	2. Bundesliga	9	0	1	0	0	0	10	0
Stuttgarter Kickers	Total		117	3	7	0	3	0	127	3
Reutlingen 05	1997–98	Regionalliga Süd	10	0	1	0	0	0	11	0
Career total			127	3	8	0	3	0	138	3
