= 1983–84 2. Bundesliga =

10th season of the second-tier football league in Germany

2. Bundesliga
- Season: 1983–84
- Champions: Karlsruher SC
- Promoted: Karlsruher SC; FC Schalke 04
- Relegated: Rot-Weiss Essen; SC Charlottenburg; VfL Osnabrück; BV 08 Lüttringhausen
- Matches: 380
- Top goalscorer: Roland Wohlfarth (30 goals)
- Average attendance: 6,020

The 1983–84 2. Bundesliga season was the tenth season of the 2. Bundesliga, the second tier of the German football league system.

Karlsruher SC and FC Schalke 04 were promoted to the Bundesliga while Rot-Weiss Essen, SC Charlottenburg, VfL Osnabrück and BV 08 Lüttringhausen were relegated to the Oberliga.

== League table ==
For the 1983–84 season Rot-Weiß Oberhausen, SC Charlottenburg, SSV Ulm 1846 and 1. FC Saarbrücken were newly promoted to the 2. Bundesliga from the Oberliga while Hertha BSC, FC Schalke 04 and Karlsruher SC had been relegated to the league from the Bundesliga.

Locations of the participating teams of the 1983–84 season

Pos	Team	Pld	W	D	L	GF	GA	GD	Pts	Promotion, qualification or relegation
1	Karlsruher SC (C, P)	38	25	7	6	94	45	+49	57	Promotion to Bundesliga
2	Schalke 04 (P)	38	23	9	6	95	45	+50	55	Promotion to Bundesliga
3	MSV Duisburg	38	20	10	8	69	41	+28	50	Qualification to promotion play-offs
4	KSV Hessen Kassel	38	20	8	10	68	39	+29	48	
5	SG Union Solingen	38	17	10	11	70	54	+16	44	
6	Alemannia Aachen	38	17	10	11	49	43	+6	44	
7	SC Freiburg	38	13	17	8	50	49	+1	43	
8	Stuttgarter Kickers	38	13	13	12	54	52	+2	39	
9	Fortuna Köln	38	14	10	14	66	65	+1	38	
10	1. FC Saarbrücken	38	14	10	14	61	69	−8	38	
11	Hertha BSC	38	13	11	14	64	57	+7	37	
12	Darmstadt 98	38	11	13	14	48	72	−24	35	
13	SSV Ulm 1846	38	10	12	16	58	68	−10	32	
14	Hannover 96	38	10	12	16	54	69	−15	32	
15	SG Wattenscheid 09	38	11	10	17	58	74	−16	32	
16	Rot-Weiß Oberhausen	38	10	11	17	51	62	−11	31	
17	Rot-Weiss Essen (R)	38	7	15	16	48	63	−15	29	Relegation to Oberliga
18	SC Charlottenburg (R)	38	10	9	19	49	68	−19	29	Relegation to Oberliga
19	VfL Osnabrück (R)	38	11	7	20	46	66	−20	29	Relegation to Oberliga
20	BV Lüttringhausen (R)	38	6	6	26	36	87	−51	18	Relegation to Oberliga

Source: Bundesliga.de
Rules for classification: 1) points; 2) goal difference; 3) number of goals scored.
(C) Champions; (P) Promoted; (R) Relegated

== Results ==
Home \ Away	AAC	BSC	SCC	D98	DUI	RWE	SCF	H96	KSC	KAS	FKO	BVL	RWO	OSN	FCS	S04	SGU	SKI	ULM	SGW
Alemannia Aachen	—	2–1	3–0	2–2	2–1	1–1	3–1	5–1	0–0	0–0	0–0	1–0	0–0	1–0	2–1	1–2	2–0	0–1	3–1	3–1
Hertha BSC	2–2	—	1–1	0–0	1–4	1–0	1–1	3–1	0–2	2–0	7–2	1–1	3–2	3–1	3–0	2–3	1–2	1–0	1–0	1–1
SC Charlottenburg	0–1	1–0	—	1–2	0–0	2–0	1–2	2–0	0–3	1–1	2–1	3–2	2–2	0–1	8–1	1–1	3–3	2–1	2–1	2–1
Darmstadt 98	3–1	4–3	2–1	—	0–2	1–1	0–2	1–1	1–3	2–1	1–5	3–0	2–0	3–0	1–1	0–2	0–0	5–2	4–3	2–1
MSV Duisburg	3–0	4–2	4–0	0–0	—	1–1	0–0	2–5	2–1	3–0	3–2	4–1	4–3	2–0	4–0	1–1	1–2	1–1	2–0	3–0
Rot-Weiss Essen	2–4	4–1	4–2	4–0	0–0	—	1–1	0–1	0–4	1–1	2–1	4–0	1–1	3–2	0–5	1–1	1–1	1–1	1–1	1–1
SC Freiburg	2–1	1–0	2–2	3–1	1–1	1–0	—	2–2	2–2	0–0	0–0	3–3	1–0	2–0	1–1	1–0	2–1	2–1	1–1	4–1
Hannover 96	0–0	0–0	2–1	1–1	0–2	0–1	1–1	—	1–5	1–2	1–1	4–1	1–1	3–2	2–1	1–4	4–5	2–2	3–3	3–1
Karlsruher SC	1–0	2–2	2–0	4–0	0–0	3–0	2–1	0–1	—	2–0	4–3	3–2	4–2	4–1	5–1	3–0	3–2	1–1	6–0	3–2
Hessen Kassel	2–0	2–2	4–2	2–1	0–1	2–0	0–0	2–0	3–0	—	2–0	4–2	3–2	1–0	2–0	0–2	6–1	3–0	5–1	3–0
Fortuna Köln	2–0	3–1	1–1	5–1	1–1	2–2	3–1	2–2	1–3	2–1	—	2–0	3–1	3–0	1–2	0–2	1–3	2–0	2–1	0–0
BV Lüttringhausen	1–3	1–4	2–0	1–1	1–2	3–1	1–0	0–2	1–4	0–4	0–1	—	2–1	3–0	1–2	0–4	1–1	0–2	0–0	2–1
Rot-Weiß Oberhausen	0–0	0–1	2–1	4–0	0–2	2–2	1–0	1–0	1–0	1–1	3–0	4–0	—	1–1	3–0	3–3	1–0	1–1	0–3	3–1
VfL Osnabrück	0–0	0–0	1–2	0–0	2–3	1–0	0–0	2–1	4–2	1–3	0–4	1–0	2–1	—	4–0	1–0	3–1	2–2	2–1	6–4
1. FC Saarbrücken	2–0	3–2	4–1	1–1	2–0	1–1	4–4	2–1	0–2	1–3	1–2	2–1	5–1	2–1	—	1–1	1–1	3–3	2–0	5–0
Schalke 04	5–0	1–5	3–0	6–0	4–2	3–2 (Note: The Schalke 04 v Rot-Weiss Essen match from 27 May 1984, which finished with a score of 5–0, was annulled by the DFB and was required to be replayed due to fans of Schalke 04 storming the pitch during play. The replay took place on 10 June 1984 and finished with a score of 3–2.)	6–0	5–1	3–3	3–1	6–2	2–0	3–0	3–1	1–1	—	3–3	2–1	3–0	5–2
Union Solingen	3–0	1–0	1–0	2–1	0–1	3–2	5–0	1–2	2–0	0–2	2–2	1–1	3–0	2–0	2–0	4–0	—	1–2	4–2	1–2
Stuttgarter Kickers	1–2	0–2	1–0	5–0	3–1	1–0	2–1	2–1	2–3	1–0	4–1	3–1	1–1	1–1	1–1	0–0	2–2	—	1–0	0–0
SSV Ulm	1–2	2–2	1–1	1–1	3–1	5–2	1–4	2–1	2–2	2–2	1–1	7–0	3–2	1–0	2–0	1–0	1–3	2–0	—	1–1
SG Wattenscheid	0–2	3–2	5–1	1–1	2–1	2–1	0–0	1–1	2–3	2–0	4–2	2–1	3–0	4–3	1–2	0–2	1–1	4–2	1–1	—

Source: DFB
Legend: Blue = home team win; Yellow = draw; Red = away team win.

== Top scorers ==
The league's top scorers:

Goals	Player	Team
30	(Germany) Roland Wohlfarth	MSV Duisburg
29	(Germany) Emanuel Günther	Karlsruher SC
21	(Germany) Wolfgang Schäfer	SG Union Solingen
20	(Germany) Heinz Traser	KSV Hessen Kassel
19	(Germany) Jürgen Klinsmann	Stuttgarter Kickers
19	(Germany) Helmut Rombach	Alemannia Aachen
19	(Germany) Wolfgang Schüler	Karlsruher SC
19	(Germany) Klaus Täuber	FC Schalke 04
17	(Germany) Joachim Löw	SC Freiburg
15	(Germany) Jörg Gaedke	SC Charlottenburg
15	(Germany) Heikko Glöde	Hertha BSC Berlin
15	(Germany) Maximilian Hauck	SSV Ulm 1846
15	(Germany) Daniel Jurgeleit	SG Union Solingen
15	(Germany) Uwe Kuhl	SV Darmstadt 98
