= Markus Krauss =

German footballer

Personal information
- Date of birth: September 16, 1987 (age 39)
- Place of birth: Sibiu, Romania
- Height: 1.95 m (6 ft 5 in)
- Position: Goalkeeper

Youth career
- TSV Eltingen
- –2005: SV Böblingen
- 2005–2006: SSV Reutlingen

Senior career*
Years	Team	Apps	(Gls)
2006–2008	SSV Reutlingen	17	(0)
2008–2009	1860 Munich II	26	(0)
2008–2009	1860 Munich	0	(0)
2010–2011	VfB Stuttgart II	2	(0)
2011–2012	Fortuna Düsseldorf II	22	(0)
2011–2012	Fortuna Düsseldorf	0	(0)
2012–2014	Stuttgarter Kickers	30	(0)
2014–2015	SV Waldhof Mannheim	23	(0)
Total		120	(0)

Managerial career
- 2015–2018: VfB Stuttgart U17 (goalkeeping coach)
- 2018–: VfB Stuttgart U19 (goalkeeping coach)
- * Club domestic league appearances and goals

Markus Krauss (born September 16, 1987) is a German retired footballer who played as a goalkeeper.

== Career ==
Krauss played in the youth for the TSV Eltingen and SV Böblingen, and graduated in 2005 the SSV Reutlingen 05 at. In the 2005/06 season Krauss increased with the A-Youth Reutlingen in the U-19 Bundesliga on. After the 2007–08 season in the Regionalliga Süd had completed 17 games for the first team of SSV, Krauss joined the then second division club TSV 1860 München. There he came for the second team on 26 Regional inserts. Krauss trained since the summer of 2009 as a guest player for the second team of VfB Stuttgart with and received on 29 January 2010 at VfB a contract until the end of June 2011th

Krauss was on 30 April 2010 at the 37th matchday of the 2009/10 season for VfB II in the third Professional league against SpVgg Unterhaching his professional debut.

For the 2011/12 season Krauss joined to the second division Fortuna Düsseldorf. He completed 22 times this season for the second team in Düsseldorf in the West Regional and rose without a separate application for the first team with the Fortuna in the Bundesliga on.

After a year in Düsseldorf Krauss closed for subsequent season the Stuttgarter Kickers on. [2] For the 2014/15 season Krauss moved to the third division SV Waldhof Mannheim.
