= Daniel Wagner (footballer) =

German footballer

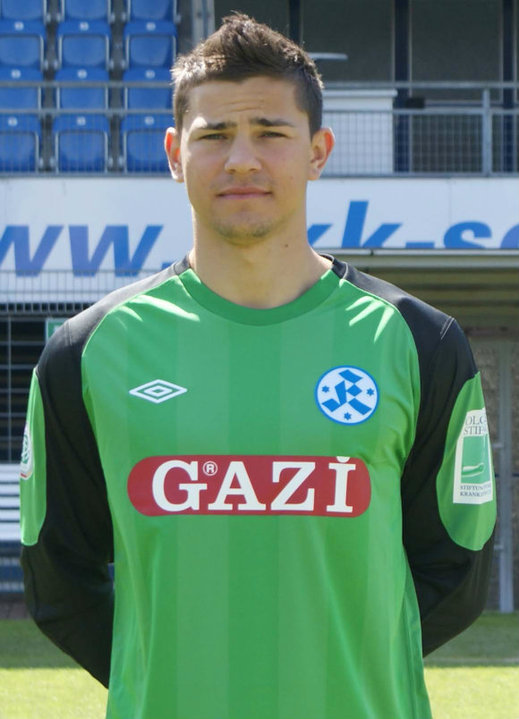

Personal information
- Date of birth: 11 February 1985 (age 41)
- Place of birth: Nuremberg, West Germany
- Position: Goalkeeper

Team information
- Current team: TSV Plattenhardt
- Number: 1

Youth career
- 2003–2006: 1. FC Nürnberg

Senior career*
Years	Team	Apps	(Gls)
2006–2008	SV Seligenporten		
2008–2009	VfR Aalen	0	(0)
2009–2014	Stuttgarter Kickers	112	(0)
2015–	TSV Plattenhardt	1	(0)
- * Club domestic league appearances and goals as of 1 May 2015

Daniel Wagner (born 11 February 1987) is a German footballer who plays for TSV Plattenhardt.
