= Thomas Richter (footballer, born 1970) =

German footballer

Personal information
- Date of birth: 1 November 1970 (age 56)
- Place of birth: Waiblingen, West Germany
- Height: 1.82 m (6 ft 0 in)
- Position: Defender

Youth career
- TSV Vestenbergsgreuth
- SSV Reutlingen
- VfB Stuttgart
- SGV Hochdorf

Senior career*
Years	Team	Apps	(Gls)
1991–1993	Stuttgarter Kickers	40	(1)
1993–1997	Greuther Fürth		
1997–1998	1. FC Nürnberg	43	(4)
1999	1860 Munich	5	(0)
1999–2000	1. FC Magdeburg		
2001	Greuther Fürth		
2001–2002	FC Augsburg		
2002	Bonner SC		
2003	TSV Crailsheim		
2003–2005	SC 04 Schwabach		
2005–2007	FC Ingolstadt 04 II		
- * Club domestic league appearances and goals

Thomas Richter (born 1 November 1970) is a German former professional footballer who played as a defender.
