= Alessandro Di Martile =

Italian footballer (born 1979)

Personal information
- Date of birth: 2 May 1979 (age 47)
- Place of birth: Nürtingen, West Germany
- Height: 1.73 m (5 ft 8 in)
- Position: Midfielder

Youth career
- TV Unterboihingen
- FV 09 Nürtingen
- 1994–1997: Stuttgarter Kickers

Senior career*
Years	Team	Apps	(Gls)
1997–2001	Stuttgarter Kickers II	103	(22)
1999	Stuttgarter Kickers	1	(0)
2001–2002	FC Schaffhausen		
2002–2007	FC 08 Villingen		
2007–2008	SGV Freiberg	13	(0)
2008–2010	1. FC Frickenhausen		
2010–2011	TSV Wendlingen		
2011–2013	TSV Oberlenningen		
2013–2016	TSuGV Großbettlingen		

Managerial career
- 2011–2013: TSV Oberlenningen (player-coach)
- 2013–2016: TSuGV Großbettlingen (player-coach)
- * Club domestic league appearances and goals

Alessandro Di Martile (born 2 May 1979) is an Italian former football manager and player.

== Career ==
Di Martile played youth football for TV Unterboihingen and FV 09 Nürtingen before joining the academy of Stuttgarter Kickers. He would go on to make more than 100 appearances for the reserve team, Stuttgarter Kickers II. He made his professional debut for the first team on 14 May 1999, coming on as a substitute in the 65th minute of a 2–0 loss in the 2. Bundesliga to SpVgg Unterhaching. He could not establish himself in the team, however, and moved to Swiss club FC Schaffhausen in 2001. The following years, Di Martile played in the lower tiers of German football for clubs such as FC 08 Villingen and SGV Freiberg. He retired from football as a player-coach in the Kreisliga for TSuGV Großbettlingen.
