= Mark Redl =

German footballer

Personal information
- Full name: Mark-Patrick Redl
- Date of birth: 6 January 1993 (age 33)
- Place of birth: Malsch, Germany
- Height: 1.91 m (6 ft 3 in)
- Position: Goalkeeper

Team information
- Current team: SV Oberachern
- Number: 1

Youth career
- SV 08 Kuppenheim
- SV Niederbühl
- –2009: FC Rastatt 04
- 2009–2012: TSG Hoffenheim

Senior career*
Years	Team	Apps	(Gls)
2012–2013	TSG Hoffenheim II	0	(0)
2013–2015	Stuttgarter Kickers	12	(0)
2013–2015	Stuttgarter Kickers II	10	(0)
2015–2016	Borussia Dortmund II	0	(0)
2016–2017	FC Kaiserslautern II	0	(0)
2017–2021	FC 08 Homburg	28	(0)
2021–	SV Oberachern	50	(0)
- * Club domestic league appearances and goals as of 19 November 2022

Mark-Patrick Redl (born 6 January 1993) is a German footballer who plays for SV Oberachern.
