= Stefan Maletić =

Serbian footballer

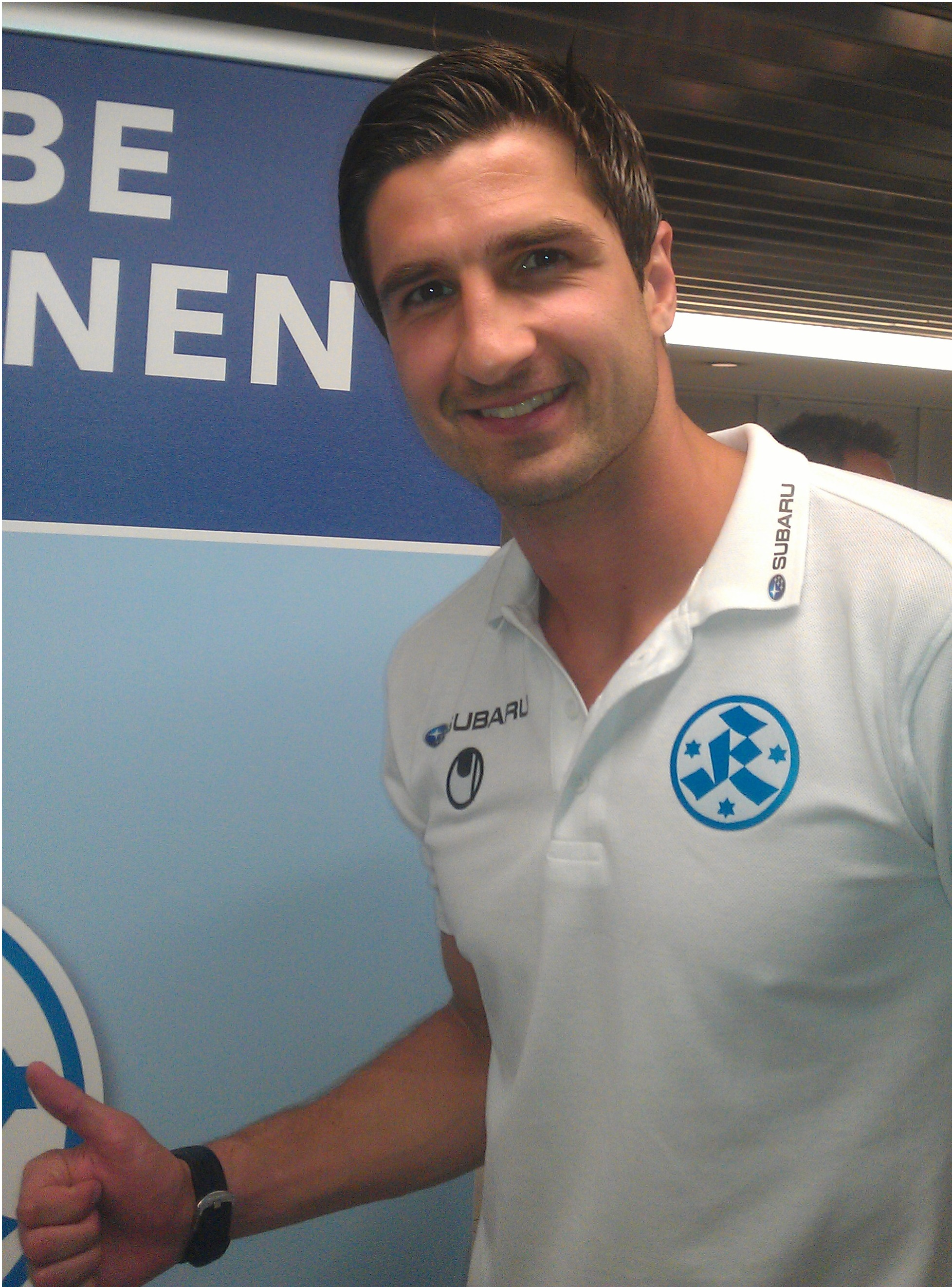
- Maletić with Stuttgarter Kickers

Personal information
- Date of birth: 9 April 1987 (age 39)
- Place of birth: Belgrade, Yugoslavia
- Height: 1.95 m (6 ft 5 in)
- Position: Centre-back

Senior career*
| Years | Team | Apps | (Gls) |
| 2009–2010 | Frem | 5 | (1) |
| 2010–2011 | FC Oss | 9 | (0) |
| 2011–2012 | Limhamns IF | 10 | (0) |
| 2012 | Kozara Gradiška | 12 | (0) |
| 2012–2013 | Čelik Zenica | 19 | (1) |
| 2013–2014 | Stuttgarter Kickers | 2 | (0) |
| 2013–2014 | Radnik Bijeljina | 7 | (0) |
| 2014–2015 | Achilles '29 | 8 | (2) |
| 2015 | Burton Albion | 0 | (0) |
| 2015–2016 | DOVO | | |
| 2016–2017 | JVC Cuijk | | |
| 2017–2018 | GSV Geldern | 22 | (6) |
| 2018–2020 | SV Veert | 6 | (2) |
- * Club domestic league appearances and goals

Stefan Maletić (born 9 April 1987) is a Dutch-Serbia former professional footballer who played as a centre-back. He works as an assistant manager at Eredivisie side NEC.

He left amateur side JVC Cuijk at the end of the 2016-17 season. After finishing his career at German outfit SV Veert he went into coaching, working at the De Graafschap and the PSV academies before joining NEC in 2020 as an assistant to manager Rogier Meijer.

== Personal life ==
His family is originally from Zenica in Bosnia and Herzegovina. He is the older brother of Marko Maletić, who is also a footballer.
