= Borislav Georgiev =

Bulgarian footballer

Personal information
- Full name: Borislav Asenov Georgiev
- Date of birth: 17 July 1974 (age 52)
- Place of birth: Bulgaria
- Height: 1.69 m (5 ft 7 in)
- Positions: Right back; defensive midfielder

Senior career*
Years	Team	Apps	(Gls)
1993–1995	Chardafon Gabrovo		
1995–1999	Spartak Varna	89	(1)
1999–2001	Sachsen Leipzig	56	(2)
2001–2002	Lokomotiv Sofia	30	(0)
2002–2008	Kallithea	107	(1)
2008–2009	Levadiakos	17	(0)
2009–2010	Slavia Sofia	23	(0)
2011	Etar 1924	8	(1)
- * Club domestic league appearances and goals

Borislav Georgiev (Bulgarian: Борислав Георгиев; born 17 July 1974) is a former Bulgarian footballer. In his career he played as a defender and defensive midfielder.

Georgiev played for Sachsen Leipzig in Germany and for Kallithea and Levadiakos in the Super League Greece. In August 2011, he joined Etar 1924.
