= Christoph Burkhard =

German footballer

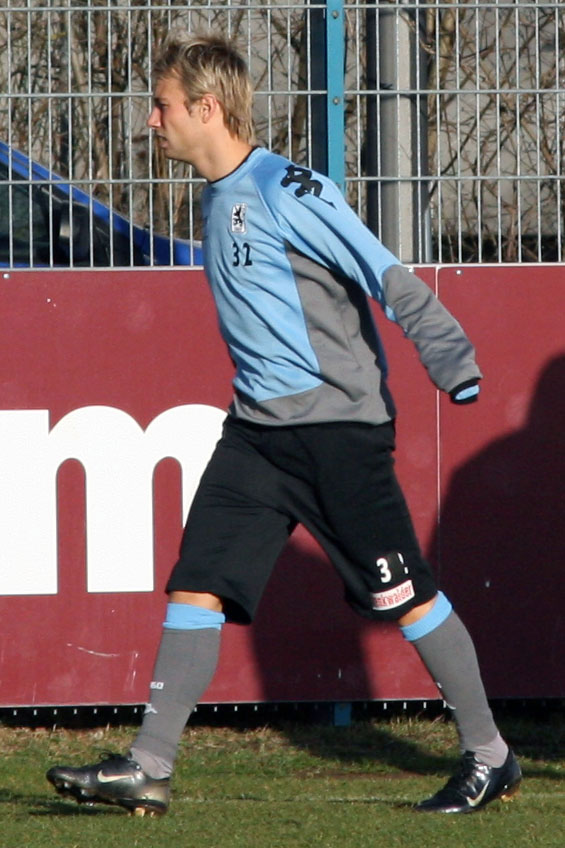
- Burkhard in 2007

Personal information
- Date of birth: 19 November 1984 (age 41)
- Place of birth: Aichach, West Germany
- Height: 1.73 m (5 ft 8 in)
- Position: Defender

Youth career
- TSV Hollenbach
- BC Aichach
- 1997–2000: FC Augsburg
- 2000–2003: 1860 Munich

Senior career*
Years	Team	Apps	(Gls)
2003–2009	1860 Munich II	118	(5)
2006–2009	1860 Munich	14	(0)
2009–2017	Wacker Burghausen	242	(32)
2017–2019	FC Pipinsried	48	(2)
Total		422	(39)

Managerial career
- 2017–2018: FC Pipinsried (player-assistant)
- * Club domestic league appearances and goals

Christoph Burkhard (born 19 November 1984) is a German former professional footballer who played as a defender.

== Career ==
Burkhard was born in Aichach. He made his professional debut in the 2. Bundesliga for TSV 1860 Munich on 18 August 2006 coming on as a substitute in the 86th minute in a game against Kickers Offenbach.
