= Mario-Ernesto Rodríguez =

Uruguayan footballer (born 1976)

Personal information
- Full name: Mario-Ernesto Rodríguez Berutti
- Date of birth: 4 September 1976 (age 50)
- Place of birth: Montevideo, Uruguay
- Height: 1.81 m (5 ft 11 in)
- Position: Defender

Youth career
- Club Nacional de Football

Senior career*
Years	Team	Apps	(Gls)
1994–1995	C.A. Progreso	24	(0)
1995–1997	Kickers Emden	6	(0)
1997–1998	FC Groningen	28	(0)
1998–1999	SV Concordia Ihrhove		
1999–2000	Stuttgarter Kickers	1	(0)
1999–2000	Stuttgarter Kickers II	19	(1)
2000	Tennis Borussia Berlin	4	(0)
2001–2004	SV Concordia Ihrhove	57	(11)
2004–2006	BV Cloppenburg	49	(3)
2006–2007	VfL Germania Leer		
2007–2008	BV Cloppenburg	15	(1)
- * Club domestic league appearances and goals

Mario-Ernesto Rodríguez Berrutti (born 4 September 1976 in Montevideo) is a Uruguayan-born former Italian footballer.

At the age of 19, Rodríguez moved from C.A. Progreso in his native Uruguay to Germany to join the Regionalliga Nord side Kickers Emden. He spent a year in the Dutch Eredivisie with FC Groningen, making 28 appearances, and later played one game for the Stuttgarter Kickers in the 2. Bundesliga. He spent the rest of his footballing career in the lower German Oberliga and retired from the sport in 2008.

Rodríguez now lives with his family on Mallorca where he is a hotelier.
