= Patrick Milchraum =

German footballer

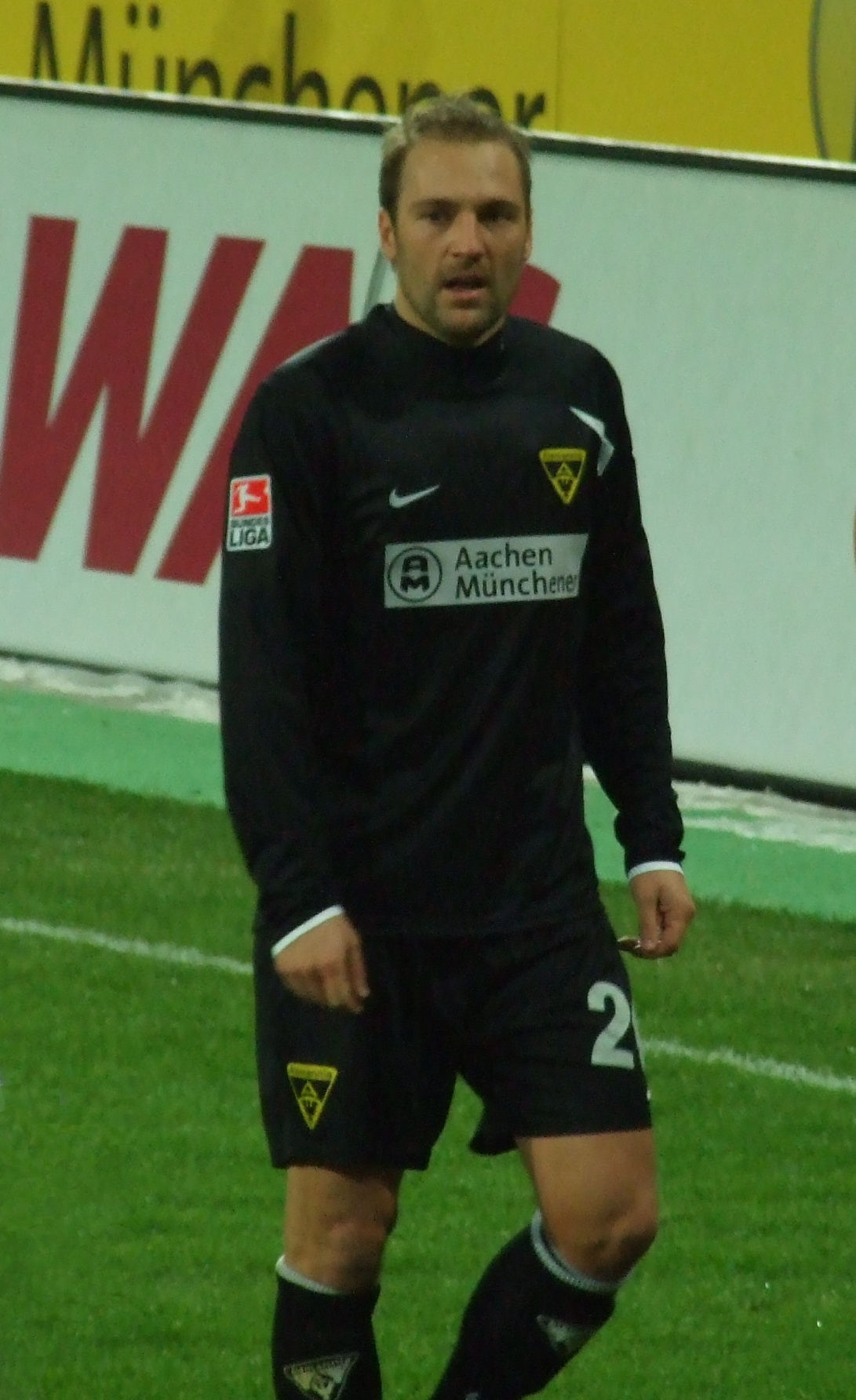
- Milchraum in 2010

Personal information
- Date of birth: 26 May 1984 (age 42)
- Place of birth: Stuttgart, West Germany
- Height: 1.75 m (5 ft 9 in)
- Position: Midfielder

Team information
- Current team: Stuttgarter Kickers

Youth career
- 1988–2000: SV Vaihingen
- 2000–2002: Stuttgarter Kickers

Senior career*
Years	Team	Apps	(Gls)
2002–2004	Stuttgarter Kickers	45	(4)
2004–2007	1860 Munich	66	(7)
2007–2010	Alemannia Aachen	76	(10)
2010–2011	Erzgebirge Aue	6	(0)
2011–2012	Karlsruher SC	9	(0)
2012–2013	FC Zestafoni	17	(1)
2013	Dinamo Tbilisi	5	(0)
2013–2015	Stuttgarter Kickers	9	(0)
2014	→ Carl Zeiss Jena (loan)	12	(2)
Total		245	(24)

International career
2002–2003	Germany U19	8	(1)
2004	Germany U21	2	(0)
- * Club domestic league appearances and goals

Patrick Milchraum (born 26 May 1984) is a German former professional footballer who played as a midfielder.

== Career ==
Milchraum was born in Stuttgart.

On 30 May 2005, he scored the first official goal at the Allianz Arena football stadium during the opening match against 1. FC Nürnberg. His club, TSV 1860 Munich, won the match 3–2.

== Honours ==
Dinamo Tbilisi

- Georgian Premier League: 2012–13
