= Mustafa Parmak =

Turkish/German retired footballer (born 1982)

Personal information
- Date of birth: 19 May 1982 (age 44)
- Place of birth: Stuttgart, Germany
- Height: 1.73 m (5 ft 8 in)
- Position: Midfielder

Youth career
- VfR Cannstatt
- –1995: TSV Stuttgart-Münster
- 1995–2000: Stuttgarter Kickers

Senior career*
Years	Team	Apps	(Gls)
2000–2002	Stuttgarter Kickers II	3	(0)
2002–2004	SpVgg Ludwigsburg	50	(13)
2004–2008	Stuttgarter Kickers	101	(19)
2005–2006	Stuttgarter Kickers II	4	(2)
2008	TuS Koblenz	3	(0)
2009	Stuttgarter Kickers	8	(0)
2009	Stuttgarter Kickers II	1	(0)
2009–2015	SpVgg Ludwigsburg		
2015–2016	SpVgg Cannstatt	1	(1)
2016–2018	TSV Stuttgart-Münster	11	(3)
Total		182	(38)
- * Club domestic league appearances and goals

Mustafa Parmak (born 19 May 1982) is a Turkish/German retired footballer, who mostly played for the German club Stuttgarter Kickers as a midfielder.
