= Paul Grischok =

Polish-German footballer

Personal information
- Date of birth: 26 February 1986 (age 40)
- Place of birth: Kędzierzyn-Koźle, Poland
- Height: 1.82 m (6 ft 0 in)
- Position: Midfielder

Youth career
- –2007: SV Wermelskirchen

Senior career*
Years	Team	Apps	(Gls)
2007–2009	Bayer Leverkusen II	30	(0)
2009–2010	Servette	11	(1)
2010–2011	Widzew Łódź	13	(0)
2011–2012	Olimpia Grudziądz	36	(5)
2013	Etar 1924	2	(0)
2013–2014	Stuttgarter Kickers	4	(0)
2014	BFC Dynamo	7	(5)
2014–2025	Berliner AK	24	(5)
2015	Chojniczanka Chojnice	11	(0)
2016	Pelikan Łowicz	11	(2)
Total		149	(18)
- * Club domestic league appearances and goals

Paul Grischok (German: Paul Grischok; born 26 February 1986) is a Polish-German former professional footballer who played as a midfielder.

== Career ==
In August 2010, he joined Polish club Widzew Łódź. Following stints with further clubs in Poland, Bulgaria and with Stuttgarter Kickers he joined BFC in February 2014. Coming on as a substitute he scored his first goal for the wine-reds in a match against the Under 23 team of FC Hansa Rostock on 23 March 2014.
