= Mijo Tunjić =

Dutch footballer

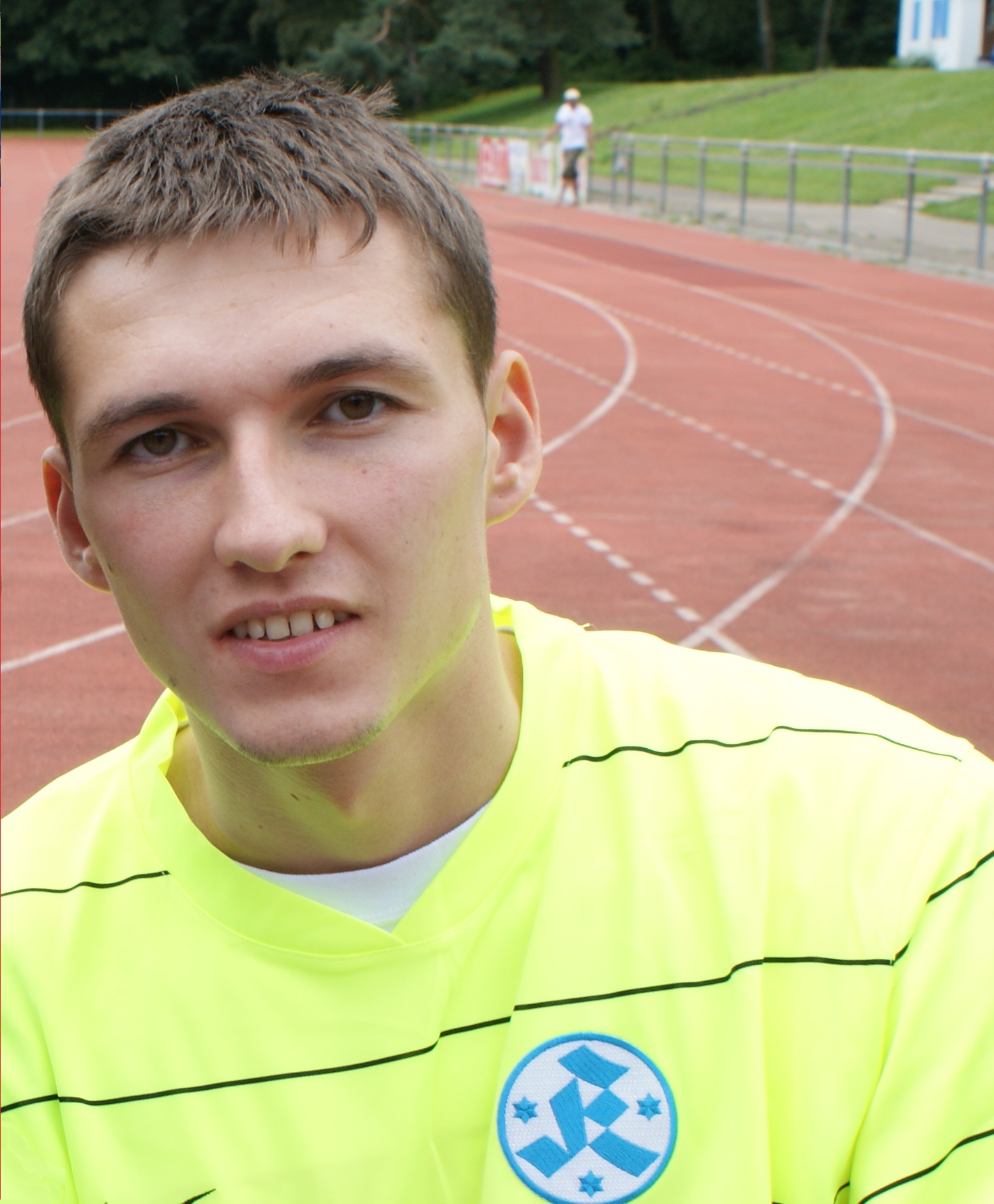
- Tunjić with Stuttgarter Kickers in 2009

Personal information
- Date of birth: 24 February 1988 (age 38)
- Place of birth: Gradačac, Yugoslavia
- Height: 1.86 m (6 ft 1 in)
- Position: Forward

Senior career*
Years	Team	Apps	(Gls)
2008–2010	Stuttgarter Kickers	38	(21)
2010–2012	SpVgg Unterhaching	63	(17)
2012–2014	Rot-Weiss Erfurt	60	(8)
2014–2016	SV Elversberg	67	(38)
2016–2022	Stuttgarter Kickers	167	(94)
2022–2024	1. Göppinger SV	48	(18)
- * Club domestic league appearances and goals as of 1 July 2024

Mijo Tunjić (born 24 February 1988) is a Dutch professional footballer who plays as a forward.

== Personal life ==
He is of Bosnian Croat descent.
