= Mirnes Mešić =

Bosnian-Herzegovinian footballer

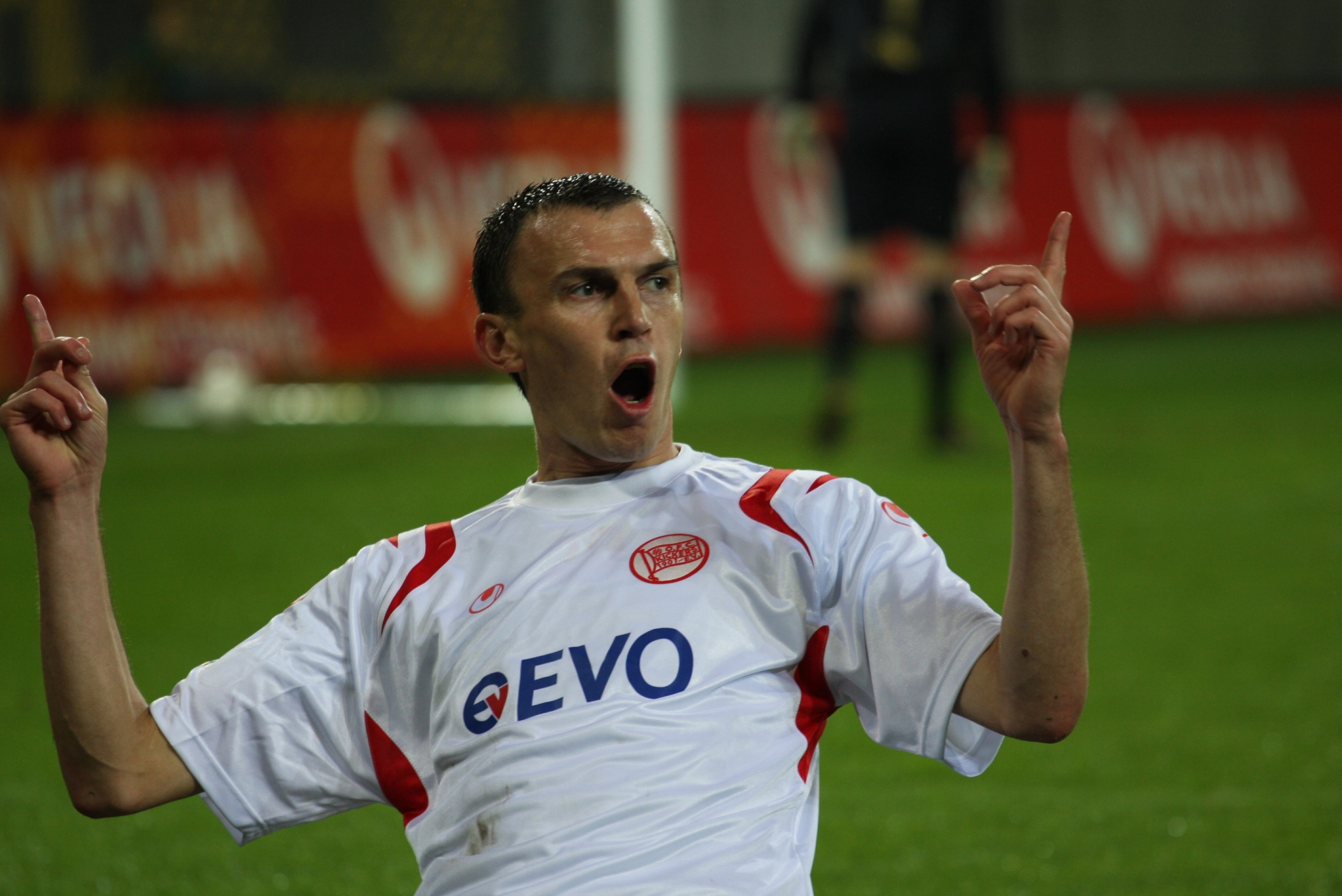
- Mešić with Kickers Offenbach

Personal information
- Date of birth: 16 March 1978 (age 48)
- Place of birth: Doboj, Yugoslavia
- Height: 1.80 m (5 ft 11 in)
- Position: Striker

Youth career
- TSV Hauersbronn

Senior career*
Years	Team	Apps	(Gls)
1996–1998	VfB Stuttgart (A)	49	(5)
1998–2003	SpVgg Ludwigsburg	139	(54)
2003–2007	Stuttgarter Kickers	118	(45)
2007	1899 Hoffenheim	15	(7)
2007–2008	SC Freiburg	16	(2)
2008–2011	Kickers Offenbach	77	(17)
Total		414	(130)
- * Club domestic league appearances and goals

Mirnes Mešić (born 16 March 1978) is a Bosnian-Herzegovinian former professional footballer who played as a striker. He played for Kickers Offenbach, Stuttgarter Kickers, TSG Hoffenheim and SC Freiburg.
