= Marco Calamita =

Italian footballer

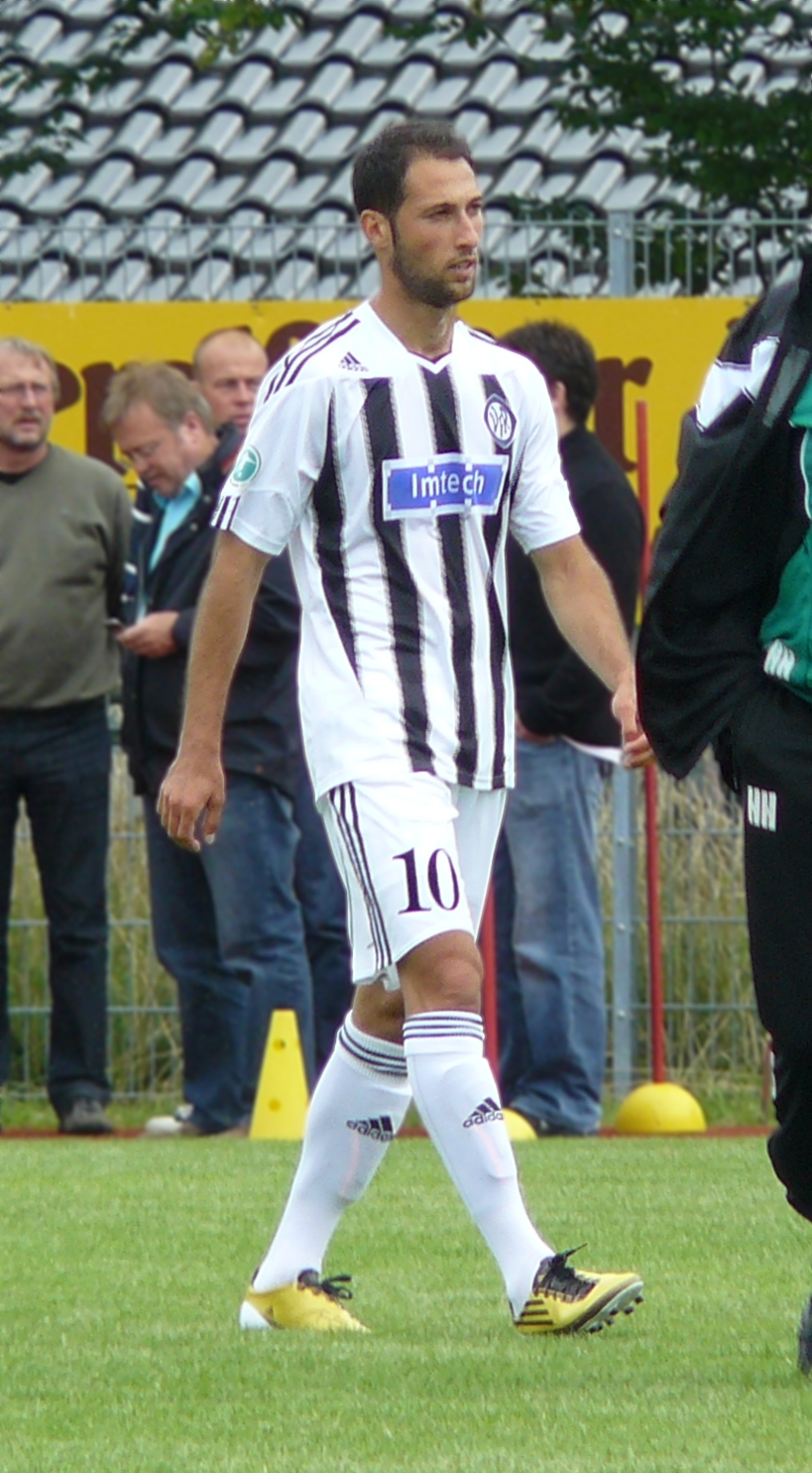
- Calamita in 2011.

Personal information
- Date of birth: 22 March 1983 (age 43)
- Place of birth: Bitonto or Bari, Italy
- Height: 1.80 m (5 ft 11 in)
- Position: Striker

Youth career
- VfB Stuttgart

Senior career*
Years	Team	Apps	(Gls)
2003	Stuttgarter Kickers II	18	(3)
2003–2004	SC Verl	32	(17)
2004–2006	SV Elversberg	59	(7)
2006	1. FC Kaiserslautern II	16	(0)
2007	SV Wehen Wiesbaden	0	(0)
2007–2008	SC Pfullendorf	32	(13)
2008–2009	SV Wacker Burghausen	38	(11)
2009–2011	Eintracht Braunschweig	51	(11)
2010–2011	→ Eintracht Braunschweig II	9	(7)
2011–2013	VfR Aalen	21	(1)
2013–2016	Stuttgarter Kickers	45	(7)
- * Club domestic league appearances and goals as of 12 April 2015

Marco Calamita (born 22 March 1983) is an ex Italian footballer who currently is a football manager.

== Biography ==
=== Early years ===
Marco Calamita was born in Bitonto, near Bari in the Apulia region. At age eight he was then emigrated with his parents from Italy and went to Germany, where the family settled in Fellbach in Swabia in Baden-Württemberg near Stuttgart. In Fellbach he also joined a football club, in the case of Calamita the SV Fellbach and the detour Stuttgarter Kickers he went to VfB Stuttgart.

=== International career ===
Shortly after his 18th birthday he received from Uli Stielike an invitation to a seminar of the U-18 national team in Germany, however, no career resulted in the junior national teams of Germany, because he did not want to apply for a German passport.
