= Ronny Garbuschewski =

German footballer (born 1986)

Personal information
- Date of birth: 23 February 1986 (age 40)
- Place of birth: Grimma, Bezirk Leipzig, East Germany
- Height: 1.77 m (5 ft 10 in)
- Position: Midfielder

Youth career
- FSV Kitzscher
- –2004: Sachsen Leipzig

Senior career*
Years	Team	Apps	(Gls)
2004–2009	Sachsen Leipzig	101	(9)
2009–2012	Chemnitzer FC	104	(27)
2012–2013	Fortuna Düsseldorf	7	(0)
2012–2013	Fortuna Düsseldorf II	8	(4)
2013–2015	Chemnitzer FC	35	(7)
2015–2016	Energie Cottbus	18	(2)
2016–2017	Hansa Rostock	27	(0)
2017–2018	FSV Zwickau	11	(1)
2018–2021	BFC Dynamo	37	(9)
2021–2022	Greifswalder FC	8	(1)
Total		356	(60)
- * Club domestic league appearances and goals

Ronny Garbuschewski (born 23 February 1986) is a German former professional footballer who played as a midfielder.

== Career ==
In June 2013, Garbuschewski returned to Chemnitzer FC after spending only one season with Fortuna Düsseldorf.
