= Kevin Dicklhuber =

German footballer (born 1989)

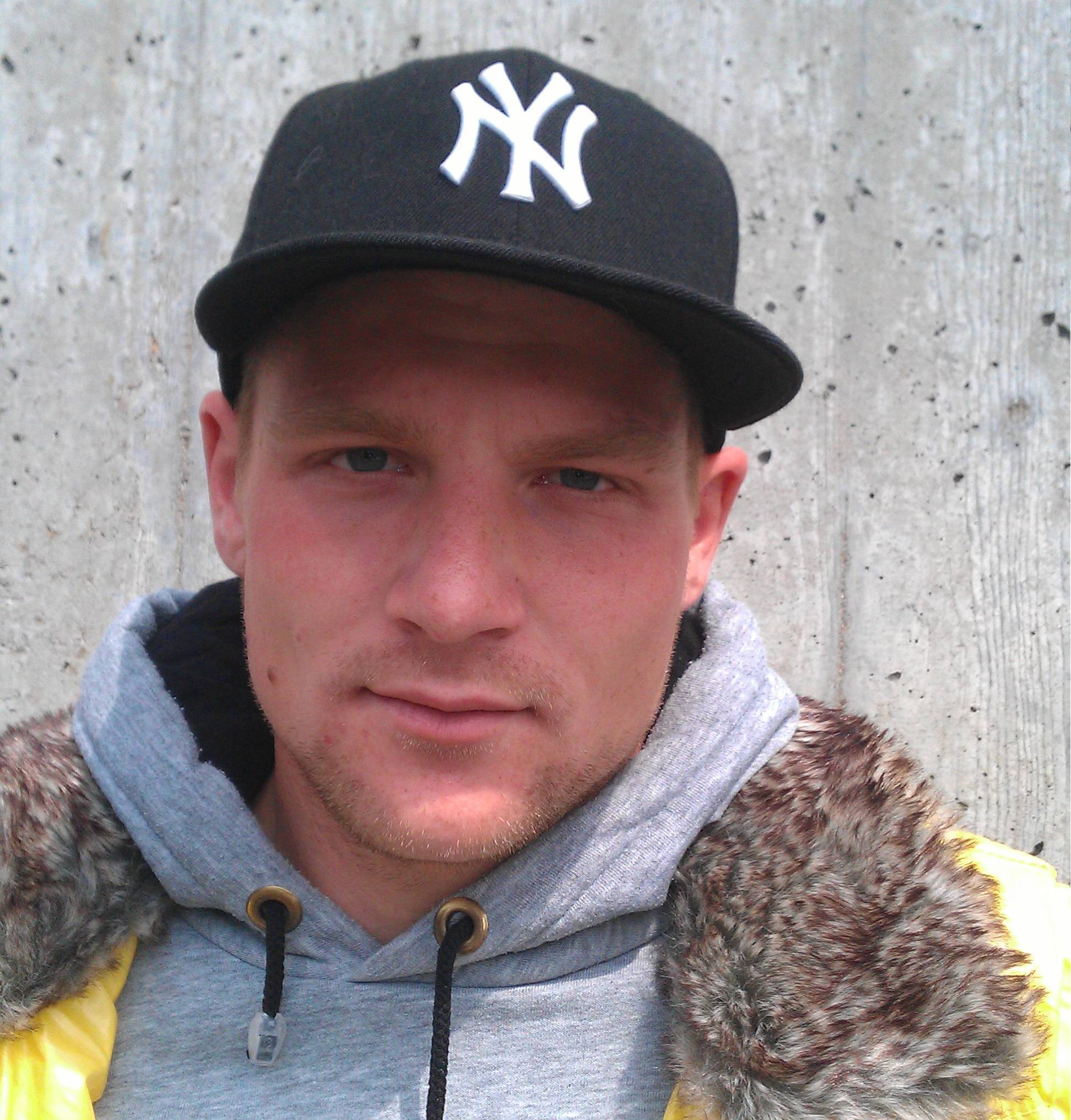
- Kevin Dickelhuber can play as a striker, right midfielder and as a center attacive midfielder. Dickelhuber has scored 25 goals to date in the 5th tier of German football. Furthermore, he has 6 assists, and he is considered one of the best players in the Oberliga Baden-Württemberg (the 5th division of football in the state of Baden-Württemberg).

Personal information
- Full name: Kevin Dickelhuber
- Date of birth: 6 March 1989 (age 37)
- Place of birth: Albstadt, West Germany
- Height: 1.85 m (6 ft 1 in)
- Position: Left winger

Team information
- Current team: 1. Göppinger SV

Youth career
- FC Tailfingen
- –2011: FC 07 Albstadt

Senior career*
Years	Team	Apps	(Gls)
2011–2012	SC Pfullendorf	29	(5)
2012–2014	Stuttgarter Kickers II	11	(1)
2012–2014	Stuttgarter Kickers	30	(3)
2014–2016	FC 07 Albstadt	23	(12)
2016–2021	1. Göppinger SV	125	(74)
2021–2024	Stuttgarter Kickers	115	(61)
2025–	1. Göppinger SV	0	(0)
- * Club domestic league appearances and goals as of 13 January 2025

Kevin Dicklhuber (born 6 March 1989) is a German footballer who plays for 1. Göppinger SV.

== Career ==
=== SC Pfullendorf ===
Kevin Diclehuber's first recorded season was the 2011/12 season, in which he played in the Regionalliga Süd, for SC Pfullendorf, scoring 5 goals and doing 1 assist, in 29 appearances.

=== Stuttgarter Kickers ===
In the 2012/13 season, Kevin Dickelhuber played games for the first team of Stuttgarter Kickers and some games for the second team. The first team was in the 3 Liga, in which he had 15 appearances and scored 1 goal and did 2 assists. He had 9 appearances for the second team of Stuttgarter Kickers playing in the Oberliga. Kevin Dickelhuber played previously in the 3rd division in the season 2013/14 with Stuttgarter Kickers, he scored 2 goals and did 2 assist in 16 appearances for the club.

=== FC 07 Albstadt ===
In the 2014/15 season, Kevin Dickelhuber played in the Verbandsliga Württemberg (6th tier of German football) in which 2 appearances were recorded for FC 07 Albstadt. In the 2015/16 season, Dickelhuber played in the Verbandsliga Württemberg for FC 07 Albstadt, in 21 games, he scored 12 goals and no assists were recorded.

=== Göppinger SV ===
The following season, 2016/17, he joined 1. Göppinger SV playing in the Oberliga Baden-Württemberg, in 33 appearances for the club, he scored 10 goals and had 5 assists. In the 2017/18 season, Kevin Dickelhuber stayed at 1.Göppinger SV playing in the Oberliga Baden-Württemberg, in 32 appearances he scored 10 goals and had 7 assists. In the 2018/19 season, his career at Göppingen continued, playing in the Oberliga, he scored 28 goals and had 5 assists in 31 appearances. The following season, (the 2019/20 season) was interrupted halfway through the season due to the COVID-19 pandemic, therefore he only had 17 appearances and scored 11 goals with 4 assists for 1. Göppinger SV in the Oberliga Baden-Württemberg. In the 2020/2021 season, Dickelhuber had 12 appearances for Göppingen in which he scored 15 goals and had 2 assists in the Oberliga Baden-Württemberg.

=== Stuttgarter Kickers ===
In the 2021/22 season, Dickelhuber transferred to the Stuttgarter Kickers, in that season he had 37 appearances in which he scored 20 goals and had 19 assists. The current season (2022/23) Dickelhuber, has 25 goals and 6 assist in 30 games with 3 more games left until the end of the season. Through the help of Dickelhuber as the capitain, Kickers secured promotion back to the regionalliga on the 6th of May 2023 (4 match day's before the last season's game. Furthermore, Stuttgarter Kickers are now also in the final of the WFV Pokal, if Stuttgarter Kickers turn out to be victorious and win the trophy, it will be their entry for the DFB Pokal. The Stuttgarter Kickers fans see Dickelhuber as such an important part of this promotion and season, that they rewarded him with a tifo of him before their promotion game against their rivals, SSV Reutlingen.

=== Göppinger SV ===
On 13 January 2025, Dicklhuber joined 1. Göppinger SV again.
