= Patrick Auracher =

German footballer

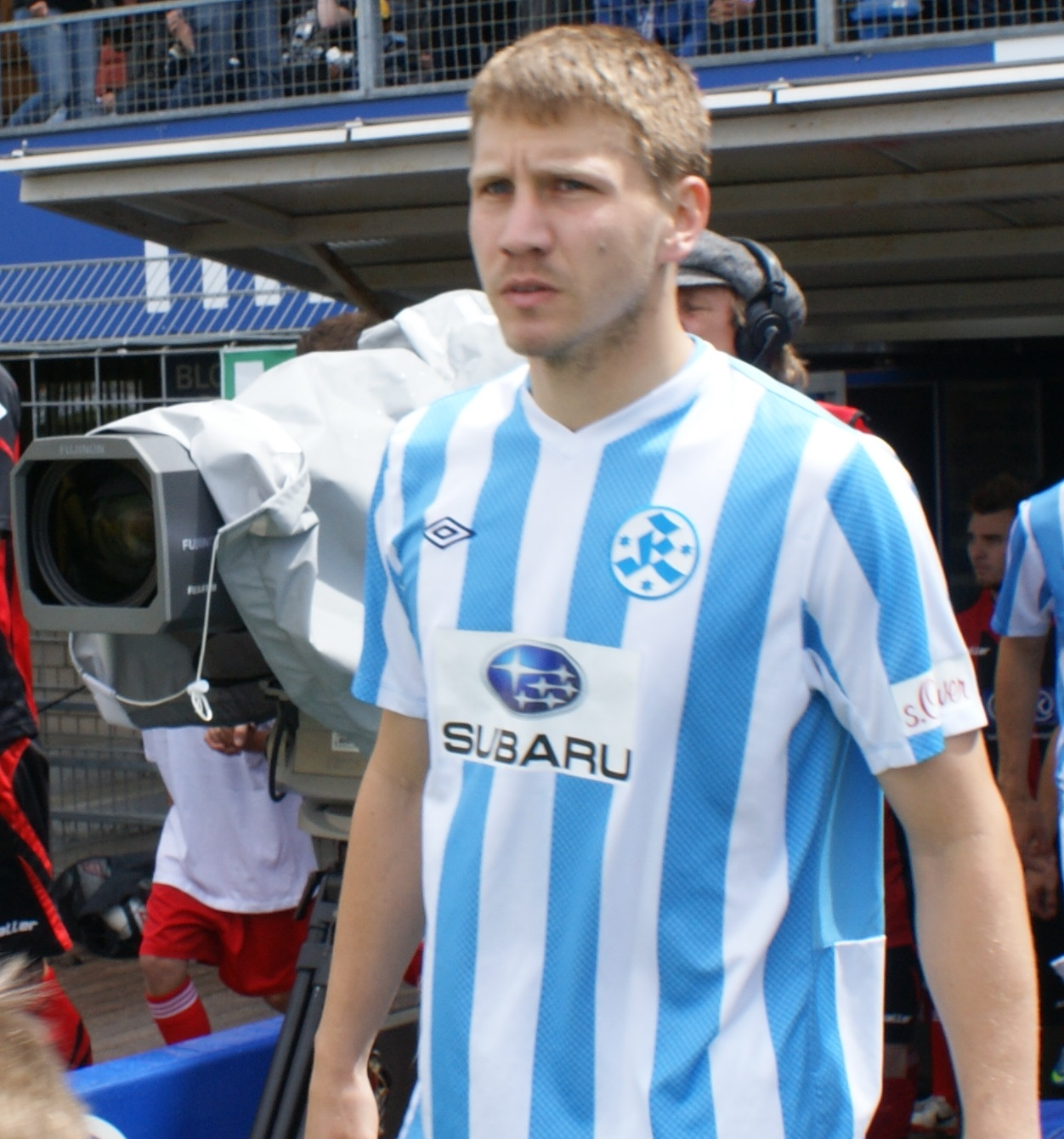

Personal information
- Date of birth: January 4, 1990 (age 36)
- Place of birth: Stuttgart, Germany
- Height: 1.84 m (6 ft 0 in)
- Position: Centre-back

Team information
- Current team: TSV Essingen (player-assistant)
- Number: 41

Youth career
- –2004: ASV Botnang
- 2004–2008: Stuttgarter Kickers

Senior career*
Years	Team	Apps	(Gls)
2008–2011	Stuttgarter Kickers II	33	(4)
2009–2014	Stuttgarter Kickers	101	(1)
2014–2015	Holstein Kiel	8	(0)
2015–2018	Wormatia Worms	90	(9)
2018–2020	Stuttgarter Kickers	51	(4)
2020–	TSV Essingen	55	(5)

Managerial career
- FC Mögglingen Women (assistant)
- FC Mögglingen Women
- 2022–: TSV Essingen (player-assistant)
- * Club domestic league appearances and goals as of 17:36, 28 February 2023 (UTC)

Patrick Auracher (born January 4, 1990) is a German footballer who plays for TSV Essingen.
