= Andreas Krause (footballer, born 1967) =

German footballer and poker player (born 1967)

Personal information
- Date of birth: 16 November 1967 (age 58)
- Height: 1.81 m (5 ft 11 1/2 in)
- Position: Defender

Senior career*
Years	Team	Apps	(Gls)
1990–1993	Stuttgarter Kickers	10	(0)
1993–1994	1. FC Pforzheim	2	(0)
Total		12	(0)
- * Club domestic league appearances and goals

Andreas "Andy" Krause (born 16 November 1967) is a German former football player and current poker player. He played professionally for the Stuttgarter Kickers from 1990 to 1993, including two caps during a time when the club was in the Bundesliga, and then for 1. FC Pforzheim. He now competes in the World Series of Poker and lives in Weinsberg. He has live tournament winnings of $2,400,000.
