= Wolfgang Schüler =

German footballer (1958–2024)

Personal information
- Date of birth: 17 February 1958
- Place of birth: Freiburg, Baden-Württemberg, West Germany
- Date of death: 24 April 2024 (aged 66)
- Height: 1.81 m (5 ft 11 in)
- Position(s): Striker, midfielder

Senior career*
Years	Team	Apps	(Gls)
–1978	Eintracht Freiburg		
1978–1979	Karlsruher SC	32	(4)
1979–1980	SC Freiburg	37	(14)
1980–1982	Karlsruher SC	53	(9)
1982–1983	Darmstadt 98	22	(8)
1983–1984	Karlsruher SC	36	(19)
1984–1986	Borussia Dortmund	54	(10)
1986–1988	Blau-Weiß Berlin	56	(19)
1988–1990	Stuttgarter Kickers	60	(27)
1990–1993	1. FC Saarbrücken	65	(18)
- *Club domestic league appearances and goals

Wolfgang Schüler (17 February 1958 – 24 April 2024) was a German professional footballer who played as a striker or midfielder.

Schüler played combined 414 matches in the Bundesliga and 2. Bundesliga. He died on 24 April 2024, at the age of 66.
