= Silvinho (footballer, born 1974) =

Brazilian footballer

Personal information
- Full name: Sílvio Antônio
- Date of birth: 26 May 1974 (age 52)
- Place of birth: Araraquara, Brazil
- Height: 1.78 m (5 ft 10 in)
- Position: Striker

Senior career*
Years	Team	Apps	(Gls)
1992–1995	Ferroviária		
1996	União São João		
1996	Comercial FC		
1997	SE Matonense		
1997–1998	Atlético Paranaense	17	(2)
1998	Grêmio Foot-Ball Porto Alegrense		
1999	AD São Caetano		
1999	Atlético Paranaense		
1999–2000	FC Wil 1900		
2000	Ituano Futebol Clube		
2000–2001	Stuttgarter Kickers	25	(6)
2001	Clube 15 de Novembro		
2002	Ituano Futebol Clube		
2003	Club Jorge Wilstermann		
2003	Botafogo		
2004	Avaí Futebol Clube		
2005	EC Noroeste		
2006	Osvaldo Cruz Futebol Clube		
- * Club domestic league appearances and goals as of June 23, 2014 ‡ National team caps and goals as of June 23, 2014

Sílvio Antônio (born 26 May 1974), known as Silvinho, is a Brazilian retired footballer who played as a forward.

== Career ==
After scoring five goals with Sociedade Esportiva Matonense as the club won the 1997 Campeonato Paulista Série A2, Silvinho joined Clube Atlético Paranaense for the 1997 Campeonato Brasileiro Série A. He scored on his debut, a 2–1 win over Goiás. Silvinho returned to Atlético-PR to play in the 1999 Campeonato Paranaense.
