= Axel Dünnwald-Metzler =

German footballer

Personal information
- Full name: Axel Dünnwald-Metzler
- Date of birth: 9 December 1939
- Place of birth: Stuttgart, Germany
- Date of death: 6 April 2004 (aged 64)
- Place of death: Stuttgart, Germany
- Position: Midfielder

Youth career
- 1949–1955: Stuttgarter Kickers
- 1955–1956: VfB Stuttgart
- 1956–1958: Stuttgarter Kickers

Senior career*
Years	Team	Apps	(Gls)
1958–1962	Stuttgarter Kickers	62	(3)
- * Club domestic league appearances and goals

Axel Dünnwald-Metzler (9 December 1939 in Stuttgart – 6 April 2004 same place) was a German footballer and the honorary president of Stuttgarter Kickers. He was the president of the kickers from May 1979 till July 2003. He was succeeded by 1941 born Hans Kullen. He died at the age of 64 from lung cancer.
