= 2014–15 Stuttgarter Kickers season =

Stuttgarter Kickers
2014–15 season
- Chairman: Rainer Lorz
- Manager: Horst Steffen
- Stadium: Stadion an der Kreuzeiche, Reutlingen, BW; Gazi-Stadion auf der Waldau, Stuttgart, BW
- 3. Liga: 4th
- DFB-Pokal: Round 1
- Württemberg Cup: Quarterfinals
- Top goalscorer: League: Stein & Marchese (7); All: Stein, Marchese & Soriano (7)
- Highest home attendance: 8.650 vs. MSV Duisburg, 7 March 2015
- Lowest home attendance: 2.200 vs. SpVgg Unterhaching, 23 September 2014
- Average home league attendance: 4.420
| Home colours | Away colours | Third colours |

The 2014–15 Stuttgarter Kickers season is the 115th season in the club's football history. In 3. Liga the club plays in the 3. Liga, the third tier of German football. The club also plays in the DFB-Pokal, it is the club's first season back in the DFB-Pokal since 2006. The club also takes part in the 2014–15 edition of the Württemberg Cup.

== Background ==
=== Transfers & contracts ===
==== In ====
| No. | Pos. | Nat. | Name | Age | EU | Moving from | Type | Transfer Window | Contract ends | Transfer fee | Ref. |
|---|---|---|---|---|---|---|---|---|---|---|---|
| 1 | GK | (Germany) | Korbinian Müller | 23 | Yes | SpVgg Unterhaching | Released | Summer | 2016 | Free | |
| 4 | DF | (Germany) | Hendrik Starostzik | 23 | Yes | VfL Bochum II | End of contract | Summer | 2016 | Free | |
| 18 | MF | (Germany) | Marco Gaiser | 21 | Yes | Junior Team | Promoted | Summer | 2016 | n/a | |
| 20 | MF | (Kosovo) | Besar Halimi | 19 | No | VfB Stuttgart II | End of contract | Summer | 2015 | Free | |
| 23 | MF | (Germany) | Daniel Kaiser | 23 | Yes | Junior Team | Promoted | Summer | 2015 | n/a | |
| 32 | GK | (Germany) | Tobias Trautner | 19 | Yes | Junior Team | Promoted | Summer | 2015 | n/a | |
| 14 | MF | (Italy) | Umberto Tedesco | 22 | Yes | SC Freiburg II | End of contract | Summer | 2015 | Free | |
| 37 | FW | (Germany) | Manuel Fischer | 25 | Yes | SG Sonnenhof Großaspach | Released | Winter | 2015 | Free | |
| 28 | MF | (Germany) | Bentley Baxter Bahn | 22 | Yes | FC St. Pauli | Released | Winter | 2017 | Free | |

==== Out ====
| No. | Pos. | Nat. | Name | Age | EU | Moving to | Type | Transfer Window | Transfer fee | Ref. |
|---|---|---|---|---|---|---|---|---|---|---|
| 1 | GK | (Germany) | Daniel Wagner | 27 | Yes | (Germany) TSV Plattenhardt | End of contract | Summer | Free | |
| 3 | DF | (Germany) | Patrick Auracher | 24 | Yes | (Germany) Holstein Kiel | End of contract | Summer | Free | |
| 5 | DF | (Germany) | Julian Leist | 26 | Yes | (Germany) SG Sonnenhof Großaspach | Released | Summer | Free | |
| 7 | MF | (Slovenia) | Marcel Ivanusa | 27 | Yes | (Germany) Stuttgarter Kickers II (Assistant coach) | Retired | Summer | n/a | |
| 11 | FW | (France) | Karim Rouani | 32 | Yes | | End of contract | Summer | Free | |
| 18 | MF | (Germany) | Kevin Dicklhuber | 25 | Yes | (Germany) FC Albstadt 07 | End of contract | Summer | Free | |
| 19 | DF | (Germany) | Kai-Bastian Evers | 24 | Yes | (Germany) SV Rödinghausen | End of contract | Summer | Free | |
| 24 | MF | (Turkey) | Mahir Savranlıoğlu | 27 | No | (Germany) SGV Freiberg | End of contract | Summer | Free | |
| 25 | FW | (Serbia) | Nermin Ibrahimović | 24 | No | (Germany) VfR Mannheim | End of contract | Summer | Free | |
| 28 | DF | (Germany) | Pascal Schmidt | 21 | Yes | (Canada) Simon Fraser Clan | End of contract | Summer | Free | |
| 29 | MF | (Germany) | Marcos Alvarez | 22 | Yes | (Germany) VfL Osnabrück | End of contract | Summer | Free | |
| 31 | MF | (Germany) | Patrick Milchraum | 30 | Yes | (Germany) Stuttgarter Kickers II | Degraded | Summer | n/a | |
| 38 | GK | (Germany) | Markus Krauss | 26 | Yes | (Germany) SV Waldhof Mannheim | End of contract | Summer | Free | |
| 33 | FW | (Germany) | Shkemb Miftari | 21 | Yes | (Germany) SV Waldhof Mannheim | Released | Winter | Free | |

==== Contracts ====
| No. | Player | Status | Contract length | Expiry date | Ref. |
|---|---|---|---|---|---|
| 20 | Besar Halimi | Transfer | 1 year | 30 June 2015 | |
| 4 | Hendrik Starostzik | Transfer | 2 years | 30 June 2016 | |
| 18 | Marco Gaiser | Transfer | 2 years | 30 June 2016 | |
| 23 | Daniel Kaiser | Transfer | 1 year | 30 June 2015 | |
| 1 | Korbinian Müller | Transfer | 2 years | 30 June 2016 | |
| 2 | Maximilian Hoffmann | Extension | 1 year | 30 June 2015 | |
| 14 | Umberto Tedesco | Transfer | 1 year | 30 June 2015 | |
| 20 | Besar Halimi | Extension | 2 years | 30 June 2016 | |
| 37 | Manuel Fischer | Transfer | 1 year | 30 June 2016 | |
| 28 | Bentley Baxter Bahn | Transfer | 2 years | 30 June 2017 | |
| 27 | Fabian Baumgärtel | Extension | 1 year | 30 June 2016 | |
| 21 | Marc Stein | Extension | 2 years | 30 June 2017 | |
| 23 | Daniel Kaiser | Extension | 1 year | 30 June 2016 | |
| 9 | Elia Soriano | Extension | 1 year | 30 June 2016 | |

== Matches ==
=== Legend ===
Win Draw Loss Postponed

=== Friendly matches ===
| Date | Time^{1} | Stadium | City | Opponent | Result^{2} | Attendance | Goalscorers | | Source |
| Date | Time^{1} | Stadium | City | Opponent | Result^{2} | Attendance | Stuttgarter Kickers | Opponent | Source |
Pre–season friendlies
| 21 June 2014 | 15:00 | Appenbergsportplatz | Mönsheim, Germany | FC Augsburg II | 3–0 | 200 | Calamita 13'; Soriano 29'; Miftari 75' | — | |
| 25 June 2014 | 18:30 | Reinhold Fleckenstein Stadion | Nagold, Germany | VfL Nagold | 4–1 | 600 | Alonso 41'; Badiane 45'; Cekić 58'; Miftari 77' | Schachtschneider 36' (pen.) | |
| 29 June 2014 | 16:00 | Rasenplatz Möhringen | Stuttgart, Germany | Würzburger Kickers | 1–1 | 600 | Stein 89' | Shapourzadeh 28' | |
| 5 July 2014 | 17:00 | Sportanlage Seefeld | Lachen, Switzerland | FC Zürich | 1–2 | 923 | Soriano 23' | Schönbächler 15'; Rodríguez 80' | |
| 6 July 2014 | 16:00 | Sportgelände Im Gaiern | Weil im Schönbuch, Germany | SpVgg Weil im Schönbuch | 9–0 | 500 | Koch 12'; Kaiser 19', 44'; Gerster 33'; Miftari 45'; Vidovic 46', 85'; Ivan 56'; Edwini-Bonsu 71' | — | |
| 8 July 2014 | 18:00 | Sportanlage Güttingersreuti | Weinfelden, Switzerland | FC St. Gallen | 1–3 | 600 | Miftari 32' | Tréand 12'; Čavušević 39'; Karanović 86' | |
| 12 July 2014 | 16:00 | Appenbergsportplatz | Mönsheim, Germany | TSG Hoffenheim II | 1–1 | | Soriano 36' | Schwadorf 86' | |
| 19 July 2014 | 14:00 | Rasenplatz Eppenbrunn | Eppenbrunn, Germany | SV Eintracht Trier | 2–3 | | Stein 8'; Soriano 74' | Püttmann 32'; Garnier 76'; Pozder 90' | |
| 20 July 2014 | 11:00 | Rasenplatz TV Zuffenhausen | Stuttgart, Germany | TV Zuffenhausen | 7–0 | | Edwini-Bonsu 7'; Miftari 13', 37', 54', 58'; Stein 19'; Badiane 69' | — | |
Mid–season friendlies
| 10 September 2014 | 18:00 | Ammerstadion | Herrenberg, Germany | Gäu Auswahl | 3–0 | 1,400 | Marchese 83'; Soriano 85'; Badiane 89' | — | |
| 15 October 2014 | 18:30 | Ernwiesenstadion | Mössingen, Germany | Stadtauswahl Mössingen | 6–0 | 500 | Baumgärtel 3'; Halimi 10'; Soriano 42'; Miftari 70', 73'; Kaiser 88' | — | |
| 10 January 2015 | 14:00 | Walter-Reinhard-Stadion | Sandhausen, Germany | SV Sandhausen | 2–1 | 300 | Calamita 14', 21' | Gartler 59' | |
| 14 January 2015 | 14:00 | ADM Sportpark | Stuttgart, Germany | VfR Aalen | 3–2 | | Yarchuk 45'; Fischer 77', 85' | Feick 14'; Klauß 69' | |
| 18 January 2015 | 18:00 | Teneriffa Top Training T3 | Adeje, Spain | UD Guargacho | 12–0 | 100 | Fischer 17'; G. Müller 18', 31'; Halimi 20'; Baumgärtel 40'; Bahn 42'; Engelbrecht 63', 79', 82'; Kaiser 74'; Edwini-Bonsu 86' unknown 84' (o.g.) | — | |
| 21 January 2015 | 19:00 | Teneriffa Top Training T3 | Adeje, Spain | CD San Isidro | 8–1 | 63 | Calamita 12'; Halimi 13'; Ivan 16', 48'; Kaiser 39'; Fischer 65', 81'; G. Müller 86' | unknown 55' | |
| 25 January 2015 | 14:00 | Sportpark Heiningen | Heiningen, Germany | SSV Jahn Regensburg | 4–2 | 300 | Badiane 19'; Halimi 25'; Fischer 29'; Engelbrecht 83' | Geipl 42'; Öztürk 44' | |
| 6 February 2015 | 18:00 | Sportanlage Rheinau | Mannheim, Germany | SV Waldhof Mannheim | 0–4 | | — | Mesfin-Mulugeta 54'; Miftari 62'; Förster 85'; Tsoumou 88' | |
| 27 March 2015 | 14:00 | Stadion an der Jesinger Allee | Kirchheim unter Teck, Germany | 1. FC Heidenheim | 1–2 | 100 | Engelbrecht 44' | Mayer 3'; Janzer 50' | |

- 1. Times in Central European Time/Central European Summer Time
- 2. Kickers goals listed first.

=== 3. Liga ===
==== League fixtures and results ====
| MD | Date KO | Venue | Opponent | Res. F–A | Att. | Goalscorers and disciplined players | | Table | | | Ref. |
| MD | Date KO | Venue | Opponent | Res. F–A | Att. | Stuttgarter Kickers | Opponent | Pos. | Pts. | GD | Ref. |
|---|---|---|---|---|---|---|---|---|---|---|---|
| 1 | 26 July; 14:00 | A | SV Wehen Wiesbaden | 1–2 | 2.591 | Fennell 8' (yellow card) 41'; Baumgärtel (yellow card) 43' | Kotzke (yellow card) 38'; Jänicke 50'; Riemann (yellow card) 65' (goal) 67' | 14 | 0 | −1 | |
| 2 | 2 August; 14:00 | H | SSV Jahn Regensburg | 3–1 | 2.765 | Stein 26'; Badiane 28'; Braun 81' (yellow card) 90+1'; Kaiser (yellow card) 84'; Baumgärtel (yellow card) 85' | Aosman 10' (yellow card) 90+1'; Kurz (yellow card) 24'; Güntner (yellow card) 62'; Steininger (yellow card) 67'; Windmüller (yellow card) 68'; Nachreiner (yellow card) 83' | 9 | +1 | 3 | |
| 3 | 5 August; 19:00 | A | SG Sonnenhof Großaspach | 1–1 | 6.415 | Fennell (yellow card) 38'; Soriano 41'; Halimi (yellow card) 50' | Jüllich (yellow card) 10'; Skarlatidis (yellow card) 28'; Rizzi 45'; Gehring (yellow card) 85'; Rühle (yellow card) 89' | 8 | +1 | 4 | |
| 4 | 9 August; 14:00 | H | 1. FSV Mainz 05 II | 2–0 | 2.260 | G. Müller 61'; Edwini-Bonsu 80' | F. Müller (yellow card) 60' | 6 | +3 | 7 | |
| 5 | 23 August; 14:00 | A | Hallescher FC | 2–1 | 5.390 | G. Müller 9' (yellow card) 45'; Braun (yellow card) 29'; Marchese 47' (pen.); Soriano (yellow card) 80'; K. Müller (yellow card) 87' | Pfeffer 6' (yellow card) 45'; Mouaya (yellow card) 15'; Kruse (yellow card) 19'; Jansen (yellow card) 37' | 4 | +4 | 10 | |
| 6 | 27 August; 19:00 | H | Chemnitzer FC | 2–0 | 3.420 | Soriano 54'; Marchese 86' (pen.) | Röseler (yellow card) 13' (yellow card) 79' (red card); Stenzel (yellow card) 76'; Conrad (yellow card) 85' | 1 | +6 | 13 | |
| 7 | 31 August; 14:00 | A | Arminia Bielefeld | 2–4 | 10.322 | Marchese 22' (pen.); Braun (yellow card) 32'; Edwini-Bonsu (yellow card) 35'; G. Müller (red card) 38'; Gaiser (yellow card) 63'; Soriano 63' | Klos (yellow card) 35'; Hemlein (yellow card) 38'; Schuppan (yellow card) 43'; C. Müller 45+2', 47', 78'; Börner 52' (yellow card) 70'; Schütz (yellow card) 82' | 2 | +4 | 13 | |
| 8 | 6 September; 14:00 | H | SC Fortuna Köln | 2–0 | 3.050 | Fennell 40'; Braun (yellow card) 43'; Badiane 66' | Fink (yellow card) 41'; Andersen (yellow card) 60'; Marquet (yellow card) 68' | 1 | +6 | 16 | |
| 9 | 13 September; 14:00 | A | MSV Duisburg | 0–2 | 11.533 | Marchese (yellow card) 78'; Halimi (yellow card) 82' | Gardawski 16'; Hajri (yellow card) 44'; Grote 48'; Scheidhauer (yellow card) 78' | 6 | +4 | 16 | |
| 10 | 19 September; 19:00 | H | VfL Osnabrück | 1–1 | 2.825 | Fennell (yellow card) 24'; G. Müller (yellow card) 36'; Soriano 54'; Gersterr (yellow card) 84' | Grassi (yellow card) 20'; Willers (yellow card) 34'; Iljutcenko (yellow card) 43'; Menga 50'; Kandziora (yellow card) 85' | 5 | +4 | 17 | |
| 11 | 23 September; 19:00 | H | SpVgg Unterhaching | 3–0 | 2.200 | Stein 30' (yellow card) 52'; Edwini-Bonsu 35'; Halimi 64' | Götze (yellow card) 38'; Dittrich (yellow card) 52' | 3 | +7 | 20 | |
| 12 | 27 September; 14:00 | A | Borussia Dortmund II | 1–1 | 432 | Calamita (yellow card) 58'; Marchese 69' (pen.) | Narey (yellow card) 26'; Stanković (yellow card) 59'; Sarr (yellow card) 68' (red card); Zimmermann (yellow card) 73'; Harder 83' (pen.); Kefkir (yellow card) 87' | 5 | +7 | 21 | |
| 13 | 4 October; 14:00 | H | FC Hansa Rostock | 3–0 | 4.060 | Halimi 12'; Soriano 27'; Braun 28'; Gaiser (yellow card) 86' | Ruprecht (yellow card) 18'; Krauße (yellow card) 69'; Schünemann (yellow card) 85' | 2 | +10 | 24 | |
| 14 | 18 October; 14:00 | A | VfB Stuttgart II | 1–5 | 2.200 | Sama 33' (o.g.); Fennell (yellow card) 34'; Gaiser (yellow card) 76'; Kaiser (yellow card) 86' | Ginczek 14'; Wanitzek 42', 71' (yellow card) 59'; Baumgartl 48'; Rathgeb (yellow card) 73'; Kiesewetter (yellow card) 74'; Grüttner 87' | 6 | +6 | 24 | |
| 15 | 25 October; 14:00 | H | Energie Cottbus | 2–2 | 3.925 | Halimi (yellow card) 22'; G. Müller (yellow card) 30'; Badiane 52'; Soriano 73' | Zeitz 22'; Kaufmann (yellow card) 33'; Möhrle 88' (yellow card) 58' | 5 | +6 | 25 | |
| 16 | 1 November; 14:00 | A | Dynamo Dresden | 1–1 | 23.501 | Badiane (yellow card) 5'; Gaiser (yellow card) 51'; Stein 90+2' | Erdmann (yellow card) 90'; Tekerci 54' (yellow card) 90' | 7 | +6 | 26 | |
| 17 | 8 November; 14:00 | H | SC Preußen Münster | 1–1 | 3.150 | G. Müller (yellow card) 13'; Gaiser (yellow card) 39'; Baumgärtel (red card) 44'; Halimi (yellow card) 54'; Badiane 56'; Leutenecker (yellow card) 73'; Soriano (yellow card) 90+2' | Zenga 24' (yellow card) 55'; Piossek (yellow card) 33'; Schöneberg (yellow card) 45+2' | 8 | +6 | 27 | |
| 18 | 22 November; 14:00 | A | FC Rot-Weiß Erfurt | 1–1 | 4.171 | Kaiser (yellow card) 43' (goal) 50' | Kammlott 61'; Möckel (yellow card) 76'; Tyrala (yellow card) 90' | 9 | +6 | 28 | |
| 19 | 29 November; 14:00 | H | Holstein Kiel | 0–0 | 2.555 | Braun (yellow card) 20'; Kaiser (yellow card) 89' (red card) | Heider (yellow card) 41'; Schäffler (yellow card) 54'; Kohlmann (yellow card) 83' | 9 | +6 | 29 | |
| 20 | 6 December; 14:00 | H | SV Wehen Wiesbaden | 2–1 | 2.155 | Starostzik (yellow card) 24'; Fennell 78' (yellow card) 79'; Engelbrecht 90+2' (yellow card) 90+2' | Herzig (yellow card) 29'; Vunguidica (yellow card) 64'; R. Müller (yellow card) 76'; Benyamina 81' (pen.) | 5 | +7 | 32 | |
| 21 | 13 December; 14:00 | A | SSV Jahn Regensburg | 2–0 | 2.909 | Baumgärtel 3'; G. Müller (yellow card) 69'; Stein 75' (pen.) | Herzel (yellow card) 33'; Palionis (yellow card) 40'; Aosman (yellow card) 69'; Hein (yellow card) 76' | 3 | +9 | 35 | |
| 22 | 20 December; 14:00 | H | SG Sonnenhof Großaspach | 2–0 | 3.160 | Braun 29'; Engelbrecht 79' | Jüllich (yellow card) 66' (red card); Rizzi (yellow card) 66' | 3 | +11 | 38 | |
| 23 | 1 February; 14:00 | A | 1. FSV Mainz 05 II | 3–2 | 991 | Calamita 60'; G. Müller 62'; Leutenecker 88'; Fischer (yellow card) 88' | Saller (yellow card) 23'; Bouziane 52'; Höler 54' | 3 | +12 | 41 | |
| 24 | 6 February; 19:00 | H | Hallescher FC | Postponed | | | | | | | |
| 25 | 14 February; 14:00 | A | Chemnitzer FC | 1–1 | 5.095 | Leutenecker (yellow card) 72'; Calamita 89' | Poggenberg (yellow card) 69'; Löning 74'; Danneberg (yellow card) 78'; Conrad (yellow card) 89' | 5 | +12 | 42 | |
| 26 | 21 February; 14:00 | H | Arminia Bielefeld | 0–2 | 8.250 | Braun (yellow card) 72'; Engelbrecht (yellow card) 82' | Salger (yellow card) 52'; Schütz 62'; Burmeister (yellow card) 65'; Ulm (yellow card) 72'; Dick 82' | 7 | +10 | 42 | |
| 27 | 28 February; 14:00 | A | SC Fortuna Köln | 2–0 | 1.568 | Marchese 19' (pen.); Edwini-Bonsu 33'; Starostzik (yellow card) 62' | Fink (yellow card) 19'; Kraus (yellow card) 54'; Flottmann (yellow card) 66'; Biada (yellow card) 69'; Aydogmus (yellow card) 84' | 6 | +12 | 45 | |
| 28 | 7 March; 14:00 | H | MSV Duisburg | 4–2 | 8.650 | Badiane 18'; Braun 27'; Calamita 54'; Stein 57'; Marchese (yellow card) 82' | Bajić (yellow card) 55'; Dausch 60', 77' (yellow card) 65'; Janjić (yellow card) 63'; Scheidhauer (yellow card) 84' | 4 | +14 | 48 | |
| 28 | 10 March; 19:00 | H | Hallescher FC | 1–1 | 5.220 | Braun (yellow card) 88' (red card); Fischer 90+1' | Gogia (yellow card) 31'; Bertram (yellow card) 44'; Banović (yellow card) 50'; Franke (yellow card) 56'; Aydemir (yellow card) 88'; Furuholm 89' (yellow card) 90+2' | 3 | +14 | 49 | |
| 29 | 14 March; 14:00 | A | VfL Osnabrück | 1–4 | 8.053 | Baumgärtel 50'; Bahn (yellow card) 52' | Willers 6'; Iljutcenko 10'; Odenthal 20'; Alvarez 44' | 5 | +11 | 49 | |
| 30 | 21 March; 14:00 | A | SpVgg Unterhaching | 2–1 | 2.000 | Baumgärtel 7'; Halimi (yellow card) 9'; Stein (yellow card) 21' (goal) 82'; Calamita (yellow card) 88' | Köpke 4'; Gaska (yellow card) 15'; Schwarz (yellow card) 63'; Erb (yellow card) 90' | 4 | +12 | 52 | |
| 31 | 4 April; 14:00 | H | Borussia Dortmund II | 2–0 | 5.500 | Bahn (yellow card) 39' (goal) 86'; Marchese 67' (pen.) | Solga (yellow card) 41'; Narey (yellow card) 52'; Bonmann (yellow card) 69'; Amini (yellow card) 90' (red card) | 3 | +14 | 55 | |
| 32 | 11 April; 14:00 | A | FC Hansa Rostock | 0–1 | 10.600 | Leutenecker (yellow card) 37'; Marchese (yellow card) 61' | Kofler (yellow card) 43'; Weidlich 61' (yellow card) 79' | 4 | +13 | 55 | |
| 33 | 18 April; 14:00 | H | VfB Stuttgart II | 2–1 | 8.100 | Starostzik (yellow card) 14'; Marchese 34' (yellow card) 65'; Fischer 84' (yellow card) 88' | Berko 4'; Grüttner (yellow card) 66' | 4 | +14 | 58 | |
| 34 | 25 April; 14:00 | A | Energie Cottbus | 0–2 | 5.426 | Bahn (yellow card) 61'; Fennell (yellow card) 84' | Kaufmann 25' (yellow card) 73'; Kleindienst 37' (yellow card) 54'; Ledgerwood (yellow card) 55'; Mimbala (yellow card) 88' | 4 | +12 | 58 | |
| 35 | 2 May; 14:00 | H | Dynamo Dresden | 3–4 | 8.000 | Engelbrecht 26'; Stein (yellow card) 33' (goal) 83'; Fennell (yellow card) 63'; Baumgärtel (red card) 63'; Edwini-Bonsu 75' | Kreuzer 14'; Stefaniak 29'; Hefele (yellow card) 34'; Fennell 57' (o.g.); Hartmann (yellow card) 67' (goal) 90+2'; Dürholtz (yellow card) 84' | 4 | +11 | 58 | |
| 36 | 9 May; 14:00 | A | SC Preußen Münster | 3–2 | 6.069 | Engelbrecht (yellow card) 24'; Halimi (yellow card) 59'; G. Müller 64'; Edwini-Bonsu (yellow card) 74'; Braun (yellow card) 85'; Ivan (yellow card) 86'; Fischer 81', 90+2' | Kara 17'; Truckenbrod (yellow card) 25'; Hoffmann (yellow card) 39'; Scherder 57' | 4 | +12 | 61 | |
| 37 | 16 May; 13:30 | H | FC Rot-Weiß Erfurt | 0–0 | 4.730 | Leutenecker (yellow card) 55'; Bahn (yellow card) 72' | Czichos (yellow card) 36'; Judt (yellow card) 38'; Palacios Martínez (yellow card) 66'; Baumgarten (yellow card) 76' | 4 | +13 | 62 | |
| 38 | 23 May; 13:30 | A | Holstein Kiel | 2–0 | 9.167 | Edwini-Bonsu 40'; Bahn 49'; Halimi (yellow card) 73' | Herrmann (yellow card) 57'; Kazior (yellow card) 73' | 4 | +15 | 65 | |

==== Table ====
===== League table =====
| Pos | Team | Pld | W | D | L | GF | GA | GD | Pts | Promotion, qualification or relegation |
|---|---|---|---|---|---|---|---|---|---|---|
| 2 | MSV Duisburg (P) | 38 | 20 | 11 | 7 | 63 | 40 | +23 | 71 | Promotion to 2. Bundesliga and qualification for DFB-Pokal |
| 3 | Holstein Kiel | 38 | 18 | 13 | 7 | 53 | 30 | +23 | 67 | Qualification for promotion play-offs and DFB-Pokal |
| 4 | Stuttgarter Kickers | 38 | 18 | 11 | 9 | 61 | 47 | +14 | 65 | Qualification for DFB-Pokal |
| 5 | Chemnitzer FC | 38 | 17 | 8 | 13 | 44 | 36 | +8 | 59 | |
| 6 | Dynamo Dresden | 38 | 16 | 8 | 14 | 52 | 48 | +4 | 56 | |

Source: DFB
Rules for classification: 1) Points; 2) Goal difference; 3) Goals scored
(P) Promoted

===== Summary table =====
| Overall | | | | | | | | Home | | | | | | Away | | | | | |
| Pld | W | D | L | GF | GA | GD | Pts | W | D | L | GF | GA | GD | W | D | L | GF | GA | GD |
|---|---|---|---|---|---|---|---|---|---|---|---|---|---|---|---|---|---|---|---|
| 38 | 18 | 11 | 9 | 61 | 47 | +14 | 65 | 11 | 6 | 2 | 35 | 16 | +19 | 7 | 5 | 7 | 26 | 31 | −5 |

=== DFB-Pokal ===
Win Draw Loss

| Rd | Date KO | Venue | Opponent | Res. F–A | Att. | Goalscorers and disciplined players | | Ref. |
| Rd | Date KO | Venue | Opponent | Res. F–A | Att. | Stuttgarter Kickers | Opponent | Ref. |
|---|---|---|---|---|---|---|---|---|
| Round 1 | 16 August; 15:30 | H | Borussia Dortmund | 1–4 | 37,000 | Edwini-Bonsu 60' | Mkhitaryan 30' (yellow card) 75'; Aubameyang 55', 78'; Ramos (yellow card) 84' (goal) 89' | |

=== Württemberg Cup ===
Win Draw Loss

| Rd | Date KO | Venue | Opponent | Res. F–A | Att. | Goalscorers and disciplined players | | Ref. |
| Rd | Date KO | Venue | Opponent | Res. F–A | Att. | Stuttgarter Kickers | Opponent | Ref. |
|---|---|---|---|---|---|---|---|---|
| 1 | Bye | | | | | | | |
| 2 | Bye | | | | | | | |
| 3 | 3 September; 17:45 | A | SV Böblingen | 2–0 | 1,128 | Marchese (yellow card) 45'; Badiane; Leutenecker (yellow card) 67'; Gaiser (yellow card) 68'; Miftari 78' | Knoll (yellow card) 70'; Vargas Müller (yellow card) 80' | |
| R16 | 11 October; 15:30 | A | TuS Metzingen | 1–0 | 700 | Soriano 39'; Badiane (yellow card) 77' | Plangger (yellow card) 33'; Frick (yellow card) 47'; Dieze (yellow card) 87' | |
| QF | 15 November; 13:30 | A | FV Ravensburg | 0–1 | 1,500 | Braun (yellow card); Soriano (yellow card) 90+1' | Jatta 17'; Toprak (yellow card) 36'; Zimmermann (yellow card) 86'; Wohlfarth (yellow card) 90+1' | |

== Team statistics ==
| Competition | First match | Last match | Starting round | Final position | Record | | | | | | | |
| Competition | First match | Last match | Starting round | Final position | G | W | D | L | GF | GA | GD | Win % |
|---|---|---|---|---|---|---|---|---|---|---|---|---|
| 3. Liga | 26 July | 23 May | Matchday 1 | 4th | 38 | 18 | 11 | 9 | 61 | 47 | +14 | 47.37 |
| DFB-Pokal | 16 August | | Round 1 | | 1 | 0 | 0 | 1 | 1 | 4 | −3 | 0.00 |
| Württemberg Cup | 3 September | 15 November | Round 3 | Quarterfinal | 3 | 2 | 0 | 1 | 3 | 1 | +2 | 66.67 |
| Total | | | | | 42 | 20 | 11 | 11 | 65 | 52 | +13 | 47.62 |

== Squad information ==
=== Squad and statistics ===
Squad Season 2014–15
| No. | Player | Nat. | Birthdate | at Kickers since | previous club | 3. Liga | | DFB-Pokal | | WFV-Pokal | |
| No. | Player | Nat. | Birthdate | at Kickers since | previous club | App | Gls | App | Gls | App | Gls |
Goalkeepers
| 1 | Korbinian Müller | (Germany) | 6 February 1991 | 2014 | SpVgg Unterhaching | 35 | 0 | 0 | 0 | 1 | 0 |
| 30 | Mark Redl | (Germany) | 6 January 1993 | 2013 | TSG Hoffenheim Junior Team | 3 | 0 | 1 | 0 | 2 | 0 |
| 32 | Tobias Trautner | (Germany) | 5 March 1995 | 2011 | Junior Team | 0 | 0 | 0 | 0 | 0 | 0 |
Defenders
| 2 | Maximilian Hoffmann | (Germany) | 12 February 1992 | 2014 | SV Germania Schöneiche | 0 | 0 | 0 | 0 | 0 | 0 |
| 4 | Hendrik Starostzik | (Germany) | 28 March 1991 | 2014 | VfL Bochum II | 25 | 0 | 0 | 0 | 2 | 0 |
| 16 | Fabio Leutenecker | (Germany) | 15 March 1988 | 2006 | Junior Team | 37 | 1 | 1 | 0 | 2 | 0 |
| 17 | Fabian Gerster | (Germany) | 29 December 1986 | 2009 | SC Pfullendorf | 14 | 0 | 0 | 0 | 3 | 0 |
| 21 | Marc Stein | (Germany) | 7 July 1986 | 2013 | Kickers Offenbach | 36 | 7 | 1 | 0 | 2 | 0 |
| 26 | Royal-Dominique Fennell | (United States) | 5 June 1989 | 2007 | Junior Team | 26 | 3 | 1 | 0 | 2 | 0 |
| 27 | Fabian Baumgärtel | (Germany) | 7 July 1989 | 2013 | Alemannia Aachen | 32 | 3 | 1 | 0 | 3 | 0 |
Midfielders
| 6 | Sandrino Braun (vice-captain) | (Germany) | 4 July 1988 | 2012 | SC Pfullendorf | 31 | 4 | 1 | 0 | 3 | 0 |
| 7 | Marco Calamita | (Italy) | 22 March 1983 | 2013 | VfR Aalen | 23 | 3 | 1 | 0 | 2 | 0 |
| 8 | Gerrit Müller | (Germany) | 26 April 1984 | 2013 | 1. FC Heidenheim | 33 | 4 | 1 | 0 | 2 | 0 |
| 10 | Vincenzo Marchese (captain) | (Italy) | 19 May 1983 | 2009 | SSV Ulm 1846 | 29 | 7 | 1 | 0 | 1 | 0 |
| 12 | Andreas Ivan | (Germany) | 10 January 1995 | 2012 | Junior Team | 4 | 0 | 0 | 0 | 1 | 0 |
| 14 | Umberto Tedesco | (Italy) | 9 June 1992 | 2012 | SC Freiburg II | 0 | 0 | 0 | 0 | 1 | 0 |
| 18 | Marco Gaiser | (Germany) | 11 January 1993 | 2011 | Junior Team | 13 | 0 | 0 | 0 | 2 | 0 |
| 20 | Besar Halimi | (Kosovo) | 12 December 1994 | 2014 | VfB Stuttgart II | 37 | 2 | 1 | 0 | 2 | 0 |
| 22 | Athanasios Raptis | (Greece) | 13 May 1995 | 2013 | Junior Team | 0 | 0 | 0 | 0 | 0 | 0 |
| 23 | Daniel Kaiser | (Germany) | 18 October 1990 | 1994 | Junior Team | 9 | 1 | 0 | 0 | 2 | 0 |
| 24 | Amar Cekic | (Germany) | 21 December 1992 | 2014 | Junior Team | 1 | 0 | 0 | 0 | 0 | 0 |
| 28 | Bentley Baxter Bahn | (Germany) | 28 August 1992 | 2015 | FC St. Pauli | 9 | 2 | 0 | 0 | 0 | 0 |
Forwards
| 3 | Daniel Lang | (Germany) | 17 May 1992 | 2014 | Junior Team | 1 | 0 | 0 | 0 | 0 | 0 |
| 9 | Elia Soriano | (Italy) | 26 June 1989 | 2013 | Karlsruher SC | 20 | 6 | 1 | 0 | 3 | 1 |
| 11 | Lhadji Badiane | (France) | 16 April 1987 | 2013 | Stade Lavallois | 31 | 5 | 1 | 0 | 3 | 1 |
| 13 | Randy Edwini-Bonsu | (Canada) | 20 April 1990 | 2014 | Eintracht Braunschweig | 35 | 5 | 1 | 1 | 1 | 0 |
| 19 | Daniel Engelbrecht | (Germany) | 5 November 1990 | 2013 | VfL Bochum | 19 | 3 | 0 | 0 | 1 | 0 |
| 37 | Manuel Fischer | (Germany) | 19 September 1989 | 2015 | SG Sonnenhof Großaspach | 13 | 4 | 0 | 0 | 0 | 0 |
Players transferred out during the season
| 33 | Shkemb Miftari | (Germany) | 1 August 1993 | 2013 | VfL Wolfsburg II | 8 | 0 | 0 | 0 | 2 | 1 |

- Amar Cekic and Daniel Lang had no professional contract, they usually played at Stuttgarter Kickers II.

==== Top scorers ====
| Rank | Player | Position | 3. Liga | DFB-Pokal | WFV-Pokal | Total |
|---|---|---|---|---|---|---|
| 1 | (Germany) Marc Stein | DF | 7 | 0 | 0 | 7 |
| 1 | (Italy) Vincenzo Marchese | MF | 7 | 0 | 0 | 7 |
| 1 | (Italy) Elia Soriano | FW | 6 | 0 | 1 | 7 |
| 4 | (France) Lhadji Badiane | FW | 5 | 0 | 1 | 6 |
| 4 | (Canada) Randy Edwini-Bonsu | FW | 5 | 1 | 0 | 6 |
| 6 | (Germany) Sandrino Braun | MF | 4 | 0 | 0 | 4 |
| 6 | (Germany) Gerrit Müller | MF | 4 | 0 | 0 | 4 |
| 6 | (Germany) Manuel Fischer | FW | 4 | 0 | 0 | 4 |
| 9 | (Italy) Marco Calamita | MF | 3 | 0 | 0 | 3 |
| 9 | (Germany) Daniel Engelbrecht | FW | 3 | 0 | 0 | 3 |
| 9 | (Germany) Fabian Baumgärtel | DF | 3 | 0 | 0 | 3 |
| 9 | (United States) Royal-Dominique Fennell | DF | 3 | 0 | 0 | 3 |
| 13 | (Kosovo) Besar Halimi | MF | 2 | 0 | 0 | 2 |
| 13 | (Germany) Bentley Baxter Bahn | MF | 2 | 0 | 0 | 2 |
| 15 | (Germany) Daniel Kaiser | MF | 1 | 0 | 0 | 1 |
| 15 | (Germany) Shkemb Miftari | FW | 1 | 0 | 0 | 1 |
| 15 | (Germany) Fabio Leutenecker | DF | 1 | 0 | 0 | 1 |
| Own goals | | | 1 | 0 | 0 | 1 |
| Total | | | 61 | 1 | 3 | 65 |

=== Penalties ===
All competitions

| Player | Penalties |
|---|---|
| (Italy) Vincenzo Marchese | 7 (1) |
| (Germany) Marc Stein | 1 (0) |

3. Liga

| Player | Penalties |
|---|---|
| (Italy) Vincenzo Marchese | 7 (1) |
| (Germany) Marc Stein | 1 (0) |

()* = Penalties saved
Last updated: 18 May 2015

=== Clean sheets ===
| Goalkeeper | Date | Competition | Opponent | Score |
|---|---|---|---|---|
| Korbinian Müller | 9 August | 3. Liga | FSV Mainz 05 II | 2–0 |
| Korbinian Müller | 27 August | 3. Liga | Chemnitzer FC | 2–0 |
| Mark Redl | 3 September | Württemberg Cup | SV Böblingen | 2–0 |
| Korbinian Müller | 6 September | 3. Liga | SC Fortuna Köln | 2–0 |
| Korbinian Müller | 23 September | 3. Liga | SpVgg Unterhaching | 3–0 |
| Korbinian Müller | 5 October | 3. Liga | FC Hansa Rostock | 3–0 |
| Korbinian Müller | 11 October | Württemberg Cup | TuS Metzingen | 1–0 |
| Korbinian Müller | 29 November | 3. Liga | Holstein Kiel | 0–0 |
| Korbinian Müller | 13 December | 3. Liga | SSV Jahn Regensburg | 2–0 |
| Korbinian Müller | 20 December | 3. Liga | SG Sonnenhof Großaspach | 2–0 |
| Korbinian Müller | 28 February | 3. Liga | SC Fortuna Köln | 2–0 |
| Korbinian Müller | 4 April | 3. Liga | Borussia Dortmund II | 2–0 |
| Mark Redl | 16 May | 3. Liga | FC Rot-Weiß Erfurt | 0–0 |
| Korbinian Müller | 23 May | 3. Liga | Holstein Kiel | 2–0 |

=== Multi–goal matches ===
| Goalscorer | Date | Competition | Opponent | Score |
|---|---|---|---|---|
| Manuel Fischer | 9 May | 3. Liga | SC Preußen Münster | 3–2 |

=== Overview of statistics ===
| Statistic | Overall | 3. Liga | DFB-Pokal | Württemberg Cup |
|---|---|---|---|---|
| Most appearances | Leutenecker (40) | Halimi & Leutenecker (37) | 13 players^{3} (1) | Baumgärtel, Gerster, Braun, Soriano & Badiane (3) |
| Most starts | Leutenecker (40) | Halimi & Leutenecker (36) | 11 players^{7} (1) | Baumgärtel, Gerster, Braun, Soriano & Badiane (3) |
| Most substitute appearances | Edwini-Bonsu (19) | Edwini-Bonsu (19) | Calamita & Badiane (1) | Miftari (2) |
| Top goalscorer | Soriano, Stein & Marchese (7) | Stein & Marchese (7) | Edwini-Bonsu (1) | Badiane, Miftari & Soriano (1) |

=== Discipline ===
==== Cards ====
| Player | Total | | | 3. Liga | | | DFB-Pokal | | | Württemberg Cup | | |
| Player | Booked | (yellow card) (red card) | Sent off (straight red) | Booked | (yellow card) (red card) | Sent off (straight red) | Booked | (yellow card) (red card) | Sent off (straight red) | Booked | (yellow card) (red card) | Sent off (straight red) |
|---|---|---|---|---|---|---|---|---|---|---|---|---|
| Sandrino Braun | 8 | 1 | 0 | 7 | 1 | 0 | 0 | 0 | 0 | 1 | 0 | 0 |
| Royal-Dominique Fennell | 7 | 0 | 0 | 7 | 0 | 0 | 0 | 0 | 0 | 0 | 0 | 0 |
| Besar Halimi | 7 | 0 | 0 | 7 | 0 | 0 | 0 | 0 | 0 | 0 | 0 | 0 |
| Marco Gaiser | 6 | 0 | 0 | 5 | 0 | 0 | 0 | 0 | 0 | 1 | 0 | 0 |
| Gerrit Müller | 5 | 0 | 1 | 5 | 0 | 1 | 0 | 0 | 0 | 0 | 0 | 0 |
| Fabio Leutenecker | 5 | 0 | 0 | 4 | 0 | 0 | 0 | 0 | 0 | 1 | 0 | 0 |
| Vincenzo Marchese | 5 | 0 | 0 | 4 | 0 | 0 | 0 | 0 | 0 | 1 | 0 | 0 |
| Bentley Baxter Bahn | 4 | 0 | 0 | 4 | 0 | 0 | 0 | 0 | 0 | 0 | 0 | 0 |
| Daniel Kaiser | 3 | 1 | 0 | 3 | 1 | 0 | 0 | 0 | 0 | 0 | 0 | 0 |
| Hendrik Starostzik | 3 | 0 | 0 | 3 | 0 | 0 | 0 | 0 | 0 | 0 | 0 | 0 |
| Daniel Engelbrecht | 3 | 0 | 0 | 3 | 0 | 0 | 0 | 0 | 0 | 0 | 0 | 0 |
| Marc Stein | 3 | 0 | 0 | 3 | 0 | 0 | 0 | 0 | 0 | 0 | 0 | 0 |
| Elia Soriano | 3 | 0 | 0 | 2 | 0 | 0 | 0 | 0 | 0 | 1 | 0 | 0 |
| Fabian Baumgärtel | 2 | 0 | 2 | 2 | 0 | 2 | 0 | 0 | 0 | 0 | 0 | 0 |
| Marco Calamita | 2 | 0 | 0 | 2 | 0 | 0 | 0 | 0 | 0 | 0 | 0 | 0 |
| Randy Edwini-Bonsu | 2 | 0 | 0 | 2 | 0 | 0 | 0 | 0 | 0 | 0 | 0 | 0 |
| Manuel Fischer | 2 | 0 | 0 | 2 | 0 | 0 | 0 | 0 | 0 | 0 | 0 | 0 |
| Lhadji Badiane | 2 | 0 | 0 | 1 | 0 | 0 | 0 | 0 | 0 | 1 | 0 | 0 |
| Korbinian Müller | 1 | 0 | 0 | 1 | 0 | 0 | 0 | 0 | 0 | 0 | 0 | 0 |
| Fabian Gerster | 1 | 0 | 0 | 1 | 0 | 0 | 0 | 0 | 0 | 0 | 0 | 0 |
| Andreas Ivan | 1 | 0 | 0 | 1 | 0 | 0 | 0 | 0 | 0 | 0 | 0 | 0 |
| Totals | 75 | 2 | 3 | 69 | 2 | 3 | 0 | 0 | 0 | 6 | 0 | 0 |
Last updated: 18 May 2015

==== Suspensions ====
| No. | Player | No. of matches served | Reason | Competition served in | Date served | Opponent(s) | Source |
|---|---|---|---|---|---|---|---|
| 8 | Gerrit Müller | 2 | Red card vs. Arminia Bielefeld | 3. Liga | 6 September | SC Fortuna Köln | |
| 8 | Gerrit Müller | 2 | Red card vs. Arminia Bielefeld | 3. Liga | 13 September | MSV Duisburg | |
| 27 | Fabian Baumgärtel | 3 | Red card vs. SC Preußen Münster. | 3. Liga | 22 November | FC Rot-Weiß Erfurt | |
| 27 | Fabian Baumgärtel | 3 | Red card vs. SC Preußen Münster. | 3. Liga | 29 November | Holstein Kiel | |
| 27 | Fabian Baumgärtel | 3 | Red card vs. SC Preußen Münster. | 3. Liga | 6 December | SV Wehen Wiesbaden | |
| 18 | Marco Gaiser | 1 | Fifth yellow card | 3. Liga | 22 November | FC Rot-Weiß Erfurt | |
| 6 | Sandrino Braun | 1 | Fifth yellow card | 3. Liga | 6 December | SV Wehen Wiesbaden | |
| 23 | Daniel Kaiser | 1 | Yellow-red card vs. Holstein Kiel | 3. Liga | 6 December | SV Wehen Wiesbaden | |
| 26 | Royal-Dominique Fennell | 1 | Fifth yellow card | 3. Liga | 13 December | SSV Jahn Regensburg | |
| 8 | Gerrit Müller | 1 | Fifth yellow card | 3. Liga | 20 December | SG Sonnenhof Großaspach | |
| 6 | Sandrino Braun | 1 | Yellow-red card vs. Hallescher FC | 3. Liga | 14 March | VfL Osnabrück | |
| 20 | Besar Halimi | 1 | Fifth yellow card | 3. Liga | 4 April | Borussia Dortmund II | |
| 27 | Fabian Baumgärtel | 3 | Red card vs. Dynamo Dresden. | 3. Liga | 9 May | SC Preußen Münster | |
| 27 | Fabian Baumgärtel | 3 | Red card vs. Dynamo Dresden. | 3. Liga | 16 May | FC Rot-Weiß Erfurt | |
| 27 | Fabian Baumgärtel | 3 | Red card vs. Dynamo Dresden. | 3. Liga | 23 May | Holstein Kiel | |

== Team kit ==
| Home | Home Alt. | Home Alt. 2 | Away | Third | Third Alt. | Third Alt. 2 |

| Type | Shirt | Shorts | Socks | First appearance / info |
|---|---|---|---|---|
| Home | Blue | Blue | Blue | |
| Home Alt. | Blue | Blue | White | 3. Liga, Match 9, 13 September against MSV Duisburg |
| Home Alt. 2 | Blue | White | White | 3. Liga, Match 30, 21 March against SpVgg Unterhaching |
| Away | Black | Black | Black | |
| Third | Yellow | White | White | Württemberg Cup, Round of 16, 4 September against TuS Metzingen |
| Third Alt. | Yellow | White | Black | 3. Liga, Match 7, 31 August against Arminia Bielefeld |
| Third Alt. 2 | Yellow | Black | White | 3. Liga, Match 29, 14 March against VfL Osnabrück |

== Reserve team ==
Kickers' reserve team played in the Oberliga Baden-Württemberg and the coach was Jürgen Hartmann.

Note: Flags indicate national team as defined under FIFA eligibility rules; some limited exceptions apply. Players may hold more than one non-FIFA nationality.

| No. | Pos. | Nation | Player |
|---|---|---|---|
| 1 | GK | (Romania) ROU | Alexander Loch |
| 2 | DF | (Germany) GER | Tim Roos |
| 3 | MF | (Germany) GER | Marco Koch |
| 4 | DF | (Germany) GER | Marc-Alan Sauer |
| 5 | DF | (Germany) GER | Dustin Kappus |
| 6 | MF | (Italy) ITA | Antonio Di Matteo |
| 7 | MF | (Turkey) TUR | Volkan Celiktas |
| 8 | DF | (Germany) GER | Kai Mäckle |
| 9 | FW | (Germany) GER | Daniel Lang |
| 10 | MF | (Italy) ITA | Davide Pumilia |
| 13 | MF | (Croatia) CRO | Zvonimir Kovac |
| 14 | MF | (Germany) GER | Denis Gudzevic |

| No. | Pos. | Nation | Player |
|---|---|---|---|
| 15 | DF | (Germany) GER | Tobias Heim |
| 16 | MF | (Germany) GER | Amar Cekic |
| 17 | DF | (Greece) GRE | Theodoros Liakas |
| 18 | FW | (Italy) ITA | Marcel Montagnese |
| 19 | MF | (Croatia) CRO | Ivan Vidovic |
| 20 | MF | (Netherlands) NED | Anthony Coppola |
| 21 | GK | (Germany) GER | Tobias Trautner |
| 22 | FW | (Germany) GER | Karl-Luis Dees |
| 23 | DF | (Italy) ITA | Marco Romano |
| 24 | DF | (Turkey) TUR | Abdullah Sener |
| 31 | DF | (Germany) GER | Christoph Bauer |
| — | GK | (Germany) GER | Max Wohlfahrt |

== Technical staff ==
| Position | Held by |
|---|---|
| President | Rainer Lorz |
| Sporting director | Michael Zeyer |
| Manager | Horst Steffen |
| Personal assistant | Sreto Ristić |
| Assistant coach | Timm Fahrion |
| Goalkeeping coach | Tobias Linse |
| Fitness coach | Marc Rösgen |

== Notes ==
- 3. Redl, Leutenecker, Fennell, Stein, Baumgärtel, Halimi, Marchese, Braun, G. Müller, Soriano, Edwini-Bonsu, Badiane, Calamita
- 7. Redl, Leutenecker, Fennell, Stein, Baumgärtel, Halimi, Marchese, Braun, G. Müller, Soriano, Edwini-Bonsu
