= Maika =

Maika may refer to:

== People ==
=== Given name ===
- Maika (wrestler), 舞華, Japanese professional wrestler
- Maika Elan (born 1986), Vietnamese photographer
- Maika Felise, Samoan rugby league player
- Maika Friemann-Jennert (born 1964), German politician
- Maika Hamano (born 2004), Japanese football player
- Maika Monroe (born 1993), American actress
- Maika Makovski (born 1983), Spanish songwriter, singer
- Maika Ortiz (born 1991), Filipino volleyball player
- Maika Ozaki (tennis) (born 1984), Japanese tennis player
- Maika Ozaki (尾崎妹加, born 1991), Japanese wrestler
- Maika Rivera (born 1995), Filipino tennis player, model and actress
- Maika Sivo (born 1993), Fijian rugby league player
- Maika Ruyter-Hooley (born 1987), Australian football player
- Maika Yamamoto (山本 舞香, born 1997), Japanese actress and fashion model

=== Surname ===
- Purakau Maika (1851/1852 – 4 August 1917) was a New Zealand newspaper editor and publisher

== Fictional characters ==
- Maika Chōno, a character from Aikatsu Friends!
- Maika Halfwolf, the main character in the comic series Monstress
- Maika Sakuranomiya, a character from the Japanese manga and anime series Blend S
- Maika Tsuchimikado, a character from the Japanese manga and anime series A Certain Magical Index
- Maika Yoshikawa, a character from the Japanese manga and anime series Magikano

== Other uses ==
- Māika, a species of orchid native to eastern and southern Australia, New Zealand and New Caledonia
- AS Maïka, a football club in Uvira, Democratic Republic of Congo
- Maika Holdings, a Malaysian investment company
- Ngāti Maika II, an Iwi (tribe) in Māoridom

== See also ==
- Maik (disambiguation)
- Maike
- Majka
- Micah
- Mika
