= Maik =

Maik may refer to

== People with the given name ==
- Maik Außendorf (born 1971), German politician
- Maik Baier (born 1989), German racing cyclist
- Maik Beermann (born 1981), German politician
- Maik Baumgarten (born 1993), German football player
- Maik Brückner (born 1992), German politician
- Maik Bullmann (born 1967), German Greco-Roman wrestler
- Maik Eckhardt (born 1970), German sport shooter
- Maik Franz (born 1981), German football player
- Maik Galakos (born 1951), Greek football player
- Maik (footballer, born 2005), full name Maik Gomes Viegas, Brazilian football player
- Maik Hamburger (1931–2020), German translator, writer
- Maik Heydeck (born 1965), German boxer
- Maik Hosang (born 1961), German philosopher
- Maik Kegel (born 1989), German football player
- Maik Kischko (born 1966), German football player
- Maik Kotsar (born 1996), Estonian basketball player
- Maik Kuivenhoven (born 1988), Dutch darts player
- Maik Krahberg (born 1971), German artistic gymnast
- Maik Landsmann (born 1967), German track cyclist
- Maik Langendorf (born 1972), German-Austrian darts player
- Maik Łukowicz (born 1995), Polish football player
- Maik Naumenko (1955–1991), Soviet rock musician, singer
- Maik Nawrocki (born 2001), Polish football player
- Maik Nill (born 1963), German weightlifter
- Maik Machulla (born 1977), German retired handball player
- Maik Odenthal (born 1992), German football player
- Maik Petzold (born 1978), Germany athlete
- Maik dos Santos (born 1989), Brazilian handball goalkeeper
- Maik Schutzbach (born 1986), German football player
- Maik Szarszewski (born 1972), German archer
- Maik Tändler (born 1979), German historian
- Maik Taylor (born 1971), Northern Ireland football player
- Maik Wagefeld (born 1981), German football player
- Maik Walpurgis (born 1973), German football coach
- Maik Walter (1925–2020), Polish-French football player
- Maik Zirbes (born 1990), German basketball player
- Maik Yohansen (1895–1937), Ukrainian poet
- Maciej Maik (1984–2003), Polish swimmer

== Other uses ==
- 52005 Maik, a main-belt asteroid
- MAIK Nauka/Interperiodica, a Russian academic publisher
- Maik Klingenberg, character in Goodbye Berlin

== See also ==
- Mike (disambiguation)
