= Hendrik Starostzik =

German footballer

Personal information
- Date of birth: 28 March 1991 (age 35)
- Place of birth: Marburg, Germany
- Height: 1.89 m (6 ft 2 in)
- Position: Centre-back

Team information
- Current team: VfB Marburg

Youth career
- –2007: VfB Marburg
- 2007–2010: SC Paderborn

Senior career*
Years	Team	Apps	(Gls)
2010–2011	SC Paderborn II		
2011–2012	SC Wiedenbrück	2	(0)
2012–2014	VfL Bochum II	46	(1)
2014–2016	Stuttgarter Kickers	53	(1)
2014	Stuttgarter Kickers II	4	(0)
2016–2017	Dynamo Dresden	4	(0)
2017–2019	Hallescher FC	15	(0)
2019	Pacific FC	15	(1)
2020	Næstved	0	(0)
2020–2021	FC Gießen	30	(4)
2021–2024	Hessen Kassel	44	(4)
2024–	VfB Marburg	0	(0)
- * Club domestic league appearances and goals as of 04:55, 4 July 2024 (UTC)

Hendrik Starostzik (born 28 March 1991) is a German professional footballer who plays as a centre-back for VfB Marburg.

== Career ==
=== Stuttgarter Kickers ===
On 13 May 2014, Starostzik signed with 3. Liga side Stuttgarter Kickers. He broke into a starting role in his first season, making 25 appearances, 24 of which were starts and added one goal. Starostzik helped Kickers earn a fourth-place finish in the 3. Liga that season, one spot short of the promotion play-off.

Starostzik continued to be a regular presence on the Kickers backline in the 2015–16 season, making 28 appearances, however the year ended poorly as the club was narrowly relegated by goals for after tying with Werder Bremen II on points and goal difference.

=== Dynamo Dresden ===
In May 2016, Starostzik signed with newly promoted 2. Bundesliga side Dynamo Dresden. On 18 December 2016, he made his 2. Bundesliga debut as an 84th-minute substitute in a 2–1 win over Arminia Bielefeld. He went on to make a total of only four appearances that season, including two starts.

=== Hallescher FC ===
Frustrated with his lack of playing time in Dresden, Starostzik returned to the 3. Liga in July 2017, signing with Hallescher FC. He appeared in 15 of Halle's first 16 matches of the season, including 14 starts, before suffering an injury in a match against Preußen Münster on 17 November 2017. After recovering from his injury, Starostzik saw almost no playing time for the rest of the season, except for one appearance in the Saxony-Anhalt Cup against 1. FC Magdeburg in March 2018. This treatment persisted into the 2018–19 season as Starostzik was not even named to the club's 18 for the entire first half of the season, and as a result Starostzik asked to leave the club to pursue other opportunities during the 2018–19 winter transfer window.

=== Pacific FC ===
On 7 March 2019, Starostzik signed with Canadian Premier League side Pacific FC. On 28 April 2019, Starostzik scored Pacific FC's first goal in history, in their inaugural game. The match ended in a 1–0 victory over HFX Wanderers FC. Starostzik's goal was the first header in Canadian Premier League history, as well as the first goal by a foreigner. On 4 November 2019, the club announced that Starostzik would not be offered a contract for the following season.

=== Næstved ===
On 5 January 2020, Starostzik joined Danish 1st Division side Næstved.

=== FC Gießen ===
Starostzik returned to Germany in the summer 2020, signing a one-year deal with FC Gießen on 2 July.

== Career statistics ==
As of 25 October 2019

Appearances and goals by club, season and competition
Club	Season	League			National cup		League cup		Continental		Other		Total	
Club	Season	Division	Apps	Goals	Apps	Goals	Apps	Goals	Apps	Goals	Apps	Goals	Apps	Goals
SC Wiedenbrück	2011–12	Regionalliga West	2	0	1	0	—		—		0	0	3	0
VfL Bochum II	2012–13	Regionalliga West	14	0	—		—		—		0	0	14	0
VfL Bochum II	2013–14	Regionalliga West	32	1	—		—		—		0	0	32	1
VfL Bochum II	Total		46	1	0	0	0	0	0	0	0	0	46	1
Stuttgarter Kickers	2014–15	3. Liga	25	1	0	0	—		—		0	0	25	1
Stuttgarter Kickers	2015–16	3. Liga	28	0	1	0	—		—		0	0	29	0
Stuttgarter Kickers	Total		53	1	1	0	0	0	0	0	0	0	54	1
Stuttgarter Kickers II	2014–15	Oberliga Baden-Württemberg	4	0	—		—		—		0	0	4	0
Dynamo Dresden	2016–17	2. Bundesliga	4	0	1	0	—		—		0	0	5	0
Hallescher FC	2017–18	3. Liga	15	0	0	0	—		—		0	0	15	0
Hallescher FC	2018–19	3. Liga	0	0	0	0	—		—		0	0	0	0
Hallescher FC	Total		15	0	0	0	0	0	0	0	0	0	15	0
Pacific FC	2019	Canadian Premier League	15	1	0	0	—		—		0	0	15	1
Career total			139	3	3	0	0	0	0	0	0	0	142	3
