= Andreas Ivan =

Romanian footballer (born 1995)

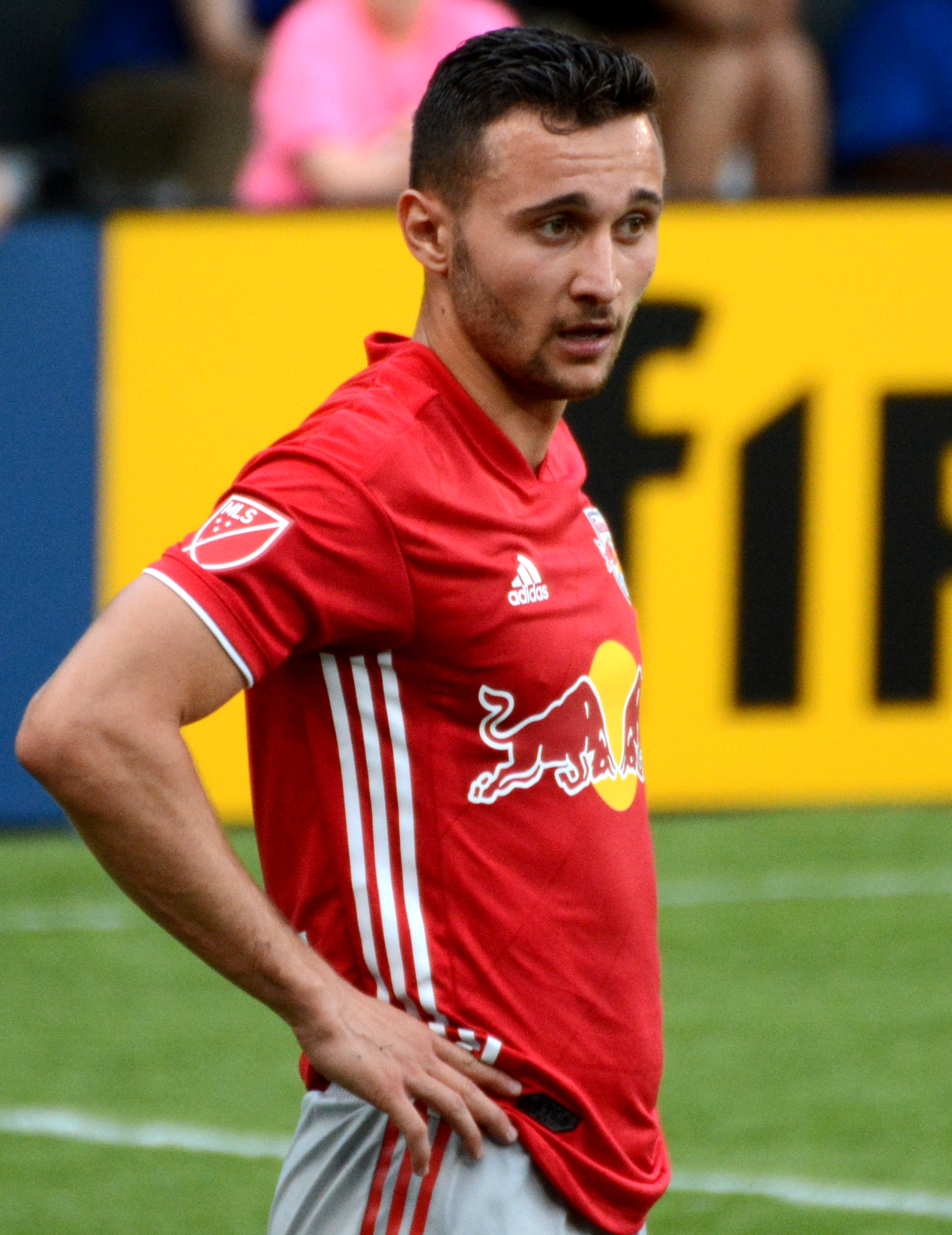
- Ivan with New York Red Bulls in 2019

Personal information
- Full name: Andreas Ionuț Ivan
- Date of birth: 10 January 1995 (age 31)
- Place of birth: Pitești, Romania
- Height: 1.80 m (5 ft 11 in)
- Positions: Attacking midfielder; winger

Youth career
- VfB Stuttgart
- –2012: Karlsruher SC
- 2012–2014: Stuttgarter Kickers

Senior career*
Years	Team	Apps	(Gls)
2014–2016	Stuttgarter Kickers	16	(0)
2014–2015	Stuttgarter Kickers II	22	(3)
2016–2017	Rot-Weiss Essen	23	(1)
2017	Wuppertaler SV	11	(3)
2017–2018	Waldhof Mannheim	31	(8)
2018–2019	New York Red Bulls	21	(1)
2018–2019	New York Red Bulls II	4	(1)
2020	VfR Aalen	2	(0)
2020–2021	Sonnenhof Großaspach	35	(3)
2021–2022	Rot Weiss Ahlen	28	(10)
2022–2024	Schalke 04 II	30	(7)
2023	Schalke 04	1	(0)
2024–2025	Eintracht Trier	14	(2)

International career
2014	Germany U19	1	(0)
2015	Romania U21	2	(0)
- * Club domestic league appearances and goals as of 17 May 2025

Andreas Ivan (Romanian pronunciation: [iˈvan]; born 10 January 1995) is a Romanian professional footballer who plays as an attacking midfielder or winger.

Ivan spent the first part of his senior career in the lower leagues of Germany, representing Stuttgarter Kickers, Rot-Weiss Essen, Wuppertaler SV and SV Waldhof Mannheim respectively. In the summer of 2018, aged 23, he signed for New York Red Bulls in the Major League Soccer.

== Club career ==
=== Early years ===
A native of Pitești, Romania, Ivan began his career in the youth ranks of German clubs VfB Stuttgart and Karlsruher SC, before moving to Stuttgarter Kickers where signed his first professional contract on 1 January 2014. He made his professional debut on 9 February that year, appearing as a starter in a 1–0 victory over VfB Stuttgart II.

At the start of 2016, he joined regional league team Rot-Weiss Essen, where he won the Lower Rhine Cup 3–0 against Wuppertaler SV on 28 May. In the 2017 winter break, Ivan moved to league rivals Wuppertaler SV. Ivan scored his first two goals for the club on 25 February 2017, in a 4–1 victory over Rot Weiss Ahlen.

In the summer of 2017, Ivan signed a one-year contract with SV Waldhof Mannheim. On 4 September 2017, Ivan netted his first goal for "the Waldhof Boys" in a 2–0 victory over FSV Frankfurt. In his sole season at the club, Ivan made 31 appearances and scored eight goals.

=== New York Red Bulls ===
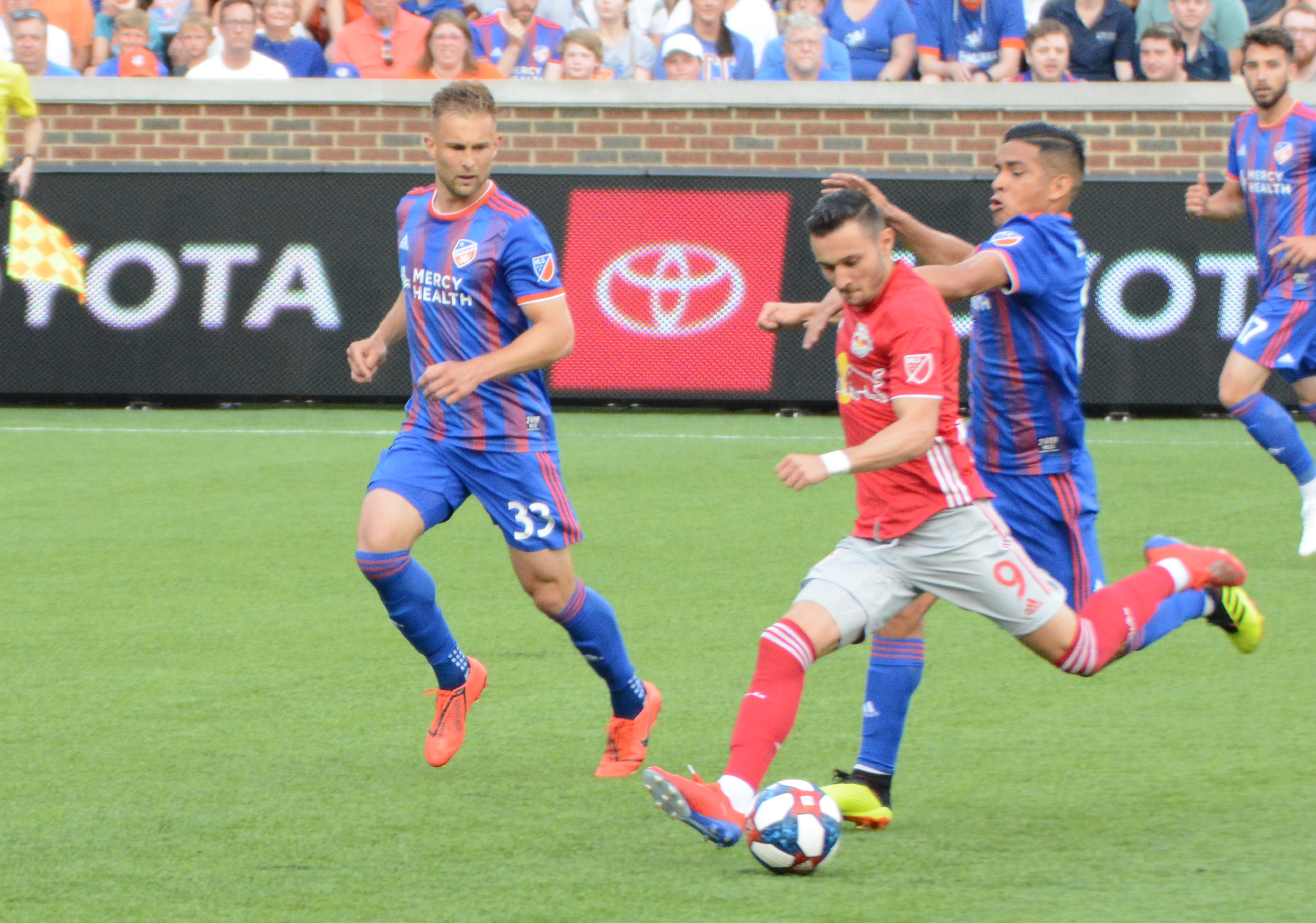
Ivan taking a shot against FC Cincinnati in 2019

On 8 July 2018, it was reported that Ivan had rejected a trial with Hamburger SV and would be joining Major League Soccer team New York Red Bulls. On 20 July, the signing was officially announced by the American side. He made his debut by appearing as a second-half substitute in a 1–0 victory over Chicago Fire, on 11 August.

He scored his first competitive goal for the Red Bulls on 27 February 2019, helping to a 3–0 victory over Dominican club Atlético Pantoja in the CONCACAF Champions League's round of 16. Three days later, he also recorded his first MLS goal after opening the scoring with a header in an eventual 1–1 draw with Columbus Crew.

On 14 August 2019, Ivan was waived by New York.

=== Further career ===
On 30 January 2020, Ivan returned to Germany, joining Regionalliga Südwest club VfR Aalen on a contract until the end of the season. He appeared in two league games for the club and was released at the end of the season after his contract expired.

Ivan signed a two-year contract with fellow Regionalliga Südwest club Sonnenhof Großaspach in August 2020. He agreed the termination of his contract on 31 August 2021, the last day of the 2021 summer transfer window. He then moved to Rot Weiss Ahlen.

=== Schalke 04 ===
On 27 July 2022, Ivan agreed to join Schalke 04, where he was initially assigned to the reserve team. He made his Bundesliga debut for the first team of Schalke on 24 January 2023, coming on as a substitute in the 46th minute in a 6–1 home defeat against RB Leipzig.

== International career ==
Born in Romania, Ivan represented Germany at under-19 level, earning a cap on 5 March 2014 in a 1–1 draw with Italy. In 2015, he was convoked by his native country for the under-21 team.

== Career statistics ==
=== Club ===
As of match played 17 May 2025

Appearances and goals by club, season and competition
Club	Season	League			Cup		Continental		Other		Total	
Club	Season	Division	Apps	Goals	Apps	Goals	Apps	Goals	Apps	Goals	Apps	Goals
Stuttgarter Kickers	2013–14	3. Liga	10	0	–		–		–		10	0
Stuttgarter Kickers	2014–15	3. Liga	4	0	0	0	–		–		4	0
Stuttgarter Kickers	2015–16	3. Liga	2	0	1	0	–		–		3	0
Stuttgarter Kickers	Total		16	0	1	0	–		–		17	0
Stuttgarter Kickers II	2014–15	Oberliga Baden-Württ.	14	3	–		–		–		14	3
Stuttgarter Kickers II	2015–16	Oberliga Baden-Württ.	8	0	–		–		–		8	0
Stuttgarter Kickers II	Total		22	3	–		–		–		22	3
Rot-Weiss Essen	2015–16	Regionalliga West	15	1	–		–		–		15	1
Rot-Weiss Essen	2016–17	Regionalliga West	8	0	0	0	–		–		8	0
Rot-Weiss Essen	Total		23	1	0	0	–		–		23	1
Wuppertaler SV	2016–17	Regionalliga West	11	3	–		–		–		11	3
Waldhof Mannheim	2017–18	Regionalliga Südwest	31	8	–		–		1 (Note: Appearances in 3.Liga promotion play-offs)	0	32	8
New York Red Bulls	2018	Major League Soccer	9	0	–		–		2 (Note: Appearances in MLS Cup Playoffs)	0	11	0
New York Red Bulls	2019	Major League Soccer	12	1	1	0	3 (Note: Appearances in CONCACAF Champions League)	1	–		16	2
New York Red Bulls	Total		21	1	1	0	3	1	2	0	27	2
New York Red Bulls II	2018	USL Championship	2	1	–		–		–		2	1
New York Red Bulls II	2019	USL Championship	2	0	–		–		–		2	0
New York Red Bulls II	Total		4	1	–		–		–		4	1
VfR Aalen	2019–20	Regionalliga Südwest	2	0	–		–		–		2	0
Sonnenhof Großaspach	2020–21	Regionalliga Südwest	33	3	–		–		–		33	3
Sonnenhof Großaspach	2021–22	Regionalliga Südwest	2	0	–		–		–		2	0
Sonnenhof Großaspach	Total		35	3	–		–		–		35	3
Rot Weiss Ahlen	2021–22	Regionalliga West	28	10	–		–		–		28	10
Schalke 04 II	2022–23	Regionalliga West	16	5	–		–		–		16	5
Schalke 04 II	2023–24	Regionalliga West	14	2	–		–		–		14	2
Schalke 04 II	Total		30	7	–		–		–		30	7
Schalke 04	2022–23	Bundesliga	1	0	–		–		–		1	0
Eintracht Trier	2022–23	Regionalliga Südwest	14	2	0	0	–		–		14	2
Career total			238	39	2	0	3	1	3	0	246	40

== Honours ==
Rot-Weiss Essen

- Lower Rhine Cup: 2016

New York Red Bulls

- Supporters' Shield: 2018
