= Manuel Fischer =

German footballer (born 1989)

Personal information
- Date of birth: 19 September 1989 (age 37)
- Place of birth: Aalen, West Germany
- Height: 1.82 m (6 ft 0 in)
- Position: Striker

Youth career
- –2002: SV Ebnat
- 2002–2004: VfB Stuttgart
- 2004–2005: SSV Ulm 1846
- 2005–2006: VfB Stuttgart

Senior career*
Years	Team	Apps	(Gls)
2006–2011	VfB Stuttgart II	38	(7)
2007–2009	VfB Stuttgart	3	(1)
2009	→ TuS Koblenz (loan)	10	(1)
2010–2011	→ Wacker Burghausen (loan)	2	(0)
2011	→ 1. FC Heidenheim II (loan)	6	(3)
2011–2012	Bayern Munich II	25	(3)
2012–2013	SpVgg Unterhaching	12	(3)
2013–2014	SG Sonnenhof Großaspach	41	(15)
2015–2016	Stuttgarter Kickers	27	(4)
2015	→ Stuttgarter Kickers II	3	(3)
2016–2017	FC Homburg	21	(3)
2017	SSV Reutlingen 05	3	(0)
2017–2018	TeBe Berlin	9	(5)
2018–2019	GSV Maichingen	14	(19)

International career
	Germany U-16	2	(0)
	Germany U-17	16	(15)
2006–2008	Germany U-19	18	(7)
- * Club domestic league appearances and goals

Manuel Fischer (born 19 September 1989) is a German retired footballer who played as a striker.

== Career ==
Fischer began his career with VfB Stuttgart. He appeared for the club's reserve side in the Regionalliga Süd.

He made his professional debut on 12 December 2007 against FC Barcelona in the UEFA Champions League.

Fischer set a record for the greatest number of goals scored in an international under-17 season in 2005–06 with a total of 13.

The then 19-year-old scored his first Bundesliga goal on 17 May 2008 in the last game of the 2007–08 season.

On 4 July 2008, he extended his contract until the summer of 2011.

On 6 January 2009, Fischer was loaned out to TuS Koblenz until the end of the season.

In July 2010, he was loaned out to SV Wacker Burghausen until the end of the season, but the loan was terminated because of a knee injury after six months.

After his medical rehabilitation Fischer kept himself fit on loan at the second team of 1. FC Heidenheim 1846 until the summer of 2011. He left Stuttgart in summer 2011 to sign for Bayern Munich II, where he spent a year before signing for SpVgg Unterhaching. Half a season later he signed for fourth tier Regionalliga Südwest club SG Sonnenhof Großaspach, helping them to achieve promotion to 3. Liga in 2014.

In January 2015, he transferred to fellow 3. Liga side Stuttgarter Kickers, signing a contract until 2016.

== Personal life ==
His brother Sebastian currently plays football for SSV Ulm 1846.
