= Shkemb Miftari =

German footballer

Personal information
- Date of birth: August 1, 1993 (age 33)
- Place of birth: Freyung, Germany
- Height: 1.87 m (6 ft 2 in)
- Position: Forward

Team information
- Current team: SV Fellbach
- Number: 9

Youth career
- –2011: Wacker Burghausen
- 2011–2012: VfB Stuttgart

Senior career*
| Years | Team | Apps | (Gls) |
| 2012–2013 | VfL Wolfsburg II | 8 | (0) |
| 2013–2015 | Stuttgarter Kickers II | 29 | (16) |
| 2015–2018 | Stuttgarter Kickers | 21 | (0) |
| 2015 | Waldhof Mannheim | 5 | (0) |
| 2015 | SSV Reutlingen 05 | 0 | (0) |
| 2015–2018 | Calcio Leinfelden-Echterdingen | 57 | (33) |
| 2018 | Schalke 04 II | 16 | (6) |
| 2018–2020 | Stuttgarter Kickers | 56 | (16) |
| 2020– | SV Fellbach | 2 | (0) |
- * Club domestic league appearances and goals as of 15:55, 2 March 2020 (UTC)

Shkemb Miftari (born August 1, 1993) is a German footballer of Albanian descent who plays for SV Fellbach.
