= Marco Gaiser =

German footballer

Personal information
- Date of birth: 11 January 1993 (age 33)
- Place of birth: Tübingen, Germany
- Height: 1.87 m (6 ft 1 1/2 in)
- Position: Midfielder

Team information
- Current team: SSV Reutlingen 05
- Number: 8

Youth career
- TB Kirchentellinsfurt
- SV Rommelsbach
- –2008: SSV Reutlingen 05
- 2008–2010: VfB Stuttgart
- 2010–2011: SSV Reutlingen 05
- 2011–2012: Stuttgarter Kickers

Senior career*
Years	Team	Apps	(Gls)
2012–2014	Stuttgarter Kickers II	61	(3)
2014–2016	Stuttgarter Kickers	16	(0)
2016	→ FC 08 Homburg (loan)	12	(1)
2016–2019	FC 08 Homburg	75	(4)
2019–2022	TSG Balingen	40	(2)
2022–	SSV Reutlingen 05	3	(0)
- * Club domestic league appearances and goals as of 18 November 2022

Marco Gaiser (born 11 January 1993) is a German footballer who plays for SSV Reutlingen 05 in the Oberliga Baden-Württemberg.
