= Badiane =

Badiane may refer to:

- A synonym for the spice star anise
- A character in the animated film Sailor Moon Super S: The Movie
- Lhadji Badiane (b. 1987), French-Senegalese footballer
- Malick Badiane (b. 1984), Senegalese basketball player
