= Fabio Leutenecker =

German footballer

Personal information
- Date of birth: 15 March 1990 (age 36)
- Place of birth: Remseck am Neckar, Germany
- Height: 1.77 m (5 ft 9 1/2 in)
- Position: Full back

Youth career
- 1996–1997: TSV Poppenweiler
- 1997–1999: TSV Neckargröningen
- 1999–2004: VfB Stuttgart
- 2004–2009: Stuttgarter Kickers

Senior career*
Years	Team	Apps	(Gls)
2009–2012	Stuttgarter Kickers II	61	(6)
2011–2016	Stuttgarter Kickers	132	(6)
2016–2017	MSV Duisburg	10	(0)
2017–2018	Chemnitzer FC	26	(0)
- * Club domestic league appearances and goals as of 17 October 2018

Fabio Leutenecker (born 15 March 1990) is a German footballer who last played for Chemnitzer FC.

== Career ==
He signed for MSV Duisburg on 16 June 2016. For the 2017–18 season, he moved to Chemnitzer FC.
