= Royal-Dominique Fennell =

American soccer player

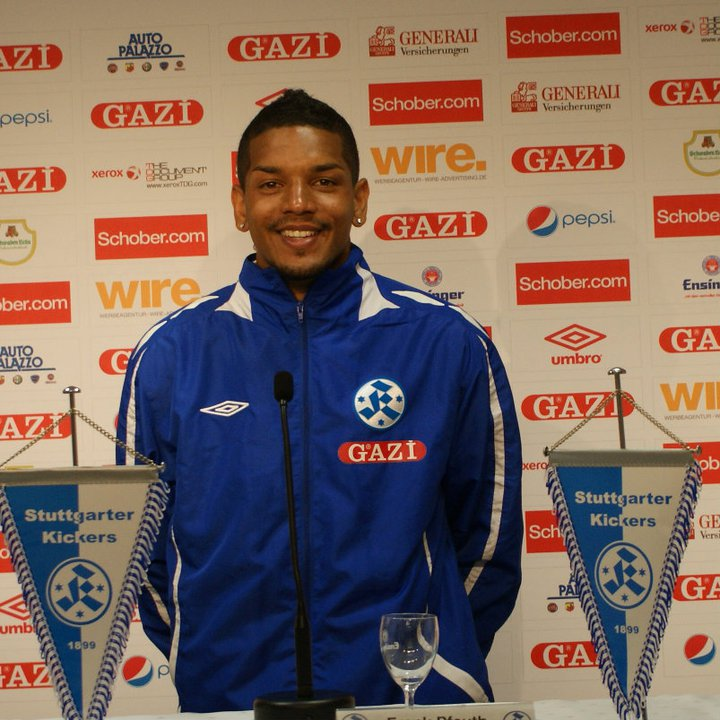
- Fennell in 2013

Personal information
- Full name: Royal-Dominique Fennell
- Date of birth: June 5, 1989 (age 37)
- Place of birth: Fort Irwin, California, United States
- Height: 1.83 m (6 ft 0 in)
- Positions: Defensive midfielder; center back

Team information
- Current team: SGV Freiberg
- Number: 6

Youth career
- Frisch Auf Göppingen
- VfB Stuttgart
- –2007: SSV Ulm 1846
- 2007–2009: Stuttgarter Kickers

Senior career*
Years	Team	Apps	(Gls)
2009–2011	Stuttgarter Kickers II	57	(2)
2010–2015	Stuttgarter Kickers	119	(12)
2015–2016	Würzburger Kickers	37	(4)
2016–2018	Hallescher FC	53	(6)
2018–2019	VfR Aalen	36	(2)
2019–2020	1899 Hoffenheim II	17	(0)
2021–	SGV Freiberg	0	(0)

International career
2011	United States U23	1	(0)
- * Club domestic league appearances and goals as of 00:13, February 1, 2021 (UTC)

Royal-Dominique Fennell (born June 5, 1989) is an American soccer player who plays for SGV Freiberg as a defensive midfielder.

== International career ==
Fennell was first called into United States Youth National Teams in late 2011 when United States U23 manager Caleb Porter was looking for answers to a shallow pool of U-23 defenders. Fennell participated in several camps and was called to the qualifying squad, but his club, which was in the throes of a promotion race, did not release him.

On 16 July 2019, TSG 1899 Hoffenheim announced that they had signed Fennell on a one-year contract, where he was going to play for the reserve team, 1899 Hoffenheim II.
