= Jonas Meiser =

German footballer

Personal information
- Date of birth: 3 January 1999 (age 27)
- Place of birth: Böblingen, Germany
- Height: 1.78 m (5 ft 10 in)
- Position: Forward

Team information
- Current team: SSV Reutlingen 05
- Number: 7

Youth career
- –2014: VfB Stuttgart
- 2014–2018: Stuttgarter Kickers

Senior career*
Years	Team	Apps	(Gls)
2017–2018	Stuttgarter Kickers	13	(3)
2018–2022	Sonnenhof Großaspach	52	(4)
2022–2024	TSG Balingen	54	(11)
2024–	SSV Reutlingen 05	34	(6)
- * Club domestic league appearances and goals as of 17:59, 7 October 2025 (UTC)

Jonas Meiser (born 3 January 1999) is a German footballer who plays as a forward for SSV Reutlingen 05.
