= Konstantinos Markopoulos =

Greek footballer (born 1992)

Personal information
- Date of birth: 8 February 1992 (age 34)
- Place of birth: Drama, Greece
- Height: 1.75 m (5 ft 9 in)
- Position: Striker

Team information
- Current team: SSV Reutlingen
- Number: 9

Youth career
- Pandramaikos

Senior career*
Years	Team	Apps	(Gls)
2012–2013	Union SG	4	(1)
2013–2014	AS Pangeo		
2014–2015	Vyzantio		
2015–2016	Panthrakikos	4	(0)
2016–2018	Doxa Drama	26	(3)
2018–2020	Kavala	22	(2)
2020–2022	FSV 08 Bissingen	27	(15)
2022	SGV Freiberg	15	(1)
2022–2025	1. CfR Pforzheim	84	(66)
2025–	SSV Reutlingen	10	(5)
- * Club domestic league appearances and goals as of 20 November 2022

Konstantinos Markopoulos (Greek: Κωνσταντίνος Μαρκόπουλος; born 8 February 1992) is a Greek professional footballer who plays as a striker for German club SSV Reutlingen.

== Honours ==
Kavala

- Gamma Ethniki: 2018–19
