= Sandrino Braun-Schumacher =

German footballer

Personal information
- Date of birth: 4 July 1988 (age 38)
- Place of birth: Lahr, West Germany
- Height: 1.80 m (5 ft 11 in)
- Position: Defensive midfielder

Youth career
- –2001: Offenburger FV
- 2001–2006: SC Freiburg

Senior career*
Years	Team	Apps	(Gls)
2006–2009	SC Freiburg II	16	(0)
2009–2012	SC Pfullendorf	85	(12)
2012	Stuttgarter Kickers II	3	(0)
2012–2016	Stuttgarter Kickers	131	(12)
2016–2019	Preußen Münster	66	(0)
2019–2024	SC Freiburg II	105	(1)
Total		406	(25)

International career
2004	Germany U16	2	(0)
- * Club domestic league appearances and goals

Sandrino Braun-Schumacher (born 4 July 1988) is a German former professional footballer who played as a defensive midfielder.

== Career ==
Braun-Schumacher retired at the end of the 2023–24 season.

Since summer 2024, Braun-Schumacher has been the individual coach and assistant coach of SC Freiburg's women's team.

== Personal life ==
Braun-Schumacher is married to Linda.
