= Daniel Kaiser (footballer, born 1990) =

German footballer

Personal information
- Date of birth: 18 October 1990 (age 36)
- Place of birth: Stuttgart, Germany
- Height: 1.78 m (5 ft 10 in)
- Position: Midfielder

Team information
- Current team: Viktoria Berlin
- Number: 6

Youth career
- 1994–2009: Stuttgarter Kickers

Senior career*
Years	Team	Apps	(Gls)
2009–2016	Stuttgarter Kickers II	150	(21)
2014–2016	Stuttgarter Kickers	9	(1)
2016–2017	ZFC Meuselwitz	26	(0)
2017–2019	Viktoria Berlin	49	(4)
2019–2020	SGV Freiberg		
2020–	SV Tasmania Berlin		
- * Club domestic league appearances and goals

Daniel Kaiser (born 18 October 1990) is a German professional footballer who plays as a midfielder for NOFV-Oberliga Nord club SV Tasmania Berlin.
