= Maika Holdings =

Maika Holdings is an investment company founded in 1983 by the Malaysian Indian Congress (MIC) political party. The company was meant to be a vehicle for members and poor Indians in Malaysia to invest in, to increase their share of corporate wealth and help lift the community out of poverty. It raised significant cash, RM106 million by 1984 from more than 66,000 shareholders, mostly from poor Indian farmers who supported the party, and was at one point one of the richest companies in Malaysia. MIC officials even circulated throughout their constituencies, convincing poor party members to invest everything they had, going so far as telling them to sell their property and livestock for the cause. The company made investments in a variety of sectors including construction, satellite communications, insurance, and financial management.

In February 1992 journalists discovered a discrepancy related to the distribution of shares in Syarikat Telekom Malaysia Bhd (STMB). In the end, MIC President Datuk Seri S Samy Vellu, who was also the largest shareholder of Maika Holdings with 2.8 million shares, had decided that Maika Holdings would only receive 1 million of the 10 million shares that had been allocated to it, with the rest being distributed to three other companies. The three other companies had connections to each other and to MIC leadership, such as sharing directors and shareholders, and two of them shared an address. A 17- month investigation by the Anti Corruption Agency cleared Datuk Vellu of any wrongdoing and he continued as CEO. In 1994, the chairman of MIC Public Claims Committee, V Subramaniam accused Vellu of theft of the shares, alleging that accounts had been fabricated to make it appear as if the profits from the shares were granted to the MIC Maju Institute of Education Development, but the complaint was not followed up on, and eventually Vellu appointed his own son, Vell Paari as CEO of Maika Holdings in 1999, keeping control within the family. The Telekom deal was just the first in a series of privatisations of government agents and departments. Since that one, Maika Holdings has had several more offers of shares, but they have been continually mismanaged or corruptly managed by Mr. Vellu.

In 2004, representatives of the PKR filed a fresh complaint on the matter, alleging possession of documents which revealed Samy Vellu's involvement in the scandal, including a letter by former MIC PR Committee Chairman V. Subramaniam which accused Vellu of controlling the distribution of shares. Photocopies of Vellu's bank statements showed millions of RMs transferred between March and May 1992, but it was not completely clear that the transactions were related to the scandal.

The losses at MIC continued to mount for years. At its 24th annual general meeting (AGM) in 2007, Maika was reported to have lost a total of RM9.03 million (2.2 million dollars US) by the end of 2006. In 2018, the Pakatan Harapan Government alleged that Maika Holdings scandal saw more than RM100 million (23.7 million dollars US) stolen from the Malaysian Indian community.

== Investments ==
Maika Holdings as at one time or another held significant investments in the following companies:

- Syarikat Telekom Malaysia Bhd (STMB)
- United Asian Bank (UAB)
- United Oriental Assurance (UOA)
- Malaysian Airlines System (MAS)
- Malaysian International Shipping Corporation (MISC)
- TV3
- Edaran Otomobil Malaysia Bhd (EON)
