= Tobias Fink =

German footballer

Personal information
- Date of birth: 11 December 1983 (age 42)
- Place of birth: Hirschau, West Germany
- Height: 1.78 m (5 ft 10 in)
- Position: Defender

Youth career
- 1987–1997: 1. FC Schlicht
- 1997–1998: 1. FC Schwandorf
- 1998–2002: SG Post/Süd Regensburg

Senior career*
Years	Team	Apps	(Gls)
2002–2003	Jahn Regensburg II		
2003–2005	Jahn Regensburg	17	(1)
2005	SV Wacker Burghausen	0	(0)
2006	Jahn Regensburg	13	(1)
2006–2013	FC Ingolstadt 04	113	(2)
2013–2016	Fortuna Köln	76	(1)
- * Club domestic league appearances and goals as of 1 July 2016

Tobias Fink (born 11 December 1983 in Hirschau) is a retired German footballer. He is the younger brother of fellow footballer Oliver Fink.

He made his debut on the professional league level when he started for FC Ingolstadt 04 in the 2. Bundesliga game against SpVgg Greuther Fürth on 17 August 2008. After his retirement from professional football, he still plays low class amateur football for FV Vilseck.
