= Marc Stein (footballer) =

German footballer

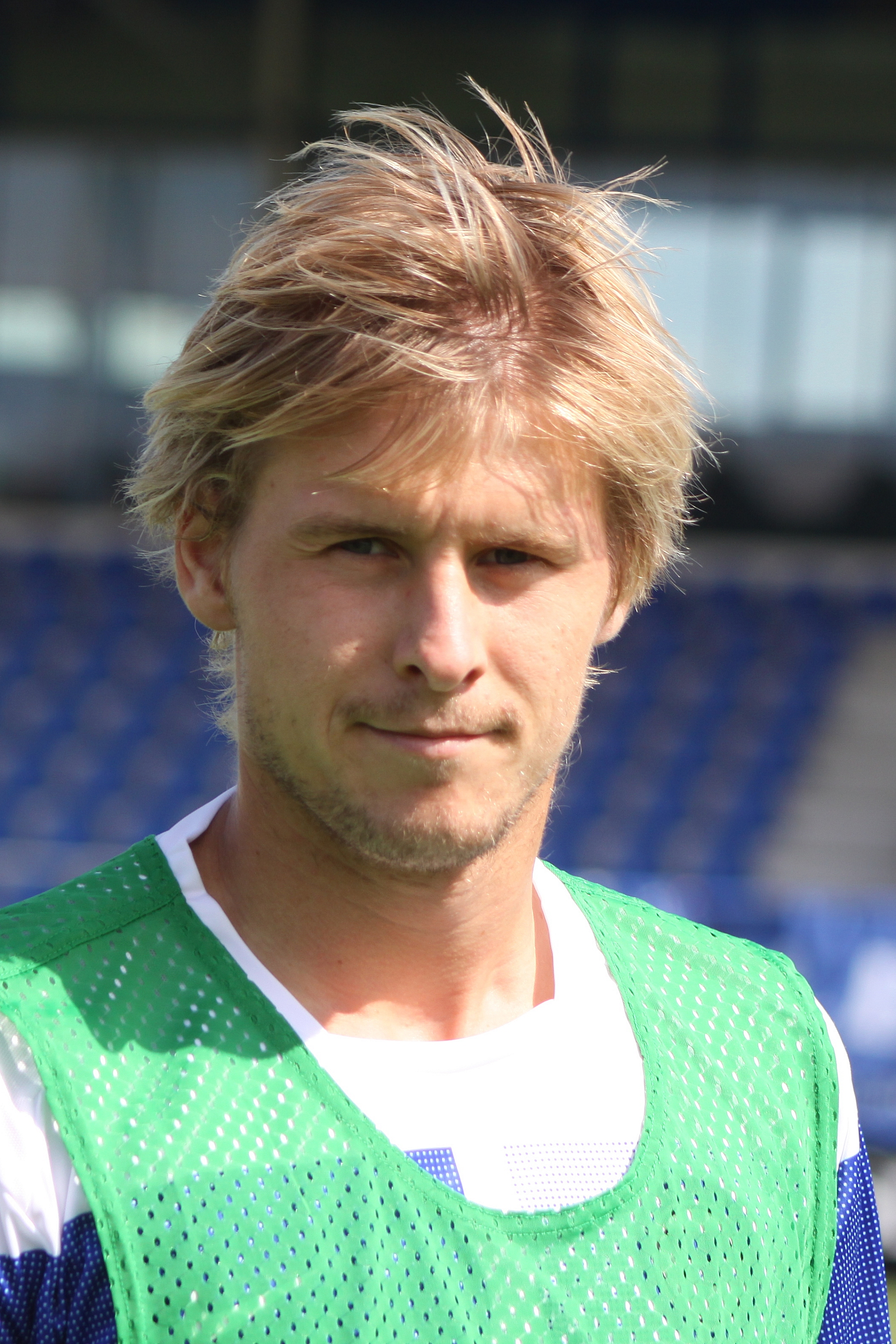
- Stein with Hertha BSC in 2009

Personal information
- Date of birth: 7 July 1985 (age 41)
- Place of birth: Potsdam, East Germany
- Height: 1.84 m (6 ft 0 in)
- Positions: Full-back; wing-back

Team information
- Current team: VfB Stuttgart II
- Number: 5

Youth career
- 1992–1997: ESV LOK Seddin
- 1997–2000: Berliner FC Dynamo
- 2000–2004: Tennis Borussia Berlin

Senior career*
Years	Team	Apps	(Gls)
2004	Tennis Borussia Berlin	2	(0)
2004–2006	Hansa Rostock II	43	(4)
2006–2008	Hansa Rostock	73	(4)
2008–2010	Hertha BSC	42	(0)
2010–2011	FSV Frankfurt	10	(0)
2011–2013	Kickers Offenbach	68	(0)
2013–2016	Stuttgarter Kickers	102	(8)
2016–2019	Energie Cottbus	80	(11)
2019–	VfB Stuttgart II	69	(7)
- * Club domestic league appearances and goals as of 27 February 2022

Marc Stein (born 7 July 1985) is a German former professional footballer who played as a full-back.

== Career ==
In January 2019, Stein agreed the termination of his contract with Energie Cottbus citing family reasons. He captained the club in the 2018–19 season and made 18 appearances in the first half of the season. He made 96 matches for the side, in which he contributed 13 goals and 7 assists.

On 25 January 2019, Stein then joined the reserve team of VfB Stuttgart on a contract until June 2021.
