= Elia Soriano =

Italian-German footballer (born 1989)

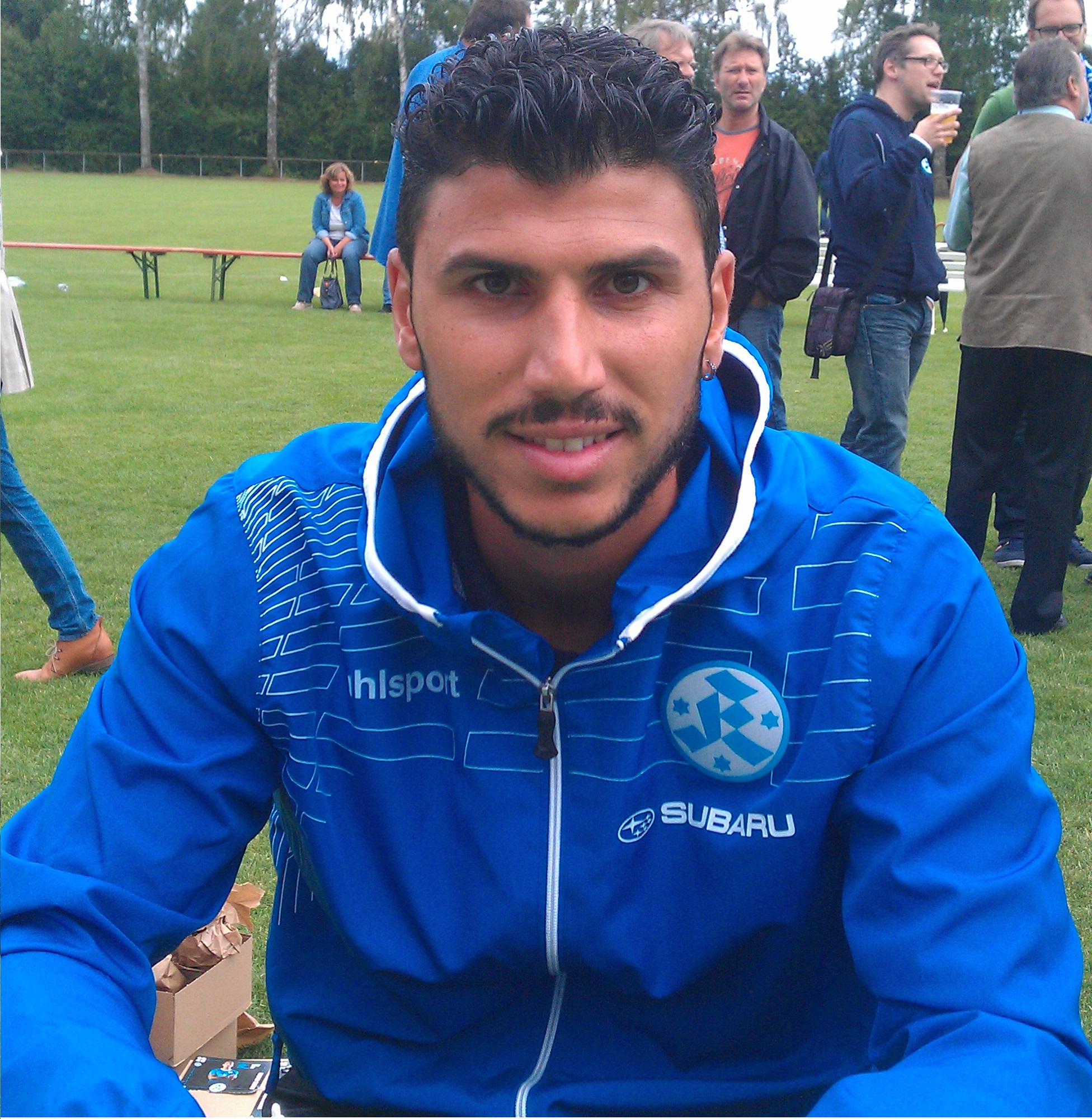
- Soriano in 2014

Personal information
- Date of birth: 26 June 1989 (age 37)
- Place of birth: Darmstadt, West Germany
- Height: 1.84 m (6 ft 0 in)
- Position: Striker

Youth career
- TSG 1846 Darmstadt
- –2007: Darmstadt 98

Senior career*
Years	Team	Apps	(Gls)
2007–2010	Darmstadt 98	83	(32)
2010–2011	VfR Aalen	12	(0)
2011–2012	Eintracht Frankfurt II	43	(25)
2012–2013	Karlsruher SC	13	(1)
2013–2015	Stuttgarter Kickers	71	(17)
2016–2017	Würzburger Kickers	46	(13)
2017–2019	Korona Kielce	55	(19)
2019–2020	VVV-Venlo	16	(2)
2020	Hapoel Ra'anana	1	(0)
2020–2022	Kickers Offenbach	41	(11)
- * Club domestic league appearances and goals as of 22:52, 19 September 2022 (UTC)

Elia Soriano (born 26 June 1989) is an Italian-German professional footballer who most recently played as a striker for Kickers Offenbach. He is the older brother of Roberto Soriano.
