= Maike =

Maike is a given name. Notable people with the given name include:

- Maike Arlt (born 1963), German volleyball player
- Maike Becker (born 1962), German handball player
- Maike Evers (born 1980), Australian real estate professional and television personality
- Maike Jakob (born 2005), German sprint canoeist
- Maike Kohl-Richter (born 1964), the second wife of former German Chancellor Helmut Kohl
- Maike van Niekerk, Canadian activist and entrepreneur
- Maike Nollen (born 1977), German sprint canoeist
- Maike Schaunig (born 1996), German field hockey player
- Maike Schirmer (born 1990), German handball player
- Maike Stöckel (born 1984), German field hockey player
