= Stadion an der Kreuzeiche =

Multi-use stadium in Reutlingen, Germany

Coordinates: 48°28′43″N 9°11′24″E

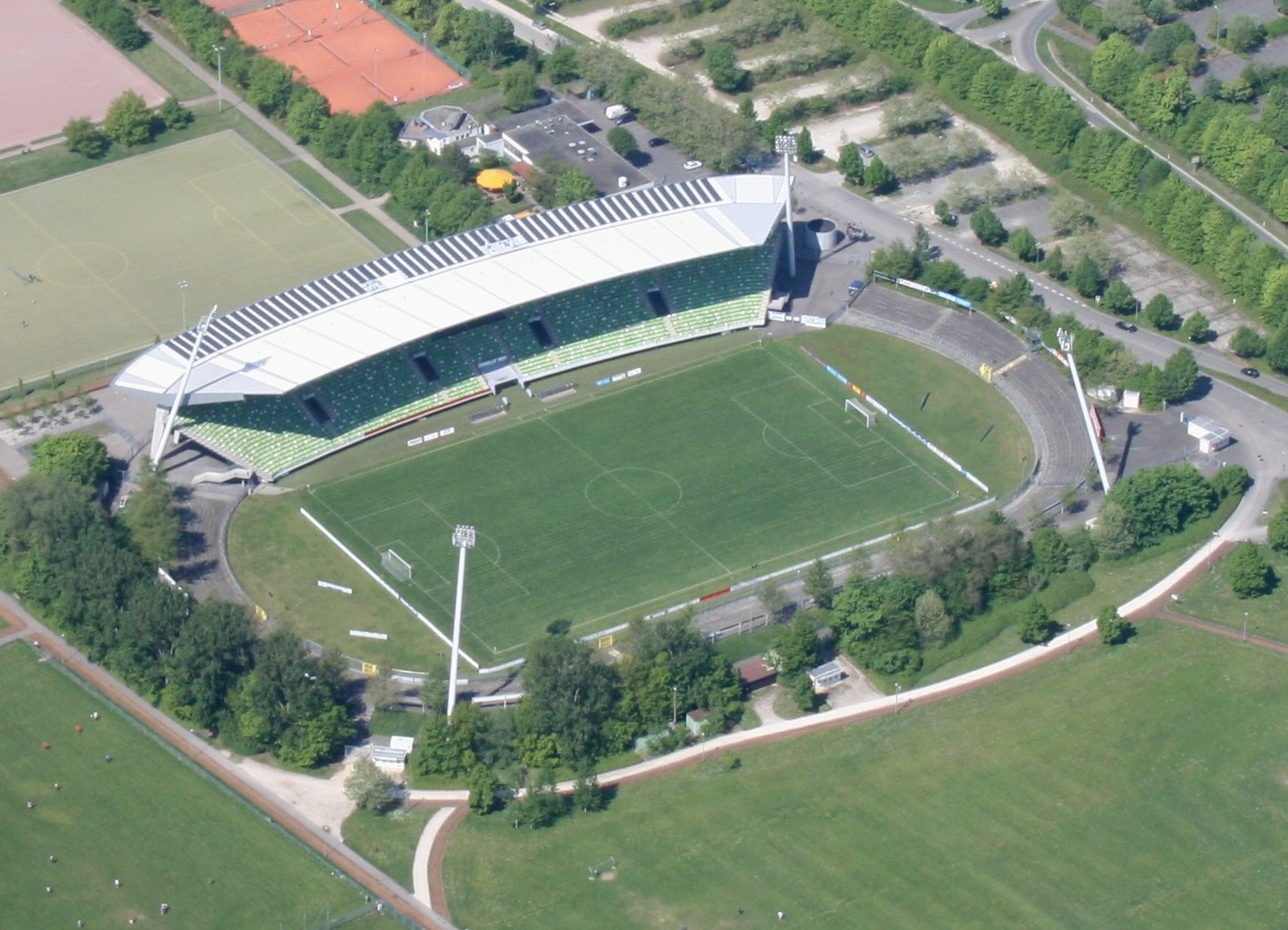
- Interactive map of Stadion an der Kreuzeiche
- Location: Reutlingen, Germany
- Capacity: 15,228

Construction
- Opened: 1953
- Renovated: 2002

Tenant
- SSV Reutlingen 05

Stadion an der Kreuzeiche is a multi-use stadium in Reutlingen, Germany. It is used mostly for football matches and is the home stadium of SSV Reutlingen. The stadium is able to hold 15,228 people and was opened in 1953. It was a venue of the 2016 UEFA European Under-19 Championship where two matches of the group stage where played.
