= Gerrit Müller =

German footballer

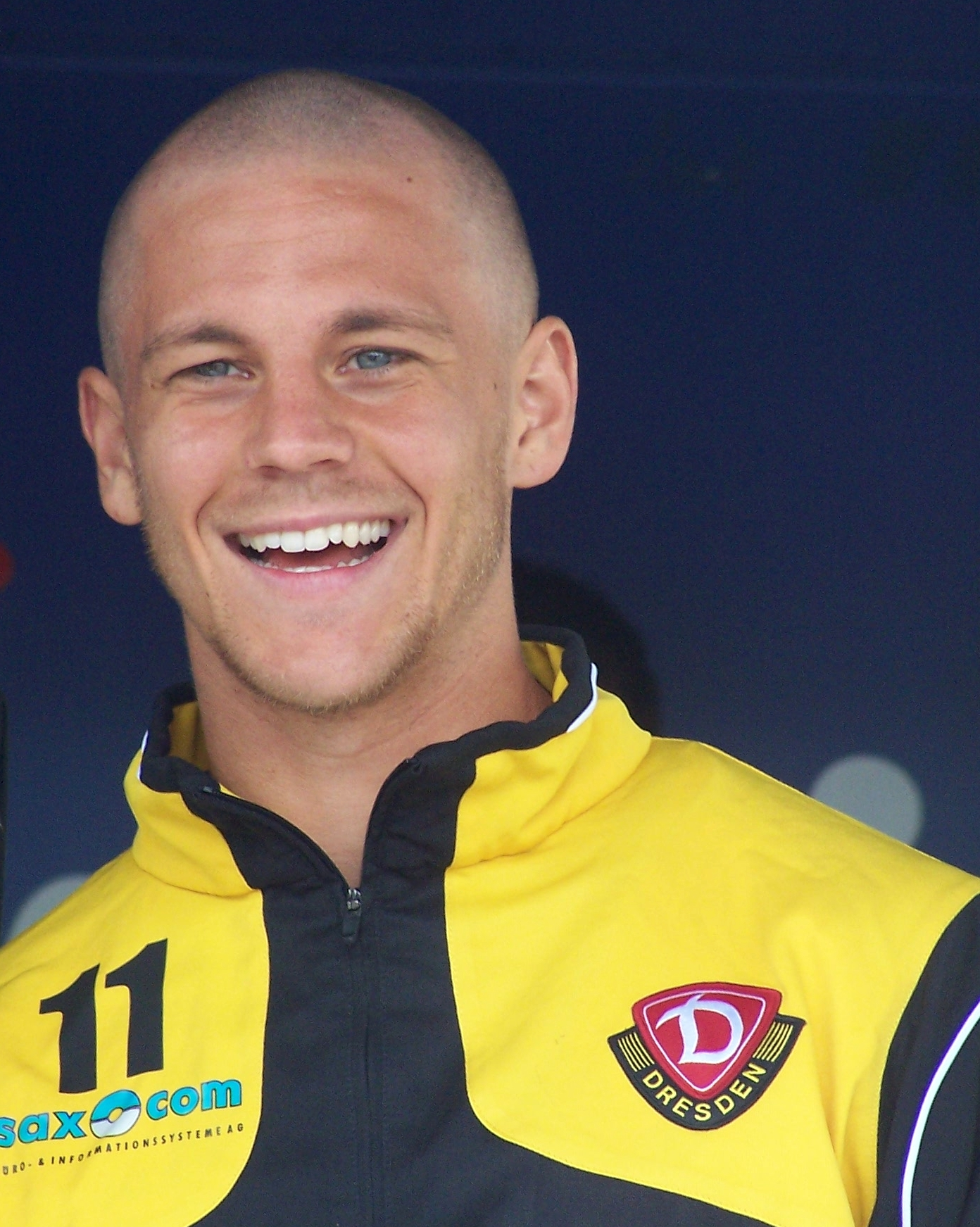
- Müller with Dynamo Dresden

Personal information
- Date of birth: 26 April 1984 (age 42)
- Place of birth: Schwetzingen, West Germany
- Height: 1.72 m (5 ft 8 in)
- Positions: Attacking midfielder; winger

Youth career
- 1999–2003: VfB Stuttgart

Senior career*
Years	Team	Apps	(Gls)
2003–2005	VfB Stuttgart II	41	(5)
2005–2007	Karlsruher SC II	17	(3)
2007–2008	Sportfreunde Siegen	32	(3)
2008–2012	Dynamo Dresden	85	(8)
2012–2013	1. FC Heidenheim	14	(0)
2013–2016	Stuttgarter Kickers	72	(8)
2016–2018	1. FC Magdeburg	12	(0)
Total		273	(27)
- * Club domestic league appearances and goals

Gerrit Müller (born 26 April 1984) is a German former professional footballer who played as a midfielder.
