= Fabian Gerster =

German footballer

Personal information
- Date of birth: December 29, 1986 (age 39)
- Place of birth: Bad Saulgau, West Germany
- Position: Right-back

Team information
- Current team: Stuttgarter Kickers
- Number: 17

Youth career
- FC Mengen
- –2000: SV Ennetach
- 2000–2004: SC Pfullendorf

Senior career*
Years	Team	Apps	(Gls)
2004–2009	SC Pfullendorf	87	(3)
2009–	Stuttgarter Kickers	164	(7)
- * Club domestic league appearances and goals as of 01:13, 26 May 2015 (UTC)

Fabian Gerster (born December 29, 1986) is a German former footballer who played for the Stuttgarter Kickers from 2009 to 2015. He was an outside defender. After retiring from football, he was a sports analyst at Quattrex Sports AG. In 2017, he became an assistant coach for SpVgg 07 Ludwigsburg.
