= Lhadji Badiane =

French footballer (born 1987)

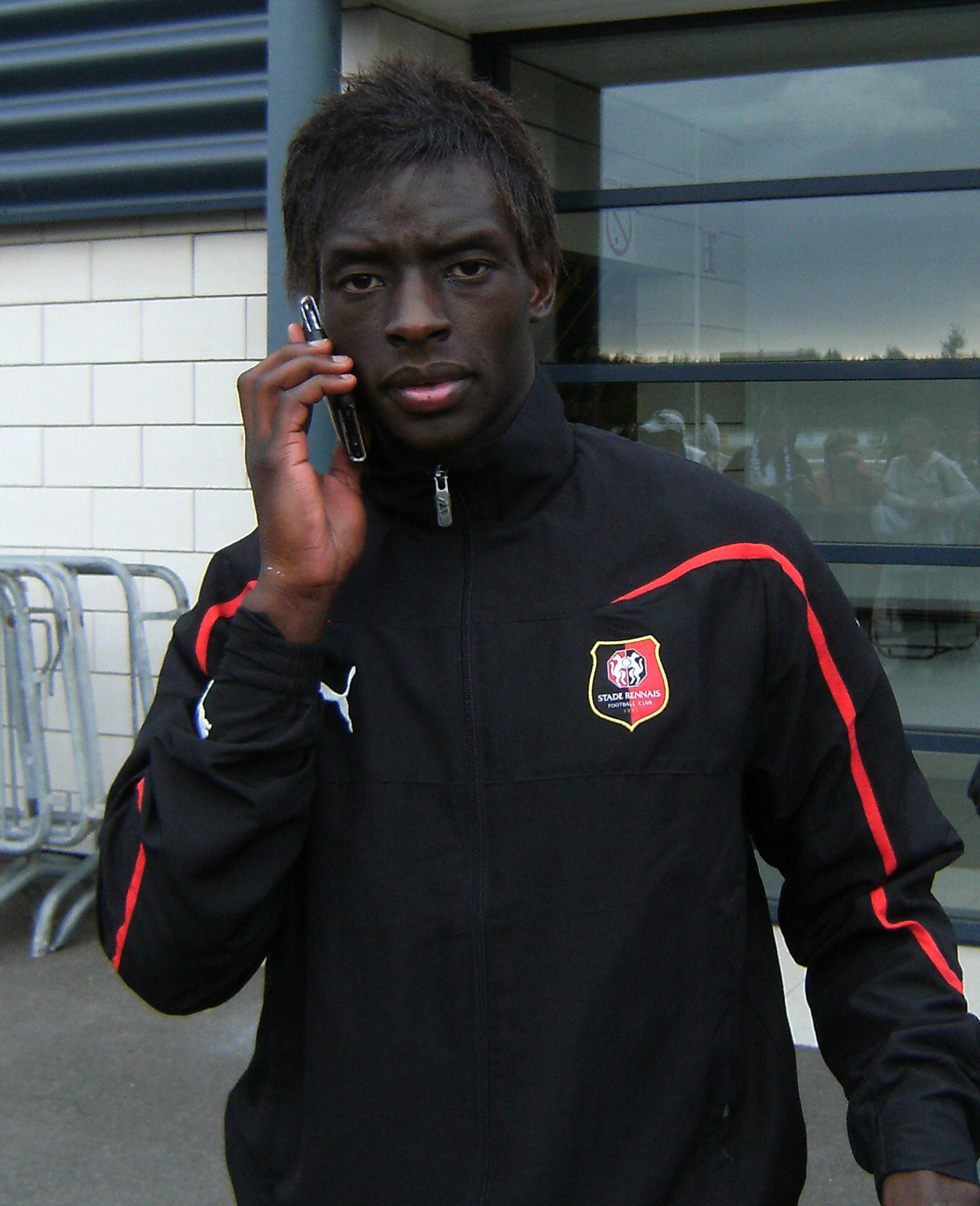
- Badiane in July 2010

Personal information
- Date of birth: 16 April 1987 (age 39)
- Place of birth: Strasbourg, France
- Height: 1.79 m (5 ft 10 in)
- Position: Striker

Youth career
- 2000–2002: FC Cronenbourg
- 2002–2004: SC Schiltigheim
- 2004–2005: Gueugnon
- 2005–2007: Rennes

Senior career*
| Years | Team | Apps | (Gls) |
| 2007–2011 | Rennes | 5 | (0) |
| 2008–2009 | → Clermont (loan) | 34 | (5) |
| 2010 | Rennes B | 2 | (0) |
| 2010–2011 | → Dijon (loan) | 19 | (1) |
| 2011–2013 | Laval | 11 | (2) |
| 2013–2016 | Stuttgarter Kickers | 73 | (12) |
| 2016–2017 | Berliner AK 07 | 8 | (0) |
| 2017–2019 | Stuttgarter Kickers | 39 | (8) |
| 2019–2020 | Laval | 13 | (1) |
| 2020–2021 | Oberachern | | |
- * Club domestic league appearances and goals as of 16:18, 14 December 2020 (UTC)

Lhadji Badiane (born 16 April 1987) is a French professional footballer who plays as a striker.

== Career ==
Arriving at Stade Rennais in 2005, Badiane played at the professional level of football in France for six seasons, with Stade Rennais, Clermont Foot, Dijon FCO and Stade Lavallois, making five appearances in Ligue 1 and 64 in Ligue 2 between 2007 and 2013. He made his debut at this level on 19 August 2007 in the Ligue 1 match between OGC Nice and Stade Rennais, coming on as a second-half substitute.

After injury kept him out of the 2012–13 season, he was released by Laval and later signed for German 3. Liga side Stuttgart Kickers, where he spent three seasons. When Stuttgart Kickers were relegated to the fourth tier at the end of the 2015–16 season, he moved to another club at that level, Berliner AK 07. He returned to Stuttgart Kickers in January 2017, and played out another season and a half at the club.

In July 2019, Badiane returned to France with his former club Laval, signing a one-year deal, with an optional extra year should promotion be achieved. He left the club at the end of the 2019–20 season, signing for German Oberliga Baden-Württemberg (fifth tier) side Oberachern.
