= Maik Baumgarten =

German footballer

Personal information
- Date of birth: 26 April 1993 (age 33)
- Place of birth: Eisenach, Germany
- Height: 1.79 m (5 ft 10 in)
- Position: Central midfielder

Team information
- Current team: FC An der Fahner Höhe
- Number: 14

Youth career
- ESV Gerstungen
- –2010: Rot-Weiß Erfurt

Senior career*
Years	Team	Apps	(Gls)
2010–2015	Rot-Weiß Erfurt	56	(1)
2015–2016	Hansa Rostock	13	(1)
2016–2017	Rot-Weiß Erfurt	6	(0)
2018–2019	Hessen Kassel	19	(1)
2020–	FC An der Fahner Höhe	44	(4)
- * Club domestic league appearances and goals as of 13 November 2022

Maik Baumgarten (born 26 April 1993) is a German footballer who played for NOFV-Oberliga Süd club FC An der Fahner Höhe. career

He made his senior debut for Rot-Weiß Erfurt in December 2010, as a substitute for Denis-Danso Weidlich in a 4–0 win over VfR Aalen. He scored his first goal for Hansa Rostock on 19 December 2015, with a stunning 25 yard curving dipping strike, against Chemnitzer FC.
