= Maik Odenthal =

German footballer

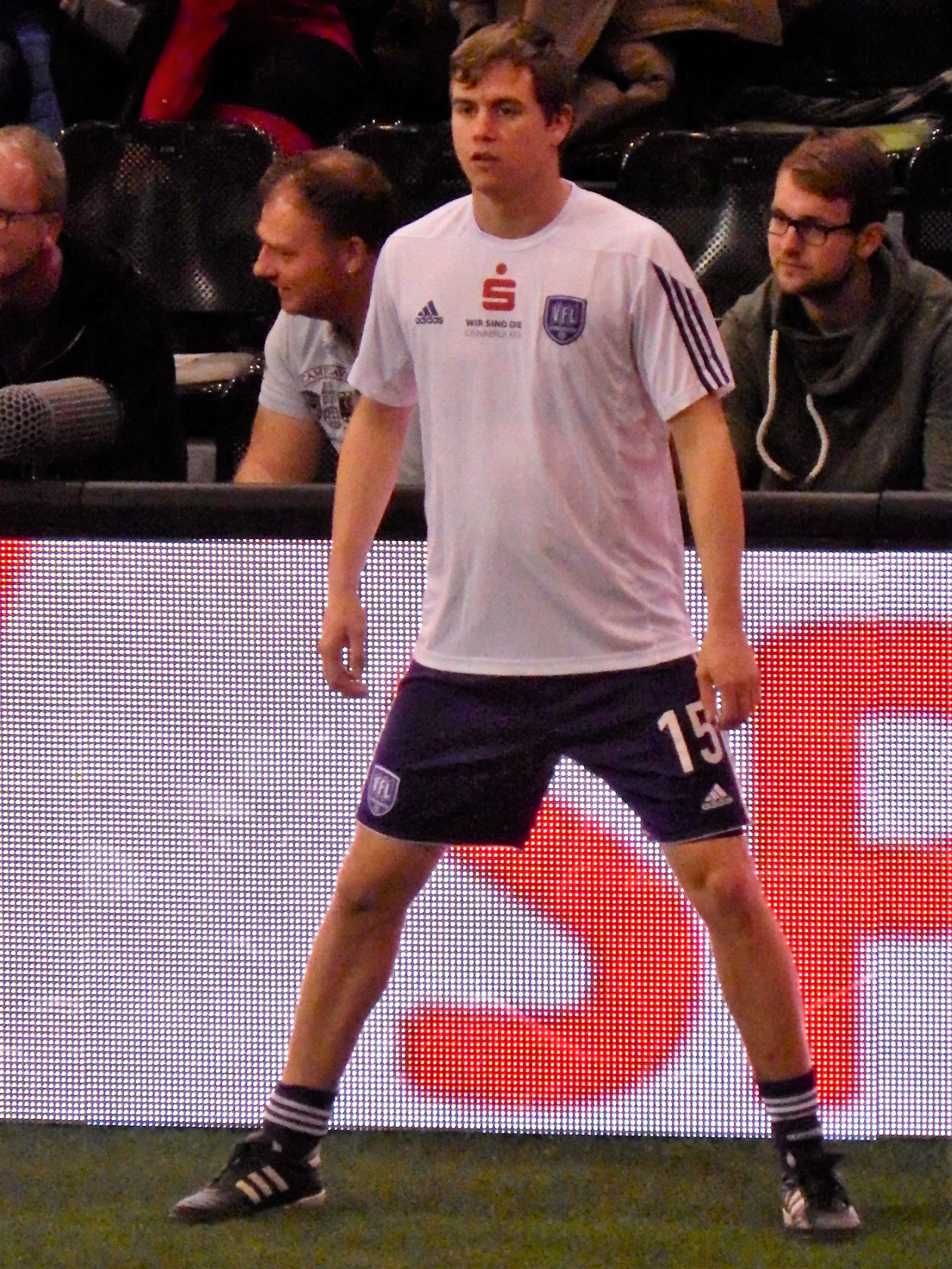
- Odenthal in 2016

Personal information
- Full name: Maik Odenthal
- Date of birth: 7 November 1992 (age 33)
- Place of birth: Grevenbroich, Germany
- Height: 1.89 m (6 ft 2 in)
- Position: Midfielder

Team information
- Current team: KFC Uerdingen
- Number: 15

Youth career
- SG Frimmersdorf-Neurath
- 1. FC Grevenbroich-Süd
- BV Wevelinghoven
- SC Kapellen-Erft
- Bedburger BV
- –2011: Bonner SC

Senior career*
Years	Team	Apps	(Gls)
2011	Bonner SC II	4	(2)
2011–2014	Borussia Mönchengladbach II	89	(5)
2014–2016	VfL Osnabrück	15	(1)
2014–2016	VfL Osnabrück II	22	(14)
2016–2022	Rot-Weiß Oberhausen	154	(21)
2022–	KFC Uerdingen	0	(0)
- * Club domestic league appearances and goals as of 05:27, 7 January 2019 (UTC)

Maik Odenthal (born 7 November 1992) is a German footballer who plays as a midfielder for KFC Uerdingen 05.

== Career ==
Odenthal made his professional debut for VfL Osnabrück in the 3. Liga on 26 August 2014, coming on as a substitute in the 90+2nd minute for Milad Salem in the 1–0 away win against Fortuna Köln.
