= SSV Reutlingen 05 =

Association football club in Germany

- Full name: Sport- und Schwimmverein Reutlingen 05 e.V.
- Nickname: Die Nullfünfer (The 05s)
- Founded: 9 May 1905
- Ground: Stadion an der Kreuzeiche
- Capacity: 15,228
- Chairman: Sascha Schneider
- Head coach: Alexander Strehmel
- League: Oberliga Baden-Württemberg (V)
- 2025–26: Oberliga Baden-Württemberg, 8th of 18
- Website: http://www.ssv-reutlingen.de/
Home colours	Away colours

SSV Reutlingen 05 is a German association football club from Reutlingen, Baden-Württemberg.

== History ==
The club was founded as FC Arminia Reutlingen and was renamed SV Reutlingen 1905 in 1910. The club merged with 1. Schwimmverein 1911 to form the current side in 1938.

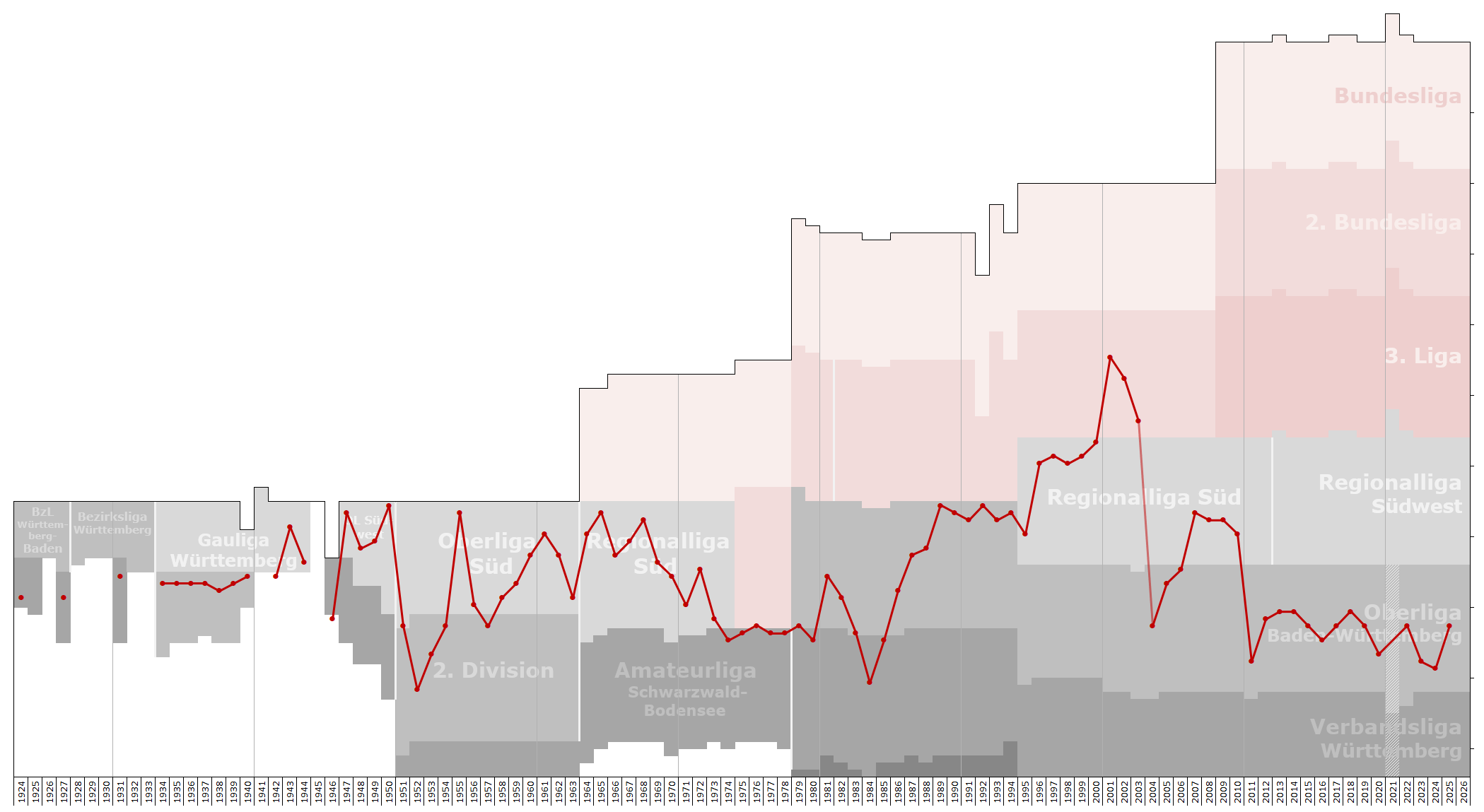
Historical chart of Reutlingen league performance

Reutlingen became a decent regional side in the years after World War II, two second-place finishes in the Oberliga (I) in 1950 and 1955 being the highlight, and earned a place in the second tier Regionalliga Süd in 1963 when Germany's new top flight professional league, the Bundesliga, was formed. After a second-place finish in their division in 1965, SSV took part in the Bundesliga promotion rounds, where they faced Bayern Munich and Borussia Mönchengladbach for the right to make their Bundesliga début. Reutlingen were held to a 1–1 draw against Mönchengladbach on their home ground, but were crushed 7–0 away, and finished a point behind them in their group.

Reutlingen continued to play second division football until the early 1970s when they dropped into the Amateur Oberliga Baden-Württemberg (III), briefly even falling to fourth-tier Verbandsliga Württemberg. They spent most of the next two-and-a-half decades at the third level before playing their way back to the second tier on the strength of a first-place finish in their division that began with a sixteen-game winning streak to open the season. Their three-year adventure in the 2. Bundesliga ended in 2003 after the team was penalised six points for financial irregularities the previous year. They were then denied a licence to play in the third division Regionalliga Süd and were forced down to Oberliga Baden-Württemberg (IV).

The team finished in first place in the Oberliga Baden-Württemberg in 2005–06 and returned to the Regionalliga Süd (III) for the 2006–07 season. SSV remained in the third division for two years, narrowly missing promotion into the newly formed 3. Liga at the end of the 2007–08 campaign. Without a place in this new national league, the Nullfünfer remained in the Regionalliga Süd, now as a fourth-tier side.

The 2008–09 and 2009–10 seasons saw SSV finish in the middle of the Regionalliga Süd table with early exits from the WFV-Pokal in both campaigns. After finishing in 14th position in the Regionalliga Süd in the 2009–10 season, the team was denied a licence to continue playing in the fourth division due to financial insolvency. SSV have competed in the fifth-tier Oberliga Baden-Württemberg since the 2010–11 season.

The club won the 2014–15 edition of the Württemberg Cup, defeating FV Ravensburg in the final, and thereby qualified for the first round of the 2015–16 DFB-Pokal. Here they beat their local rivals Karlsruher SC 3–1 at the Kreuzeiche with three penalties from their captain, Giuseppe Ricciardi. In the second round, SSV lost 4–0 against another team from the 2. Bundesliga, Eintracht Braunschweig.

== Current squad ==
As of 7 October 2025

Note: Flags indicate national team as defined under FIFA eligibility rules; some limited exceptions apply. Players may hold more than one non-FIFA nationality.

No.	Pos.	Nation	Player
1	GK	GER	Marcel Binanzer
3	DF	GER	Jonathan Hageloch
4	DF	GER	Sladan Puseljic
5	MF	GER	Yannick Toth
6	DF	GER	Tim Wöhrle
7	FW	GER	Jonas Meiser
8	MF	GER	Marlon Gangloff
9	FW	GRE	Konstantinos Markopoulos
10	MF	GER	Riccardo Gorgoglione
11	MF	GER	Leander Vochatzer
12	MF	GER	Lino Kuhn
13	MF	GER	Johannes Wally
14	FW	GER	Maxim Schmalz
15	FW	GER	Noah-Elias Maurer

No.	Pos.	Nation	Player
16	FW	GER	Elia Reichardt
17	DF	GER	Moritz Kuhn
18	DF	GER	Ben Schaal
19	FW	GER	Willie Sauerborn
20	DF	GER	Philipp Majewski
21	DF	GER	Luca Plattenhardt
23	MF	MNE	Nedim Pepic
24	MF	GER	Jonah Adrovic
27	FW	GER	Tom Ruzicka
28	DF	GER	Jonas Vogler
30	GK	GER	Louis Seeger
33	GK	GER	Dominik Hozlinger
—	DF	GER	Manuel Walz

== Honours ==
The club's honours:

=== League ===
- German amateur football championship
  - Champions: (2) 1974, 1997
- Oberliga Südwest (I)
  - Runners-up: 1950
- Oberliga Süd (I)
  - Runners-up: 1955
- 2nd Oberliga Süd (II)
  - Runners-up: (2) 1954, 1957
- Regionalliga Süd (II) ^{‡}
  - Runners-up: 1965
- Regionalliga Süd (III) ^{‡}
  - Champions: 2000
- Oberliga Baden-Württemberg (III-IV)
  - Champions: (3) 1989, 1992, 2006
- Verbandsliga Württemberg (IV)
  - Champions: 1985
- Amateurliga Schwarzwald-Bodensee (III)
  - Champions: (3) 1975, 1977, 1978

=== Cup ===
- Württemberg Cup
  - Winners: (4) 1988, 1990, 1999, 2015
  - Runners-up: (3) 1969, 1991, 1995

- ^{‡} There has been two separate incarnations of the Regionalliga Süd, one existing from 1963 to 1974 and the other from 1994 to 2012.

== Recent managers ==
Recent managers of the club:

Manager	Start	Finish
Armin Veh	1 July 1998	12 December 2001
Reiner Geyer	12 December 2001	30 June 2002
Frank Wormuth	1 July 2002	4 May 2003
Uwe Erkenbrecher	5 May 2003	30 June 2004
Peter Starzmann	1 July 2004	30 June 2008
Roland Seitz	1 July 2008	15 April 2010
Stefan Minkwitz	16 April 2010	30 April 2010
Lothar Mattner	1 July 2010	24 November 2011
Denis Lapaczinski	28 November 2011	31 December 2011
Murat Isik	1 December 2012	13 October 2014
Robert Hofacker	14 October 2014	6 May 2015
Andreas Rill	7 May 2015	30 June 2015
Georgi Donkov	1 July 2015	4 April 2016
Jochen Class	8 April 2016	present

== Recent seasons ==
The recent season-by-season performance of the club:

Season	Division	Tier	Position
1999–2000	Regionalliga Süd	III	1st ↑
2000–01	2. Bundesliga	II	7th
2001–02	2. Bundesliga	II	10th
2002–03	2. Bundesliga	II	16th ↓
2003–04	Oberliga Baden-Württemberg	IV	9th
2004–05	Oberliga Baden-Württemberg	IV	3rd
2005–06	Oberliga Baden-Württemberg	IV	1st ↑
2006–07	Regionalliga Süd	III	11th
2007–08	Regionalliga Süd	III	12th
2008–09	Regionalliga Süd	IV	12th
2009–10	Regionalliga Süd	IV	18th ↓
2010–11	Oberliga Baden-Württemberg	V	14th
2011–12	Oberliga Baden-Württemberg	V	8th
2012–13	Oberliga Baden-Württemberg	V	7th
2013–14	Oberliga Baden-Württemberg	V	7th
2014–15	Oberliga Baden-Württemberg	V	9th
2015–16	Oberliga Baden-Württemberg	V	11th
2016–17	Oberliga Baden-Württemberg	V	9th
2017–18	Oberliga Baden-Württemberg	V	7th
2018–19	Oberliga Baden-Württemberg	V	9th

- With the introduction of the Regionalligas in 1994 and the 3. Liga in 2008 as the new third tier, below the 2. Bundesliga, all leagues below dropped one tier.

↑ Promoted	↓ Relegated
