= Stuttgarter Kickers II =

German football reserve team

- Full name: Sportverein Stuttgarter Kickers e.V. II
- Nickname: Die kleinen Blauen (The little Blues)
- Founded: 21 September 1899; 126 years ago
- Dissolved: 30 June 2017; 8 years ago
- Ground: Bezirkssportanlage Waldau
- Capacity: 2,000
- Website: http://www.stuttgarter-kickers.de/
Home colours	Away colours	Third colours

Stuttgarter Kickers II (also known as Stuttgarter Kickers Amateure or Stuttgarter Kickers U-23) was the reserve team of German football club Stuttgarter Kickers.

The Stuttgarter Kickers II played in the Oberliga Baden-Württemberg beginning in 2000. Previously, the team fluctuated between the Landesliga and Verbandsliga Württemberg. The team was intended to be the final step between Stuttgart's youth setup and the first team, and was usually made up of promising youngsters between the age of 18 and 23, with a few veteran players drafted in to provide experience.

== History ==
The team first earned promotion to the highest league in the region, the tier three Amateurliga Nordwürttemberg, in 1969 and played there for four seasons until 1973 when it was relegated again. It made one more return to this league in 1975–76 but was relegated again and did not return until the league was disbanded in 1978. Instead it became part of the new tier four Verbandsliga Württemberg that year where it played until 1987 with two second places in 1982 and 1983 as its best results.

After three seasons in the Landesliga the team returned to the Verbandsliga in 1990, came second in the league in 1990–91 and earned promotion to the Oberliga Baden-Württemberg for the first time. The team lasted for only one season and suffered consecutive relegations, dropping back into the Landesliga in 1993. After another three seasons in the Landesliga the team returned to the Verbandsliga in 1996. After four seasons in the Verbandsliga it won a second promotion to the Oberliga in 2000 and played at this level with a sixth place in 2010–11 as its best result. Kickers dissolved the team at the end of the 2016–17 season.

== Stadium ==
The Stuttgarter Kickers II played at the Bezirkssportanlage Waldau in Stuttgart-Degerloch and sometimes at the ADM-Sportpark.

== Honours ==
The club's honours:

- Verbandsliga Württemberg
  - Runners-up: (4) 1982, 1983, 1991, 2000

=== Head coaches since 1994 ===
From	Until	Name
1995-07-01	1998-11-18	(Germany) Klaus Steinle
1998-11-18	1999-06-30	(Germany) Ralf Vollmer
1999-01-07	2001-06-30	(Germany) Marcus Sorg
2001-07-01	2002-06-30	(Germany) Thomas Letsch
2002-07-01	2003-10-27	(Germany) Robin Dutt
2003-10-27	2012-08-09	(Germany) Björn Hinck
2012-08-09	2012-08-13	(Germany) Joachim Schlosser
2012-08-13	2015-06-30	(Germany) Jürgen Hartmann
2015-07-01	2016-06-30	(Germany) Alfred Kaminski
2016-07-01	2017-06-30	(Germany) Dieter Märkle

== Seasons ==
Last seasons of the team:

Season	Division	Tier	Position
1999–2000	Verbandsliga Württemberg	V	2nd↑
2000–01	Oberliga Baden-Württemberg	IV	11th
2001–02	Oberliga Baden-Württemberg	IV	8th
2002–03	Oberliga Baden-Württemberg	IV	7th
2003–04	Oberliga Baden-Württemberg	IV	12th
2004–05	Oberliga Baden-Württemberg	IV	10th
2005–06	Oberliga Baden-Württemberg	IV	13th
2006–07	Oberliga Baden-Württemberg	IV	9th
2007–08	Oberliga Baden-Württemberg	IV	15th
2008–09	Oberliga Baden-Württemberg	V	7th
2009–10	Oberliga Baden-Württemberg	V	12th
2010–11	Oberliga Baden-Württemberg	V	6th
2011–12	Oberliga Baden-Württemberg	V	15th
2012–13	Oberliga Baden-Württemberg	V	14th
2013–14	Oberliga Baden-Württemberg	V	10th
2014–15	Oberliga Baden-Württemberg	V	14th
2015–16	Oberliga Baden-Württemberg	V	12th
2016–17	Oberliga Baden-Württemberg	V	14th

=== Key ===
↑Promoted	↓ Relegated
