= 2023–24 Fenerbahçe S.K. season =

Fenerbahçe
2023–24 season
- President: Ali Koç
- Head coach: İsmail Kartal
- Stadium: Şükrü Saracoğlu Stadium
- Süper Lig: 2nd
- Turkish Cup: Quarter-finals
- Turkish Super Cup: Runners-up
- UEFA Europa Conference League: Quarter-finals
- Top goalscorer: League: Edin Džeko (21); All: Edin Džeko (25)
- Highest home attendance: 45,401 (vs. Galatasaray, 24 December 2023, Süper Lig)
- Lowest home attendance: 23,853 (vs. Kayserispor, 12 May 2024, Süper Lig)
- Average home league attendance: 38,210
- Biggest win: 7–1 (vs. Konyaspor (H), 10 January 2024, Süper Lig); 6–0 (vs. Adanaspor (H), 17 January 2024, Turkish Cup)
- Biggest defeat: 1–6 (vs. Nordsjælland (A), 30 November 2023, UEFA Europa Conference League)
Home colours	Away colours	Third colours

The 2023–24 season was the 117th season in the existence of Fenerbahçe S.K. and the club's 66th consecutive season in the top flight of Turkish football. In addition to the domestic league, Fenerbahçe participated in this season's edition of the Turkish Cup, Turkish Super Cup and UEFA Europa Conference League.

== Club ==
=== Board of directors ===
Position	Staff
Chairman	(Turkey) Ali Koç
Deputy Chairman	(Turkey) Erol Bilecik
General Secretary	(Turkey) Burak Çağlan Kızılhan
Board Member	(Turkey) Mehmet Dereli
Board Member	(Turkey) Fethi Pekin
Board Member	(Turkey) Acar Sertaç Komsuoğlu
Board Member	(Turkey) Simla Türker Bayazıt
Board Member	(Turkey) Hüseyin Arslan
Board Member	(Turkey) Esin Güral Argat
Board Member	(Turkey) Ahmet Ketenci
Board Member	(Turkey) Mustafa Kemal Danabaş
Board Member	(Turkey) Selma Altay Rodopman
Board Member	(Turkey) Ömer Okan
Board Member	(Turkey) Selahattin Baki
Board Member	(Turkey) Bekir İrdem

Last updated: 14 April 2023
Source: Fenerbahce.org

=== Staff ===
Position	Staff
Sporting Director	(Portugal) Mário Branco
Assistant Sporting Director	(Turkey) Okan Özkan
Administrative Manager	(Turkey) Emir Yolaç
Head Coach	(Turkey) İsmail Kartal
Technical Manager	(Turkey) Mehmet Aurélio
Assistant Coach	(Turkey) Recep Karatepe
Assistant Coach	(Turkey) Kemal Kurak
Assistant Coach	(Turkey) Sercan Terzioğlu
Assistant Coach	(Turkey) Zeki Murat Göle
Athletic Performance Coach	(Turkey) Cengiz Sirkan
Athletic Performance Coach	(Turkey) Cihan Mert Cengiz
Goalkeeping Coach	(Turkey) Haluk Kaplan
Goalkeeping Coach	(Croatia) Sandro Žufić
Goalkeeping Coach	(Turkey) Yasin Cirav
Analysis Specialist	(Turkey) Melikşah Sezgin
Analyst	(Turkey) Kerem Güneş
Analyst	(Turkey) Mehmet Turhan Demir
Doctor	(Turkey) Dr. Osman İlhan
Doctor	(Turkey) Dr. Ertuğrul Karanlık
Media Officer	(Turkey) Alper Yemeniciler
Interpreter	(Turkey) Sinan Levi
Interpreter	(Turkey) Saruhan Karaman
Physiotherapist	(Turkey) Umut Şahin
Physiotherapist	(Turkey) Bülent Uyar
Physiotherapist	(Turkey) Ata Özgür Ercan
Nutritionist	(Turkey) Şengül Sangu Talak
Masseur	(Turkey) Özkan Alaca
Masseur	(Turkey) Veysel Çabşek
Masseur	(Turkey) Muhammed Fatih Yeniay
Masseur	(Turkey) Eyüp Emre Yeşiller
Material Manager	(Turkey) Dursun Çetin
Material Manager	(Turkey) Cemil Bulut
Material Manager	(Turkey) Sefa Eroğlu

Last updated: 2 July 2023
Source: Fenerbahce.org

=== Facilities ===
Position	Staff
Stadium	(Turkey) Şükrü Saracoğlu Stadium
Training facility	(Turkey) Lefter Küçükandonyadis Facilities
Training facility	(Turkey) Faruk Ilgaz Facilities
Training facility	(Turkey) Düzce Topuk Yaylası Facilities
Training facility	(Turkey) Can Bartu Facilities
Training facility	(Turkey) Fikirtepe Facilities

Last updated: 14 April 2023
Source: Fenerbahce.org

== Kits ==
Fenerbahçe's 2023–24 home kit, manufactured by Puma, was unveiled and debuted on 11 June 2023, in the 2023 Turkish Cup final, and was up for sale on the same day. Away and third kits released on 20 June 2023.

- Supplier: Puma
- Main sponsor: Otokoç
- Back sponsor: Halley
- Sleeve sponsor: Nesine.com, Safiport
- Shorts sponsor: Aygaz, Pürsu, Pasha Group
- Socks sponsor: Gedik Yatırım

Home
Home alt.
Away
Away alt.
Third
Third alt.
Goalkeeper 1
Goalkeeper 2
Goalkeeper 3

== Season overview ==
=== Pre-season ===
On 11 June, after the conclusion of the 2023 Turkish Cup final, Jorge Jesus announced that he would leave Fenerbahçe.

On 12 June, Ryan Kent signed from Rangers on a contract until 2027.

On 12 June, Enner Valencia transferred to Internacional after his contract expired.

On 14 June, Bruma was sold to Braga.

On 15 June, İrfan Can Eğribayat was transferred from Göztepe permanently and signed a contract with the club until 2027.

On 21 June, the UEFA Europa Conference League second qualifying round draw was drawn. Fenerbahçe will play with the winners of the 8th match of the first qualifying round.

On 22 June, Edin Džeko signed from Inter Milan on a contract until 2025.

On 28 June, İsmail Kartal signed for his third managerial spell with Fenerbahçe on a contract until 2024.

On 29 June, Fenerbahçe's preparation schedule for the 2023–24 season was announced. The team started working at the Samandıra Can Bartu Facilities on 2 July, continuing their work in Istanbul until 8 July. The team then participated in the Pari Premier Cup tournament in Saint Petersburg, Russia, between 9–15 July to face Zenit Saint Petersburg, Red Star Belgrade and Neftçi, respectively.

On 2 July, Fenerbahçe announced that Dimitrios Pelkas and Ezgjan Alioski left the team after their contracts expired, while Mërgim Berisha transferred to FC Augsburg.

On 2 July, Fenerbahçe started its preparations for the 2023–24 season with training at Samandıra Can Bartu Facilities.

On 3 July, Ertuğrul Çetin transferred to Gençlerbirliği on loan until the end of the season.

On 4 July, Fenerbahçe announced that Mário Branco was appointed as the sporting director.

On 6 July, Fenerbahçe agreed to sell Arda Güler to Real Madrid for €20 million + add-ons that could reach up to €10 million and a 20% sell-on clause.

On 7 July, Fenerbahçe announced that they had reached an agreement with Beveren for the loan transfer of Tiago Çukur for one season.

On 9 July, Fenerbahce drew 0–0 with Zenit Saint Petersburg in the first match of the Pari Premier Cup, and was defeated 4–3 on penalty shoot-outs.

On 10 July, Alexander Djiku signed from Strasbourg on a contract until 2026.

On 11 July, Umut Nayir signed from Ümraniyespor on a contract until 2025.

On 12 July, Fenerbahçe announced the signing of Sebastian Szymański from Dynamo Moscow, penning a four-year contract with the player.

On 12 July, Fenerbahçe lost 1–3 against Red Star Belgrade, playing the second match of the Pari Premier Cup.

On 15 July, Fenerbahçe defeated Neftçi 1–0 in the third and final match of the Pari Premier Cup. Edin Džeko, who scored the only goal in the match, scored the first goal of his career in Fenerbahçe.

On 16 July, Dušan Tadić signed from Ajax on a contract until 2025.

On 17 July, Mbwana Samatta left the club to join PAOK on a permanent transfer.

On 18 July, Süper Lig 2023–24 season fixture has been announced. Fenerbahçe will play against Gaziantep in the first match of the new season.

On 20 July, Rodrigo Becão signed from Udinese on a contract until 2028.

On 20 July, Bartuğ Elmaz signed from Marseille on a contract until 2026.

On 24 July, Attila Szalai was sold to 1899 Hoffenheim.

=== July ===
On 26 July, Fenerbahçe defeated Zimbru Chișinău 5–0 in the first leg of the UEFA Europa Conference League second qualifying round.

=== August ===
On 1 August, Fenerbahçe defeated Zimbru Chișinău 4–0 in the second leg of the UEFA Europa Conference League second qualifying round. The team advanced to the third qualifying round with an aggregate score of 9–0 at the end of the two legs.

On 2 August, Fenerbahçe extended Miha Zajc contract for three years.

On 2 August, Mert Müldür signed from Sassuolo on a contract until 2027.

On 2 August, Diego Rossi was sold to Columbus Crew.

On 2 August, João Pedro was loaned to Grêmio.

On 10 August, Fenerbahçe defeated Maribor 3–1 in the first leg of the UEFA Europa Conference League third qualifying round.

On 13 August, Fred signed from Manchester United on a contract until 2027.

On 13 August, Cengiz Ünder signed from Marseille on a contract until 2027.

On 13 August, Fenerbahçe defeated Gaziantep 2–1 at home. Goals from Edin Džeko ensured victory in their first Süper Lig match of the season.

On 16 August, Omar Fayed signed from Al Mokawloon Al Arab on a contract until 2027.

On 17 August, Willian Arão was sold to Panathinaikos.

On 17 August, Fenerbahçe defeated Maribor 3–0 in the second leg of the UEFA Europa Conference League third qualifying round. The team advanced to the play-off round with an aggregate score of 6–1 at the end of the two legs.

On 21 August, Fenerbahçe secured their consecutive second win of the Süper Lig by defeating Samsunspor 2–0 away from home, with goals from Edin Džeko and Sebastian Szymański.

On 22 August, Gustavo Henrique was sold to Real Valladolid.

On 24 August, Fenerbahçe defeated Twente 5–1 in the first leg of the UEFA Europa Conference League play-off round with goals from Jayden Oosterwolde, Sebastian Szymański, İrfan Can Kahveci, and Dušan Tadić.

On 25 August, Dominik Livaković signed from Dinamo Zagreb on a contract until 2028.

On 26 August, Serdar Dursun was sold to Fatih Karagümrük.

On 31 August, Fenerbahçe defeated Twente 1–0 in the second leg of the UEFA Europa Conference League play-off round. The team advanced to the group stage with an aggregate score of 6–1 at the end of the two legs.

=== September ===
On 1 September, Altay Bayındır was sold to Manchester United.

On 3 September, a goal from Bright Osayi-Samuel secured three points for Fenerbahçe in a 1–0 win over Ankaragücü.

On 14 September, Fenerbahçe announced that the contract with Nazım Sangaré was terminated by mutual agreement.

On 15 September, Burak Kapacak transferred to Sivasspor on loan until the end of the season.

On 15 September, Omar Fayed and Jo Jin-ho transferred to Novi Pazar on loan until the end of the season.

On 15 September, Emre Demir transferred to Ümraniyespor on loan until the end of the season.

After the international break, on 17 September, goals from Edin Džeko, İrfan Kahveci and Sebastian Szymański earned Fenerbahçe a 3–2 home win over Antalyaspor, extending the team's winning run to five games.

On 21 September, goals from Miguel Crespo, Michy Batshuayi and Serdar Aziz secured Fenerbahçe a 3–1 win over Nordsjælland on the first matchday of the Europa Conference League.

On 24 September, Fenerbahçe registered a 1–0 away win at Alanyaspor, with the lone goal being scored by İrfan Kahveci in the forty third minute.

On 28 September, Fenerbahçe got a comfortable 4–0 win against İstanbul Başakşehir. Sebastian Szymański scored twice, Alexander Djiku scored a goal and the other goal was an own goal from İstanbul Başakşehir's defender Léo Duarte.

=== October ===
On 1 October, Fenerbahçe defeated Çaykur Rizespor 5–0 with the goals of Sebastian Szymański, İrfan Kahveci, Edin Džeko, Dušan Tadić, and Joshua King.

On 2 October, Fenerbahçe extended Miguel Crespo contract for one years.

On 6 October, Fenerbahçe won 2–1 against Spartak Trnava in Trnava on the second match day of the Europa Conference League, with Joshua King scoring both goals.

On 8 October, Fenerbahçe secured their consecutive eighth win of the Süper Lig by defeating Kasımpaşa 2–0 away from home, with goals from Edin Džeko and Dušan Tadić.

On 22 October, Fenerbahçe defeated Hatayspor 4–2 with the goals of Sebastian Szymański, Bright Osayi-Samuel, Edin Džeko and İrfan Kahveci. Fenerbahçe broke the record for the best start in the league with nine consecutive wins.

On 26 October, Fenerbahçe won 3–1 against Ludogorets Razgrad in home on the third match day of the Europa Conference League. Miha Zajc scored twice and Michy Batshuayi scored a goal.

On 29 October, Fenerbahçe defeated Pendikspor 5–0 away. Erdem Canpolat scored an own goal, İrfan Kahveci and Edin Džeko scored hat-tricks.

=== November ===
On 4 November, Fenerbahçe suffered its first defeat of the season at home to Trabzonspor with a score of 3–2. All of the team's goals were scored by Dušan Tadić with a penalty.

On 9 November, Fenerbahçe suffered its first defeat in the Europa Conference League after losing 2–0 away to Ludogorets Razgrad. Fenerbahçe could not score a goal in an official match for the first time this season.

On 12 November, Fenerbahçe's away game versus Adana Demirspor ended in a 0–0 stalemate.

After the international break, on 26 November, second-half goals from Dušan Tadić earned Fenerbahçe a 2–1 home win over Fatih Karagümrük.

On 30 November, Fenerbahçe lost 6–1 away to Nordsjælland in the fifth match day of the Europa Conference League. Michy Batshuayi scored Fenerbahçe's only goal. Fenerbahçe suffered its biggest defeat this season.

=== December ===
İsmail Kartal's side started the month with a win, beating Sivasspor 4–1 on 4 December, with goals from Sebastian Szymański, İrfan Kahveci, Edin Džeko and, as well as an own goal.

On 9 December, Edin Džeko, Dušan Tadić and Sebastian Szymański scored goals for a 3–1 away win against Beşiktaş in the derby.

On 14 December, Fenerbahçe produced a 4–0 home victory over Spartak Trnava in the Europa Conference League and advanced to the round of 16 as group winners. Edin Džeko scored twice, Ferdi Kadıoğlu scored a goal and the other goal was an own goal from Spartak Trnava's goalkeeper Dominik Takáč.

On 20 December, Fenerbahçe defeated Kayserispor 4–3 away. Cengiz Ünder scored one and Michy Batshuayi scored a hat-trick.

On 24 December, Fenerbahçe's home game versus Galatasaray in the Intercontinental Derby ended in a 0–0 stalemate.

=== January ===
On 7 January, Fenerbahçe defeated İstanbulspor 5–1 away. Cengiz Ünder scored 4 goals and Edin Džeko scored one.

Three days later, Fenerbahçe defeated Konyaspor 7–1 at home. They won the three points with a hattrick from Edin Džeko in the first half, a goal each from Mert Müldür and Sebastian Szymański, and a goal from Michy Batshuayi and an own goal from the opposing defense in the second half.

On 11 January, Leonardo Bonucci signed from Union Berlin on a contract until end of the season.

On 13 January, Rade Krunić arrived at the club on loan from Milan with an option to buy until the end of the season.

On 14 January, Samet Akaydin was loaned to Greek side Panathinaikos with an option to buy until the end of the season.

On 14 January, a goal from İrfan Kahveci secured three points for Fenerbahçe in a 1–0 win over Gaziantep.

On 15 January, Umut Nayir was loaned to Pendikspor until the end of the season.

On 17 January, four goals from Michy Batshuayi and one each from Lincoln and Mert Hakan Yandaş helped Fenerbahçe win 6–0 against Adanaspor in the Turkish Cup and progress to the round of 16.

On 21 January, Fenerbahçe took on Samsunspor, but was unable to take three points, as İrfan Kahveci's goal gave his team a 1–1 draw.

On 24 January, a goal from Michy Batshuayi secured three points for Fenerbahçe in a 1–0 win over İstanbul Başakşehir.

Four days later, a brace from Cengiz Ünder gave Fenerbahçe a 2–1 come-from-behind victory over Ankaragücü at home.

On 29 January, Çağlar Söyüncü arrived at the club on loan from Atlético Madrid until the end of the season.

On 30 January, Bartuğ Elmaz was loaned to Sivasspor until the end of the season.

On 31 January, Miguel Crespo was loaned to Spanish side Rayo Vallecano with an option to buy until the end of the season.

=== February ===
On 1 February, Emre Mor moved to Fatih Karagümrük on loan until the end of the season.

On 3 February, Fenerbahçe defeated Antalyaspor 2–0 away with goals from Cengiz Ünder and Michy Batshuayi.

On 7 February, Tiago Çukur moved to Ümraniyespor on loan until the end of the season.

On 7 February, Fenerbahçe beat Gaziantep 2–0 away with goals from Michy Batshuayi and progress to the quarter-finals of the Turkish Cup.

On 8 February, Lincoln was loaned to Brazilian side Red Bull Bragantino with an option to buy until the end of the season.

On 9 February, Serdar Dursun arrived at the club on loan from Fatih Karagümrük until the end of the season.

On 11 February, Fenerbahçe drew 2–2 at home against Alanyaspor. The team scored in the second half through Dušan Tadić's penalty and Edin Džeko.

On 17 February, Fenerbahçe defeated Çaykur Rizespor 3–1 away with goals from Serdar Dursun, Edin Džeko and İrfan Kahveci. The match was marked by heavy rain and poor pitch conditions.

On 24 February, Kartal's team managed to beat Kasımpaşa 2–1 at home, as Mert Hakan Yandaş and Michy Batshuayi got on the scoresheet.

On 27 February, Fenerbahçe lost 3–0 away to Ankaragücü in the quarter-finals of the Turkish Cup and bid farewell to the competition.

=== March ===
On 2 March, Fenerbahçe defeated Hatayspor 2–0 away with goals from Bright Osayi-Samuel and Cengiz Ünder.

On 7 March, Michy Batshuayi, Jayden Oosterwolde and Dušan Tadić's goals were enough to beat Europa Conference League round of 16 opponents Union Saint-Gilloise 3–0 in the first leg.

On 10 March, Fener's game at the Saracoğlu ended in a 4–1 victory over Pendikspor, as Mert Hakan Yandaş, Michy Batshuayi, Ferdi Kadıoğlu and İrfan Kahveci got on the scoresheet.

On 14 March, Fenerbahçe faced Union Saint-Gilloise at home in the second leg of the Europa Conference League round of 16. Fener suffered a 1–0 loss after 90 minute, but managed to win 3–1 on aggregate to reach the quarter-finals.

On 17 March, Fenerbahçe took on Trabzonspor on the road and managed to get a 3–2 win, thanks to a brace from Fred and a goal from Michy Batshuayi.

=== April ===
On 3 April, Fenerbahçe defeated Adana Demirspor 4–2 at home with goals from Alexander Djiku, Edin Džeko, Dušan Tadić and Serdar Dursun.

On 7 April, Fenerbahçe was to play Galatasaray in Şanlıurfa for the previously postponed 2023 Turkish Super Cup match. However, in line with the club's decision, the match started with the U19 team. The team withdrew from the field after the start of the match and was deemed 3–0 forfeited by the Turkish Football Federation.

On 11 April, Fenerbahçe opened the month with the first leg of the Europa Conference League quarter-finals tie against Olympiacos at away. Despite goals from İrfan Kahveci and Dušan Tadić from penalties, they lost 3–2.

On 14 April, Fenerbahçe beat Fatih Karagümrük 2–1 away, with a goal from Edin Džeko and a late winner by Michy Batshuayi.

On 18 April, Fenerbahçe defeated Olympiacos 1–0 at home with İrfan Kahveci's goal in the quarter-finals second leg of the Europa Conference League, bringing the match to 3–3 on aggregate score and taking the match into extra time. When there was no goal in extra time, the team was defeated 3–2 in a penalty shoot-outs and bid farewell to the tournament.

On 22 April, Fenerbahçe drew 2–2 away to Sivasspor, losing an important point in the championship race. Fred and İrfan Kahveci scored the goals.

On 27 April, Fenerbahçe defeated Beşiktaş 2–1 at home in the derby with goals from Michy Batshuayi and İrfan Kahveci.

=== May ===
On 6 May, Fenerbahçe drew 0–0 away to Konyaspor.

On 12 May, Fenerbahçe defeated Kayserispor 3–0 at home with goals from Michy Batshuayi, Alexander Djiku and Çağlar Söyüncü.

On 19 May, Fenerbahçe defeated Galatasaray 1–0 with Çağlar Söyüncü's goal in the Intercontinental Derby.

On 26 May, Fenerbahçe defeated İstanbulspor 6–0 at home. Edin Džeko, Sebastian Szymański, Dušan Tadić, Bright Osayi-Samuel, Serdar Dursun and Joshua King scored the goals. Although the team reached 99 points, they could not complete the season as champions.

== Players ==
=== First-team squad ===
N	Pos.	Nat.	Name	Age	EU	Since	App	Goals	Ends	Transfer fee	Notes
Goalkeepers
40	GK	(Croatia)	Dominik Livaković	29	EU	2023	40	0	2028	€6.65M	
70	GK	(Turkey)	İrfan Can Eğribayat	25	Non-EU	2022	26	0	2027	€1.20M	
97	GK	(Turkey)	Furkan Onur Akyüz	25	Non-EU	2022	2	0	2025	Youth system	
Defenders
2	DF	(Turkey)	Çağlar Söyüncü	28	Non-EU	2024 (Winter)	16	2	2024	Loan	
4	DF	(Turkey)	Serdar Aziz	33	Non-EU	2019 (Winter)	135	11	2025	Free	
6	DF	(Ghana)	Alexander Djiku	29	EU	2023	36	3	2026	Free	Second nationality: French
14	DF	(Brazil)	Luan Peres	29	Non-EU	2022	23	1	2025	€5.23M	
16	DF	(Turkey)	Mert Müldür	25	EU	2023	31	1	2027	Free	Second nationality: Austrian
19	DF	(Italy)	Leonardo Bonucci	37	EU	2024	13	0	2024	Free	
21	DF	(Nigeria)	Bright Osayi-Samuel	26	Non-EU	2021 (Winter)	139	7	2025	Undisclosed	Second nationality: English
24	DF	(Netherlands)	Jayden Oosterwolde	23	EU	2023 (Winter)	48	2	2027	€6.00M	Other nationalities: Surinamese, Indonesian
29	DF	(Turkey)	Ahmet Aydın	19	Non-EU	2023	1	0	2026	Youth system	
50	DF	(Brazil)	Rodrigo Becão	28	Non-EU	2023	22	1	2028	€8.31M	
95	DF	(Turkey)	Yusuf Akçiçek	18	Non-EU	2023	5	0	2026	Youth system	
Midfielders
5	MF	(Turkey)	İsmail Yüksek	25	Non-EU	2020	80	2	2027	Free	
7	MF	(Turkey)	Ferdi Kadıoğlu	24	EU	2018	199	17	2026	€1.40M	Other nationalities: Dutch, Canadian
8	MF	(Turkey)	Mert Hakan Yandaş (Vice-captain)	29	Non-EU	2020	122	10	2024	Free	
10	MF	(Serbia)	Dušan Tadić (Vice-captain)	35	Non-EU	2023	56	16	2025	Free	
11	MF	(England)	Ryan Kent	27	Non-EU	2023	18	1	2027	Free	
17	MF	(Turkey)	İrfan Kahveci	28	Non-EU	2021 (Winter)	129	29	2025	€7.00M	
26	MF	(Slovenia)	Miha Zajc	29	EU	2019 (Winter)	123	20	2026	€3.50M	
33	MF	(Bosnia and Herzegovina)	Rade Krunić	30	Non-EU	2024	18	0	2024	Loan	
35	MF	(Brazil)	Fred	31	Non-EU	2023	35	3	2027	€9.74M	
53	MF	(Poland)	Sebastian Szymański	25	EU	2023	55	13	2027	€9.75M	
90	MF	(Turkey)	Zeki Dursun	18	Non-EU	2023	2	0	2026	Youth system	
92	MF	(Turkey)	Efekan Karayazı	19	Non-EU	2022	2	0	2026	Youth system	Second nationality: Austrian
Forwards
9	FW	(Bosnia and Herzegovina)	Edin Džeko (Captain)	38	Non-EU	2023	46	25	2025	Free	
15	FW	(Norway)	Joshua King	32	EU	2022	54	12	2024	Free	Second nationality: Gambian
20	FW	(Turkey)	Cengiz Ünder	26	Non-EU	2023	33	9	2027	€15M	
23	FW	(Belgium)	Michy Batshuayi	30	EU	2022	75	44	2025	€3.50M	Second nationality: Congolese
91	FW	(Turkey)	Serdar Dursun	32	EU	2021	74	22	2024	Loan	Second nationality: German

- Last updated: 26 May 2024
- Source: Fenerbahce.org

== Transfers ==
=== In ===
No.	Pos.	Player	Transferred from	Fee	Date	Source
11	MF	(England) Ryan Kent	(Scotland) Rangers	Free transfer	12 June 2023	
70	GK	(Turkey) İrfan Can Eğribayat	(Turkey) Göztepe	€1,200,000	15 June 2023	
9	FW	(Bosnia and Herzegovina) Edin Džeko	(Italy) Inter Milan	Free transfer	22 June 2023	
2	DF	(Brazil) Gustavo Henrique	(Brazil) Flamengo	€1,400,000	30 June 2023	
25	FW	(Turkey) Emre Demir	(Turkey) Samsunspor	Loan return	30 June 2023	
77	FW	(Turkey) Burak Kapacak	(Turkey) Fatih Karagümrük	Loan return	30 June 2023	
—	FW	(Portugal) Bruma	(Portugal) Braga	Loan return	30 June 2023	
—	FW	(Tanzania) Mbwana Samatta	(Belgium) Genk	Loan return	30 June 2023	
—	FW	(Turkey) Tiago Çukur	(Belgium) Dender EH	Loan return	30 June 2023	
—	DF	(Turkey) Çağtay Kurukalıp	(Turkey) Iğdır	Loan return	30 June 2023	—
6	DF	(Ghana) Alexander Djiku	(France) Strasbourg	Free transfer	10 July 2023	
22	FW	(Turkey) Umut Nayir	(Turkey) Eyüpspor	Free transfer	11 July 2023	
53	MF	(Poland) Sebastian Szymański	(Russia) Dynamo Moscow	€9,750,000	12 July 2023	
10	MF	(Serbia) Dušan Tadić	(Netherlands) Ajax	Free transfer	16 July 2023	
50	DF	(Brazil) Rodrigo Becão	(Italy) Udinese	€8,312,500	20 July 2023	
28	MF	(Turkey) Bartuğ Elmaz	(France) Marseille	Free transfer	20 July 2023	
16	DF	(Turkey) Mert Müldür	(Italy) Sassuolo	Undisclosed	2 August 2023	
35	MF	(Brazil) Fred	(England) Manchester United	€9,743,590	13 August 2023	
20	FW	(Turkey) Cengiz Ünder	(France) Marseille	€15,000,000	13 August 2023	
38	DF	(Egypt) Omar Fayed	(Egypt) Al Mokawloon Al Arab	Undisclosed	16 August 2023	
40	GK	(Croatia) Dominik Livaković	(Croatia) Dinamo Zagreb	€6,650,000	25 August 2023	
19	DF	(Italy) Leonardo Bonucci	(Germany) Union Berlin	Free transfer	11 January 2024	
33	MF	(Bosnia and Herzegovina) Rade Krunić	(Italy) AC Milan	Loan	13 January 2024	
2	DF	(Turkey) Çağlar Söyüncü	(Spain) Atlético Madrid	Loan	29 January 2024	
91	FW	(Turkey) Serdar Dursun	(Turkey) Fatih Karagümrük	Loan	9 February 2024	

=== Out ===
No.	Pos.	Player	Transferred to	Fee	Date	Source
13	FW	(Ecuador) Enner Valencia	(Brazil) Internacional	Free transfer	12 June 2023	
—	FW	(Portugal) Bruma	(Portugal) Braga	€6,500,000	14 June 2023	
6	DF	(North Macedonia) Ezgjan Alioski	(Saudi Arabia) Al-Ahli	Loan return	30 June 2023	
2	DF	(Brazil) Gustavo Henrique	(Brazil) Flamengo	Loan return	30 June 2023	
70	GK	(Turkey) İrfan Can Eğribayat	(Turkey) Göztepe	Loan return	30 June 2023	
—	FW	(Germany) Mërgim Berisha	(Germany) FC Augsburg	€4,000,000	30 June 2023	
—	MF	(Greece) Dimitrios Pelkas	(Turkey) İstanbul Başakşehir	End of contract	30 June 2023	
54	GK	(Turkey) Ertuğrul Çetin	(Turkey) Gençlerbirliği	Loan	3 July 2023	
10	MF	(Turkey) Arda Güler	(Spain) Real Madrid	€20,000,000 + Add-ons	6 July 2023	
—	FW	(Turkey) Tiago Çukur	(Belgium) Beveren	Loan	7 July 2023	
—	FW	(Tanzania) Mbwana Samatta	(Greece) PAOK	Undisclosed	17 July 2023	
41	DF	(Hungary) Attila Szalai	(Germany) TSG Hoffenheim	€12,300,000	24 July 2023	
16	FW	(Uruguay) Diego Rossi	(United States) Columbus Crew	$5,630,000	2 August 2023	
20	FW	(Italy) João Pedro	(Brazil) Grêmio	Loan	2 August 2023	
—	DF	(Turkey) Çağtay Kurukalıp	(Turkey) İskenderunspor	Loan	11 August 2023	
5	MF	(Brazil) Willian Arão	(Greece) Panathinaikos	€2,500,000	17 August 2023	
2	DF	(Brazil) Gustavo Henrique	(Spain) Real Valladolid	€1,200,000	22 August 2023	
19	FW	(Turkey) Serdar Dursun	(Turkey) Fatih Karagümrük	Undisclosed	25 August 2023	
1	GK	(Turkey) Altay Bayındır	(England) Manchester United	€5,000,000	1 September 2023	
30	DF	(Turkey) Nazım Sangaré	(Turkey) Fatih Karagümrük	Mutual agreement	14 September 2023	
77	MF	(Turkey) Burak Kapacak	(Turkey) Sivasspor	Loan	15 September 2023	
38	DF	(Egypt) Omar Fayed	(Serbia) Novi Pazar	Loan	15 September 2023	
—	MF	(South Korea) Jo Jin-ho	(Serbia) Novi Pazar	Loan	15 September 2023	
25	MF	(Turkey) Emre Demir	(Turkey) Ümraniyespor	Loan	15 September 2023	
3	DF	(Turkey) Samet Akaydin	(Greece) Panathinaikos	Loan	14 January 2024	
22	FW	(Turkey) Umut Nayir	(Turkey) Pendikspor	Loan	15 January 2024	
28	MF	(Turkey) Bartuğ Elmaz	(Turkey) Sivasspor	Loan	30 January 2024	
27	MF	(Portugal) Miguel Crespo	(Spain) Rayo Vallecano	Loan	31 January 2024	
99	FW	(Turkey) Emre Mor	(Turkey) Fatih Karagümrük	Loan	1 February 2024	
—	FW	(Turkey) Tiago Çukur	(Turkey) Ümraniyespor	Loan	7 February 2024	
18	MF	(Brazil) Lincoln	(Brazil) Red Bull Bragantino	Loan	8 February 2024	

=== Transfer summary ===
Undisclosed fees are not included in the transfer totals.

Expenditure

Summer: ▼€52,056,090

Winter: €0,000,000

Total: ▼€52,056,090

Income

Summer: ▲€51,500,000 + $5,630,000

Winter: €0,000,000

Total: ▲€51,500,000 + $5,630,000

Net totals

Summer: ▼€556,090 + ▲$5,630,000

Winter: €0,000,000

Total: ▼€556,090 + ▲$5,630,000

=== Contract renewals ===
No.	Pos.	Nat.	Player	Age	Status	Contract length	Contract ends	Source
26	MF	(Slovenia)	Miha Zajc	29	Extended	Three-year	30 June 2026	
27	MF	(Portugal)	Miguel Crespo	27	Extended	One-year	30 June 2025	

== Pre-season and friendlies ==
Win Draw Loss Fixtures

=== Pre-season ===
9 July 2023 Pari Premier Cup	Zenit Saint Petersburg (Russia)	0–0 (4–3 p)	(Turkey) Fenerbahçe	Saint Petersburg, Russia
19:30 MSK (UTC+3)	Renan (yellow card) 36'	Report		Stadium: Krestovsky Stadium; Attendance: 35,421; Referee: Sergey Ivanov (RUS)
	Penalties
	Malcom (penalty scored); Adamov (penalty scored); Mostovoy (penalty scored); Sutormin (penalty scored); Bakayev (penalty missed)		(penalty scored) Yüksek; (penalty scored) Osayi-Samuel; (penalty scored) João Pedro; (penalty missed) Rossi; (penalty missed) Kahveci

12 July 2023 Pari Premier Cup	Fenerbahçe (Turkey)	1–3	(Serbia) Red Star Belgrade	Saint Petersburg, Russia
19:30 MSK (UTC+3)	Aziz (yellow card) 51'; Crespo (yellow card) 54'; Yüksek (yellow card) 55'; Yandaş (yellow card) 71'; Osayi-Samuel (yellow card) 72'; João Pedro 79'; Oosterwolde (yellow card) 90+2'	Report	Olayinka 1'; Ivanić 39'; Krasso (yellow card) 42'; Mijailović (yellow card) 56'; Bukari (yellow card) 59'; Lučić 82'; Rodić (yellow card) 85'; Addo (yellow card) 90+5'	Stadium: Smena Stadium; Attendance: 3,075; Referee: Evgeni Kukulyak (RUS)

15 July 2023 Pari Premier Cup	Neftçi (Azerbaijan)	0–1	(Turkey) Fenerbahçe	Saint Petersburg, Russia
14:00 MSK (UTC+3)	Eddy (yellow card) 54'	Report	Arão (yellow card) 59'; Džeko 72'; Kocatürk (yellow card) 90+1'	Stadium: Smena Stadium; Attendance: 2,000; Referee: Pavel Shadykhanov (RUS)

20 July 2023 Friendly	Fenerbahçe (Turkey)	5–0	(Turkey) Gençlerbirliği	Istanbul, Turkey
19:00 TRT (UTC+3)	Džeko; João Pedro; Szymański; Batshuayi	Report		Stadium: Can Bartu Facilities; Referee: Çağdaş Altay

== Competitions ==
=== Overall record ===
Competition	First match	Last match	Starting round	Final position	Record							
Competition	First match	Last match	Starting round	Final position	Pld	W	D	L	GF	GA	GD	Win %
Süper Lig	13 August 2023	26 May 2024	Matchday 1	2nd	38	31	6	1	99	31	+68	81.58
Turkish Cup	17 January 2024	27 February 2024	Fifth round	Quarter-finals	3	2	0	1	8	3	+5	66.67
Turkish Super Cup	7 April 2024		Final	Runners-up	1	0	0	1	0	3	−3	0.00
UEFA Europa Conference League	26 July 2023	18 April 2024	Second qualifying round	Quarter-finals	16	12	0	4	40	17	+23	75.00
Total					58	45	6	7	147	54	+93	77.59

Source: Competitions

=== Süper Lig ===
==== League table ====
Pos	Team	Pld	W	D	L	GF	GA	GD	Pts	Qualification or relegation
1	Galatasaray (C)	38	33	3	2	92	26	+66	102	Qualification for the Champions League play-off round
2	Fenerbahçe	38	31	6	1	99	31	+68	99	Qualification for the Champions League second qualifying round
3	Trabzonspor	38	21	4	13	69	50	+19	67	Qualification for the Europa League second qualifying round
4	Başakşehir	38	18	7	13	57	43	+14	61	Qualification for the Conference League second qualifying round
5	Kasımpaşa	38	16	8	14	62	65	−3	56 (Note: Kasımpaşa are ahead of Beşiktaş on head-to-head points: Kasımpaşa 2–1 Beşiktaş, Beşiktaş 1–3 Kasımpaşa.)	

Source: Süper Lig
Rules for classification: 1) Points; 2) Head-to-head points; 3) Head-to-head goal difference; 4) Head-to-head goals scored; 5) Goal difference; 6) Goals scored; 7) Play-off.
(C) Champions

==== Results summary ====
Overall								Home						Away					
Pld	W	D	L	GF	GA	GD	Pts	W	D	L	GF	GA	GD	W	D	L	GF	GA	GD
38	31	6	1	99	31	+68	99	15	3	1	59	20	+39	16	3	0	40	11	+29

Source: TFF.org

Pld = Matches played; W = Matches won; D = Matches drawn; L = Matches lost; GF = Goals for; GA = Goals against; GD = Goal difference; Pts = Points

==== Results by round ====
Round	1	2	4	5	6	3	7	8	9	10	11	12	13	14	15	17	18	19	16	20	21	22	23	24	25	26	27	28	29	30	31	32	33	34	35	36	37	38
Ground	H	A	A	H	A	H	H	A	H	A	H	A	H	H	A	A	H	A	H	A	H	A	H	A	H	A	H	A	H	A	H	A	A	H	A	H	A	H
Result	W	W	W	W	W	W	W	W	W	W	L	D	W	W	W	W	D	W	W	W	D	W	W	W	D	W	W	W	W	W	W	W	D	W	D	W	W	W
Position	4	1	1	1	1	1	1	1	1	1	2	1	1	1	1	1	1	1	1	1	1	1	1	1	2	2	2	2	2	2	2	2	2	2	2	2	2	2

Source: TFF.org
A = Away; H = Home; W = Win; D = Draw; L = Loss

==== Score overview ====
Win Draw Loss

Opposition	Home score	Away score	Aggregate score	Double
Adana Demirspor	4–2	0–0	4–2	No
Alanyaspor	2–2	1–0	3–2	No
Ankaragücü	2–1	1–0	3–1	Yes
Antalyaspor	3–2	2–0	5–2	Yes
Beşiktaş	2–1	3–1	5–2	Yes
Çaykur Rizespor	5–0	3–1	8–1	Yes
Fatih Karagümrük	2–1	2–1	4–2	Yes
Galatasaray	0–0	1–0	1–0	No
Gaziantep	2–1	1–0	3–1	Yes
Hatayspor	4–2	2–0	6–2	Yes
İstanbul Başakşehir	4–0	1–0	5–0	Yes
İstanbulspor	6–0	5–1	11–1	Yes
Kasımpaşa	2–1	2–0	4–1	Yes
Kayserispor	3–0	4–3	7–3	Yes
Konyaspor	7–1	0–0	7–1	No
Pendikspor	4–1	5–0	9–1	Yes
Samsunspor	1–1	2–0	3–1	No
Sivasspor	4–1	2–2	6–3	No
Trabzonspor	2–3	3–2	5–5	No

==== Matches ====
The league fixtures were announced on 18 July 2023.

13 August 2023 1	Fenerbahçe	2–1	Gaziantep	Istanbul
21:45 TRT (UTC+3)	Džeko 3', 18'; Tadić (penalty missed) 54'	Report	Maxim (yellow card) 20' (yellow-red card) 23'; Marković (yellow card) 20'; Gradel (yellow card) 42'; Kızıldağ 45+5'; Soyalp (yellow card) 59'; Eskihellaç (yellow card) 77'	Stadium: Şükrü Saracoğlu Stadium; Attendance: 38,753; Referee: Abdulkadir Bitigen

21 August 2023 2	Samsunspor	0–2	Fenerbahçe	Samsun
21:00 TRT (UTC+3)	Van Drongelen (yellow card) 90+7'	Report	Džeko 62'; Müldür (yellow card) 90+7'; Szymański 90+8'	Stadium: Samsun Stadium; Attendance: 29,781; Referee: Volkan Bayarslan

3 September 2023 4	Ankaragücü	0–1	Fenerbahçe	Ankara
21:45 TRT (UTC+3)	Çetin (yellow card) 7'; Radaković (yellow card) 73'	Report	Osayi-Samuel 60'; Yüksek (yellow card) 78' (yellow-red card) 84'; Fred (yellow card) 90+3'	Stadium: Eryaman Stadium; Attendance: 16,662; Referee: Arda Kardeşler

17 September 2023 5	Fenerbahçe	3–2	Antalyaspor	Istanbul
17:00 TRT (UTC+3)	Becão (yellow card) 28'; Džeko 45+1'; Kahveci 56'; Osayi-Samuel (yellow card) 72'; Szymański 80'; Crespo (yellow card) 85'	Report	Toprak (yellow card) 29'; Buksa 31', 64', (yellow card) 55'; Yeşilyurt (yellow card) 45'; Yehezkel (yellow card) 88'	Stadium: Şükrü Saracoğlu Stadium; Attendance: 41,119; Referee: Halil Umut Meler

24 September 2023 6	Alanyaspor	0–1	Fenerbahçe	Alanya
20:00 TRT (UTC+3)	Richard (yellow card) 40'; Anderson (yellow card) 90+8'	Report	Džeko (yellow card) 21'; Kahveci (yellow card) 34', (goal) 43'; Kadıoğlu (yellow card) 66'; Tadić (yellow card) 75'; Batshuayi (yellow card) 85'; Djiku (yellow card) 88'	Stadium: Alanya Oba Stadium; Attendance: 7,761; Referee: Atilla Karaoğlan

28 September 2023 3	Fenerbahçe	4–0	İstanbul Başakşehir	Istanbul
20:00 TRT (UTC+3)	Djiku 5', (yellow card) 67'; Duarte 10' (o.g.); Szymański 20', 80', (yellow card) 71'; Kahveci (yellow card) 39'; Oosterwolde (yellow card) 76'	Report	Figueiredo (yellow card) 53'	Stadium: Şükrü Saracoğlu Stadium; Attendance: 38,216; Referee: Zorbay Küçük
Note: Turkish Football Federation announced that the league matches they will play at the weekend were postponed to a later date so that Turkish clubs playing in the UEFA Champions League and UEFA Europa Conference League would not be adversely affected by the busy match schedule. It has been announced that the postponed match will be played on 28 September.

1 October 2023 7	Fenerbahçe	5–0	Çaykur Rizespor	Istanbul
16:00 TRT (UTC+3)	Szymański 3'; Kahveci 47'; Džeko 62'; Tadić 75'; King 90+3', (yellow card) 90+3'	Report	Şahin (yellow card) 45+3'; Shelvey (yellow card) 80'; Gaich (yellow card) 90+2'	Stadium: Şükrü Saracoğlu Stadium; Attendance: 40,481; Referee: Cihan Aydın

8 October 2023 8	Kasımpaşa	0–2	Fenerbahçe	Istanbul
19:00 TRT (UTC+3)	Ngoy (yellow card) 55'; Omeruo (yellow card) 87'; Çiftpınar (yellow card) 89'	Report	Džeko 6'; Tadić 45+3' (pen.)	Stadium: Recep Tayyip Erdoğan Stadium; Attendance: 7,410; Referee: Mete Kalkavan

22 October 2023 9	Fenerbahçe	4–2	Hatayspor	Istanbul
19:00 TRT (UTC+3)	Szymański 7'; Osayi-Samuel 15'; Džeko 39'; Kahveci 63'; Becão (yellow card) 73'	Report	Dele-Bashiru (yellow card) 20'; Ghoulam 55'; Kilama (yellow card) 61'; Bekaroğlu (yellow card) 69'; Lamkel Zé (yellow card) 73'; Aabid 90+4'	Stadium: Şükrü Saracoğlu Stadium; Attendance: 41,976; Referee: Volkan Bayarslan

29 October 2023 10	Pendikspor	0–5	Fenerbahçe	Istanbul
19:00 TRT (UTC+3)	Akdağ (yellow card) 23'	Report	Osayi-Samuel (yellow card) 23'; Canpolat 30' (o.g.); Kahveci 42'; Džeko 65', 77', 87'; Yüksek (yellow card) 73'	Stadium: Pendik Stadium; Attendance: 1,343; Referee: Abdulkadir Bitigen

4 November 2023 11	Fenerbahçe	2–3	Trabzonspor	Istanbul
19:00 TRT (UTC+3)	Akaydin (yellow card) 32'; Eğribayat (yellow card) 45+3'; Tadić 61' (pen.), 90' (pen.); Yüksek (yellow card) 68' (yellow-red card) 78'; Kadıoğlu (yellow card) 81'; Osayi-Samuel (yellow card) 90+2'	Report	Onuachu 10'; Özdemir 46'; Pépé 47'; Elmalı (yellow card) 52'; Višća (yellow card) 78'; Bakasetas (yellow card) 81'; Çakır (yellow card) 90+8'	Stadium: Şükrü Saracoğlu Stadium; Attendance: 44,821; Referee: Zorbay Küçük

12 November 2023 12	Adana Demirspor	0–0	Fenerbahçe	Adana
19:00 TRT (UTC+3)	Belhanda (yellow card) 74'; Balotelli (yellow card) 90+2'; Rodrigues (yellow card) 90+3'	Report	Crespo (yellow card) 23'; Osayi-Samuel (yellow card) 58'; Oosterwolde (yellow card) 74'	Stadium: New Adana Stadium; Attendance: 27,702; Referee: Halil Umut Meler

26 November 2023 13	Fenerbahçe	2–1	Fatih Karagümrük	Istanbul
19:00 TRT (UTC+3)	Crespo (yellow card) 45+2'; Tadić 48' (pen.), 58', (yellow card) 87'; Szymański (yellow card) 68'; Ünder (yellow card) 90+1'; Akaydin (yellow card) 90+6'	Report	Ceccherini (yellow card) 34'; Keleş 39'; Dituro (yellow card) 47'; Mercan (yellow card) 56'; Drešević (yellow card) 81'	Stadium: Şükrü Saracoğlu Stadium; Attendance: 38,124; Referee: Arda Kardeşler

4 December 2023 14	Fenerbahçe	4–1	Sivasspor	Istanbul
20:00 TRT (UTC+3)	Akaydin (yellow card) 14'; Szymański 17'; Kahveci 42'; Okumuş 68' (o.g.); Džeko 75'	Report	Manaj 50'; Charisis (yellow card) 56'	Stadium: Şükrü Saracoğlu Stadium; Attendance: 31,561; Referee: Bahattin Şimşek

9 December 2023 15	Beşiktaş	1–3	Fenerbahçe	Istanbul
19:00 TRT (UTC+3)	Rebić (yellow card) 23'; Oxlade-Chamberlain 24' (pen.); Uçan (yellow card) 52'; Günok (yellow card) 75'; Bingöl (yellow card) 78'; Uysal (yellow card) 90+7'	Report	Džeko 10', (yellow card) 21'; Akaydin (yellow card) 21'; Fred (yellow card) 23'; Tadić 63' (pen.), (penalty missed) 90+2'; Kahveci (yellow card) 82'; Szymański 90+6'	Stadium: Beşiktaş Stadium; Attendance: 37,703; Referee: Atilla Karaoğlan

20 December 2023 17	Kayserispor	3–4	Fenerbahçe	Kayseri
17:00 TRT (UTC+3)	Karimi (yellow card) 36'; Kemen 45+4'; Thiam 56' (pen.); Cardoso 73'; Hosseini (yellow card) 90+4'	Report	Ünder 8'; Batshuayi 40', 50', 79' (pen.); Djiku (yellow card) 57'; Oosterwolde (yellow card) 87'; Yandaş (yellow card) 90+7' (yellow-red card) 90+11'; Fred (red card) 90+8'	Stadium: Kadir Has Stadium; Attendance: 13,049; Referee: Zorbay Küçük

24 December 2023 18	Fenerbahçe	0–0	Galatasaray	Istanbul
19:00 TRT (UTC+3)	Osayi-Samuel (yellow card) 12'; Kahveci (yellow card) 57'; King (yellow card) 72'	Report	Torreira (yellow card) 64'; Boey (yellow card) 73'; Ziyech (yellow card) 85'; Aktürkoğlu (yellow card) 90+1'	Stadium: Şükrü Saracoğlu Stadium; Attendance: 45,401; Referee: Arda Kardeşler

7 January 2024 19	İstanbulspor	1–5	Fenerbahçe	Istanbul
16:00 TRT (UTC+3)	Sarıkaya (yellow card) 9', (goal) 32'; Arda (yellow card) 63'; Coly (yellow card) 90+1'	Report	Ünder 6', 34', 44', 46'; Džeko 45+1'; Tadić (penalty missed) 65'; Elmaz (yellow card) 90+7'	Stadium: Atatürk Olympic Stadium; Attendance: 21,038; Referee: Volkan Bayarslan

10 January 2024 16	Fenerbahçe	7–1	Konyaspor	Istanbul
20:00 TRT (UTC+3)	Džeko 11' (pen.), 32', 40'; Müldür 42'; Szymański 44'; Batshuayi 63'; Aziz (yellow card) 71'; Yazğılı 83' (o.g.)	Report	Oğuz (yellow card) 45'; Demirbağ (yellow card) 71'; Guilherme 90'	Stadium: Şükrü Saracoğlu Stadium; Attendance: 29,597; Referee: Kadir Sağlam
Note: It was announced that the match, which was planned to be played on 17 December by the Turkish Football Federation, was postponed to a later date after the attack on referee Halil Umut Meler on 11 December.

14 January 2024 20	Gaziantep	0–1	Fenerbahçe	Gaziantep
19:00 TRT (UTC+3)	Kızıldağ (yellow card) 35'; Marković (yellow card) 45+4'; Riascos (yellow card) 90+6'	Report	Džeko (penalty missed) 50'; Batshuayi (yellow card) 65'; Kahveci 81', (yellow card) 90+6'	Stadium: Gaziantep Stadium; Attendance: 23,889; Referee: Tugay Kaan Numanoğlu

21 January 2024 21	Fenerbahçe	1–1	Samsunspor	Istanbul
16:00 TRT (UTC+3)	Kahveci 12'; Müldür (yellow card) 52'	Report	Mouandilmadji (yellow card) 20'; Kılınç 62'; Kocuk (yellow card) 84'; Holse (yellow card) 90+5'	Stadium: Şükrü Saracoğlu Stadium; Attendance: 39,515; Referee: Bahattin Şimşek

24 January 2024 22	İstanbul Başakşehir	0–1	Fenerbahçe	Istanbul
20:00 TRT (UTC+3)	Ba (yellow card) 25'; Figueiredo (yellow card) 45' (yellow-red card) 45+2'; Ergün (yellow card) 77'; Dubois (yellow card) 77'; Lima (yellow card) 84'; Kény (yellow card) 90+1' (yellow-red card) 90+3'; Türüç (yellow card) 90+2'	Report	Yüksek (yellow card) 12'; Oosterwolde (yellow card) 20'; Batshuayi (yellow card) 77', (goal) 90+4' (pen.); Mor (yellow card) 90+6'	Stadium: Başakşehir Fatih Terim Stadium; Attendance: 7,100; Referee: Abdulkadir Bitigen

28 January 2024 23	Fenerbahçe	2–1	Ankaragücü	Istanbul
19:00 TRT (UTC+3)	Ünder 20', 32'	Report	Ciğerci 13' (pen.)	Stadium: Şükrü Saracoğlu Stadium; Attendance: 40,214; Referee: Cihan Aydın

3 February 2024 24	Antalyaspor	0–2	Fenerbahçe	Antalya
19:00 TRT (UTC+3)	Kałuziński (yellow card) 90+2'	Report	Ünder 42'; Batshuayi 90+5'	Stadium: Antalya Stadium; Attendance: 23,153; Referee: Volkan Bayarslan

11 February 2024 25	Fenerbahçe	2–2	Alanyaspor	Istanbul
19:00 TRT (UTC+3)	Szymański (yellow card) 9'; Tadić (yellow card) 42', (goal) 49' (pen.); Ünder (yellow card) 45+5'; Džeko 59'	Report	Carlos Eduardo (yellow card) 4'; Fer (yellow card) 5'; Augusto 12', 63', (yellow card) 45+5'; Aydın (yellow card) 44'; Richard (yellow card) 85'	Stadium: Şükrü Saracoğlu Stadium; Attendance: 40,725; Referee: Çağdaş Altay

17 February 2024 26	Çaykur Rizespor	1–3	Fenerbahçe	Rize
19:00 TRT (UTC+3)	Sarıkaya (yellow card) 13'; Topçu (yellow card) 19'; Minchev 27'; David (yellow card) 59'; Shelvey (yellow card) 90+6'	Report	Ünder (yellow card) 45+1'; Dursun 48'; Džeko 65'; Kahveci 90+3'; Yandaş (yellow card) 90+7'	Stadium: Rize City Stadium; Attendance: 9,639; Referee: Arda Kardeşler

24 February 2024 27	Fenerbahçe	2–1	Kasımpaşa	Istanbul
19:00 TRT (UTC+3)	Yüksek (yellow card) 14'; Yandaş 64'; Djiku (yellow card) 84'; Batshuayi 90+6'	Report	Ben Ouanes (yellow card) 14'; Porozo 58'; Fall (yellow card) 82'; Thomas (yellow card) 90'	Stadium: Şükrü Saracoğlu Stadium; Attendance: 40,094; Referee: Cihan Aydın

2 March 2024 28	Hatayspor	0–2	Fenerbahçe	Mersin (Note: Turkish Football Federation announced that Hatayspor will play their new seasons matches in Mersin due to the 2023 Turkey–Syria earthquake.)
19:00 TRT (UTC+3)	Massanga (yellow card) 44'	Report	Osayi-Samuel (yellow card) 8', (goal) 24'; Becão (yellow card) 34'; Ünder 40'; Oosterwolde (yellow card) 78'; Yüksek (yellow card) 90+2'; Söyüncü (yellow card) 90+4'	Stadium: Mersin Arena; Attendance: 18,547; Referee: Atilla Karaoğlan

10 March 2024 29	Fenerbahçe	4–1	Pendikspor	Istanbul
19:00 TRT (UTC+3)	Müldür (yellow card) 15'; Oosterwolde (yellow card) 18'; Džeko (yellow card) 26'; Kadıoğlu (yellow card) 45+14', (goal) 90+4'; Yandaş 59'; Batshuayi 87' (pen.); Eğribayat (yellow card) 89'; Osayi-Samuel (yellow card) 90+7'; Kahveci 90+9'	Report	Canpolat (yellow card) 26'; Akbunar 30', (yellow card) 45+2'; Badou (yellow card) 54'; Welinton (yellow card) 61' (yellow-red card) 71'; Lusamba (yellow card) 90+1' (yellow-red card) 90+1'; Sequeira (yellow card) 90+4'	Stadium: Şükrü Saracoğlu Stadium; Attendance: 39,572; Referee: Kadir Sağlam

17 March 2024 30	Trabzonspor	2–3	Fenerbahçe	Trabzon
20:30 TRT (UTC+3)	Destan (yellow card) 52'; Bardhi 63'; Denswil (yellow card) 70'; Elmalı (yellow card) 76'; Trézéguet 78' (pen.), (yellow card) 78'; Bozok (yellow card) 90+13'	Report	Fred 13', 45+4'; Djiku (yellow card) 75'; Osayi-Samuel (yellow card) 82'; Batshuayi 87'; Oosterwolde (yellow card) 90+13'	Stadium: Şenol Güneş Sports Complex; Attendance: 37,580; Referee: Halil Umut Meler

3 April 2024 31	Fenerbahçe	4–2	Adana Demirspor	Istanbul
20:30 TRT (UTC+3)	Djiku 17'; Džeko 51'; Oosterwolde (yellow card) 64'; Tadić 70'; Szymański (yellow card) 72'; Dursun 85'	Report	Balotelli 25'; Barası 80'; Nani (yellow card) 84'	Stadium: Şükrü Saracoğlu Stadium; Attendance: 32,293; Referee: Arda Kardeşler

14 April 2024 32	Fatih Karagümrük	1–2	Fenerbahçe	Istanbul
19:00 TRT (UTC+3)	Eysseric (yellow card) 11' (yellow-red card) 90+7'; Keleş 45+1'; Ceccherini (yellow card) 55'; Marcão (yellow card) 74'; Mendes (red card) 76'; Biraschi (yellow card) 89'	Report	Aziz (yellow card) 26'; Džeko 49'; Osayi-Samuel (yellow card) 55'; Batshuayi 57' (pen.); Zajc (yellow card) 90+2'	Stadium: Atatürk Olympic Stadium; Attendance: 11,656; Referee: Tugay Kaan Numanoğlu

22 April 2024 33	Sivasspor	2–2	Fenerbahçe	Sivas
20:00 TRT (UTC+3)	Koita 57', (yellow card) 88'; Çiftçi (yellow card) 63'; Akdağ (yellow card) 90'; Manaj 90+4', (yellow card) 90+5'	Report	Yüksek (yellow card) 35'; Fred 45+2'; Kahveci 80'	Stadium: New Sivas 4 Eylül Stadium; Attendance: 8,932; Referee: Cihan Aydın

27 April 2024 34	Fenerbahçe	2–1	Beşiktaş	Istanbul
19:00 TRT (UTC+3)	Batshuayi 30'; Kahveci 69'; Osayi-Samuel (yellow card) 77'	Report	Uysal (yellow card) 8'; Al-Musrati (red card) 25'; Ghezzal (yellow card) 56'; Tosun 82'; Colley (yellow card) 90+3'	Stadium: Şükrü Saracoğlu Stadium; Attendance: 38,437; Referee: Volkan Bayarslan

6 May 2024 35	Konyaspor	0–0	Fenerbahçe	Konya
20:00 TRT (UTC+3)	Oğuz (yellow card) 34'; Słowik (yellow card) 66'; Ndao (yellow card) 90+2'; Demir (yellow card) 90+11'	Report		Stadium: Konya Metropolitan Municipality Stadium; Attendance: 23,834; Referee: Bahattin Şimşek

12 May 2024 36	Fenerbahçe	3–0	Kayserispor	Istanbul
19:00 TRT (UTC+3)	Batshuayi 18'; Djiku 43'; Becão (yellow card) 45+3'; Söyüncü 59'	Report	Yılmaz (yellow card) 10'; Shukurov (yellow card) 28'; Sazdağı (yellow card) 51'; Boa Morte (yellow card) 90+1'	Stadium: Şükrü Saracoğlu Stadium; Attendance: 23,853; Referee: Direnç Tonusluoğlu

19 May 2024 37	Galatasaray	0–1	Fenerbahçe	Istanbul
19:00 TRT (UTC+3)	Mertens (yellow card) 5'; Yılmaz (yellow card) 13'; Ziyech (yellow card) 59'; Kutlu (yellow card) 88'	Report	Djiku (yellow card) 12' (yellow-red card) 21'; Osayi-Samuel (yellow card) 13'; Batshuayi (yellow card) 34'; Yandaş (yellow card) 65'; Söyüncü 71'; Livaković (yellow card) 86'; Fred (yellow card) 90+5'	Stadium: Rams Park; Attendance: 53,775; Referee: Arda Kardeşler

26 May 2024 38	Fenerbahçe	6–0	İstanbulspor	Istanbul
19:00 TRT (UTC+3)	Džeko 8' (pen.); Szymański 15'; Tadić 35'; Fred (yellow card) 57'; Osayi-Samuel 66'; Dursun 76'; King 78'; Bonucci (yellow card) 90+3'	Report	Erdoğan (yellow card) 80'	Stadium: Şükrü Saracoğlu Stadium; Attendance: 41,241; Referee: Volkan Bayarslan

=== Turkish Cup ===
17 January 2024 Fifth round	Fenerbahçe	6–0	Adanaspor	Istanbul
21:00 TRT (UTC+3)	Lincoln 28'; Batshuayi 39', 50', 68', 71'; Yandaş 81'	Report	Dabo (yellow card) 67'	Stadium: Şükrü Saracoğlu Stadium; Referee: Çağdaş Altay

7 February 2024 Round of 16	Gaziantep	0–2	Fenerbahçe	Gaziantep
20:45 TRT (UTC+3)	Maxim (penalty missed) 29'; Sorescu (yellow card) 45+1'	Report	Batshuayi 17' (pen.), 31'; Oosterwolde (yellow card) 19'; Yüksek (yellow card) 73'	Stadium: Gaziantep Stadium; Referee: Burak Şeker

27 February 2024 Quarter-finals	Ankaragücü	3–0	Fenerbahçe	Ankara
20:45 TRT (UTC+3)	Moruțan 10', (yellow card) 76'; Chatzigiovanis 33'; Rodrigues 87'; Pedrinho (yellow card) 90+7'	Report	Yüksek (yellow card) 68'; Müldür (yellow card) 80'; Oosterwolde (yellow card) 90+7'	Stadium: Eryaman Stadium; Referee: Bahattin Şimşek

=== Turkish Super Cup ===
7 April 2024 Final	Galatasaray	3–0 (awarded) (Note: The referee cancelled the match after Fenerbahçe withdrew from the pitch during the match. The Turkish Football Federation announced that the match was registered as 3–0 in favour of Galatasaray by forfeit. .)	Fenerbahçe	Şanlıurfa
21:30 TRT (UTC+3)	Icardi 1'	Report		Stadium: Şanlıurfa 11 Nisan Stadium; Referee: Volkan Bayarslan
Note: Saudi authorities refused permission for Fenerbahçe and Galatasaray to use banners and warm up in Mustafa Kemal Atatürk-themed t-shirts during the match opening ceremony in Riyadh. Both sides refused to play, resulting in the postponed of the match. After a while, the Turkish Football Federation announced that the postponed match would be played in Şanlıurfa on 7 April.

=== UEFA Europa Conference League ===
==== Second qualifying round ====
26 July 2023 First leg	Fenerbahçe (Turkey)	5–0	(Moldova) Zimbru Chișinău	Istanbul, Turkey
21:00 TRT (UTC+3)	Kadıoğlu 11'; Kent 13'; Yandaş (yellow card) 21'; Džeko 61'; Szymański 63'; King 88'	Report	Dedechko (yellow card) 15'; Guera Djou (yellow card) 84'; Ieșeanu (yellow card) 90+4'	Stadium: Şükrü Saracoğlu Stadium; Attendance: 26,526; Referee: Nenad Minaković (Serbia)

1 August 2023 Second leg	Zimbru Chișinău (Moldova)	0–4 (0–9 agg.)	(Turkey) Fenerbahçe	Chișinău, Moldova
20:30 EEST (UTC+3)	Guera Djou (yellow card) 70'	Report	Tadić 48'; Batshuayi 57', 59'; Yüksek 77'; Osayi-Samuel (yellow card) 80'; Kapacak (yellow card) 90+2'	Stadium: Zimbru Stadium; Attendance: 7,569; Referee: Rob Harvey (Republic of Ireland)

==== Third qualifying round ====
10 August 2023 First leg	Fenerbahçe (Turkey)	3–1	(Slovenia) Maribor	Istanbul, Turkey
21:00 TRT (UTC+3)	Peres (yellow card) 10'; Becão 58'; Kahveci 62'; Tadić 90+3' (pen.); Osayi-Samuel (yellow card) 90+4'	Report	Repas (yellow card) 35'; Urata (yellow card) 43'; Strajnar 72'	Stadium: Şükrü Saracoğlu Stadium; Attendance: 33,015; Referee: Robert Jones (England)

17 August 2023 Second leg	Maribor (Slovenia)	0–3 (1–6 agg.)	(Turkey) Fenerbahçe	Maribor, Slovenia
20:15 CEST (UTC+2)	Skuka (yellow card) 26'; Jakupović (penalty missed) 32'; Milec (yellow card) 48'; Uskoković (yellow card) 56'	Report	Kahveci 17'; Akaydin (yellow card) 34'; Szymański 77'; Tadić 79'	Stadium: Ljudski vrt Attendance: 10,100; Referee: Fabio Verissimo (Portugal)

==== Play-off round ====
24 August 2023 First leg	Fenerbahçe (Turkey)	5–1	(Netherlands) Twente	Istanbul, Turkey
20:00 TRT (UTC+3)	Oosterwolde 33'; Szymański 60'; Kahveci 63', 74'; Eğribayat (yellow card) 74'; Fred (yellow card) 90+1'; Tadić 90+3' (pen.)	Report	Ugalde 20', (yellow card) 37'; Regeer (red card) 41'	Stadium: Şükrü Saracoğlu Stadium; Attendance: 38,961; Referee: Andrew Madley (England)

31 August 2023 Second leg	Twente (Netherlands)	0–1 (1–6 agg.)	(Turkey) Fenerbahçe	Enschede, Netherlands
19:00 CEST (UTC+2)	Sadílek (yellow card) 26'; Rots (yellow card) 37'; Kjølø (yellow card) 58'	Report	Oosterwolde (yellow card) 9'; Yandaş (yellow card) 24'; Aziz (yellow card) 32'; Becão (yellow card) 45+2'; Yüksek (yellow card) 45+5'; Džeko 72' (pen.)	Stadium: De Grolsch Veste; Attendance: 22,500; Referee: Fabio Maresca (Italy)

==== Group stage ====
Pos	Team	Pld	W	D	L	GF	GA	GD	Pts	Qualification	FEN	LUD	NOR	TRN
1	(Turkey) Fenerbahçe	6	4	0	2	13	11	+2	12 (Note: Tied on head-to-head results. Overall goal difference used as a tiebreaker.)	Advance to round of 16	—	3–1	3–1	4–0
2	(Bulgaria) Ludogorets Razgrad	6	4	0	2	11	11	0	12	Advance to knockout round play-offs	2–0	—	1–0	4–0
3	(Denmark) Nordsjælland	6	3	1	2	17	7	+10	10		6–1	7–1	—	1–1
4	(Slovakia) Spartak Trnava	6	0	1	5	3	15	−12	1		1–2	1–2	0–2	—

Source: UEFA
Rules for classification: Group stage tiebreakers
Notes:

21 September 2023 1	Fenerbahçe (Turkey)	3–1	(Denmark) Nordsjælland	Istanbul, Turkey
19:45 TRT (UTC+3)	Crespo 24'; Batshuayi 30'; Aziz 47'; Fred (yellow card) 66'	Report	Osman (yellow card) 39'; Diomande (yellow card) 43'; Villadsen 55'; Svensson (yellow card) 89'	Stadium: Şükrü Saracoğlu Stadium; Attendance: 36,130; Referee: Gergő Bogár (Hungary)

5 October 2023 2	Spartak Trnava (Slovakia)	1–2	(Turkey) Fenerbahçe	Trnava, Slovakia
21:00 CEST (UTC+2)	Kóša (yellow card) 23'; Bernát (yellow card) 30'; Ofori 88'	Report	Batshuayi (yellow card) 45+1'; King 70', 81'	Stadium: Anton Malatinský Stadium; Attendance: 17,528; Referee: Sascha Stegemann (Germany)

26 October 2023 3	Fenerbahçe (Turkey)	3–1	(Bulgaria) Ludogorets Razgrad	Istanbul, Turkey
19:45 TRT (UTC+3)	Batshuayi 42'; Djiku (yellow card) 50'; Zajc 52', 90+3'; Becão (yellow card) 56'; Crespo (yellow card) 79'	Report	Naressi (yellow card) 43'; Tekpetey (yellow card) 48'; Becão 65' (o.g.); Piotrowski (yellow card) 75'; Delev (yellow card) 90+4'; Nedyalkov (yellow card) 90+4'	Stadium: Şükrü Saracoğlu Stadium; Attendance: 35,595; Referee: Guillermo Cuadra Fernández (Spain)

9 November 2023 4	Ludogorets Razgrad (Bulgaria)	2–0	(Turkey) Fenerbahçe	Razgrad, Bulgaria
21:00 EET (UTC+2)	Piotrowski 18'; Nedyalkov (yellow card) 32'; Gonçalves (yellow card) 39'; Caio Vidal (yellow card) 60'; Russo (yellow card) 71'; Rwan 90+2'	Report	Crespo (yellow card) 38'; Zajc (yellow card) 45+1'; Oosterwolde (yellow card) 49'; Kahveci (yellow card) 77'	Stadium: Huvepharma Arena; Attendance: 10,363; Referee: Ondřej Berka (Czech Republic)

30 November 2023 5	Nordsjælland (Denmark)	6–1	(Turkey) Fenerbahçe	Farum, Denmark
21:00 CET (UTC+1)	Diomande (yellow card) 17'; Hey 21'; Svensson 25'; Nygren 55', 75', 84'; Rasmussen 66'	Report	Batshuayi 43'	Stadium: Right to Dream Park; Attendance: 7,323; Referee: Jérémie Pignard (France)

14 December 2023 6	Fenerbahçe (Turkey)	4–0	(Slovakia) Spartak Trnava	Istanbul, Turkey
20:45 TRT (UTC+3)	Djiku (yellow card) 29'; Kadıoğlu 36'; Takáč 48' (o.g.); Džeko 59', 61'; Oosterwolde (yellow card) 71'	Report	Bukata (yellow card) 31'	Stadium: Şükrü Saracoğlu Stadium; Attendance: 33,936; Referee: Aleksandar Stavrev (North Macedonia)

==== Knockout phase ====
===== Round of 16 =====
The draw for the round of 16 took place on 23 February 2024.

7 March 2024 First leg	Union Saint-Gilloise (Belgium)	0–3	(Turkey) Fenerbahçe	Brussels, Belgium
21:00 CET (UTC+1)	Amoura (yellow card) 45'; Machida (yellow card) 54'; Burgess (yellow card) 90+3'	Report	Batshuayi 20'; Krunić (yellow card) 81'; Oosterwolde 84'; Tadić 90+4' (pen.)	Stadium: Constant Vanden Stock Stadium (Note: Union Saint-Gilloise play their home match at the Constant Vanden Stock Stadium, in Brussels, instead of their regular stadium, Joseph Marien Stadium, in Brussels, which did not meet UEFA requirements.); Attendance: 13,522; Referee: João Pinheiro (Portugal)

14 March 2024 Second leg	Fenerbahçe (Turkey)	0–1 (3–1 agg.)	(Belgium) Union Saint-Gilloise	Istanbul, Turkey
20:45 TRT (UTC+3)	Yüksek (yellow card) 28'; Eğribayat (yellow card) 87'	Report	Rasmussen 68'; Eckert (yellow card) 87'	Stadium: Şükrü Saracoğlu Stadium; Attendance: 35,605; Referee: Nikola Dabanović (Montenegro)

===== Quarter-finals =====
The draw for the quarter-finals took place on 15 March 2024.

11 April 2024 First leg	Olympiacos (Greece)	3–2	(Turkey) Fenerbahçe	Piraeus, Greece
19:45 EEST (UTC+3)	Fortounis 8'; Jovetić 32'; Chiquinho 57'; Retsos (yellow card) 67'; Masouras (yellow card) 78'	Report	Kahveci (yellow card) 22', (goal) 74'; Tadić 68' (pen.); Fred (yellow card) 73'	Stadium: Karaiskakis Stadium; Attendance: 32,000; Referee: Sandro Schärer (Switzerland)

18 April 2024 Second leg	Fenerbahçe (Turkey)	1–0 (a.e.t.) (3–3 agg.) (2–3 p)	(Greece) Olympiacos	Istanbul, Turkey
22:00 TRT (UTC+3)	Kahveci 11'; Szymański (yellow card) 94'	Report	Ortega (yellow card) 36'; Podence (yellow card) 60'; Tzolakis (yellow card) 61'; Ntoi (yellow card) 72' (yellow-red card) 120+3'; Masouras (yellow card) 90+4'; Hezze (yellow card) 112'	Stadium: Şükrü Saracoğlu Stadium; Attendance: 44,040; Referee: Tobias Stieler (Germany)
	Penalties
	Tadić (penalty missed); Batshuayi (penalty scored); Ünder (penalty missed); Djiku (penalty scored); Bonucci (penalty missed)		(penalty scored) El Kaabi; (penalty missed) El-Arabi; (penalty scored) Horta; (penalty scored) Masouras; (penalty missed) Rodinei

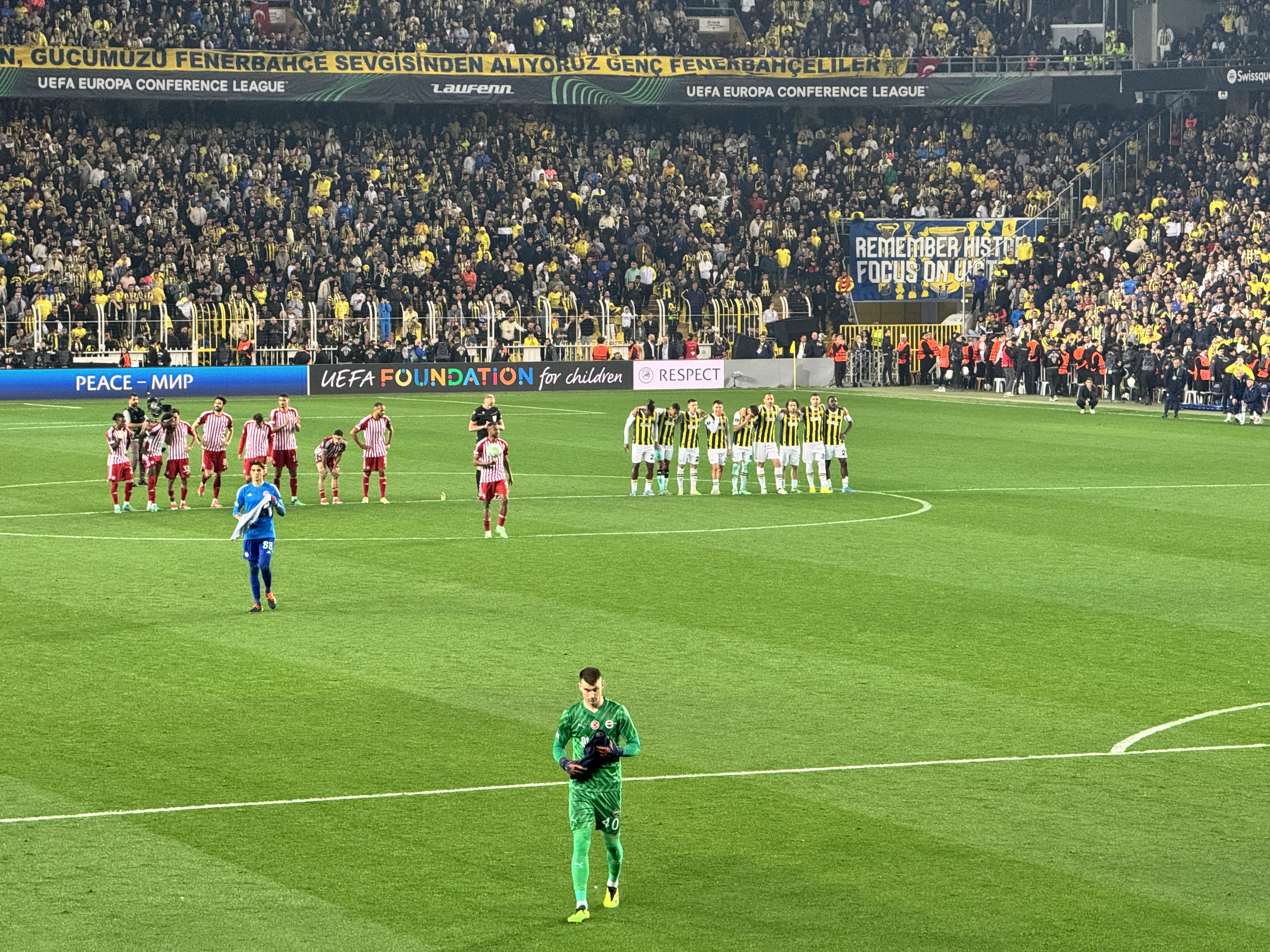
Ayoub El Kaabi is about to score in the Fenerbahçe vs. Olympiacos penalty shootout.

== Statistics ==
=== Appearances and goals ===
No.	Pos	Nat	Player	Total		Süper Lig		Turkish Cup		Turkish Super Cup		Europa Conference League	
No.	Pos	Nat	Player	Apps	Goals	Apps	Goals	Apps	Goals	Apps	Goals	Apps	Goals
Goalkeepers
40	GK	(Croatia) CRO	Dominik Livaković	40	0	34	0	0	0	0	0	6	0
70	GK	(Turkey) TUR	İrfan Can Eğribayat	13	0	3	0	3	0	0	0	7	0
97	GK	(Turkey) TUR	Furkan Onur Akyüz	1	0	1	0	0	0	0	0	0	0
Defenders
2	DF	(Turkey) TUR	Çağlar Söyüncü	16	2	12	2	1	0	0	0	3	0
4	DF	(Turkey) TUR	Serdar Aziz	20	1	12	0	2	0	0	0	6	1
6	DF	(Ghana) GHA	Alexander Djiku	36	2	25	2	0	0	0	0	11	0
14	DF	(Brazil) BRA	Luan Peres	3	0	0	0	0	0	0	0	3	0
16	DF	(Turkey) TUR	Mert Müldür	31	1	26	1	3	0	0	0	2	0
19	DF	(Italy) ITA	Leonardo Bonucci	13	0	8	0	3	0	0	0	2	0
21	DF	(Nigeria) NGA	Bright Osayi-Samuel	39	4	23	4	1	0	0	0	15	0
24	DF	(Netherlands) NED	Jayden Oosterwolde	43	2	27	0	3	0	0	0	13	2
29	DF	(Turkey) TUR	Ahmet Aydın	1	0	0	0	1	0	0	0	0	0
50	DF	(Brazil) BRA	Rodrigo Becão	22	1	16	0	0	0	0	0	6	1
95	DF	(Turkey) TUR	Yusuf Akçiçek	4	0	1	0	0	0	0	0	3	0
Midfielders
5	MF	(Turkey) TUR	İsmail Yüksek	47	1	30	0	3	0	0	0	14	1
7	MF	(Turkey) TUR	Ferdi Kadıoğlu	51	3	37	1	2	0	0	0	12	2
8	MF	(Turkey) TUR	Mert Hakan Yandaş	27	3	16	2	3	1	0	0	8	0
10	MF	(Serbia) SRB	Dušan Tadić	56	16	38	10	2	0	0	0	16	6
11	MF	(England) ENG	Ryan Kent	18	1	8	0	0	0	0	0	10	1
17	MF	(Turkey) TUR	İrfan Kahveci	46	18	31	12	1	0	0	0	14	6
26	MF	(Slovenia) SVN	Miha Zajc	21	2	11	0	2	0	0	0	8	2
33	MF	(Bosnia and Herzegovina) BIH	Rade Krunić	18	0	12	0	3	0	0	0	3	0
35	MF	(Brazil) BRA	Fred	35	3	25	3	0	0	0	0	10	0
53	MF	(Poland) POL	Sebastian Szymański	55	13	37	10	2	0	0	0	16	3
92	MF	(Turkey) TUR	Efekan Karayazı	1	0	0	0	1	0	0	0	0	0
90	MF	(Turkey) TUR	Zeki Dursun	1	0	0	0	0	0	0	0	1	0
Forwards
9	FW	(Bosnia and Herzegovina) BIH	Edin Džeko	46	25	36	21	0	0	0	0	10	4
15	FW	(Norway) NOR	Joshua King	27	5	16	2	2	0	0	0	9	3
20	FW	(Turkey) TUR	Cengiz Ünder	33	9	24	9	2	0	0	0	7	0
23	FW	(Belgium) BEL	Michy Batshuayi	43	24	27	12	3	6	0	0	13	6
91	FW	(Turkey) TUR	Serdar Dursun	11	3	9	3	1	0	0	0	1	0
Players transferred/loaned out during the season
1	GK	(Turkey) TUR	Altay Bayındır	4	0	1	0	0	0	0	0	3	0
2	DF	(Brazil) BRA	Gustavo Henrique	0	0	0	0	0	0	0	0	0	0
3	DF	(Turkey) TUR	Samet Akaydin	11	0	10	0	0	0	0	0	1	0
5	MF	(Brazil) BRA	Willian Arão	0	0	0	0	0	0	0	0	0	0
16	FW	(Uruguay) URU	Diego Rossi	0	0	0	0	0	0	0	0	0	0
18	MF	(Brazil) BRA	Lincoln	1	1	0	0	1	1	0	0	0	0
20	FW	(Italy) ITA	João Pedro	0	0	0	0	0	0	0	0	0	0
22	FW	(Turkey) TUR	Umut Nayir	13	0	6	0	0	0	0	0	7	0
25	MF	(Turkey) TUR	Emre Demir	0	0	0	0	0	0	0	0	0	0
27	MF	(Portugal) POR	Miguel Crespo	17	1	9	0	0	0	0	0	8	1
28	MF	(Turkey) TUR	Bartuğ Elmaz	8	0	5	0	1	0	0	0	2	0
30	DF	(Turkey) TUR	Nazım Sangaré	0	0	0	0	0	0	0	0	0	0
38	DF	(Egypt) EGY	Omar Fayed	0	0	0	0	0	0	0	0	0	0
77	MF	(Turkey) TUR	Burak Kapacak	1	0	0	0	0	0	0	0	1	0
99	FW	(Turkey) TUR	Emre Mor	8	0	6	0	1	0	0	0	1	0

=== Goalscorers ===
Rank	No.	Pos	Nat	Player	Süper Lig	Turkish Cup	Turkish Super Cup	Europa Conference League	Total
1	9	FW	(Bosnia and Herzegovina)	Edin Džeko	21	0	0	4	25
2	23	FW	(Belgium)	Michy Batshuayi	12	6	0	6	24
3	17	MF	(Turkey)	İrfan Kahveci	12	0	0	6	18
4	10	MF	(Serbia)	Dušan Tadić	10	0	0	6	16
5	53	MF	(Poland)	Sebastian Szymański	10	0	0	3	13
6	20	FW	(Turkey)	Cengiz Ünder	9	0	0	0	9
7	15	FW	(Norway)	Joshua King	2	0	0	3	5
8	21	DF	(Nigeria)	Bright Osayi-Samuel	4	0	0	0	4
9	6	DF	(Ghana)	Alexander Djiku	3	0	0	0	3
9	7	MF	(Turkey)	Ferdi Kadıoğlu	1	0	0	2	3
9	8	MF	(Turkey)	Mert Hakan Yandaş	2	1	0	0	3
9	35	MF	(Brazil)	Fred	3	0	0	0	3
9	91	FW	(Turkey)	Serdar Dursun	3	0	0	0	3
14	2	DF	(Turkey)	Çağlar Söyüncü	2	0	0	0	2
14	24	DF	(Netherlands)	Jayden Oosterwolde	0	0	0	2	2
14	26	MF	(Slovenia)	Miha Zajc	0	0	0	2	2
17	4	DF	(Turkey)	Serdar Aziz	0	0	0	1	1
17	5	MF	(Turkey)	İsmail Yüksek	0	0	0	1	1
17	11	MF	(England)	Ryan Kent	0	0	0	1	1
17	16	DF	(Turkey)	Mert Müldür	1	0	0	0	1
17	18	MF	(Brazil)	Lincoln	0	1	0	0	1
17	27	MF	(Portugal)	Miguel Crespo	0	0	0	1	1
17	50	DF	(Brazil)	Rodrigo Becão	0	0	0	1	1
Own goals					4	0	0	1	5
Totals					99	8	0	40	147

=== Hat-tricks ===
Player	Against	Result	Date	Competition	Ref
(Bosnia and Herzegovina) Edin Džeko	Pendikspor	5–0 (A)	29 October 2023	Süper Lig	
(Belgium) Michy Batshuayi	Kayserispor	4–3 (A)	20 December 2023	Süper Lig	
(Turkey) Cengiz Ünder^{4}	İstanbulspor	5–1 (A)	7 January 2024	Süper Lig	
(Bosnia and Herzegovina) Edin Džeko	Konyaspor	7–1 (H)	10 January 2024	Süper Lig	
(Belgium) Michy Batshuayi^{4}	Adanaspor	6–0 (H)	17 January 2024	Turkish Cup	

(H) – Home; (A) – Away
^{4} Player scored four goals

=== Assists ===
Rank	No.	Pos	Nat	Player	Süper Lig	Turkish Cup	Turkish Super Cup	Europa Conference League	Total
1	53	MF	(Poland)	Sebastian Szymański	11	0	0	7	18
2	10	MF	(Serbia)	Dušan Tadić	14	0	0	2	16
3	17	MF	(Turkey)	İrfan Kahveci	7	0	0	3	10
4	9	FW	(Bosnia and Herzegovina)	Edin Džeko	3	0	0	4	7
4	35	MF	(Brazil)	Fred	4	0	0	3	7
6	5	MF	(Turkey)	İsmail Yüksek	4	0	0	1	5
6	7	MF	(Turkey)	Ferdi Kadıoğlu	4	0	0	1	5
6	8	MF	(Turkey)	Mert Hakan Yandaş	2	1	0	2	5
9	16	DF	(Turkey)	Mert Müldür	4	0	0	0	4
10	21	DF	(Nigeria)	Bright Osayi-Samuel	1	0	0	2	3
10	23	FW	(Belgium)	Michy Batshuayi	1	0	0	2	3
12	4	DF	(Turkey)	Serdar Aziz	2	0	0	0	2
12	15	FW	(Norway)	Joshua King	1	0	0	1	2
12	20	FW	(Turkey)	Cengiz Ünder	2	0	0	0	2
12	99	FW	(Turkey)	Emre Mor	0	2	0	0	2
12	91	FW	(Turkey)	Serdar Dursun	2	0	0	0	2
17	2	DF	(Turkey)	Çağlar Söyüncü	0	0	0	1	1
17	6	DF	(Ghana)	Alexander Djiku	1	0	0	0	1
17	11	MF	(England)	Ryan Kent	0	0	0	1	1
17	18	MF	(Brazil)	Lincoln	0	1	0	0	1
17	19	DF	(Italy)	Leonardo Bonucci	1	0	0	0	1
17	28	MF	(Turkey)	Bartuğ Elmaz	0	1	0	0	1
Totals					64	5	0	30	99

=== Clean sheets ===
Rank	No.	Pos	Nat	Player	Süper Lig	Turkish Cup	Turkish Super Cup	Europa Conference League	Total
1	40	GK	(Croatia)	Dominik Livaković	15	0	0	2	17
2	70	GK	(Turkey)	İrfan Can Eğribayat	2	2	0	3	7
3	1	GK	(Turkey)	Altay Bayındır	0	0	0	2	2
Totals					17	2	0	7	26

=== Disciplinary record ===
No.	Pos	Nat	Player	Süper Lig			Turkish Cup			Turkish Super Cup			Europa Conference League			Total		
No.	Pos	Nat	Player	Booked	(yellow card) (yellow-red card)	Sent off (straight red)	Booked	(yellow card) (yellow-red card)	Sent off (straight red)	Booked	(yellow card) (yellow-red card)	Sent off (straight red)	Booked	(yellow card) (yellow-red card)	Sent off (straight red)	Booked	(yellow card) (yellow-red card)	Sent off (straight red)
2	DF	(Turkey)	Çağlar Söyüncü	1	0	0	0	0	0	0	0	0	0	0	0	1	0	0
4	DF	(Turkey)	Serdar Aziz	2	0	0	0	0	0	0	0	0	1	0	0	3	0	0
5	MF	(Turkey)	İsmail Yüksek	7	2	0	2	0	0	0	0	0	2	0	0	11	2	0
6	DF	(Ghana)	Alexander Djiku	6	1	0	0	0	0	0	0	0	2	0	0	8	1	0
7	MF	(Turkey)	Ferdi Kadıoğlu	3	0	0	0	0	0	0	0	0	0	0	0	3	0	0
8	MF	(Turkey)	Mert Hakan Yandaş	3	1	0	0	0	0	0	0	0	2	0	0	5	1	0
9	FW	(Bosnia and Herzegovina)	Edin Džeko	3	0	0	0	0	0	0	0	0	0	0	0	3	0	0
10	MF	(Serbia)	Dušan Tadić	3	0	0	0	0	0	0	0	0	0	0	0	3	0	0
11	MF	(England)	Ryan Kent	0	0	0	0	0	0	0	0	0	0	0	0	0	0	0
14	DF	(Brazil)	Luan Peres	0	0	0	0	0	0	0	0	0	1	0	0	1	0	0
15	FW	(Norway)	Joshua King	2	0	0	0	0	0	0	0	0	1	0	0	3	0	0
16	DF	(Turkey)	Mert Müldür	3	0	0	1	0	0	0	0	0	0	0	0	4	0	0
17	MF	(Turkey)	İrfan Kahveci	5	0	0	0	0	0	0	0	0	2	0	0	7	0	0
19	DF	(Italy)	Leonardo Bonucci	1	0	0	0	0	0	0	0	0	0	0	0	1	0	0
20	FW	(Turkey)	Cengiz Ünder	3	0	0	0	0	0	0	0	0	0	0	0	3	0	0
21	DF	(Nigeria)	Bright Osayi-Samuel	11	0	0	0	0	0	0	0	0	2	0	0	13	0	0
23	FW	(Belgium)	Michy Batshuayi	4	0	0	0	0	0	0	0	0	1	0	0	5	0	0
24	DF	(Netherlands)	Jayden Oosterwolde	8	0	0	2	0	0	0	0	0	3	0	0	13	0	0
26	MF	(Slovenia)	Miha Zajc	1	0	0	0	0	0	0	0	0	1	0	0	2	0	0
29	DF	(Turkey)	Ahmet Aydın	0	0	0	0	0	0	0	0	0	0	0	0	0	0	0
33	MF	(Bosnia and Herzegovina)	Rade Krunić	0	0	0	0	0	0	0	0	0	1	0	0	1	0	0
35	MF	(Brazil)	Fred	4	0	1	0	0	0	0	0	0	3	0	0	7	0	1
40	GK	(Croatia)	Dominik Livaković	1	0	0	0	0	0	0	0	0	0	0	0	1	0	0
50	DF	(Brazil)	Rodrigo Becão	4	0	0	0	0	0	0	0	0	2	0	0	6	0	0
53	MF	(Poland)	Sebastian Szymański	4	0	0	0	0	0	0	0	0	1	0	0	5	0	0
70	GK	(Turkey)	İrfan Can Eğribayat	2	0	0	0	0	0	0	0	0	2	0	0	4	0	0
91	FW	(Turkey)	Serdar Dursun	0	0	0	0	0	0	0	0	0	0	0	0	0	0	0
90	MF	(Turkey)	Zeki Dursun	0	0	0	0	0	0	0	0	0	0	0	0	0	0	0
92	MF	(Turkey)	Efekan Karayazı	0	0	0	0	0	0	0	0	0	0	0	0	0	0	0
95	DF	(Turkey)	Yusuf Akçiçek	0	0	0	0	0	0	0	0	0	0	0	0	0	0	0
97	GK	(Turkey)	Furkan Onur Akyüz	0	0	0	0	0	0	0	0	0	0	0	0	0	0	0
