= List of Turkish football transfers winter 2022–23 =

This is a list of Turkish football transfers for the 2022–23 winter transfer window by club. Only transfers of clubs in the Süper Lig are included.

The winter transfer window opened on 1 January 2023, although a few transfers took place prior to that date. The window closed at midnight on 2 February 2023. Players without a club may join one at any time, either during or in between transfer windows.

On 12 February 2023 Gaziantep and Hatayspor withdrew from the league, following the 2023 Turkey–Syria earthquake.

== Süper Lig ==
=== Adana Demirspor ===
In:

No.	Pos.	Nation	Player
45	DF	TUR	Mert Çetin (on loan from (Italy) Verona)

Out:

No.	Pos.	Nation	Player
—	DF	UKR	Yaroslav Rakitskyi (to (Ukraine) Shakhtar Donetsk)
—	FW	COD	Britt Assombalonga (to (England) Watford)
—	FW	RUS	Artem Dzyuba (to (Russia) Lokomotiv Moscow)

=== Alanyaspor ===
In:

No.	Pos.	Nation	Player
—	FW	GRE	Efthymis Koulouris (on loan from (Austria) LASK)

Out:

No.	Pos.	Nation	Player
—	GK	POR	José Marafona (to (Portugal) Paços de Ferreira)
—	MF	MAR	Oussama Targhalline (loan return to (France) Marseille, later sold to (France) Le Havre)
—	FW	SEN	Famara Diédhiou (on loan to (Spain) Granada)

=== Ankaragücü ===
In:

No.	Pos.	Nation	Player
29	FW	CGO	Bevic Moussiti-Oko (from (France) Ajaccio)
—	MF	ANG	Felício Milson (on loan from (Russia) FC Pari NN)

Out:

No.	Pos.	Nation	Player
—	MF	TUR	Tolga Ciğerci (to (Germany) Hertha BSC)
—	FW	ITA	Federico Macheda (on loan to (Cyprus) APOEL)

=== Antalyaspor ===
In:

No.	Pos.	Nation	Player
6	MF	MKD	Erdal Rakip (from (Sweden) Malmö)
70	MF	TUR	Doğukan Sinik (on loan from (England) Hull City)
90	GK	BRA	Helton Leite (from (Portugal) Benfica)
—	DF	UKR	Mark Mampassi (on loan from (Russia) Lokomotiv Moscow)

Out:

No.	Pos.	Nation	Player

=== Beşiktaş ===
In:

No.	Pos.	Nation	Player
6	DF	GAM	Omar Colley (from (Italy) Sampdoria)

Out:

No.	Pos.	Nation	Player
—	DF	ESP	Javi Montero (on loan to (Germany) Hamburger SV)
—	MF	USA	Tyler Boyd (to (United States) LA Galaxy)
—	FW	NED	Wout Weghorst (loan return to (England) Burnley, later loaned to (England) Manchester United)

=== Fatih Karagümrük ===
In:

No.	Pos.	Nation	Player
6	DF	POR	Bruno Rodrigues (on loan from (Portugal) Braga)

Out:

No.	Pos.	Nation	Player
—	DF	SLE	Steven Caulker (to (England) Wigan Athletic)

=== Fenerbahçe ===
In:

No.	Pos.	Nation	Player
3	DF	TUR	Samet Akaydin (from Adana Demirspor)
22	MF	POR	Bruma (from (Netherlands) PSV, previously on loan)
24	DF	NED	Jayden Oosterwolde (from (Italy) Parma)
—	MF	TUR	Emre Demir (from (Spain) Barcelona)

Out:

No.	Pos.	Nation	Player
22	MF	POR	Bruma (on loan to (Portugal) Braga)
—	MF	TUR	Emre Demir (on loan to Samsunspor)
—	MF	TUR	İsak Vural (on loan to (Sweden) Hammarby)
29	DF	URU	Mauricio Lemos (to (Brazil) Atlético Mineiro)

=== Galatasaray ===
In:

No.	Pos.	Nation	Player
17	MF	ITA	Nicolò Zaniolo (from (Italy) Roma)
23	MF	TUR	Kaan Ayhan (on loan from (Italy) Sassuolo)

Out:

No.	Pos.	Nation	Player
—	DF	NED	Patrick van Aanholt (on loan to (Netherlands) PSV)

=== Gaziantep ===
In:

No.	Pos.	Nation	Player

Out:

No.	Pos.	Nation	Player
—	DF	ROU	Alin Toșca (to (Italy) Benevento)

=== Giresunspor ===
In:

No.	Pos.	Nation	Player

Out:

No.	Pos.	Nation	Player

=== Hatayspor ===
In:

No.	Pos.	Nation	Player
71	MF	TUN	Jeremy Dudziak (on loan from (Germany) Greuther Fürth)

Out:

No.	Pos.	Nation	Player

=== İstanbul Başakşehir ===
In:

No.	Pos.	Nation	Player
4	DF	CHN	Wu Shaocong (from (China) Guangzhou)
11	MF	BEL	Adnan Januzaj (on loan from (Spain) Sevilla)
72	MF	ISR	Eden Kartsev (from (Israel) Maccabi Netanya)

Out:

No.	Pos.	Nation	Player
—	MF	BDI	Youssouf Ndayishimiye (to (France) Nice)

=== İstanbulspor ===
In:

No.	Pos.	Nation	Player
70	MF	COD	Jason Lokilo (on loan from (Netherlands) Sparta Rotterdam)

Out:

No.	Pos.	Nation	Player

=== Kasımpaşa ===
In:

No.	Pos.	Nation	Player
2	DF	BRA	Fabiano (on loan from (Portugal) Braga)

Out:

No.	Pos.	Nation	Player
5	DF	NED	Jeffrey Bruma (to (Netherlands) Heerenveen)
—	DF	ITA	Raoul Petretta (to (United States) (Canada) Toronto)
—	MF	KOS	Bersant Celina (loan return to (France) Dijon, later loaned to (England) Stoke City)

=== Kayserispor ===
In:

No.	Pos.	Nation	Player

Out:

No.	Pos.	Nation	Player

=== Konyaspor ===
In:

No.	Pos.	Nation	Player
32	MF	GRE	Andreas Bouchalakis (on loan from (Greece) Olympiacos)
—	FW	COL	Marlos Moreno (on loan from (France) Troyes)

Out:

No.	Pos.	Nation	Player
—	MF	KOS	Zymer Bytyqi (to (Greece) Olympiacos)

=== Sivasspor ===
In:

No.	Pos.	Nation	Player
—	FW	ECU	Jordy Caicedo (on loan from (Mexico) Tigres)

Out:

No.	Pos.	Nation	Player
—	MF	ISR	Dia Saba (to (Israel) Maccabi Haifa)

=== Trabzonspor ===
In:

No.	Pos.	Nation	Player

Out:

No.	Pos.	Nation	Player
—	FW	TUR	Emrehan Gedikli (on loan to Austria Lustenau)
—	FW	CIV	Jean Evrard Kouassi (to (China) Zhejiang)

=== Ümraniyespor ===
In:

No.	Pos.	Nation	Player

Out:

No.	Pos.	Nation	Player
