= 2023 Turkish Cup final =

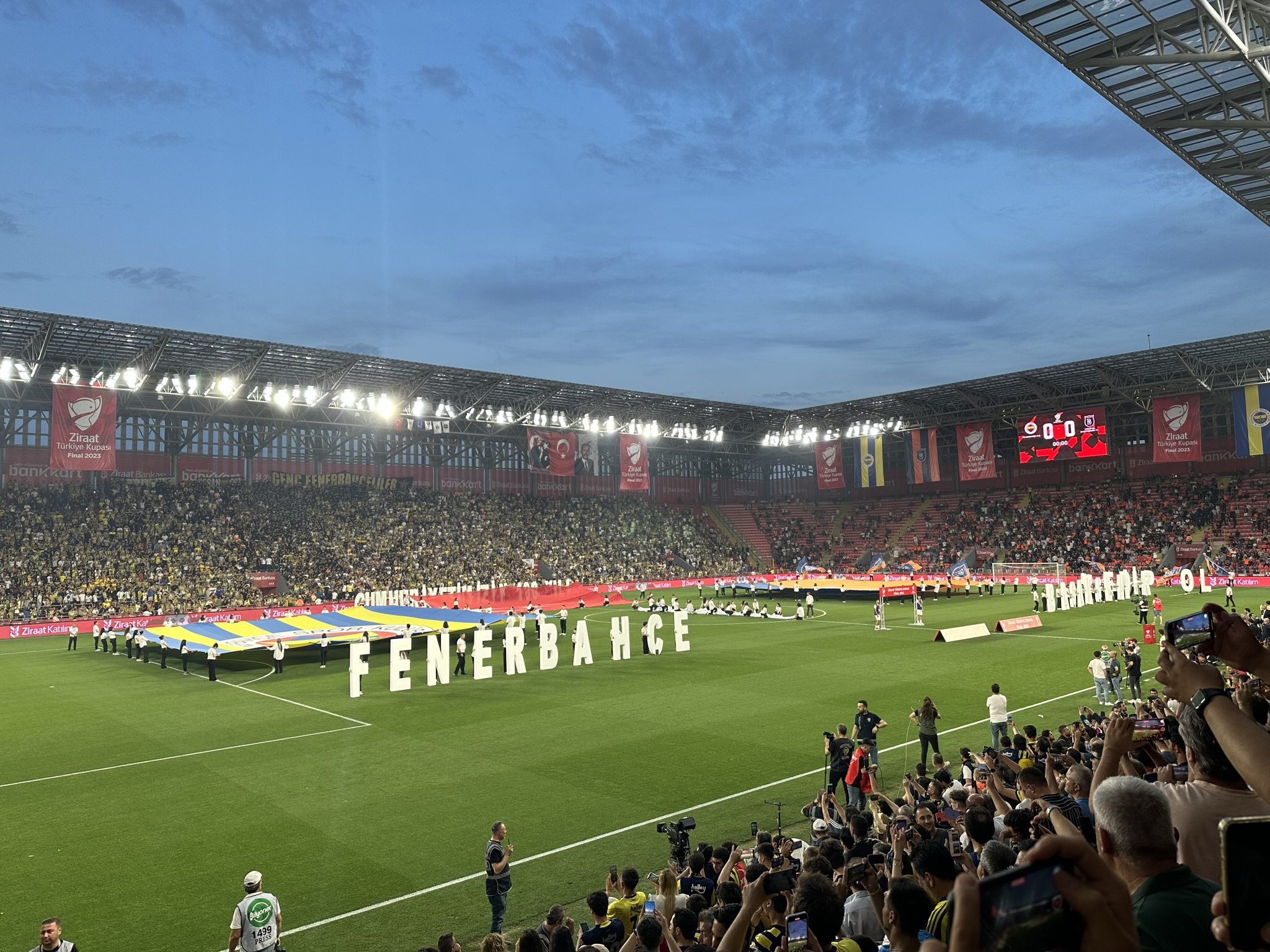
- Pre-game ceremony in Gürsel Aksel Stadium in İzmir
- Event: 2022–23 Turkish Cup
Fenerbahçe	İstanbul Başakşehir
2	0
- Date: 11 June 2023
- Venue: Gürsel Aksel Stadium, İzmir
- Man of the Match: Arda Güler (Fenerbahçe)
- Referee: Atilla Karaoğlan
- Attendance: 12,182
- Weather: Fair; 25 °C (77 °F); 50% humidity

The 2023 Turkish Cup final, was a football match that decided the winner of the 2022–23 Turkish Cup, the 61st edition of Turkey's primary football cup. The match, originally scheduled to be played on 1 June 2023, was rescheduled to 11 June 2023 due to a one-month break in Turkish football after the 2023 Turkey–Syria earthquake and was played at the Gürsel Aksel Stadium in İzmir between Fenerbahçe and İstanbul Başakşehir.

Fenerbahçe featured their first final appearance since 2018. İstanbul Başakşehir made its third Turkish Cup final appearance in history, having lost in 2017.

Fenerbahçe won the match 2–0 for their 7th Turkish Cup title.

== Route to the final ==
Fenerbahçe		Round	İstanbul Başakşehir
Opponent	Result	2022–23 Turkish Cup	Opponent	Result
İstanbulspor	3–1 (H)	Fifth round	Göztepe	3–1 (H)
Çaykur Rizespor	2–1 (H)	Round of 16	Fatih Karagümrük	2–2 (5–3 p) (A)
Kayserispor	4–1 (H)	Quarter-finals	Galatasaray	3–2 (A)
Sivasspor	0–0 (A), 3–0 (H)	Semi-finals	Ankaragücü	1–0 (H), 2–2 (A)

Key: (H) = Home; (A) = Away

== Match details ==
11 June 2023
20:45 TRT

Fenerbahçe	2–0	İstanbul Başakşehir
Batshuayi 1', 29'	Report

Gürsel Aksel Stadium, İzmir
Attendance: 12,182
Referee: Atilla Karaoğlan

Fenerbahçe	İstanbul Başakşehir

GK	70	(Turkey) İrfan Eğribayat
RB	4	(Turkey) Serdar Aziz	(yellow card) 88'
CB	41	(Hungary) Attila Szalai
CB	5	(Brazil) Willian Arão
LB	28	(Brazil) Luan Peres
CM	17	(Turkey) İrfan Kahveci		(substituted off) 85'
CM	26	(Slovenia) Miha Zajc	(yellow card) 14'	(substituted off) 74'
CM	7	(Turkey) Ferdi Kadıoğlu
AM	10	(Turkey) Arda Güler		(substituted off) 90'
CF	23	(Belgium) Michy Batshuayi		(substituted off) 90'
CF	13	(Ecuador) Enner Valencia (c)		(substituted off) 74'
Substitutes:
GK	54	(Turkey) Ertuğrul Çetin
DF	3	(Turkey) Samet Akaydin
DF	21	(Nigeria) Bright Osayi-Samuel		(substituted on) 74'
DF	24	(Netherlands) Jayden Oosterwolde
MF	8	(Turkey) Mert Hakan		(substituted on) 90'
MF	9	(Uruguay) Diego Rossi		(substituted on) 85'
MF	80	(Turkey) İsmail Yüksek		(substituted on) 74'
FW	19	(Turkey) Serdar Dursun		(substituted on) 90'
FW	20	(Italy) João Pedro
FW	99	(Turkey) Emre Mor
Manager:
(Portugal) Jorge Jesus

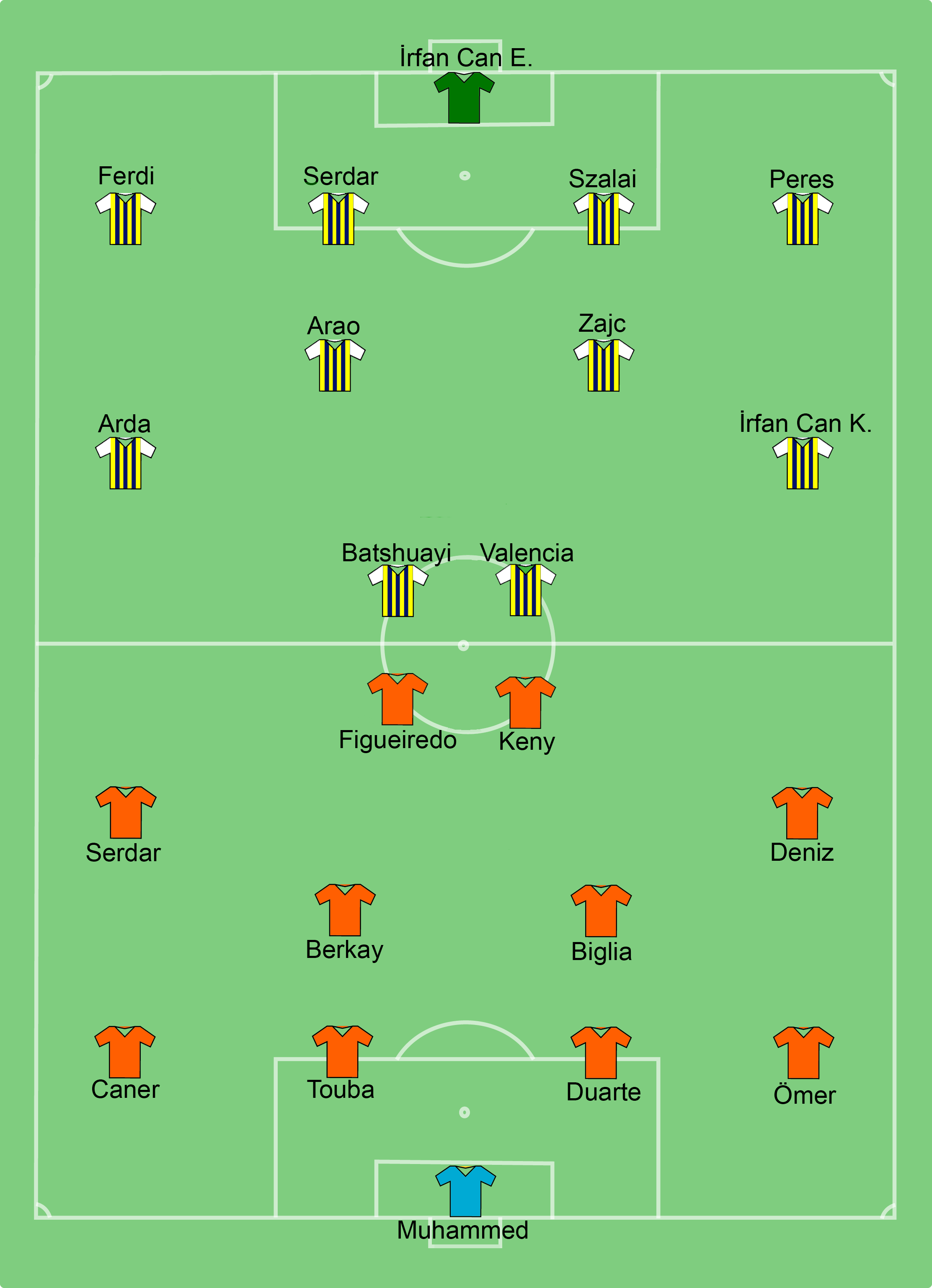

GK	16	(Turkey) Muhammed Şengezer
RB	42	(Turkey) Ömer Ali Şahiner
CB	5	(Brazil) Léo Duarte
CB	59	(Algeria) Ahmed Touba		(substituted off) 77'
LB	88	(Turkey) Caner Erkin		(substituted off) 34'
RM	7	(Turkey) Serdar Gürler		(substituted off) 34'
CM	19	(Turkey) Berkay Özcan
CM	20	(Argentina) Lucas Biglia (c)		(substituted off) 34'
LM	23	(Turkey) Deniz Türüç	(yellow card) 68'	(substituted off) 85'
CF	17	(Senegal) Philippe Kény	(yellow card) 88'
CF	25	(Brazil) João Figueiredo
Substitutes:
GK	1	(Turkey) Volkan Babacan
DF	2	(Turkey) Şener Özbayraklı		(substituted on) 85'
DF	4	(China) Wu Shaocong
DF	51	(Guinea-Bissau) Edgar Ié
DF	60	(Brazil) Lucas Lima		(substituted on) 34'
MF	8	(Serbia) Danijel Aleksić		(substituted on) 77'
MF	11	(Belgium) Adnan Januzaj		(substituted on) 34'
MF	72	(Israel) Eden Kartsev		(substituted on) 34'
MF	80	(Turkey) Berkay Aydoğmuş
FW	34	(Turkey) Muhammet Arslantaş
Manager:
(Turkey) Emre Belözoğlu

Man of the Match:
Arda Güler (Fenerbahçe)

Assistant referees:
Cevdet Kömürcüoğlu
Mehmet Emin Tuğral
Fourth official:
Volkan Bayraslan
Video assistant referee:
Hakan Ceylan
Assistant video assistant referees:
Hüseyin Göçek
Erdem Bayık

Match rules

- 90 minutes
- 30 minutes of extra time if necessary
- Penalty shoot-out if scores still level
- Ten named substitutes
- Maximum of five substitutions, with a sixth allowed in extra time (Note: Each team was given only three opportunities to make substitutions, with a fourth opportunity in extra time, excluding substitutions made at half-time, before the start of extra time and at half-time in extra time.)
