= Jo Jin-ho (footballer) =

South Korean footballer (born 2003)

Personal information
- Date of birth: 10 July 2003 (age 23)
- Place of birth: Seoul, South Korea
- Height: 1.72 m (5 ft 8 in)
- Positions: Right-back; midfielder

Team information
- Current team: Batman Petrolspor (on loan from Konyaspor)
- Number: 21

Youth career
- 2014–2015: Daedong Elementary School
- 2016–2022: Jeonbuk Hyundai Motors
- 2022–2023: Fenerbahçe

Senior career*
Years	Team	Apps	(Gls)
2023–2025	Fenerbahçe	0	(0)
2023–2024	→ Novi Pazar (loan)	21	(1)
2024–2025	→ Radnički Niš (loan)	30	(0)
2025–	Konyaspor	20	(1)
2026–	→ Batman Petrolspor (loan)	11	(0)

International career^{‡}
2016	South Korea U14	2	(2)
2018–2020	South Korea U17	9	(1)
2024	South Korea U23	6 (Note: Includes five appearances in Maurice Revello Tournament.)	(0)
- * Club domestic league appearances and goals as of 18 October 2026 ‡ National team caps and goals as of 9 June 2025 (UTC)

- Jo Jin-ho
- Hangul: 조진호
- RR: Jo Jinho
- MR: Cho Chinho

Jo Jin-ho (Korean: 조진호; born 10 July 2003) is a South Korean footballer who plays as a midfielder for Turkish TFF 1. Lig club Batman Petrolspor on loan from Konyaspor.

== Early life ==
Jo took an interest in football from a young age, first playing at the Daedong Elementary School in 2014. He was recruited by Jeonbuk Hyundai Motors ahead of the 2016 season, and spent six full seasons with the North Jeolla Province-based club.

== Club career ==
=== Fenerbahçe ===
In March 2022, after FIFA intervention, Jo signed an amateur contract with Turkish side Fenerbahçe. He played for Fenerbahçe's under-19 team at U19 Süper Lig, and reserve team at Rezerv Lig. On 17 February 2023, he signed a three-and-a-half-year professional contract.

==== Loan spells ====
On 15 September 2023, he was loaned out along with his teammate Omar Fayed to Serbian club Novi Pazar until the end of the 2023–24 season. He came face to face with his compatriots Hwang In-beom and Goh Young-jun, who played for Red Star Belgrade and Partizan at Serbian SuperLiga respectively. He scored his first professional goal in a 1–0 win over Radnički Niš on 11 November, and was selected for the SuperLiga Team of the Week after the match. At Novi Pazar, he played as a main player in the first half of the season, making 14 appearances in the first 16 league matches until February 2024. But his playing time decreased for the remainder of the season.

On 2 June 2024, he was loaned out to another Serbian club Radnički Niš for the 2024–25 season. He was taken into confidence at Radnički Niš, but Fenerbahçe decided not to extend his contract with them.

=== Konyaspor ===
On 16 July 2025, Jo signed a two-year contract with Süper Lig club Konyaspor. On 22 September, he came on as a 68th-minute substitute in a 3–1 loss to Galatasaray, making his Süper Lig debut. On 22 October, he made his first start at the Süper Lig in a 2–0 loss to Beşiktaş. On 1 May 2026, he scored his first goal for Konyaspor in a 3–2 loss to Çaykur Rizespor.

== International career ==
Jo has represented South Korea from under-14 to under-17 level.

== Style of play ==
Jo is considered to be a technically gifted player, has been likened to former Spanish international David Silva for his dribbling ability and range of passes.

== Career statistics ==
As of 17 May 2026

Appearances and goals by club, season and competition
Club	Season	League			Cup (Note: Includes Korean FA Cup, Turkish Cup and Serbian Cup)		Continental		Total	
Club	Season	Division	Apps	Goals	Apps	Goals	Apps	Goals	Apps	Goals
Fenerbahçe	2023–24	Süper Lig	—		—		—		—	
Novi Pazar (loan)	2023-24	Serbian SuperLiga	21	1	3	0	—		24	1
Radnički Niš (loan)	2024-25	Serbian SuperLiga	30	0	3	0	—		33	0
Konyaspor	2025–26	Süper Lig	20	1	5	0	—		25	1
Career total			71	2	11	0	0	0	82	2

== Honours ==
Konyaspor

- Turkish Cup runner-up: 2025–26
