= Tiago Çukur =

Turkish footballer (born 2002)

Personal information
- Full name: Tiago Süer Barbaros Çukur
- Date of birth: 30 November 2002 (age 23)
- Place of birth: Amsterdam, Netherlands
- Height: 6 ft 5 in (1.96 m)
- Position: Striker

Team information
- Current team: Fatih Karagümrük
- Number: 11

Youth career
- 2012–2016: Feyenoord
- 2016–2020: AZ
- 2021: Watford

Senior career*
Years	Team	Apps	(Gls)
2021–2022	Watford	0	(0)
2021–2022	→ Doncaster Rovers (loan)	21	(1)
2022–2024	Fenerbahçe	0	(0)
2022–2023	→ Dender (loan)	25	(5)
2023–2024	→ Beveren (loan)	18	(0)
2024	→ Ümraniyespor (loan)	9	(2)
2024–2025	Roda JC	31	(6)
2025–	Fatih Karagümrük	41	(2)

International career^{‡}
2019	Turkey U17	2	(0)
2021–2022	Turkey U21	6	(0)
2022	Turkey	1	(0)
- * Club domestic league appearances and goals as of 16:34, 11 November 2026 (UTC) ‡ National team caps and goals as of 17 June 2022

Tiago Süer Barbaros Çukur (born 30 November 2002) is a professional footballer who plays as a striker for TFF 1. Lig club Fatih Karagümrük. Born in the Netherlands, he represents Turkey at international level.

== Early and personal life ==
Born in Amsterdam, Çukur was born to a Turkish father and Dutch mother, and has joint Dutch and Turkish nationality. He is of Curaçaoan descent through his maternal grandfather.

== Club career ==
Çukur played youth football with Feyenoord and AZ, leaving the latter club in the summer of 2020, before signing for Watford in January 2021. He moved on loan to Doncaster Rovers in July 2021. Çukur returned to Watford on 11 January 2022, with Doncaster taking up the option to bring his loan to an end.

He signed for Turkish club Fenerbahçe in July 2022. In August 2022 he moved on loan to Belgian club Dender. On 7 July 2023, he returned to Belgium, signing on loan for Beveren. On 31 January 2024, the loan to Beveren was terminated early, and he moved on loan to Ümraniyespor.

On 15 July 2024, Çukur returned to the Netherlands, joining Eerste Divisie club Roda JC on a three-year contract. He scored on his competitive debut for the club on 12 August, in the season's opening fixture, despite Roda suffering a heavy 6–1 defeat to Jong AZ.

== International career ==
Çukur is a Turkish youth international, and made his under-21s debut in the summer of 2021. He made his senior debut on 14 June 2022.

== Career statistics ==
As of match played 8 November 2026

Appearances and goals by club, season and competition
Club	Season	League			National cup (Note: Includes FA Cup, Belgian Cup, KNVB Cup)		League cup (Note: Includes EFL Cup)		Other		Total	
Club	Season	Division	Apps	Goals	Apps	Goals	Apps	Goals	Apps	Goals	Apps	Goals
Watford	2021–22	Premier League	0	0	0	0	0	0	0	0	0	0
Doncaster Rovers (loan)	2021–22	League One	21	1	2	0	1	0	2 (Note: Appearances in EFL Trophy)	0	26	1
Fenerbahçe	2022–23	Süper Lig	0	0	0	0	—		0	0	0	0
Fenerbahçe	2023–24	Süper Lig	0	0	0	0	—		0	0	0	0
Fenerbahçe	Total		0	0	0	0	0	0	0	0	0	0
Dender (loan)	2022–23	Challenger Pro League	25	5	1	0	—		—		26	5
Beveren (loan)	2023–24	Challenger Pro League	18	0	1	0	—		—		19	0
Ümraniyespor (loan)	2023–24	TFF 1. Lig	9	2	0	0	—		—		9	2
Roda JC	2024–25	Eerste Divisie	31	6	1	0	—		—		32	6
Fatih Karagümrük	2025–26	Süper Lig	28	2	1	0	—		—		29	2
Fatih Karagümrük	2026–27	TFF 1. Lig	13	0	1	0	—		—		14	0
Fatih Karagümrük	Total		41	2	2	0	0	0	0	0	43	2
Career total			145	16	7	0	1	0	2	0	155	16
