= Omar Fayed (footballer) =

Egyptian footballer (born 2003)

Personal information
- Full name: Omar Fayed Abdelwahab El Rakhawy
- Date of birth: 4 July 2003 (age 23)
- Place of birth: Monufia, Egypt
- Height: 1.98 m (6 ft 6 in)
- Position: Centre-back

Team information
- Current team: Frosinone
- Number: 74

Youth career
- 2010–2016: Al Ahly
- 2016–2021: Al Mokawloon

Senior career*
| Years | Team | Apps | (Gls) |
| 2021–2023 | Al Mokawloon | 28 | (0) |
| 2023–2026 | Fenerbahçe | 0 | (0) |
| 2023–2024 | → Novi Pazar (loan) | 18 | (0) |
| 2024–2025 | → Beerschot (loan) | 12 | (0) |
| 2025–2026 | → Arouca (loan) | 8 | (0) |
| 2026– | Frosinone | 1 | (0) |

International career^{‡}
| 2022–2023 | Egypt U20 | 6 | (0) |
| 2023–2024 | Egypt U23 | 8 | (0) |
| 2024 | Egypt Olympic | 5 | (0) |
- * Club domestic league appearances and goals as of 16 October 2026 ‡ National team caps and goals as of 2 February 2025

Omar Fayed Abdelwahab El Rakhawy (Egyptian Arabic: عمر فايد عبد الوهاب الرخاوى; born 4 July 2003) is an Egyptian professional footballer who plays as a centre-back for Serie A club Frosinone.

== Club career ==
=== Al Mokawloon ===
Fayed began playing football as an academy product of the Al Mokawloon club and in 2022, he was promoted to the main squad.

=== Fenerbahçe ===
On 16 August 2023, he signed a four-year contract with Turkish club Fenerbahçe in the Süper Lig.

==== Loan to Novi Pazar ====
On 15 September 2023, he was loaned out along with his teammate Jo Jin-ho to Serbian club Novi Pazar until the end of the 2023–24 season.

On 1 November 2023, he made his debut with the team in a Serbian Cup match against Železničar Pančevo with 1–0 away win. On 26 November 2023, Fayed made his Serbian SuperLiga debut; playing the full 90 minutes against Radnički Niš in a 4–0 away victory.

==== Loan to Beerschot ====
Fenerbahçe announced that Fayed has been loaned to Beerschot until the end of the season.

On 18 October 2024, he made his Pro League debut against Belgian powerhouse Anderlecht in a 2–1 home win. On 30 October 2024, he made his Belgian Cup debut 90 mins performance against Challenger Pro League team RFC Liège in a 3–1 home win.

==== Loan to Arouca ====
On 14 August 2025, Primeira Liga club Arouca from Portugal loaned him with option to buy until the end of season.

On 18 October 2025, he made his debut in a 1–2 win away against Portimonense in the Taça de Portugal. On 25 October 2025, he made his Primeira Liga debut against Benfica.

=== Frosinone ===
On 19 August 2026, he signed a four-year contract with newly promoted Italian Serie A side Frosinone.

== International career ==
Fayed is a youth international for Egypt.

In July 2024, Rogério Micale selected him for the 2024 Olympic Games in Paris. Fayed started in all three group matches, as well as the quarter-final against Paraguay and the semi-final against France; he received a red card in semi-final.

On 21 September 2026, Fayed got called up for the Egyptian national team after their defender Hamdi Fathi got injured in training.

== Career statistics ==
As of 16 October 2026

Appearances and goals by club, season and competition
| Club | Season | League | | | National cup (Note: Includes Egypt Cup, Turkish Cup, Serbian Cup, Belgian Cup and Taça de Portugal) | | Continental | | Other (Note: Includes Taça da Liga) | | Total | |
| Club | Season | Division | Apps | Goals | Apps | Goals | Apps | Goals | Apps | Goals | Apps | Goals |
|---|---|---|---|---|---|---|---|---|---|---|---|---|
| Al Mokawloon Al Arab | 2021–22 | Egyptian Premier League | 3 | 0 | 1 | 0 | — | | — | | 4 | 0 |
| Al Mokawloon Al Arab | 2022–23 | Egyptian Premier League | 25 | 0 | 0 | 0 | — | | — | | 25 | 0 |
| Al Mokawloon Al Arab | Total | | 28 | 0 | 1 | 0 | 0 | 0 | 0 | 0 | 29 | 0 |
| Fenerbahçe | 2023–24 | Süper Lig | 0 | 0 | 0 | 0 | 0 | 0 | — | | 0 | 0 |
| Novi Pazar (loan) | 2023–24 | Serbian SuperLiga | 18 | 0 | 3 | 0 | — | | — | | 21 | 0 |
| Beerschot (loan) | 2024–25 | Belgian Pro League | 12 | 0 | 3 | 0 | — | | — | | 15 | 0 |
| Arouca (loan) | 2025–26 | Primeira Liga | 8 | 0 | 2 | 0 | — | | 0 | 0 | 10 | 0 |
| Frosinone | 2026–27 | Serie A | 1 | 0 | 1 | 0 | — | | — | | 2 | 0 |
| Career total | | | 67 | 0 | 10 | 0 | 0 | 0 | 0 | 0 | 77 | 0 |
