= İrfan Can Eğribayat =

Turkish footballer (born 1998)

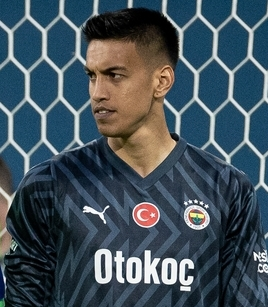
- Eğribayat with Fenerbahçe in 2023

Personal information
- Date of birth: 30 June 1998 (age 28)
- Place of birth: Seyhan, Turkey
- Height: 1.93 m (6 ft 4 in)
- Position: Goalkeeper

Team information
- Current team: Gençlerbirliği
- Number: 70

Youth career
- 2007–2015: Adanaspor

Senior career*
Years	Team	Apps	(Gls)
2014–2020	Adanaspor	64	(0)
2020–2023	Göztepe	65	(0)
2022–2023	→ Fenerbahçe (loan)	8	(0)
2023–2026	Fenerbahçe	19	(0)
2026	→ Samsunspor (loan)	3	(0)
2026–	Gençlerbirliği	8	(0)

International career
2014	Turkey U16	6	(0)
2014–2015	Turkey U17	2	(0)
2015	Turkey U18	5	(0)
2016	Turkey U19	4	(0)
2018	Turkey U21	2	(0)
- * Club domestic league appearances and goals as of 17 October 2026

İrfan Can Eğribayat (born 30 June 1998) is a Turkish professional footballer who plays as a goalkeeper for Süper Lig club Gençlerbirliği.

== Club career ==
=== Adanaspor ===
Eğribayat started his football career in the youth level with Adanaspor. He signed a professional contract with the team in 2014, and made his debut for Adanaspor in a 4-3 TFF First League win over Elazığspor on 16 May 2015.

He made his Süper Lig debut in a 1–1 tie with Konyaspor on 20 May 2017.

=== Göztepe ===
On 5 September 2020, he transferred to Göztepe in the Süper Lig. He made his debut with the team in a 5–1 win over Denizlispor on 12 September 2020. In his debut season with Göztepe, Eğribayat earned the starting spot and gained international attention for his performances.

On 6 December 2021, after the Süper Lig match against Gaziantep FK, Eğribayat said to TV broadcasters that his pregnant wife, Ceren Eğribayat, experienced the pain of losing their baby when she was 5.5 months pregnant.

=== Fenerbahçe ===
On 3 August 2022, he transferred to Süper Lig powerhouse Fenerbahçe on a one-year loan for €500K with option to buy. He made his debut for the team in a 3-1 Turkish Cup win over Istanbulspor on 20 December 2022. He made his Süper Lig debut for the team in a 2–1 win over Ankaragücü on 15 April 2023.

On 12 May 2023, Fenerbahçe exercised the €1.2M buyout clause in his contract and Eğribayat signed a four-year deal with the club. On 15 June 2023, Fenerbahçe officially announced his permanent joining.

He made his continental debut in a 3–0 UEFA Europa Conference League win over NK Maribor on 17 August 2023. He also saved a penalty in the match.

On 23 January 2025, he made his UEFA Europa League debut in a 0–0 tie against Olympique Lyonnais in Şükrü Saraçoğlu Stadium.

On 1 August 2026, he cancelled his contract with the team and became a free agent.

==== Loan to Samsunspor ====
On 9 January 2026, he loaned to Samsunspor until the end of season with option to buy.

== International career ==
Eğribayat is a youth international for Turkey, having represented the Turkey U16s, U17s, U18s, U19s and U21s.

== Career statistics ==
As of match played 8 November 2026

Appearances and goals by club, season and competition
Club	Season	League			Turkish Cup		Europe		Other		Total	
Club	Season	Division	Apps	Goals	Apps	Goals	Apps	Goals	Apps	Goals	Apps	Goals
Adanaspor	2014–15	TFF 1. Lig	2	0	0	0	—		—		2	0
Adanaspor	2015–16	TFF 1. Lig	2	0	1	0	—		—		3	0
Adanaspor	2016–17	Süper Lig	2	0	0	0	—		—		2	0
Adanaspor	2017–18	TFF 1. Lig	22	0	0	0	—		—		22	0
Adanaspor	2018–19	TFF 1. Lig	19	0	1	0	—		—		20	0
Adanaspor	2019–20	TFF 1. Lig	17	0	3	0	—		—		20	0
Adanaspor	Total		64	0	5	0	—		—		69	0
Göztepe	2020–21	Süper Lig	35	0	0	0	—		—		35	0
Göztepe	2021–22	Süper Lig	30	0	2	0	—		—		32	0
Göztepe	Total		65	0	2	0	—		—		67	0
Fenerbahçe (loan)	2022–23	Süper Lig	8	0	5	0	0	0	0	0	13	0
Fenerbahçe	2023–24	Süper Lig	3	0	3	0	7 (Note: Appearances in UEFA Europa Conference League)	0	0	0	13	0
Fenerbahçe	2024–25	Süper Lig	13	0	2	0	6 (Note: Appearances in UEFA Europa League)	0	—		21	0
Fenerbahçe	2025–26	Süper Lig	3	0	0	0	3 (Note: Appearances in UEFA Champions League)	0	—		6	0
Fenerbahçe	Fenerbahçe total		27	0	10	0	16	0	0	0	53	0
Samsunspor (loan)	2025–26	Süper Lig	3	0	1	0	0	0	—		4	0
Gençlerbirliği	2026–27	Süper Lig	11	0	0	0	—		—		11	0
Career total			170	0	18	0	16	0	0	0	204	0

== Honours ==
Adanaspor

- TFF First League: 2015–16

Fenerbahçe

- Turkish Cup: 2022–23
