= Furkan Onur Akyüz =

Turkish footballer (born 2005)

Personal information
- Date of birth: 21 September 2005 (age 21)
- Place of birth: Yıldırım, Türkiye
- Height: 1.91 m (6 ft 3 in)
- Position: Goalkeeper

Team information
- Current team: Sarıyer
- Number: 97

Youth career
- 2016–2020: TSE Arabayatağıspor
- 2020–2022: Fenerbahçe

Senior career*
Years	Team	Apps	(Gls)
2022–2025	Fenerbahçe	1	(0)
2024–2025	→ Fatih Karagümrük (loan)	3	(0)
2025–	Sarıyer	11	(0)
- * Club domestic league appearances and goals as of 6 November 2026

Furkan Onur Akyüz (born 21 September 2005) is a Turkish professional footballer who plays as a goalkeeper for TFF 1. Lig club Sarıyer.

== Club career ==
Akyüz is a youth product of TSE Arabayatağı Spor, and moved to the youth academy of Fenerbahçe in 2020. On 5 August 2022, he signed his first professional contract with Fenerbahçe and was promoted to their first team as third goalkeeper. He was on the bench for a Süper Lig match away against Trabzonspor on 17 March 2024, and got in an altercation with fans that rushed on the field to abuse the players. He made his senior and professional debut with Fenerbahçe as captain in the controversial 2023 Turkish Super Cup match on 7 April 2024. Fenerbahçe fielded a U19 side in protest of conditions in Turkish football, and forfeited in the first minute after conceding a goal.
