= Burak Kapacak =

Turkish footballer

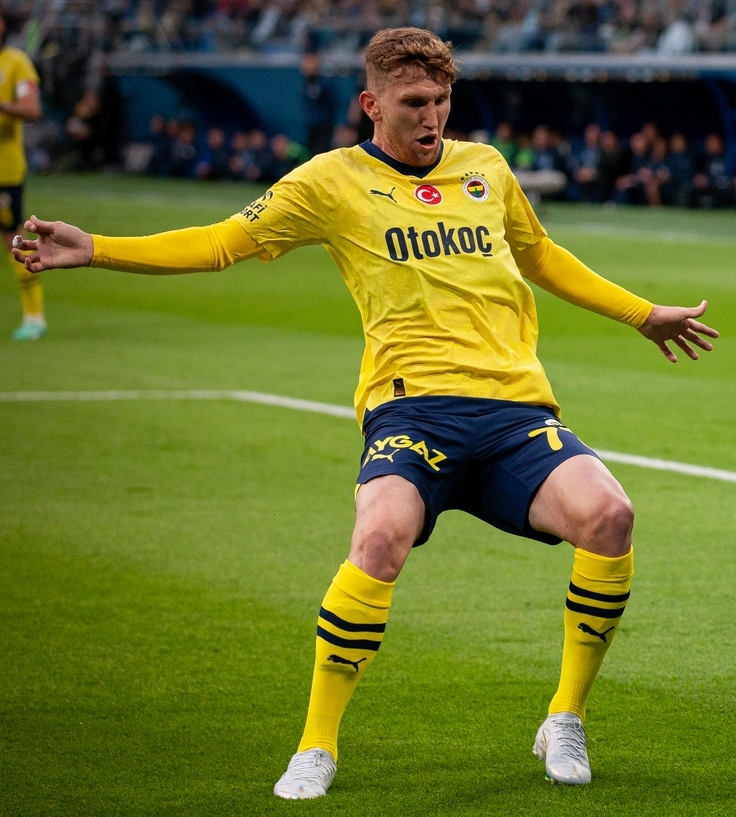

Personal information
- Date of birth: 8 December 1999 (age 26)
- Place of birth: Osmangazi, Turkey
- Height: 1.80 m (5 ft 11 in)
- Position: Winger

Team information
- Current team: Sivasspor
- Number: 11

Youth career
- 2012: Tuna Gençlikspor
- 2012–2014: Altinsaban
- 2014–2018: Bursaspor

Senior career*
Years	Team	Apps	(Gls)
2018–2021	Bursaspor	75	(7)
2021–2026	Fenerbahçe	7	(0)
2022–2023	→ Fatih Karagümrük (loan)	13	(1)
2023–2024	→ Sivasspor (loan)	18	(0)
2025–2026	→ Kayserispor (loan)	8	(0)
2026	Kayserispor	4	(0)
2026–	Sivasspor	12	(0)

International career^{‡}
2016	Turkey U17	3	(0)
2017	Turkey U18	4	(0)
2017–2018	Turkey U19	5	(0)
2020	Turkey U21	2	(0)
- * Club domestic league appearances and goals as of 1 November 2026 ‡ National team caps and goals as of 17 November 2020

Burak Kapacak (born 8 December 1999) is a Turkish professional footballer who plays as a winger for TFF 1. Lig club Sivasspor.

== Professional career ==
A youth product of Bursaspor, Burak signed his first professional contract on 26 March 2018. Kapacak made his professional debut for Bursaspor in a 1-0 Süper Lig loss to Gençlerbirliği S.K. on 18 May 2018.

=== Fenerbahçe ===
On 6 August 2021, Fenerbahçe announced that they had signed an agreement with Kapacak.

=== Kayserispor ===
In August 2025 the player moved on loan to Central Anatolian side Kayserispor.
