= Erdem Canpolat =

German footballer (born 2001)

Personal information
- Date of birth: 13 April 2001 (age 25)
- Place of birth: Duisburg, Germany
- Height: 1.94 m (6 ft 4 in)
- Position: Goalkeeper

Team information
- Current team: Esenler Erokspor (on loan from Çaykur Rizespor)
- Number: 22

Youth career
- 2012–2014: VfL Bochum
- 2014–2015: Hamborn 07
- 2015–2020: Schalke 04

Senior career*
Years	Team	Apps	(Gls)
2020–2023	Kasımpaşa	14	(0)
2023–2025	Pendikspor	58	(0)
2025–	Çaykur Rizespor	7	(0)
2026–	→ Esenler Erokspor (loan)	11	(0)
- * Club domestic league appearances and goals as of 19 October 2026

Erdem Canpolat (born 13 April 2001) is a German professional footballer who plays as a goalkeeper for Turkish TFF 1. Lig club Esenler Erokspor on loan from Çaykur Rizespor.

== Career ==
Canpolat is a youth product of VfL Bochum, Hamborn 07, and Schalke 04. On 15 September 2020, he transferred to the Turkish club Kasımpaşa. He made his first senior debut with Kasımpaşa in a 3–0 Turkish Cup win over 24 Erzincanspor on 26 November 2020. He made his professional debut with Gaziantep in a 2–1 Süper Lig loss to Sivasspor on 15 May 2021.

On 9 July 2023, he signed with Süper Lig club Pendikspor.

== Personal life ==
Born in Germany, Canpolat is of Turkish descent.

== Career statistics ==
As of match played 31 January 2026

Appearances and goals by club, season and competition
Club	Season	League			National cup		Europe		Other		Total	
Club	Season	Division	Apps	Goals	Apps	Goals	Apps	Goals	Apps	Goals	Apps	Goals
Kasımpaşa	2020–21	Süper Lig	1	0	1	0	—		—		2	0
Kasımpaşa	2021–22	Süper Lig	3	0	2	0	—		—		5	0
Kasımpaşa	2022–23	Süper Lig	10	0	1	0	—		—		11	0
Kasımpaşa	Total		14	0	4	0	—		—		18	0
Pendikspor	2023–24	Süper Lig	34	0	0	0	—		—		34	0
Pendikspor	2024–25	TFF 1. Lig	24	0	0	0	—		—		24	0
Pendikspor	Total		58	0	0	0	—		—		58	0
Çaykur Rizespor	2025–26	Süper Lig	7	0	6	0	—		—		13	0
Career total			79	0	10	0	0	0	0	0	89	0
