= Samet Akaydin =

Turkish footballer (born 1994)

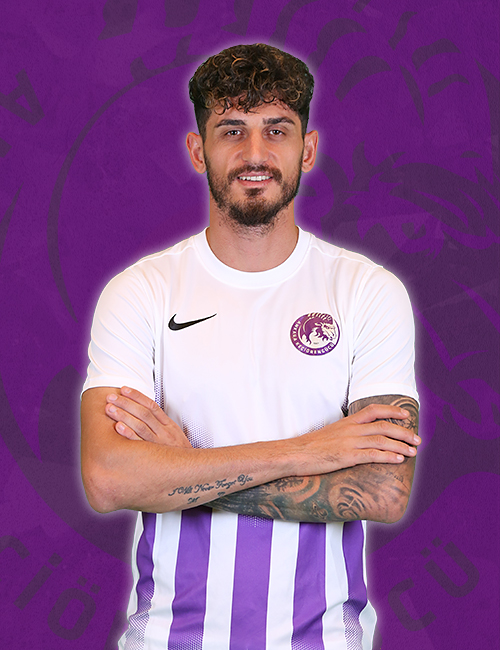
- Akaydin with Ankara Keçiörengücü in 2020

Personal information
- Full name: Samet Akaydin
- Date of birth: 13 March 1994 (age 32)
- Place of birth: Trabzon, Turkey
- Height: 1.90 m (6 ft 3 in)
- Position: Centre-back

Team information
- Current team: Trabzonspor
- Number: 4

Youth career
- 2004–2009: İdmanocağı
- 2009–2010: Trabzonspor
- 2010–2011: İdmanocağı
- 2011–2013: Boluspor

Senior career*
| Years | Team | Apps | (Gls) |
| 2013–2014 | Arsinspor | 4 | (0) |
| 2014–2018 | Sancaktepe | 131 | (9) |
| 2018–2019 | Şanlıurfaspor | 34 | (3) |
| 2019–2021 | Ankara Keçiörengücü | 49 | (4) |
| 2021–2023 | Adana Demirspor | 55 | (4) |
| 2023–2025 | Fenerbahçe | 32 | (1) |
| 2024 | → Panathinaikos (loan) | 12 | (0) |
| 2025–2026 | Çaykur Rizespor | 43 | (4) |
| 2026– | Trabzonspor | 0 | (0) |

International career^{‡}
| 2022– | Turkey | 19 | (1) |
- * Club domestic league appearances and goals as of 16:11, 17 August 2026 (UTC) ‡ National team caps and goals as of 1 June 2026

Samet Akaydin (born 13 March 1994) is a Turkish professional footballer who plays as a centre-back for Süper Lig club Trabzonspor and the Turkey national team.

== Club career ==
Akaydin began his youth career with Black Sea Region-based clubs Trabzon İdmanocağı, Trabzonspor, Boluspor and started his professional career with hometown club Arsinspor. He played four seasons with Istanbul-based club Sancaktepe, one season with Şanlıurfaspor, one and a half seasons with Ankara Keçiörengücü.

=== Adana Demirspor ===
Akaydin moved to Süper Lig side Adana Demirspor until the end of the 2023-24 season. On 23 January 2021, he made his debut against Bursaspor. On 18 September 2021, he made his Süper Lig debut against Rizespor in a 3–1 win.

He made 49 Süper Lig (with 4 goals) and 6 TFF First League appearances with the team and also made three Turkish cup appearances and one goal. He was selected to the national team.

=== Fenerbahçe ===
On 4 December 2023, Akaydin signed Turkish powerhouse Fenerbahçe, until the end of the 2026–27 season. He made his Süper Lig debut for the team in a 2–1 away game win over Gaziantep FK on 15 January 2023.

On 9 March 2023, he made his continental debut in the UEFA Europa League round of 16 match against Sevilla.

On 10 November 2024, he scored his first goal with the team against Sivasspor.

==== Panathinaikos (loan) ====
On 14 January 2024, Akaydin joined Greek side Panathinaikos on loan from Fenerbahçe, until the end of the 2023–24 season.

He was excluded from the squad due to his Mustafa Kemal Atatürk social media post for Commemoration of Atatürk, Youth and Sports Day on 19 May 2024. Panathinaikos asked him to remove his post but he didn't accept the club's request and did not remove the post, then he was excluded from the main squad. Akaydin, who informed Fenerbahçe that he wanted to leave Panathinaikos after what happened, decided to return to Turkey.

=== Trabzonspor ===
On 13 June 2026, it was announced that Akaydin would join Trabzonspor on a two-year deal with the club holding an option for a third year upon the expiration of his contract with Çaykur Rizespor.

== International career ==
Akaydin debuted with the Turkey national team in a friendly 2–1 win over the Czech Republic on 19 November 2022.

Akaydin was selected to represent his nation at the UEFA Euro 2024. Notably, he scored an own goal past Altay Bayındır from outside the box in the nation's 3–0 loss to Portugal during the group stage. On 6 July, he scored his first international goal, by opening the score in a 2–1 defeat against the Netherlands in the quarter-final of the competition.

On 2 June 2026, Akaydin was selected in the 26-man squad for the 2026 FIFA World Cup.

== Style of play ==
Akaydin is a quick, aggressive, physically strong, and tenacious defender, who was known for his work-rate, energy, and hard-tackling style of play. Due to his height, he was also an aerial threat on set-pieces.

== Career statistics ==
=== Club ===
As of 11 December 2024

Appearances and goals by club, season and competition
| Club | Season | League | | | National cup (Note: Includes Turkish Cup and Greek Cup) | | Europe | | Total | |
| Club | Season | Division | Apps | Goals | Apps | Goals | Apps | Goals | Apps | Goals |
|---|---|---|---|---|---|---|---|---|---|---|
| Arsinspor | 2013–14 | TFF Third League | 4 | 0 | 0 | 0 | — | | 4 | 0 |
| Sancaktepe | 2014–15 | TFF Third League | 33 | 3 | 1 | 0 | — | | 34 | 3 |
| Sancaktepe | 2015–16 | TFF Third League | 34 | 4 | 1 | 0 | — | | 35 | 4 |
| Sancaktepe | 2016–17 | TFF Third League | 32 | 0 | 7 | 0 | — | | 39 | 0 |
| Sancaktepe | 2017–18 | TFF Second League | 32 | 2 | 0 | 0 | — | | 32 | 2 |
| Sancaktepe | Total | | 131 | 9 | 9 | 0 | — | | 140 | 9 |
| Şanlıurfaspor | 2018–19 | TFF Second League | 34 | 3 | 0 | 0 | — | | 34 | 3 |
| Ankara Keçiörengücü | 2019–20 | TFF First League | 33 | 3 | 0 | 0 | — | | 33 | 3 |
| Ankara Keçiörengücü | 2020–21 | TFF First League | 16 | 1 | 0 | 0 | — | | 16 | 1 |
| Ankara Keçiörengücü | Total | | 49 | 4 | 0 | 0 | — | | 49 | 4 |
| Adana Demirspor | 2020–21 | TFF First League | 6 | 0 | 0 | 0 | — | | 6 | 0 |
| Adana Demirspor | 2021–22 | Süper Lig | 33 | 2 | 2 | 1 | — | | 35 | 3 |
| Adana Demirspor | 2022–23 | Süper Lig | 16 | 2 | 1 | 0 | — | | 17 | 2 |
| Adana Demirspor | Total | | 55 | 4 | 3 | 1 | — | | 58 | 5 |
| Fenerbahçe | 2022–23 | Süper Lig | 17 | 0 | 4 | 0 | 2 (Note: Appearances in UEFA Europa League) | 0 | 23 | 0 |
| Fenerbahçe | 2023–24 | Süper Lig | 10 | 0 | 0 | 0 | 1 (Note: Appearances in UEFA Conference League) | 0 | 11 | 0 |
| Fenerbahçe | 2024–25 | Süper Lig | 5 | 1 | 0 | 0 | 2 | 0 | 7 | 1 |
| Fenerbahçe | Total | | 32 | 1 | 4 | 0 | 5 | 0 | 41 | 1 |
| Panathinaikos (loan) | 2023–24 | Super League Greece | 12 | 0 | 3 | 0 | — | | 15 | 0 |
| Career total | | | 289 | 21 | 19 | 1 | 5 | 0 | 313 | 22 |

=== International ===
As of match played 1 June 2026

Appearances and goals by national team and year
| National team | Year | Apps | Goals |
|---|---|---|---|
| Turkey | 2022 | 1 | 0 |
| Turkey | 2023 | 3 | 0 |
| Turkey | 2024 | 8 | 1 |
| Turkey | 2025 | 5 | 0 |
| Turkey | 2026 | 2 | 0 |
| Total | | 19 | 1 |

Scores and results list Turkey's goal tally first, score column indicates score after each Akaydin goal.

List of international goals scored by Samet Akaydin
| No. | Date | Venue | Cap | Opponent | Score | Result | Competition |
|---|---|---|---|---|---|---|---|
| 1 | 6 July 2024 | Olympiastadion, Berlin, Germany | 10 | Netherlands | 1–0 | 1–2 | UEFA Euro 2024 |

== Honours ==
Sancaktepe

- TFF Third League: 2016–17

Adanademirspor

- TFF First League: 2020–21

Fenerbahçe

- Turkish Cup: 2022–23

Panathinaikos

- Greek Cup: 2023–24
