= Emre Demir =

Turkish professional footballer

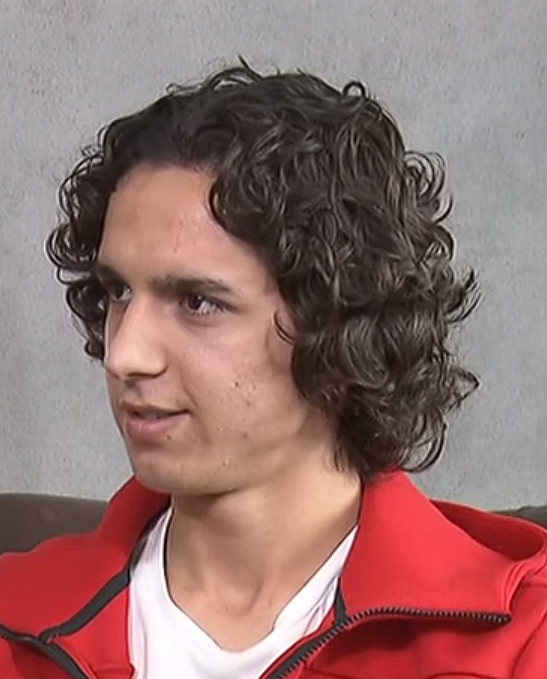
- Demir in 2021

Personal information
- Full name: Emre Demir
- Date of birth: 15 January 2004 (age 22)
- Place of birth: Mersin, Turkey
- Height: 1.75 m (5 ft 9 in)
- Positions: Attacking midfielder; winger

Team information
- Current team: Alanyaspor
- Number: 14

Youth career
- 2010–2012: Mersin
- 2012–2019: Kayserispor

Senior career*
Years	Team	Apps	(Gls)
2019–2022	Kayserispor	30	(1)
2022–2023	Barcelona B	2	(0)
2023–2026	Fenerbahçe	0	(0)
2023	→ Samsunspor (loan)	2	(1)
2023–2024	→ Ümraniyespor (loan)	28	(2)
2024–2026	→ Sakaryaspor (loan)	62	(12)
2026–	Alanyaspor	0	(0)

International career^{‡}
2016	Turkey U14	3	(1)
2017–2018	Turkey U15	11	(5)
2018–2019	Turkey U16	14	(0)
2019	Turkey U17	8	(0)
2021–2024	Turkey U19	12	(1)
2024–	Turkey U21	1	(0)
- * Club domestic league appearances and goals as of 7 May 2026 ‡ National team caps and goals as of 15 November 2024

Emre Demir (born 15 January 2004) is a Turkish professional footballer who plays as an attacking midfielder or a winger for Turkish club Alanyaspor.

== Club career ==
=== Early career ===
Demir started playing football with his local club Mersin at the age of 6, and moved to Kayserispor 2 years later. As a youth talent, he attended trials at Barcelona and Paris Saint-Germain.

=== Kayserispor ===
On 18 January 2019, Demir signed his first professional contract with Kayserispor aged 15. One week after his 15th birthday, Demir made his professional debut with Kayserispor in a 0-0 Turkish Cup tie with Akhisarspor on 22 January 2019, playing the final three minutes of the match.

On 9 November 2019, aged 15 years and 299 days, he became the youngest goalscorer in Süper Lig history when he scored against Gençlerbirliği.

=== Barcelona ===
On 23 September 2021, Barcelona Atlètic announced an agreement with Kayserispor to sign Demir for the 2022–23 season for a fee of 2 million euros. On 14 July 2022, Demir signed a five-year deal, with a buyout clause of €400 million.

=== Fenerbahçe ===
Having not managed to break through Barcelona's team consistently, on 31 January 2023 Demir returned to Turkey, joining Süper Lig club Fenerbahçe on a free transfer and signing a four-and-a-half-year deal.

==== Samsunspor (loan) ====
On 3 February 2023, he was loaned to TFF First League club Samsunspor, until the end of the season.

==== Ümraniyespor (loan) ====
On 15 September 2023, he joined Ümraniyespor on loan for the 2023–24 season.

=== Alanyaspor ===
On 25 August 2026, he signed a 3-year contract with Alanyaspor.

== Club statistics ==
As of match played 7 May 2026

Appearances and goals by club, season and competition
Club	Season	League			Cup		Europe		Other		Total	
Club	Season	Division	Apps	Goals	Apps	Goals	Apps	Goals	Apps	Goals	Apps	Goals
Kayserispor	2018–19	Süper Lig	1	0	1	0	–		–		2	0
Kayserispor	2019–20	Süper Lig	11	1	2	0	–		–		13	1
Kayserispor	2020–21	Süper Lig	14	0	2	2	–		–		16	2
Kayserispor	2021–22	Süper Lig	4	0	2	1	–		–		7	1
Kayserispor	Total		30	1	7	3	0	0	0	0	37	4
Barcelona Atlètic	2022–23	Primera Federación	2	0	–		–		–		2	0
Fenerbahçe	2022–23	Süper Lig	0	0	0	0	0	0	–		0	0
Samsunspor (loan)	2022–23	TFF First League	2	1	–		–		–		2	1
Ümraniyespor (loan)	2023–24	TFF First League	28	2	3	1	–		–		31	3
Sakaryaspor (loan)	2024–25	TFF First League	32	9	0	0	–		–		32	9
Sakaryaspor (loan)	2025–26	TFF First League	30	3	2	1	–		–		32	4
Sakaryaspor (loan)	Total		62	12	2	1	0	0	0	0	64	13
Career total			124	16	12	5	0	0	0	0	136	21
