= 2024–25 Fenerbahçe S.K. season =

Fenerbahçe
2024–25 season
- President: Ali Koç
- Head coach: José Mourinho
- Stadium: Şükrü Saracoğlu Stadium
- Süper Lig: 2nd
- Turkish Cup: Quarter-finals
- UEFA Champions League: Third qualifying round
- UEFA Europa League: Round of 16
- Top goalscorer: League: Youssef En-Nesyri (20); All: Youssef En-Nesyri (30)
- Highest home attendance: 44,283 (vs. Galatasaray, 21 September 2024, Süper Lig)
- Lowest home attendance: 26,744 (vs. Hatayspor, 5 January 2025, Süper Lig)
- Average home league attendance: 33,571
- Biggest win: 5–0 (vs. Çaykur Rizespor (A), 25 August 2024, Süper Lig vs. Erzurumspor (H), 5 February 2025, Turkish Cup)
- Biggest defeat: 1–3 (vs. Galatasaray (H), 21 September 2024, Süper Lig vs. AZ (A), 7 November 2024, Europa League vs. Rangers (H), 6 March 2025, Europa League); 0–2 (vs. Athletic Bilbao (H), 11 December 2024, Europa League)
Home colours	Away colours	Third colours

The 2024–25 season was the 118th season in the existence of Fenerbahçe, and the club's 67th consecutive season in the top flight of Turkish football. In addition to the domestic league, Fenerbahçe participated in this season's edition of the Turkish Cup, UEFA Champions League and UEFA Europa League.

== Club ==
=== Staff ===
Position	Staff
Sporting Director	(Portugal) Mário Branco
Assistant Sporting Director	(Turkey) Okan Özkan
Administrative Manager	(Turkey) Emir Yolaç
Head Coach	(Portugal) José Mourinho
Assistant Coach	(Italy) Salvatore Foti
Assistant Coach	(Italy) Luca Fatiga
Assistant Coach	(Turkey) Zeki Murat Göle
Athletic Coach	(Italy) Stefano Rapetti
Athletic Coach	(Turkey) Halil Filik
Athletic Coach	(Turkey) Cihan Mert Cengiz
Chief Analyst	(Italy) Michele Salzarulo
Chief Analyst	(Italy) Giovanni Cerra
Performance Manager	(Portugal) Ricardo Formosinho
Analysis Specialist	(Turkey) Melikşah Sezgin
Analyst	(Turkey) Mehmet Turhan Demir
Goalkeeping Coach	(Croatia) Sandro Žufić
Goalkeeping Coach	(Turkey) Yasin Cirav
Media Officer	(Turkey) Alper Yemeniciler
Interpreter	(Turkey) Sinan Levi
Interpreter	(Turkey) Saruhan Karaman
Doctor	(Turkey) Dr. Osman İlhan
Doctor	(Turkey) Dr. Ahmet Kulduk
Physiotherapist	(Turkey) Umut Şahin
Physiotherapist	(Turkey) Ata Özgür Ercan
Physiotherapist	(Turkey) Melih Bayır
Nutritionist	(Turkey) Şengül Sangu Talak
Masseur	(Turkey) Özkan Alaca
Masseur	(Turkey) Veysel Çabşek
Masseur	(Turkey) Eyüp Emre Yeşiller
Masseur	(Turkey) Selçuk Açarol
Material Manager	(Turkey) Dursun Çetin
Material Manager	(Turkey) Erdal Kurt
Material Manager	(Turkey) Rıfat Bayraklı

Last updated: 28 July 2024
Source: Fenerbahce.org

== Kits ==
Fenerbahçe's 2024–25 kits, manufactured by Puma, were unveiled on 24 June 2024 and went on sale on the same day.

- Supplier: Puma
- Main sponsor: Otokoç
- Side sponsor: Safiport
- Back sponsor: Halley
- Sleeve sponsor: Nesine, Alpet
- Shorts sponsor: Pürsu, Pasha Group
- Socks sponsor: Gedik Yatırım

Home
Home alt.
Away
Away alt.
Third
Goalkeeper 1
Goalkeeper 2
Goalkeeper 3

== Season overview ==
=== Pre-season ===
On 31 May, Fenerbahçe announced that they parted ways with head coach İsmail Kartal. Two days later, the club announced the appointment of José Mourinho as head coach.

On 21 June, Fenerbahçe extended Mert Hakan Yandaş's contract by two years, expiring in 2026. On the same day, Levent Mercan signed from Fatih Karagümrük on a contract until 2028. On 23 June, Fenerbahçe's pre-season schedule was announced. After undergoing health checks in Istanbul on 22 June, the team traveled to the Düzce Topuk Yaylasi for the first part of pre-season camp on 24 June and played a friendly against Petrolul Ploiești, winning 2–1, with goals from Edin Džeko and Miha Zajc. The team then traveled to Graz for the second part of the pre-season training on 2 July, where they played friendlies against Admira Wacker, Hajduk Split and Strasbourg, respectively. On 6 July, Fenerbahçe drew 1–1 with Admira Wacker, with Edin Džeko scoring a penalty. On 10 July, Fenerbahçe lost 1–0 to Hajduk Split, and three days later, Fenerbahçe defeated Strasbourg 4–0, with Sebastian Szymański, Dušan Tadić, Ryan Kent and Edin Džeko scoring the team's goals.

On 1 July, Çağlar Söyüncü transferred to the club from Atlético Madrid and signed a contract until 2027. On 8 July, Fenerbahçe announced that Serdar Aziz had left the pre-season camp after a meeting with Mourinho and was given permission to seek a move to another club. On 11 July, the club's 2024–25 Süper Lig season fixture was announced, with Fenerbahçe playing against Adana Demirspor in the first match of the new season. On 16 July, Cenk Tosun signed from Beşiktaş on a contract until 2026. On the same day, Oğuz Aydın signed from Alanyaspor on a contract until 2028. A day later, Allan Saint-Maximin joined the team on loan from Al-Ahli until the end of the season. On 18 July, Fenerbahçe defeated Hull City 5–1 in their last pre-season friendly match, with Džeko scoring a double and goals from Fred, Szymański and Yandaş.

=== July ===
On 23 July, Fenerbahçe defeated Lugano 4–3 away in the first leg of the UEFA Champions League second qualifying round, with a hat-trick from Edin Džeko and a single goal from Ferdi Kadıoğlu. On 25 July, Youssef En-Nesyri signed from Sevilla on a contract until 2029. A day later, Fenerbahçe announced the departure of Umut Nayir to Konyaspor. On 30 July, Fenerbahçe defeated Lugano 2–1 at home in the second leg of the UEFA Champions League second qualifying round with goals from Edin Džeko and Sebastian Szymański. The team advanced to the third qualifying round with an aggregate score of 6–4 at the end of the two legs.

=== August ===
On 6 August, Fenerbahçe lost 2–1 away to Lille in the first leg of the UEFA Champions League third qualifying round. The team's only goal was scored by İrfan Kahveci. On 10 August, Fenerbahçe defeated Adana Demirspor 1–0 at home, with a goal from Edin Džeko ensuring victory in their first Süper Lig match of the season. On 13 August, Fenerbahçe defeated French side Lille 1–0 at home in the second leg of the UEFA Champions League third qualifying round, with an own goal by an opposing defender after 90 minutes, sending the match into extra time. The team drew 1–1 after extra time, bidding farewell to the UEFA Champions League. As a result, the team will continue in the league phase of the UEFA Europa League.

On 17 August, Fenerbahçe drew 2–2 away to Göztepe. The goals came from Edin Džeko's penalty and Youssef En-Nesyri's header. On 19 August, Miguel Crespo left the club to join İstanbul Başakşehir on a permanent transfer. A day later, Fenerbahçe announced that João Pedro's contract was terminated by mutual agreement.

On 25 August, Fenernahçe defeated Çaykur Rizespor 5–0 away with Fred, who scored a hat-trick for the first time in his career, Edin Džeko and an own goal scored by the opposition defence. On 27 August, Fenerbahçe agreed to sell Ferdi Kadıoğlu to Brighton & Hove Albion for €30 million + add-ons that could reach up to €5 million and a 10% sell-on clause. Three days later, a brace from Dušan Tadić and a goal from Edin Džeko saw Fener win 3–0 at Alanyaspor. On 31 August, Miha Zajc was loaned to French side Toulouse until the end of the season. On the same day, Sofyan Amrabat arrived at the club on loan from Fiorentina with an option to buy until the end of the season.

=== September ===
On 3 September, Fenerbahçe announced the permanent transfer of Luan Peres to Santos. On the same day, Fenerbahçe announced the permanent transfer of Rade Krunić to Red Star Belgrade. On 7 September, Omar Fayed was loaned to Belgian side Beerschot until the end of the season. On 9 September, Filip Kostić joined the team on loan from Juventus until the end of the season.

On 13 September, Emre Mor transferred to Eyüpspor on loan until the end of the season. On 15 September, Fener returned from the international break, defeated Kasımpaşa 2–0 away with Allan Saint-Maximin's debut goal for the club and Dušan Tadić's penalty. On 21 September, Fenerbahçe lost 3–1 to Galatasaray at home in the Intercontinental derby. The team's only goal came from Edin Džeko's penalty.

On 26 September, Fener defeated Belgian side Union Saint-Gilloise 2–1 in their first match in the new Europa League league phase format. The team scored their goals through Çağlar Söyüncü and own goals from the opponent's defense. Three days later, Fener beat Antalyaspor 2–0 away, with a goal from Dušan Tadić and own goal from the opponent's defense.

=== October ===
On 3 October, Fenerbahçe drew 1–1 away to Twente in the Europa League with a goal from Dušan Tadić. On 17 October, Fenerbahçe announced that the contract with Ryan Kent was terminated by mutual agreement. On 20 October, returning from another international break, Fener faced Samsunspor away from home, drawing 2–2 despite taking the lead with goals from Dušan Tadić and Allan Saint-Maximin.

Four days later, Fenerbahçe drew 1–1 at home to Manchester United in the Europa League with a goal from Youssef En-Nesyri. On 27 October, a home match against Bodrum ended in a 2–0 win for Fener, as Youssef En-Nesyri and Edin Džeko got on the scoresheet.

=== November ===
On 3 November, Fener beat Trabzonspor 3–2 at away with the help of goals from Fred, Edin Džeko and Sofyan Amrabat. On 7 November, Fener lost 3–1 away to AZ in the Europa League. Youssef En-Nesyri scoring the only goal for his team.

Three days later, Fenerbahçe defeated Sivasspor 4–0 at home with goals from Samet Akaydin, Sofyan Amrabat, Allan Saint-Maximin and a penalty from Dušan Tadić. After the international break, on 23 November, Fener defeated Kayserispor 6–2 away from home with brace from Oğuz Aydın, one each from Youssef En-Nesyri, Filip Kostić and Sebastian Szymański, and a penalty goal from Dušan Tadić. On 28 November, Fenerbahçe defeated Czech side Slavia Prague 2–1 away in the Europa League with goals from Edin Džeko and Youssef En-Nesyri. The team ended their opponent's 19-match unbeaten run and secured their first win in Europe after three matches.

=== December ===
On 2 December, Fener defeated Gaziantep 3–1 at home with goals from Oğuz Aydın, Rodrigo Becão and Edin Džeko. On 7 December, Fenerbahçe lost 1–0 away to Beşiktaş in a derby. The team, whose 26-game unbeaten streak in the league away from home came to an end, suffered a heavy blow on the way to the championship.

On 11 December, Fenerbahçe lost 2–0 at home to Athletic Bilbao in the Europa League. Four days later, Fener defeated İstanbul Başakşehir 3–1 at home with a brace from Youssef En-Nesyri and a goal from Edin Džeko. On 20 December, Fenerbahçe drew 1–1 away to Eyüpspor with a goal from Youssef En-Nesyri.

=== January ===
On 5 January, Fener defeated Hatayspor 2–1 at home with brace from Youssef En-Nesyri. Four days later, Fener defeated Kasımpaşa 3–0 away in the first match of the Turkish Cup group stage with the goals of Youssef En-Nesyri, Yusuf Akçiçek and Bartuğ Elmaz.

On 13 January, Fenerbahçe defeated Konyaspor 3–2 away with goals from Mert Müldür, Çağlar Söyüncü and Dušan Tadić. On 16 January, Fenerbahçe extended İrfan Kahveci contract for three years.

Three days later, Fener defeated Adana Demirspor 4–0 away with a brace from Youssef En-Nesyri and one goal each from Edin Džeko and Cenk Tosun. On 23 January, Fenerbahçe drew 0–0 with Lyon at home in the Europa League. On the same day, Diego Carlos signed from Aston Villa on a contract until 2028, Lincoln was loaned to English side Hull City until the end of the season, and Emir Ortakaya was loaned to Belgian side Beerschot AC until the end of the season.

On 24 January, Fenerbahçe announced that the contract with Samet Akaydin was terminated by mutual agreement. On 26 January, Fener defeated Göztepe 3–2 at home with brace from Youssef En-Nesyri a goal from Oğuz Aydın. On 28 January, Talisca signed from Al Nassr on a contract until 2026. On 30 January, Milan Škriniar arrived at the club on loan from Paris Saint-Germain until the end of the season.

On the same day, Fenerbahçe drew 2–2 away to Midtjylland in the Europa League with goals from Youssef En-Nesyri and Edin Džeko to advance to the knockout phase play-offs. On 31 January, Ognjen Mimović signed from Red Star Belgrade on a contract until 2029. On the same day, Bartuğ Elmaz was loaned to Slovenian side Maribor until the end of the season.

=== February ===
On 2 February, Fener defeated Çaykur Rizespor 3–2 at home with brace from Edin Džeko and a goal from Youssef En-Nesyri.

== Players ==
=== First team ===
N	Pos.	Nat.	Name	Age	EU	Since	App	Goals	Ends	Transfer fee	Notes
Goalkeepers
1	GK	(Turkey)	İrfan Can Eğribayat	26	Non-EU	2022	47	0	2027	€1.2M	
40	GK	(Croatia)	Dominik Livaković	30	EU	2023	72	0	2028	€6.6M	
54	GK	(Turkey)	Ertuğrul Çetin	22	Non-EU	2021	7	0	2027	Youth system	
Defenders
4	DF	(Turkey)	Çağlar Söyüncü	29	Non-EU	2024 (Winter)	56	4	2027	€8.5M	
6	DF	(Ghana)	Alexander Djiku	30	EU	2023	74	4	2026	Free	Second nationality: French
16	DF	(Turkey)	Mert Müldür	26	EU	2023	77	4	2027	Free	Second nationality: Austrian
21	DF	(Nigeria)	Bright Osayi-Samuel	27	Non-EU	2021 (Winter)	178	7	2025	Free	Second nationality: English
22	DF	(Turkey)	Levent Mercan	24	EU	2024	13	0	2028	Free	Second nationality: German
24	DF	(Netherlands)	Jayden Oosterwolde	24	EU	2023 (Winter)	62	2	2027	€6M	Other nationalities: Surinamese, Indonesian
33	DF	(Brazil)	Diego Carlos	32	EU	2025 (Winter)	5	0	2028	€10M	Second nationality: Spanish
37	DF	(Slovakia)	Milan Škriniar	30	EU	2025 (Winter)	23	3	2025	Loan	
50	DF	(Brazil)	Rodrigo Becão	29	Non-EU	2023	37	2	2028	€8.3M	
95	DF	(Turkey)	Yusuf Akçiçek	19	Non-EU	2023	25	2	2026	Youth system	
Midfielders
5	MF	(Turkey)	İsmail Yüksek	26	Non-EU	2020	110	2	2027	Free	
7	MF	(Turkey)	Burak Kapacak	25	Non-EU	2021	9	0	2026	€1.3M	
8	MF	(Turkey)	Mert Hakan Yandaş (Vice-captain)	30	Non-EU	2020	149	11	2026	Free	
10	MF	(Serbia)	Dušan Tadić (Vice-captain)	36	Non-EU	2023	109	29	2025	Free	
13	MF	(Brazil)	Fred	32	Non-EU	2023	80	8	2027	€9.7M	
17	MF	(Turkey)	İrfan Kahveci	29	Non-EU	2021 (Winter)	171	32	2028	€7M	
18	MF	(Serbia)	Filip Kostić	32	Non-EU	2024	35	2	2025	Loan	
34	MF	(Morocco)	Sofyan Amrabat	28	EU	2024	39	2	2025	Loan	Second nationality: Dutch
53	MF	(Poland)	Sebastian Szymański	26	EU	2023	108	20	2027	€9.7M	
94	MF	(Brazil)	Talisca	31	Non-EU	2025 (Winter)	23	12	2026	€5M	
Forwards
9	FW	(Bosnia and Herzegovina)	Edin Džeko (Captain)	39	EU	2023	99	46	2025	Free	Second nationality: Croatian
19	FW	(Morocco)	Youssef En-Nesyri	27	Non-EU	2024	41	26	2029	€19.5M	
23	FW	(Turkey)	Cenk Tosun	33	EU	2024	22	2	2026	Free	Second nationality: German
70	MF	(Turkey)	Oğuz Aydın	24	EU	2024	30	7	2028	€6.5M	Second nationality: Dutch
97	FW	(France)	Allan Saint-Maximin	28	EU	2024	31	4	2025	Loan	

- Last updated: 31 May 2025
- Source: Fenerbahce.org
- Ordered by squad number.

=== Reserve team ===
N	Pos.	Nat.	Name	Age	EU	Since	App	Goals	Ends	Transfer fee	Notes
42	MF	(Turkey)	Zeki Dursun	23	Non-EU	2023	0	0	2026	Youth system	
44	MF	(Turkey)	Yiğit Ekiz	20	Non-EU	2023	0	0	2026	Youth system	
57	GK	(Turkey)	Engin Can Bitegre	19	Non-EU	2024	0	0	2026	Youth system	
65	DF	(Turkey)	Muharrem Çizgili	20	Non-EU	2024	0	0	2028	Youth system	
80	MF	(Turkey)	Kaan Akyazı	21	Non-EU	2022	0	0	2026	Youth system	
81	MF	(Turkey)	Şükrü Toğrak	20	Non-EU	2023	0	0	2026	Youth system	
83	MF	(Turkey)	Yasir Boz	19	Non-EU	2023	0	0	2026	Youth system	
85	DF	(Turkey)	Baran Eligüzel	18	Non-EU	2023	0	0	2026	Youth system	

- Last updated: 31 January 2025
- Source: Fenerbahce.org
- Ordered by squad number.

== Transfers ==
=== In ===
No.	Pos.	Player	Transferred from	Fee	Date	Source
Summer
22	DF	(Turkey) Levent Mercan	(Turkey) Fatih Karagümrük	Free transfer	21 June 2024	
33	MF	(Bosnia and Herzegovina) Rade Krunić	(Italy) AC Milan	€3,500,000	30 June 2024	
—	FW	(Italy) João Pedro	(Brazil) Grêmio	Loan return	30 June 2024	
13	MF	(Portugal) Miguel Crespo	(Spain) Rayo Vallecano	Loan return	30 June 2024	
3	DF	(Turkey) Samet Akaydin	(Greece) Panathinaikos	Loan return	30 June 2024	
99	FW	(Turkey) Emre Mor	(Turkey) Fatih Karagümrük	Loan return	30 June 2024	
18	FW	(Turkey) Umut Nayir	(Turkey) Pendikspor	Loan return	30 June 2024	
28	MF	(Turkey) Bartuğ Elmaz	(Turkey) Sivasspor	Loan return	30 June 2024	
—	MF	(Turkey) Burak Kapacak	(Turkey) Sivasspor	Loan return	30 June 2024	
—	MF	(Turkey) Emre Demir	(Turkey) Ümraniyespor	Loan return	30 June 2024	
—	DF	(Turkey) Emir Ortakaya	(Turkey) Kocaelispor	Loan return	30 June 2024	
—	DF	(Egypt) Omar Fayed	(Serbia) Novi Pazar	Loan return	30 June 2024	
—	MF	(South Korea) Jo Jin-ho	(Serbia) Novi Pazar	Loan return	30 June 2024	
—	FW	(Turkey) Tiago Çukur	(Belgium) Beveren	Loan return	30 June 2024	
—	DF	(Turkey) Çağtay Kurukalıp	(Turkey) İskenderunspor	Loan return	30 June 2024	
54	GK	(Turkey) Ertuğrul Çetin	(Turkey) Gençlerbirliği	Loan return	30 June 2024	
4	DF	(Turkey) Çağlar Söyüncü	(Spain) Atlético Madrid	€8,500,000	1 July 2024	
23	FW	(Turkey) Cenk Tosun	(Turkey) Beşiktaş	Free transfer	16 July 2024	
70	FW	(Turkey) Oğuz Aydın	(Turkey) Alanyaspor	€6,000,000	16 July 2024	
97	FW	(France) Allan Saint-Maximin	(Saudi Arabia) Al-Ahli	Loan	17 July 2024	
19	FW	(Morocco) Youssef En-Nesyri	(Spain) Sevilla	€19,500,000	24 July 2024	
34	MF	(Morocco) Sofyan Amrabat	(Italy) Fiorentina	Loan	31 August 2024	
18	MF	(Serbia) Filip Kostić	(Italy) Juventus	Loan	9 September 2024	
Winter
33	DF	(Brazil) Diego Carlos	(England) Aston Villa	€10,000,000	23 January 2025	
94	MF	(Brazil) Talisca	(Saudi Arabia) Al Nassr	€5,000,000	28 January 2025	
37	DF	(Slovakia) Milan Škriniar	(France) Paris Saint-Germain	Loan	30 January 2025	
77	DF	(Serbia) Ognjen Mimović	(Serbia) Red Star Belgrade	Undisclosed	31 January 2025	

=== Out ===
No.	Pos.	Player	Transferred to	Fee	Date	Source
Summer
19	DF	(Italy) Leonardo Bonucci	Retired		30 June 2024	
15	FW	(Norway) Joshua King	(France) Toulouse	End of contract	30 June 2024	
91	FW	(Turkey) Serdar Dursun	(Turkey) Fatih Karagümrük	Loan return	30 June 2024	
23	FW	(Belgium) Michy Batshuayi	(Turkey) Galatasaray	End of contract	30 June 2024	
—	MF	(South Korea) Jo Jin-ho	(Serbia) Radnički Niš	Loan	2 July 2024	
4	DF	(Turkey) Serdar Aziz		Undisclosed	8 July 2024	
—	FW	(Turkey) Yusuf Kocatürk	(Turkey) Ümraniyespor	Undisclosed	11 July 2024	
—	MF	(Turkey) Emre Demir	(Turkey) Sakaryaspor	Loan	12 July 2024	
—	FW	(Turkey) Tiago Çukur	(Netherlands) Roda JC	Undisclosed	15 July 2024	
29	DF	(Turkey) Ahmet Aydın	(Turkey) 68 Aksarayspor	Loan	17 July 2024	
—	DF	(Turkey) Emir Ortakaya	(Belgium) Westerlo	Loan	24 July 2024	
18	FW	(Turkey) Umut Nayir	(Turkey) Konyaspor	Undisclosed	26 July 2024	
—	DF	(Turkey) Yiğit Efe Demir	(Turkey) Fatih Karagümrük	Loan	26 July 2024	
—	FW	(Turkey) Melih Bostan	(Turkey) Konyaspor	Undisclosed	1 August 2024	
—	DF	(Turkey) Çağtay Kurukalıp	(Turkey) Fatih Karagümrük	Free transfer	9 August 2024	
—	FW	(North Macedonia) Çağrı Fedai	(Turkey) Gençlerbirliği	Loan	16 August 2024	
13	MF	(Portugal) Miguel Crespo	(Turkey) İstanbul Başakşehir	Undisclosed	19 August 2024	
—	MF	(Turkey) Samet Sargın	(Turkey) Balıkesirspor	Loan	20 August 2024	
—	FW	(Italy) João Pedro	(England) Hull City	Mutual agreement	20 August 2024	
7	DF	(Turkey) Ferdi Kadıoğlu	(England) Brighton & Hove Albion	€30,000,000 + Add-ons	27 August 2024	
26	MF	(Slovenia) Miha Zajc	(France) Toulouse	Loan	31 August 2024	
14	DF	(Brazil) Luan Peres	(Brazil) Santos	Free transfer	3 September 2024	
33	MF	(Bosnia and Herzegovina) Rade Krunić	(Serbia) Red Star Belgrade	Free transfer	3 September 2024	
90	GK	(Turkey) Furkan Onur Akyüz	(Turkey) Fatih Karagümrük	Loan	6 September 2024	
—	DF	(Egypt) Omar Fayed	(Belgium) Beerschot	Loan	7 September 2024	
99	FW	(Turkey) Emre Mor	(Turkey) Eyüpspor	Loan	13 September 2024	
11	MF	(England) Ryan Kent		Mutual agreement	17 October 2024	
Winter
—	MF	(Brazil) Lincoln	(England) Hull City	Loan	23 January 2025	
—	DF	(Turkey) Emir Ortakaya	(Belgium) Beerschot AC	Loan	23 January 2025	
3	DF	(Turkey) Samet Akaydin	(Turkey) Çaykur Rizespor	Mutual agreement	24 January 2025	
28	MF	(Turkey) Bartuğ Elmaz	(Slovenia) Maribor	Loan	31 January 2025	
77	DF	(Serbia) Ognjen Mimović	(Russia) Zenit Saint Petersburg	Loan	12 February 2025	
20	FW	(Turkey) Cengiz Ünder	(United States) Los Angeles FC	Loan	20 February 2025	

=== Transfer summary ===
Undisclosed fees are not included in the transfer totals.

Expenditure

Summer: ▼€37,500,000

Winter: ▼€15,000,000

Total: ▼€52,500,000

Income

Summer: ▲€30,000,000

Winter: €0,000,000

Total: ▲€30,000,000

Net totals

Summer: ▼€7,500,000

Winter: ▼€15,000,000

Total: ▼€22,500,000

=== Contract renewals ===
No.	Pos.	Nat.	Player	Age	Status	Contract length	Contract ends	Source
8	MF	(Turkey)	Mert Hakan Yandaş	29	Extended	Two-year	30 June 2026	
54	GK	(Turkey)	Ertuğrul Çetin	21	Extended	Two-year	30 June 2027	
99	FW	(Turkey)	Emre Mor	27	Extended	One-year	30 June 2026	
17	MF	(Turkey)	İrfan Kahveci	29	Extended	Three-year	30 June 2028	

== Pre-season and friendlies ==
Win Draw Loss Fixtures

=== Pre-season ===
29 June 2024 Friendly	Fenerbahçe (Turkey)	2–1	(Romania) Petrolul Ploiești	Düzce, Turkey
10:30 TRT (UTC+3)	Džeko 41'; Zajc 57'	Report	Bratu 35'	Stadium: Düzce Topuk Yaylası Facilities; Attendance: 50

6 July 2024 Friendly	Admira Wacker (Austria)	1–1	(Turkey) Fenerbahçe	Maria Enzersdorf, Austria
19:00 CEST (UTC+2)	Young 7'	Report	Džeko 22' (pen.)	Stadium: Motion invest Arena; Attendance: 7,000; Referee: Jakob Semler (Austria)

10 July 2024 Friendly	Fenerbahçe (Turkey)	0–1	(Croatia) Hajduk Split	Graz, Austria
19:00 CEST (UTC+2)		Report	Durdov 85'	Stadium: Liebenauer Stadium; Attendance: 5,000; Referee: Christian-Petru Ciochirca (Austria)

13 July 2024 Friendly	Strasbourg (France)	0–4	(Turkey) Fenerbahçe	Graz, Austria
18:30 CEST (UTC+2)		Report	Szymański 5'; Tadić 33'; Kent 37'; Džeko 45'	Stadium: Liebenauer Stadium; Attendance: 2,000; Referee: Alexander Harkam (Austria)

18 July 2024 Friendly	Fenerbahçe (Turkey)	5–1	(England) Hull City	Istanbul, Turkey
20:30 TRT (UTC+3)	Džeko 38', 46'; Fred 44'; Szymański 52'; Yandaş 67'	Report	Hall 74'	Stadium: Şükrü Saracoğlu Stadium; Attendance: 40,000; Referee: Volkan Bayarslan (Turkey)

=== Mid-season ===
15 November 2024 Friendly	Fenerbahçe (Turkey)	2–1	(Russia) Zenit Saint Petersburg	Istanbul, Turkey
20:00 TRT (UTC+3)	Tosun 20'; Mercan 63'	Report	Yerokhin 35'	Stadium: Şükrü Saracoğlu Stadium; Attendance: 47,430; Referee: Ozan Ergün (Turkey)

== Competitions ==
=== Overall record ===
Competition	First match	Last match	Starting round	Final position	Record							
Competition	First match	Last match	Starting round	Final position	Pld	W	D	L	GF	GA	GD	Win %
Süper Lig	10 August 2024	31 May 2025	Matchday 1	2nd	36	26	6	4	90	39	+51	72.22
Turkish Cup	9 January 2025	2 April 2025	Group stage	Quarter-finals	4	3	0	1	13	3	+10	75.00
UEFA Champions League	23 July 2024	13 August 2024	Second qualifying round	Third qualifying round	4	2	1	1	8	7	+1	50.00
UEFA Europa League	26 September 2024	13 March 2025	League phase	Round of 16	12	4	5	3	17	16	+1	33.33
Total					56	35	12	9	128	65	+63	62.50

Source: Soccerway

=== Süper Lig ===
==== League table ====
Pos	Team	Pld	W	D	L	GF	GA	GD	Pts	Qualification or relegation
1	Galatasaray (C)	36	30	5	1	91	31	+60	95	Qualification for the Champions League league phase
2	Fenerbahçe	36	26	6	4	90	39	+51	84	Qualification for the Champions League third qualifying round
3	Samsunspor	36	19	7	10	55	41	+14	64	Qualification for the Europa League play-off round (Note: The 2024–25 Turkish Cup winners qualified for the Europa League play-off round. Since the cup winners (Galatasaray) qualified based on league position, the Europa League play-off round spot was passed to the third-placed team, the Europa League second round spot was passed to the fourth-placed team, and the Conference League spot was passed to the fifth-placed team.)
4	Beşiktaş	36	17	11	8	59	36	+23	62	Qualification for the Europa League second qualifying round
5	Başakşehir	36	16	6	14	60	56	+4	54	Qualification for the Conference League second qualifying round

Source: Süper Lig
Rules for classification: 1) Points; 2) Head-to-head points; 3) Head-to-head goal difference; 4) Head-to-head goals scored; 5) Goal difference; 6) Goals scored; 7) Play-off.
(Note: Head-to-head record is used only after all the matches between the teams in question have been played)
(C) Champions

==== Results summary ====
Overall								Home						Away					
Pld	W	D	L	GF	GA	GD	Pts	W	D	L	GF	GA	GD	W	D	L	GF	GA	GD
36	26	6	4	90	39	+51	84	14	2	2	42	18	+24	12	4	2	48	21	+27

Source: TFF.org

Pld = Matches played; W = Matches won; D = Matches drawn; L = Matches lost; GF = Goals for; GA = Goals against; GD = Goal difference; Pts = Points

==== Results by round ====
Round	1	2	3	4	5	6	7	8	9	10	11	12	13	14	15	16	17	18	19	20	21	22	23	24	25	26	27	28	29	30	31	32	33	34	35	36	37	38
Ground	H	A	A	H	A	H	A	B	A	H	A	H	A	H	A	H	A	H	A	A	H	H	A	H	A	H	B	H	A	H	A	H	A	H	A	H	A	H
Result	W	D	W	W	W	L	W	B	D	W	W	W	W	W	L	W	D	W	W	W	W	W	W	W	D	W	B	D	W	W	W	D	W	L	W	W	L	W
Position	4	6	2	2	2	2	2	4	4	3	3	2	2	2	2	2	2	2	2	2	2	2	2	2	2	2	2	2	2	2	2	2	2	2	2	2	2	2

Source: TFF.org
A = Away; H = Home; B = Bye; W = Win; D = Draw; L = Loss

==== Score overview ====
Win Draw Loss

Opposition	Home score	Away score	Aggregate score	Double
Adana Demirspor	1–0	4–0	5–0	Yes
Alanyaspor	3–0	2–0	5–0	Yes
Antalyaspor	3–0	2–0	5–0	Yes
Beşiktaş	0–1	1–0	0–2	No
Bodrum	2–0	4–2	6–2	Yes
Çaykur Rizespor	3–2	5–0	8–2	Yes
Eyüpspor	2–1	1–1	3–2	No
Galatasaray	1–3	0–0	1–3	No
Gaziantep	3–1	1–3	6–2	Yes
Göztepe	3–2	2–2	5–4	No
Hatayspor	2–1	4–2	4–5	No
İstanbul Başakşehir	3–1	1–4	7–2	Yes
Kasımpaşa	3–1	2–0	5–1	Yes
Kayserispor	3–3	2–6	9–5	No
Konyaspor	2–1	2–3	5–3	Yes
Samsunspor	0–0	2–2	2–2	No
Sivasspor	4–0	1–3	7–1	Yes
Trabzonspor	4–1	2–3	7–3	Yes

==== Matches ====
The league fixtures were announced on 11 July 2024.

10 August 2024 1	Fenerbahçe	1–0	Adana Demirspor	Kadıköy
21:45 TRT (UTC+3)	Džeko 34'; Oosterwolde (yellow card) 27'; Elmaz (yellow card) 90'	Report	Maestro (yellow card) 16'; Mohammadi (yellow card) 39'	Stadium: Şükrü Saracoğlu Stadium; Attendance: 37,932; Referee: Atilla Karaoğlan

17 August 2024 2	Göztepe	2–2	Fenerbahçe	Göztepe
21:45 TRT (UTC+3)	Günter 68', (yellow card) 90+2'; Bokele (yellow card) 86'; Rômulo 90+5'	Report	Džeko 45+3', (yellow card) 87'; En-Nesyri 45+7'; Saint-Maximin (yellow card) 70'	Stadium: Gürsel Aksel Stadium; Attendance: 17,636; Referee: Kadir Sağlam

25 August 2024 3	Çaykur Rizespor	0–5	Fenerbahçe	Rize
21:45 TRT (UTC+3)	Aliqulov (yellow card) 29'; David (yellow card) 32'; Şahin (yellow card) 50'	Report	Fred (yellow card) 4', (goal) 15', 60', 64'; Söyüncü (yellow card) 45+2'; Džeko 53'; Aliqulov 66' (o.g.)	Stadium: Rize City Stadium; Attendance: 10,488; Referee: Turgut Doman

30 August 2024 4	Fenerbahçe	3–0	Alanyaspor	Kadıköy
21:00 TRT (UTC+3)	Tadić 43', 65'; Oosterwolde (yellow card) 56'; Džeko 67'	Report	Richard (yellow card) 46'; Dursun (yellow card) 55'; Makouta (yellow card) 59'; Hadergjonaj (yellow card) 80'	Stadium: Şükrü Saracoğlu Stadium; Attendance: 38,778; Referee: Mehmet Türkmen

15 September 2024 5	Kasımpaşa	0–2	Fenerbahçe	Kasımpaşa
17:00 TRT (UTC+3)	Fall (yellow card) 8'; Opoku (yellow card) 38'; Winck (yellow card) 45+1'	Report	Saint-Maximin 22'; Tadić 39' (pen.); Oosterwolde (yellow card) 49'	Stadium: Recep Tayyip Erdoğan Stadium; Attendance: 5,886; Referee: Halil Umut Meler

21 September 2024 6	Fenerbahçe	1–3	Galatasaray	Kadıköy
20:00 TRT (UTC+3)	Yandaş (yellow card) 25'; Džeko 63' (pen.); Fred (yellow card) 71'; En-Nesyri (yellow card) 75'	Report	Livaković 20' (o.g.); Mertens 28'; Akgün (yellow card) 30'; Sánchez (yellow card) 36'; Ayhan (yellow card) 43'; Sara 59'; Bardakcı (yellow card) 61'; Yılmaz (yellow card) 65'; Jakobs (yellow card) 71'	Stadium: Şükrü Saracoğlu Stadium; Attendance: 44,283; Referee: Atilla Karaoğlan

29 September 2024 7	Antalyaspor	0–2	Fenerbahçe	Antalya
19:00 TRT (UTC+3)	Thalisson (yellow card) 45+4'	Report	Djiku (yellow card) 32'; Tadić 63'; Thalisson 81' (o.g.)	Stadium: Antalya Stadium; Attendance: 13,819; Referee: Cihan Aydın

8	Bye

20 October 2024 9	Samsunspor	2–2	Fenerbahçe	Samsun
19:00 TRT (UTC+3)	Šatka (yellow card) 13'; Ntcham (yellow card) 14'; Holse 48'; Kılınç (yellow card) 55'; Bola (yellow card) 57'; Aït Bennasser (yellow card) 76'; Aydoğdu 88'; Mouandilmadji (yellow card) 90+5'	Report	Kostić (yellow card) 9'; Tadić 24'; Fred (yellow card) 40'; Becão (yellow card) 52'; Saint-Maximin 62'; Kahveci (yellow card) 89'; Djiku (yellow card) 90+5'	Stadium: Samsun 19 Mayıs Stadium; Attendance: 33,021; Referee: Muhammet Ali Metoğlu

27 October 2024 10	Fenerbahçe	2–0	Bodrum	Kadıköy
19:00 TRT (UTC+3)	En-Nesyri 15'; Amrabat (yellow card) 24'; Dzeko 55'; Szymański (yellow card) 80'	Report	Yalçın (yellow card) 30'	Stadium: Şükrü Saracoğlu Stadium; Attendance: 41,346; Referee: Mehmet Türkmen

3 November 2024 11	Trabzonspor	2–3	Fenerbahçe	Trabzon
19:00 TRT (UTC+3)	Tufan (yellow card) 30'; Denswil (yellow card) 45+3'; Banza 59', 67' (pen.), (yellow card) 90+15'; Elmalı (yellow card) 62'; Çakır (yellow card) 75'; Destan (yellow card) 90+10'; Bozok (yellow card) 90+10'	Report	Fred 42'; Osayi-Samuel (yellow card) 59'; Džeko 75'; Amrabat (yellow card) 90+3', (goal) 90+12'	Stadium: Şenol Güneş Sports Complex; Attendance: 36,347; Referee: Oğuzhan Çakır

10 November 2024 12	Fenerbahçe	4–0	Sivasspor	Kadıköy
19:00 TRT (UTC+3)	Akaydin 24', (yellow card) 84'; Tadić 54' (pen.); Amrabat 82'; Saint-Maximin 90+4'	Report	Koita (yellow card) 9'; Baldé (yellow card) 15'; Charisis (yellow card) 43'; Nikolić (yellow card) 53'; Poungouras (yellow card) 59'; Sonko Sundberg (yellow card) 80'	Stadium: Şükrü Saracoğlu Stadium; Attendance: 34,668; Referee: Kadir Sağlam

23 November 2024 13	Kayserispor	2–6	Fenerbahçe	Kayseri
16:00 TRT (UTC+3)	Civelek (yellow card) 9'; Gezek (yellow card) 12'; Djiku 43' (o.g.); Kolovetsios 56'; Nazon (yellow card) 74'; Cardoso (yellow card) 84'	Report	Tadić 7' (pen.); Aydın 15', 26'; Djiku (yellow card) 19'; En-Nesyri 63'; Yandaş (yellow card) 64'; Akaydin (yellow card) 74'; Kostić 85'; Szymański 88'	Stadium: Kadir Has Stadium; Attendance: 14,619; Referee: Direnç Tonusluoğlu

2 December 2024 14	Fenerbahçe	3–1	Gaziantep	Kadıköy
20:00 TRT (UTC+3)	Aydın 3'; Akaydin (yellow card) 72'; Becão 78'; Müldür (yellow card) 87'; Džeko 89'; Szymański (yellow card) 90+1'; Yüksek (yellow card) 90+3'	Report	Kodro (yellow card) 32'; Okereke 41'; Viana (yellow card) 87'	Stadium: Şükrü Saracoğlu Stadium; Attendance: 31,777; Referee: Alper Akarsu

7 December 2024 15	Beşiktaş	1–0	Fenerbahçe	Beşiktaş
19:00 TRT (UTC+3)	Fernandes (yellow card) 32' (yellow-red card) 90+6'; Oxlade-Chamberlain 73'	Report	Djiku (yellow card) 89'	Stadium: Beşiktaş Stadium; Attendance: 38,321; Referee: Mehmet Türkmen

15 December 2024 16	Fenerbahçe	3–1	İstanbul Başakşehir	Kadıköy
19:00 TRT (UTC+3)	Džeko 41'; Amrabat (yellow card) 45'; En-Nesyri 74', 90'	Report	Özdemir (yellow card) 40'; Opoku (yellow card) 45'; Ba (red card) 45+1'; Türüç (yellow card) 45+4'; Piątek 59'; Crespo (yellow card) 62'; Dilmen (yellow card) 66'	Stadium: Şükrü Saracoğlu Stadium; Attendance: 27,882; Referee: Ozan Ergün

20 December 2024 17	Eyüpspor	1–1	Fenerbahçe	Kasımpaşa
20:00 TRT (UTC+3)	Akbaba (yellow card) 13'; Kutucu 26', (yellow card) 44'; Yalçın (yellow card) 45+4'; Erkin (yellow card) 45+5'; Toköz (yellow card) 73'; Thiam (yellow card) 88'	Report	En-Nesyri 45+4', (yellow card) 90+8'; Söyüncü (yellow card) 53'; Saint-Maximin (yellow card) 72'; Ünder (yellow card) 90+8'	Stadium: Recep Tayyip Erdoğan Stadium; Attendance: 6,788; Referee: Emre Kargın

5 January 2025 18	Fenerbahçe	2–1	Hatayspor	Kadıköy
19:00 TRT (UTC+3)	En-Nesyri 16', 45+5'; Amrabat (yellow card) 55'; Szymański (yellow card) 77'; Fred (yellow card) 85'; Džeko (penalty missed) 90+6'	Report	Rui Pedro (yellow card) 13'; Boutobba 33'; Aboubakar (yellow card) 85'; Matur (yellow card) 90+5'; Kardeşler (yellow card) 90+8'	Stadium: Şükrü Saracoğlu Stadium; Attendance: 26,744; Referee: Oğuzhan Çakır

13 January 2025 19	Konyaspor	2–3	Fenerbahçe	Konya
20:00 TRT (UTC+3)	Pedrinho 1'; Ülgün (yellow card) 29'; Kramer 44'; Bostan (yellow card) 90+4'	Report	Tadić (yellow card) 10', (goal) 61'; Müldür 16'; Söyüncü 25'; Kostić (yellow card) 63'	Stadium: Konya Metropolitan Municipality Stadium; Attendance: 25,822; Referee: Direnç Tonusluoğlu

19 January 2025 20	Adana Demirspor	0–4	Fenerbahçe	Adana
19:00 TRT (UTC+3)	Çelik (yellow card) 34'; Barası (red card) 56'	Report	Djiku (yellow card) 31'; En-Nesyri 69', 71'; Džeko 74'; Tosun 90+1'	Stadium: New Adana Stadium; Attendance: 14,156; Referee: Halil Umut Meler

26 January 2025 21	Fenerbahçe	3–2	Göztepe	Kadıköy
19:00 TRT (UTC+3)	En-Nesyri (yellow card) 45+4', (goal) 46', 53'; Aydın 55', (yellow card) 90'; Kostić (yellow card) 69'	Report	Miroshi (yellow card) 22', (goal) 82'; Juan 25'; Dennis (yellow card) 50'	Stadium: Şükrü Saracoğlu Stadium; Attendance: 39,639; Referee: Atilla Karaoğlan

2 February 2025 22	Fenerbahçe	3–2	Çaykur Rizespor	Kadıköy
19:00 TRT (UTC+3)	Yandaş (yellow card) 33'; Amrabat (yellow card) 45+3'; Džeko 45+8' (pen.), 79'; Yüksek (yellow card) 84'; Kahveci (yellow card) 84'; En-Nesyri 89', (yellow card) 90'	Report	Sowe 7', 13', (yellow card) 72'; Olawoyin (yellow card) 21' (yellow-red card) 45+7'; Mocsi (yellow card) 37'; Ghezzal (yellow card) 77' (yellow-red card) 78'	Stadium: Şükrü Saracoğlu Stadium; Attendance: 35,983; Referee: Burak Pakkan

9 February 2025 23	Alanyaspor	0–2	Fenerbahçe	Alanya
16:00 TRT (UTC+3)	Aliti (yellow card) 18'; Özdemir (yellow card) 48'; Córdova (yellow card) 50'; Richard (yellow card) 90+3'	Report	Szymański 22', (yellow card) 89'; Škriniar (yellow card) 35'; Talisca 42'; Amrabat (yellow card) 59'; Tadić (yellow card) 87'	Stadium: Alanya Oba Stadium; Attendance: 7,996; Referee: Cihan Aydın

16 February 2025 24	Fenerbahçe	3–1	Kasımpaşa	Kadıköy
19:00 TRT (UTC+3)	En-Nesyri 21', 71'; Talisca (yellow card) 31'; Aydın 52'	Report	Winck (yellow card) 33'; Fall 62'	Stadium: Şükrü Saracoğlu Stadium; Attendance: 38,335; Referee: Ali Şansalan

24 February 2025 25	Galatasaray	0–0	Fenerbahçe	Sarıyer
20:00 TRT (UTC+3)	Osimhen (yellow card) 38'; Yılmaz (yellow card) 85'; Sallai (yellow card) 88'; Sánchez (yellow card) 90+1'; Akgün (yellow card) 90+2'	Report	Söyüncü (yellow card) 48'; Fred (yellow card) 90+2'	Stadium: Rams Park; Attendance: 51,372; Referee: Slavko Vinčić (Slovenia)

2 March 2025 26	Fenerbahçe	3–0	Antalyaspor	Kadıköy
20:30 TRT (UTC+3)	Müldür 9'; Tadić 26'; En-Nesyri 30'	Report		Stadium: Şükrü Saracoğlu Stadium; Attendance: 28,782; Referee: Mehmet Türkmen

27	Bye

16 March 2025 28	Fenerbahçe	0–0	Samsunspor	Kadıköy
20:30 TRT (UTC+3)	Kahveci (yellow card) 90+9'	Report	Mouandilmadji (yellow card) 4' (yellow-red card) 75'; Yüksel (yellow card) 12'; Yavru (yellow card) 75'; Kocuk (yellow card) 79'; Bola (yellow card) 90+9'	Stadium: Şükrü Saracoğlu Stadium; Attendance: 36,110; Referee: Cihan Aydın

28 March 2025 29	Bodrum	2–4	Fenerbahçe	Bodrum
20:30 TRT (UTC+3)	Mohammed (yellow card) 4'; Pușcaș 31' (pen.); Okita (yellow card) 56'; Fredy 85'	Report	Škriniar 5'; Aydın 32'; Szymański 36'; Talisca 45' (pen.); Saint-Maximin (yellow card) 90'	Stadium: Bodrum District Stadium; Attendance: 3,856; Referee: Atilla Karaoğlan

6 April 2025 30	Fenerbahçe	4–1	Trabzonspor	Kadıköy
19:00 TRT (UTC+3)	Djiku (yellow card) 7'; Amrabat (yellow card) 18'; Talisca 51' (pen.), 64', 77'; Škriniar 60'	Report	Malheiro (yellow card) 13'; Drăguș 45+4'; Lundstram (yellow card) 60'; Savić (yellow card) 88'	Stadium: Şükrü Saracoğlu Stadium; Attendance: 38,216; Referee: Mehmet Türkmen

13 April 2025 31	Sivasspor	1–3	Fenerbahçe	Sivas
19:00 TRT (UTC+3)	Charisis (yellow card) 27'; Paluli (yellow card) 45'; Bekiroğlu 57'; Radaković (red card) 85'	Report	Talisca 42'; Tadić 47', 90'; Müldür (yellow card) 55'; Osayi-Samuel (yellow card) 75'	Stadium: New Sivas 4 Eylül Stadium; Attendance: 15,559; Referee: Yasin Kol

20 April 2025 32	Fenerbahçe	3–3	Kayserispor	Kadıköy
19:00 TRT (UTC+3)	Talisca 36', 79' (pen.); Fred (yellow card) 56'; Saint-Maximin 64'	Report	Civelek 7', (yellow card) 82'; Livaković 48' (o.g.); Karimi (yellow card) 56'; Sarıarslan 90+4'	Stadium: Şükrü Saracoğlu Stadium; Attendance: 38,491; Referee: Oguzhan Çakir

26 April 2025 33	Gaziantep	1–3	Fenerbahçe	Gaziantep
11:00 TRT (UTC+3)	Boateng (yellow card) 10'; Maxim 14', (yellow card) 40'; Husić (yellow card) 20'; Bruno Viana (yellow card) 65'	Report	Yüksek (yellow card) 5'; Kostić (yellow card) 16'; Talisca 68' (pen.); Džeko 69'; Fred 72'	Stadium: Gaziantep Stadium; Attendance: 8,892; Referee: Direnç Tonusluoglu

4 May 2025 34	Fenerbahçe	0–1	Beşiktaş	Kadıköy
19:00 TRT (UTC+3)	Söyüncü (yellow card) 37'; Škriniar (yellow card) 45+4'; Djiku (yellow card) 88'	Report	Gedson (penalty missed) 36', 44'; Hekimoğlu (yellow card) 45+2'; Uduokhai (yellow card) 72'; Günok (yellow card) 79'; Masuaku (yellow card) 90+3'	Stadium: Şükrü Saracoğlu Stadium; Referee: Yasin Kol

9 May 2025 35	İstanbul Başakşehir	1–4	Fenerbahçe	Başakşehir
20:00 TRT (UTC+3)	Şahiner (yellow card) 30'; Beyaz 90+1'	Report	Amrabat (yellow card) 18'; Carlos (yellow card) 24'; Talisca (yellow card) 28'; Müldür 44'; Škriniar 60'; Yüksek (yellow card) 79'; En-Nesyri 86'; Aydın 90+3'	Stadium: Başakşehir Fatih Terim Stadium; Referee: Burak Pakkan

18 May 2025 36	Fenerbahçe	2–1	Eyüpspor	Kadıköy
19:00 TRT (UTC+3)	En-Nesyri 32'; Fred (yellow card) 53'; Džeko 83'; Kostić (yellow card) 90+6'	Report	Mor (yellow card) 41'; Meraş 90+3'	Stadium: Şükrü Saracoğlu Stadium

26 May 2025 37	Hatayspor	4–2	Fenerbahçe	Mersin
20:00 TRT (UTC+3)	Çetin 44' (o.g.); Boutobba 53'; Sağlam 63' (pen.); Okoronkwo 66'; Çörekçi (yellow card) 69'	Report	En-Nesyri 27'; Müldür (red card) 38'; Amrabat (yellow card) 69'; Yüksek (yellow card) 82'; Kahveci 90+4'	Stadium: Mersin Stadium; Referee: Yiğit Arslan

31 May 2025 38	Fenerbahçe	2–1	Konyaspor	Kadıköy
16:00 TRT (UTC+3)	Talisca (yellow card) 29'; Kahveci 75', (yellow card) 77'; En-Nesyri 82'; Yüksek (yellow card) 84'; Söyüncü (yellow card) 90+3'	Report	Bostan 4'	Stadium: Şükrü Saracoğlu Stadium; Referee: Oğuzhan Çakır

=== Turkish Cup ===
==== Group stage ====
The draw for the group stage was held on 20 December 2024.

Pos	Team	Pld	W	D	L	GF	GA	GD	Pts	FEN	GÖZ	İST	GAZ	ERZ	KAS
1	Fenerbahçe	3	3	0	0	12	1	+11	9					5–0	
2	Göztepe	3	3	0	0	7	0	+7	9				1–0		
3	İstanbulspor	3	2	0	1	5	4	+1	6						2–0
4	Gaziantep	3	1	0	2	5	5	0	3	1–4		4–0			
5	Erzurumspor	3	0	0	3	0	9	−9	0		0–1	0–3			
6	Kasımpaşa	3	0	0	3	0	10	−10	0	0–3	0–5				

Legend: Blue = home team win; Yellow = draw; Red = away team win.

9 January 2025 1	Kasımpaşa	0–3	Fenerbahçe	Kasımpaşa
20:30 TRT (UTC+3)	Yavrucu (yellow card) 26'	Report	En-Nesyri 2'; Akçiçek 27'; Elmaz 45+1'	Stadium: Recep Tayyip Erdoğan Stadium; Referee: Kadir Sağlam

5 February 2025 2	Fenerbahçe	5–0	Erzurumspor	Kadıköy
20:30 TRT (UTC+3)	Talisca 33'; Tosun 50' (pen.); Djiku (yellow card) 52'; Akçiçek (yellow card) 71'; Yandaş 78'; En-Nesyri 81', 89'	Report		Stadium: Şükrü Saracoğlu Stadium; Referee: Adnan Deniz Kayatepe

27 February 2025 3	Gaziantep	1–4	Fenerbahçe	Gaziantep
16:00 TRT (UTC+3)	Okereke (yellow card) 29'; Özçiçek (yellow card) 34'; Artan (yellow card) 56'; Husić 75'	Report	Talisca 16', 27'; En-Nesyri 23'; Müldür (yellow card) 25'; Kostić 83'	Stadium: Gaziantep Stadium; Referee: Yasin Kol

==== Quarter-finals ====
The draw for the quarter-finals was held on 6 March 2025.

2 April 2025 Single leg	Fenerbahçe	1–2	Galatasaray	Kadıköy
20:45 TRT (UTC+3)	Szymański 45+1', (yellow card) 90+13'; Söyüncü (yellow card) 46'; Džeko (yellow card) 81'; Kahveci (yellow card) 85'; Škriniar (yellow card) 85'; Yandaş (red card) 90+2'; Fred (red card) 90+17'	Report	Osimhen 10', 27' (pen.), (yellow card) 85'; Sallai (yellow card) 80'; Elmalı (yellow card) 84'; Yılmaz (red card) 90+2'; Demirbay (red card) 90+2'; Frankowski (yellow card) 90+14'	Stadium: Şükrü Saracoğlu Stadium; Referee: Cihan Aydın

=== UEFA Champions League ===
==== Second qualifying round ====
The draw for the second qualifying round was held on 19 June 2024.

23 July 2024 First leg	Lugano (Switzerland)	3–4	(Turkey) Fenerbahçe	Thun, Switzerland
20:30 CEST (UTC+2)	El Wafi 4', (yellow card) 29'; Papadopoulos (yellow card) 59'; Bislimi 64'; Bottani (yellow card) 69'; Grgić (yellow card) 71'; Zanotti (yellow card) 77'; Valenzuela 90+4'	Report	Söyüncü (yellow card) 18'; Džeko 45+1' (pen.), 46', 67'; Tadić (yellow card) 45+3'; Oosterwolde (yellow card) 70'; Kadıoğlu 74'; Tosun (yellow card) 90+5'	Stadium: Stockhorn Arena (Note: Lugano played their home match at the Stockhorn Arena, in Thun, instead of their regular stadium, the Cornaredo Stadium, in Lugano, due to renovation works.); Attendance: 6,009; Referee: Tiago Martins (Portugal)

30 July 2024 Second leg	Fenerbahçe (Turkey)	2–1 (6–4 agg.)	(Switzerland) Lugano	Istanbul, Turkey
20:00 TRT (UTC+3)	Džeko 59', (yellow card) 86'; Szymański 90+3'	Report	Mahmoud 7', (yellow card) 57'; Doumbia (yellow card) 55'; Aliseda (yellow card) 57'; Zanotti (yellow card) 78'	Stadium: Şükrü Saracoğlu Stadium; Attendance: 37,281; Referee: Robert Jones (England)

==== Third qualifying round ====
The draw for the third qualifying round was held on 22 July 2024.

6 August 2024 First leg	Lille (France)	2–1	(Turkey) Fenerbahçe	Valenciennes, France
20:30 CEST (UTC+2)	Santos 12', (yellow card) 45+1'; Zhegrova 90+1'	Report	Džeko (yellow card) 9'; Kadıoğlu (yellow card) 10'; Kahveci 80'	Stadium: Stade du Hainaut (Note: Lille played their home match at the Stade du Hainaut, in Valenciennes, instead of their regular stadium, the Stade Pierre-Mauroy, in Villeneuve-d'Ascq, as it was being used for the 2024 Summer Olympics.); Attendance: 12,908; Referee: István Kovács (Romania)

13 August 2024 Second leg	Fenerbahçe (Turkey)	1–1 (a.e.t.) (2–3 agg.)	(France) Lille	Istanbul, Turkey
20:00 TRT (UTC+3)	Müldür (yellow card) 8'; Djiku (yellow card) 65'; Söyüncü (yellow card) 68'; Diakité 90+1' (o.g.); Oosterwolde (yellow card) 120+3'	Report	Alexsandro (yellow card) 35'; Zhegrova (yellow card) 80'; Mandi (red card) 109'; David 118' (pen.)	Stadium: Şükrü Saracoğlu Stadium; Attendance: 40,474; Referee: José María Sánchez Martínez (Spain)

=== UEFA Europa League ===
==== League phase ====
The draw for the league phase was held on 30 August 2024.

Pos	Team	Pld	W	D	L	GF	GA	GD	Pts	Qualification
22	(Hellenic Football Federation) PAOK	8	3	1	4	12	10	+2	10	Advance to knockout phase play-offs (unseeded)
23	(Royal Dutch Football Association) Twente	8	2	4	2	8	9	−1	10	Advance to knockout phase play-offs (unseeded)
24	(Turkish Football Federation) Fenerbahçe	8	2	4	2	9	11	−2	10	Advance to knockout phase play-offs (unseeded)
25	(Portuguese Football Federation) Braga	8	3	1	4	9	12	−3	10	
26	(Swedish Football Association) IF Elfsborg	8	3	1	4	9	14	−5	10	

Source: UEFA
Rules for classification: League phase tiebreakers

Overall								Home						Away					
Pld	W	D	L	GF	GA	GD	Pts	W	D	L	GF	GA	GD	W	D	L	GF	GA	GD
8	2	4	2	9	11	−2	10	1	2	1	3	4	−1	1	2	1	6	7	−1

Last updated: 30 January 2025.
Source: UEFA

Round	1	2	3	4	5	6	7	8
Ground	H	A	H	A	A	H	H	A
Result	W	D	D	L	W	L	D	D
Position	11	13	14	21	15	21	23	24

Updated to match(es) played on 30 January 2025. Source: UEFA
A = Away; H = Home; W = Win; D = Draw; L = Loss

26 September 2024 1	Fenerbahçe (Turkey)	2–1	(Belgium) Union Saint-Gilloise	Istanbul, Turkey
19:45 TRT (UTC+3)	Söyüncü 26'; Becão (yellow card) 33'; Müldür (yellow card) 55'; Burgess 82' (o.g.); Osayi-Samuel (yellow card) 87' (yellow-red card) 90'	Report	Mac Allister (red card) 73'; Boufal (yellow card) 80'; Ivanović (penalty missed) 90+2'; Sykes 90+3'; Vanhoutte (yellow card) 90+6'	Stadium: Şükrü Saracoğlu Stadium; Attendance: 31,760; Referee: Benoît Bastien (France)

3 October 2024 2	Twente (Netherlands)	1–1	(Turkey) Fenerbahçe	Enschede, Netherlands
21:00 CEST (UTC+2)	Vlap (yellow card) 13', (goal) 28'; Hilgers (yellow card) 59'; Tytoń (yellow card) 76'	Report	Oosterwolde (yellow card) 12'; Fred (yellow card) 41'; Kahveci (yellow card) 56'; Becão (yellow card) 68'; Tadić 71'; Amrabat (yellow card) 75'	Stadium: De Grolsch Veste; Attendance: 29,000; Referee: Chris Kavanagh (England)

24 October 2024 3	Fenerbahçe (Turkey)	1–1	(England) Manchester United	Istanbul, Turkey
22:00 TRT (UTC+3)	En-Nesyri 49'; Osayi-Samuel (yellow card) 60'; Müldür (yellow card) 90+2'	Report	Rashford (yellow card) 14'; Eriksen 15'	Stadium: Şükrü Saracoğlu Stadium; Attendance: 41,443; Referee: Clément Turpin (France)

7 November 2024 4	AZ (Netherlands)	3–1	(Turkey) Fenerbahçe	Alkmaar, Netherlands
21:00 CET (UTC+1)	Kwakman (yellow card) 51'; Daal 59', (yellow card) 90+2'; Smith 75'; Kasius 87'	Report	Saint-Maximin (yellow card) 49'; Yüksek (yellow card) 54'; Becão (yellow card) 63'; En-Nesyri (penalty missed) 62', 70'; Fred (yellow card) 84'; Osayi-Samuel (yellow card) 86'; Džeko (yellow card) 90+4'	Stadium: AFAS Stadion; Attendance: 15,383; Referee: John Beaton (Scotland)

28 November 2024 5	Slavia Prague (Czech Republic)	1–2	(Turkey) Fenerbahçe	Prague, Czech Republic
21:00 CET (UTC+1)	Chorý 7', (yellow card) 53'; Zafeiris (yellow card) 17'; Provod (yellow card) 45'; Diouf (yellow card) 48'	Report	Saint-Maximin (yellow card) 33'; Džeko 35', (yellow card) 41'; Fred (yellow card) 41'; Akaydin (yellow card) 45'; Tadić (yellow card) 66'; Yüksek (yellow card) 82'; En-Nesyri 85'	Stadium: Fortuna Arena; Attendance: 19,308; Referee: Sascha Stegemann (Germany)

11 December 2024 6	Fenerbahçe (Turkey)	0–2	(Spain) Athletic Bilbao	Istanbul, Turkey
18:30 TRT (UTC+3)	Müldür (yellow card) 57' (yellow-red card) 69'; Amrabat (yellow card) 90+1'	Report	I. Williams 5', 45'; Yeray (yellow card) 7'; Gómez (yellow card) 80'; Sancet (yellow card) 90+1'	Stadium: Şükrü Saracoğlu Stadium; Attendance: 35,263; Referee: Irfan Peljto (Bosnia and Herzegovina)

23 January 2025 7	Fenerbahçe (Turkey)	0–0	(France) Lyon	Istanbul, Turkey
20:45 TRT (UTC+3)	Kahveci (yellow card) 32'; Akçiçek (yellow card) 64'; Amrabat (yellow card) 72'; Osayi-Samuel (yellow card) 87'	Report	Kumbedi (yellow card) 31'; Niakhaté (yellow card) 45+8'; Lacazette (yellow card) 50'; Ćaleta-Car (yellow card) 74'; Tolisso (yellow card) 77'	Stadium: Şükrü Saracoğlu Stadium; Attendance: 36,722; Referee: Simone Sozza (Italy)

30 January 2025 8	Midtjylland (Denmark)	2–2	(Turkey) Fenerbahçe	Herning, Denmark
21:00 CET (UTC+1)	Diao 27'; Byskov 86'	Report	En-Nesyri 39'; Džeko 47'; Söyüncü (yellow card) 76'; Djiku (yellow card) 88'; Fred (yellow card) 90+3'	Stadium: MCH Arena; Attendance: 9,693; Referee: Luis Godinho (Portugal)

==== Knockout phase ====
===== Knockout phase play-offs =====
The draw for the knockout phase play-offs was held on 31 January 2025.

13 February 2025 First leg	Fenerbahçe (Turkey)	3–0	(Belgium) Anderlecht	Istanbul, Turkey
20:45 TRT (UTC+3)	Tadić 11'; Osayi-Samuel (yellow card) 29'; Džeko 42'; Amrabat (yellow card) 45'; En-Nesyri 57'	Report	Huerta (yellow card) 8'	Stadium: Şükrü Saracoğlu Stadium; Attendance: 34,517; Referee: Nikola Dabanović (Montenegro)

20 February 2025 Second leg	Anderlecht (Belgium)	2–2 (2–5 agg.)	(Turkey) Fenerbahçe	Brussels, Belgium
21:00 CET (UTC+1)	Vázquez 19', 55'; Leoni (yellow card) 36'	Report	En-Nesyri 4', (yellow card) 24'; Fred (yellow card) 45+1'; Osayi-Samuel (yellow card) 53'; Akçiçek 63'	Stadium: Constant Vanden Stock Stadium; Attendance: 13,724; Referee: Sandro Schärer (Switzerland)

===== Round of 16 =====
6 March 2025 First leg	Fenerbahçe (Turkey)	1–3	(Scotland) Rangers	Istanbul, Turkey
20:45 TRT (UTC+3)	Djiku 30'; Talisca (yellow card) 67'	Report	Dessers 6'; Černý 42', 81'; Souttar (yellow card) 54'	Stadium: Şükrü Saracoğlu Stadium; Attendance: 42,090; Referee: Alejandro Hernández Hernández (Spain)

13 March 2025 Second leg	Rangers (Scotland)	0–2 (a.e.t.) (3–3 agg.) (3–2 p)	(Turkey) Fenerbahçe	Glasgow, Scotland
20:00 GMT (UTC+0)	Sterling (yellow card) 25'; Balogun (yellow card) 30'; Souttar (yellow card) 37'; Diomande (yellow card) 45+2'; Dessers (yellow card) 45+2'; Hagi (yellow card) 90+3'; Yılmaz (yellow card) 116'	Report	Talisca (yellow card) 19'; Yandaş (yellow card) 20'; Szymański 45', 73'; Djiku (yellow card) 108'; Kahveci (yellow card) 117'	Stadium: Ibrox Stadium; Attendance: 50,061; Referee: Espen Eskås (Norway)
	Penalties
	Tavernier (penalty scored); Černý (penalty scored); Hagi (penalty missed); Lawrence (penalty scored)		(penalty missed) Tadić; (penalty scored) Džeko; (penalty scored) Djiku; (penalty missed) Fred; (penalty missed) Yandaş

== Statistics ==
=== Appearances and goals ===
No.	Pos	Nat	Player	Total		Süper Lig		Turkish Cup		Champions League		Europa League	
No.	Pos	Nat	Player	Apps	Goals	Apps	Goals	Apps	Goals	Apps	Goals	Apps	Goals
Goalkeepers
1	GK	(Turkey) TUR	İrfan Can Eğribayat	21	0	13	0	2	0	0	0	6	0
40	GK	(Croatia) CRO	Dominik Livaković	32	0	22	0	0	0	4	0	6	0
54	GK	(Turkey) TUR	Ertuğrul Çetin	4	0	2	0	2	0	0	0	0	0
Defenders
4	DF	(Turkey) TUR	Çağlar Söyüncü	40	2	25	1	4	0	4	0	7	1
6	DF	(Ghana) GHA	Alexander Djiku	38	1	25	0	1	0	4	0	8	1
16	DF	(Turkey) TUR	Mert Müldür	46	3	29	3	3	0	4	0	10	0
21	DF	(Nigeria) NGR	Bright Osayi-Samuel	39	0	25	0	2	0	3	0	9	0
22	DF	(Turkey) TUR	Levent Mercan	13	0	11	0	2	0	0	0	0	0
24	DF	(Netherlands) NED	Jayden Oosterwolde	14	0	8	0	0	0	4	0	2	0
33	DF	(Brazil) BRA	Diego Carlos	5	0	4	0	1	0	0	0	0	0
37	DF	(Slovakia) SVK	Milan Škriniar	23	3	16	3	3	0	0	0	4	0
50	DF	(Brazil) BRA	Rodrigo Becão	15	1	11	1	0	0	0	0	4	0
65	DF	(Turkey) TUR	Muharrem Çizgili	1	0	0	0	1	0	0	0	0	0
95	DF	(Turkey) TUR	Yusuf Akçiçek	20	2	9	0	4	1	0	0	7	1
Midfielders
5	MF	(Turkey) TUR	İsmail Yüksek	30	0	20	0	1	0	3	0	6	0
7	MF	(Turkey) TUR	Burak Kapacak	1	0	1	0	0	0	0	0	0	0
8	MF	(Turkey) TUR	Mert Hakan Yandaş	27	1	13	0	3	1	3	0	8	0
10	MF	(Serbia) SRB	Dušan Tadić	53	13	35	11	2	0	4	0	12	2
13	MF	(Brazil) BRA	Fred	45	5	31	5	2	0	2	0	10	0
17	MF	(Turkey) TUR	İrfan Kahveci	42	3	26	2	2	0	4	1	10	0
18	MF	(Serbia) SRB	Filip Kostić	35	2	27	1	4	1	0	0	4	0
34	MF	(Morocco) MAR	Sofyan Amrabat	39	2	26	2	3	0	0	0	10	0
53	MF	(Poland) POL	Sebastian Szymański	53	7	35	3	2	1	4	1	12	2
94	MF	(Brazil) BRA	Talisca	23	12	16	9	3	3	0	0	4	0
Forwards
9	FW	(Bosnia and Herzegovina) BIH	Edin Džeko	53	21	35	14	2	0	4	4	12	3
19	FW	(Morocco) MAR	Youssef En-Nesyri	52	30	34	20	4	4	2	0	12	6
23	FW	(Turkey) TUR	Cenk Tosun	22	2	12	1	2	1	2	0	6	0
70	FW	(Turkey) TUR	Oğuz Aydın	30	7	25	7	3	0	2	0	0	0
97	FW	(France) FRA	Allan Saint-Maximin	31	4	20	4	2	0	2	0	7	0
Players transferred/loaned out during the season
3	DF	(Turkey) TUR	Samet Akaydin	7	1	5	1	0	0	0	0	2	0
4	DF	(Turkey) TUR	Serdar Aziz	0	0	0	0	0	0	0	0	0	0
7	MF	(Turkey) TUR	Ferdi Kadıoğlu	5	1	2	0	0	0	3	1	0	0
11	MF	(England) ENG	Ryan Kent	1	0	0	0	0	0	1	0	0	0
13	MF	(Portugal) POR	Miguel Crespo	0	0	0	0	0	0	0	0	0	0
14	DF	(Brazil) BRA	Luan Peres	0	0	0	0	0	0	0	0	0	0
20	FW	(Turkey) TUR	Cengiz Ünder	9	0	3	0	2	0	0	0	4	0
26	MF	(Slovenia) SLO	Miha Zajc	0	0	0	0	0	0	0	0	0	0
28	MF	(Turkey) TUR	Bartuğ Elmaz	4	1	2	0	1	1	1	0	0	0
33	MF	(Bosnia and Herzegovina) BIH	Rade Krunić	4	0	1	0	0	0	3	0	0	0
77	DF	(Serbia) SRB	Ognjen Mimović	0	0	0	0	0	0	0	0	0	0
99	FW	(Turkey) TUR	Emre Mor	0	0	0	0	0	0	0	0	0	0
—	FW	(Italy) ITA	João Pedro	0	0	0	0	0	0	0	0	0	0
—	FW	(Turkey) TUR	Umut Nayir	0	0	0	0	0	0	0	0	0	0

Last updated: 31 May 2025.

=== Goalscorers ===
Rank	No.	Pos	Nat	Player	Süper Lig	Turkish Cup	Champions League	Europa League	Total
1	19	FW	(Morocco)	Youssef En-Nesyri	16	4	0	6	26
2	9	FW	(Bosnia and Herzegovina)	Edin Džeko	12	0	4	3	19
3	10	MF	(Serbia)	Dušan Tadić	9	0	0	2	11
4	53	MF	(Poland)	Sebastian Szymański	3	0	1	2	6
4	70	FW	(Turkey)	Oğuz Aydın	6	0	0	0	6
6	94	MF	(Brazil)	Talisca	2	3	0	0	5
7	13	MF	(Brazil)	Fred	4	0	0	0	4
8	97	FW	(France)	Allan Saint-Maximin	3	0	0	0	3
9	4	DF	(Turkey)	Çağlar Söyüncü	1	0	0	1	2
9	16	DF	(Turkey)	Mert Müldür	2	0	0	0	2
9	18	MF	(Serbia)	Filip Kostić	1	1	0	0	2
9	23	FW	(Turkey)	Cenk Tosun	1	1	0	0	2
9	34	MF	(Morocco)	Sofyan Amrabat	2	0	0	0	2
9	95	DF	(Turkey)	Yusuf Akçiçek	0	1	0	1	2
15	3	DF	(Turkey)	Samet Akaydin	1	0	0	0	1
15	6	DF	(Ghana)	Alexander Djiku	0	0	0	1	1
15	7	MF	(Turkey)	Ferdi Kadıoğlu	0	0	1	0	1
15	8	MF	(Turkey)	Mert Hakan Yandaş	0	1	0	0	1
15	17	MF	(Turkey)	İrfan Kahveci	0	0	1	0	1
15	28	MF	(Turkey)	Bartuğ Elmaz	0	1	0	0	1
15	37	DF	(Slovakia)	Milan Škriniar	1	0	0	0	1
15	50	DF	(Brazil)	Rodrigo Becão	1	0	0	0	1
Own goals					2	0	1	1	4
Totals					67	12	8	17	104

Last updated: 28 March 2025.

=== Hat-tricks ===
Player	Against	Result	Date	Competition	Ref
(Bosnia and Herzegovina) Edin Džeko	Lugano	4–3 (A)	23 July 2024	Champions League	
(Brazil) Fred	Çaykur Rizespor	5–0 (A)	25 August 2024	Süper Lig	

(H) – Home; (A) – Away

=== Assists ===
Rank	No.	Pos	Nat	Player	Süper Lig	Turkish Cup	Champions League	Europa League	Total
1	10	MF	(Serbia)	Dušan Tadić	10	0	2	1	13
2	53	MF	(Poland)	Sebastian Szymański	5	0	1	3	9
3	9	FW	(Bosnia and Herzegovina)	Edin Džeko	3	0	0	3	6
3	13	MF	(Brazil)	Fred	4	1	1	0	6
3	70	FW	(Turkey)	Oğuz Aydın	2	4	0	0	6
6	19	FW	(Morocco)	Youssef En-Nesyri	4	1	0	0	5
7	8	MF	(Turkey)	Mert Hakan Yandaş	2	1	1	0	4
7	16	DF	(Turkey)	Mert Müldür	2	1	0	1	4
7	18	MF	(Serbia)	Filip Kostić	4	0	0	0	4
10	17	MF	(Turkey)	İrfan Kahveci	2	1	0	0	3
10	34	MF	(Morocco)	Sofyan Amrabat	2	0	0	1	3
10	97	FW	(France)	Allan Saint-Maximin	2	0	0	1	3
13	4	DF	(Turkey)	Çağlar Söyüncü	1	0	0	0	1
13	23	FW	(Turkey)	Cenk Tosun	0	1	0	0	1
13	37	DF	(Slovakia)	Milan Škriniar	0	0	0	1	1
13	50	DF	(Brazil)	Rodrigo Becão	0	0	0	1	1
13	95	DF	(Turkey)	Yusuf Akçiçek	0	0	0	1	1
Totals					43	10	5	13	71

Last updated: 28 March 2025.

=== Clean sheets ===
Rank	No.	Pos	Nat	Player	Süper Lig	Turkish Cup	Champions League	Europa League	Total
1	40	GK	(Croatia)	Dominik Livaković	8	0	0	0	8
2	1	GK	(Turkey)	İrfan Can Eğribayat	4	0	0	3	7
3	54	GK	(Turkey)	Ertuğrul Çetin	0	2	0	0	2
Totals					12	2	0	3	17

Last updated: 16 March 2025.

=== Disciplinary record ===
No.	Pos	Nat	Player	Süper Lig			Turkish Cup			Champions League			Europa League			Total		
No.	Pos	Nat	Player	Yellow card	(yellow card) (yellow-red card)	Red card	Yellow card	(yellow card) (yellow-red card)	Red card	Yellow card	(yellow card) (yellow-red card)	Red card	Yellow card	(yellow card) (yellow-red card)	Red card	Yellow card	(yellow card) (yellow-red card)	Red card
1	GK	(Turkey)	İrfan Can Eğribayat	0	0	0	0	0	0	0	0	0	0	0	0	0	0	0
4	DF	(Turkey)	Çağlar Söyüncü	3	0	0	0	0	0	2	0	0	1	0	0	6	0	0
5	MF	(Turkey)	İsmail Yüksek	2	0	0	0	0	0	0	0	0	2	0	0	4	0	0
6	DF	(Ghana)	Alexander Djiku	5	0	0	1	0	0	1	0	0	2	0	0	9	0	0
7	MF	(Turkey)	Burak Kapacak	0	0	0	0	0	0	0	0	0	0	0	0	0	0	0
8	MF	(Turkey)	Mert Hakan Yandaş	3	0	0	0	0	0	0	0	0	1	0	0	4	0	0
9	FW	(Bosnia and Herzegovina)	Edin Džeko	1	0	0	0	0	0	2	0	0	2	0	0	5	0	0
10	MF	(Serbia)	Dušan Tadić	2	0	0	0	0	0	1	0	0	1	0	0	4	0	0
13	MF	(Brazil)	Fred	5	0	0	0	0	0	0	0	0	5	0	0	10	0	0
16	DF	(Turkey)	Mert Müldür	1	0	0	1	0	0	1	0	0	3	1	0	6	1	0
17	MF	(Turkey)	İrfan Kahveci	3	0	0	0	0	0	0	0	0	3	0	0	6	0	0
18	MF	(Serbia)	Filip Kostić	3	0	0	0	0	0	0	0	0	0	0	0	3	0	0
19	FW	(Morocco)	Youssef En-Nesyri	4	0	0	0	0	0	0	0	0	1	0	0	5	0	0
20	FW	(Turkey)	Cengiz Ünder	1	0	0	0	0	0	0	0	0	0	0	0	1	0	0
21	DF	(Nigeria)	Bright Osayi-Samuel	1	0	0	0	0	0	0	0	0	6	1	0	7	1	0
22	DF	(Turkey)	Levent Mercan	0	0	0	0	0	0	0	0	0	0	0	0	0	0	0
23	FW	(Turkey)	Cenk Tosun	0	0	0	0	0	0	1	0	0	0	0	0	1	0	0
24	DF	(Netherlands)	Jayden Oosterwolde	3	0	0	0	0	0	2	0	0	1	0	0	6	0	0
33	DF	(Brazil)	Diego Carlos	0	0	0	0	0	0	0	0	0	0	0	0	0	0	0
34	MF	(Morocco)	Sofyan Amrabat	6	0	0	0	0	0	0	0	0	4	0	0	10	0	0
37	DF	(Slovakia)	Milan Škriniar	1	0	0	0	0	0	0	0	0	0	0	0	1	0	0
40	GK	(Croatia)	Dominik Livaković	0	0	0	0	0	0	0	0	0	0	0	0	0	0	0
50	DF	(Brazil)	Rodrigo Becão	1	0	0	0	0	0	0	0	0	3	0	0	4	0	0
53	MF	(Poland)	Sebastian Szymański	4	0	0	0	0	0	0	0	0	0	0	0	4	0	0
54	GK	(Turkey)	Ertuğrul Çetin	0	0	0	0	0	0	0	0	0	0	0	0	0	0	0
70	FW	(Turkey)	Oğuz Aydın	1	0	0	0	0	0	0	0	0	0	0	0	1	0	0
94	MF	(Brazil)	Talisca	1	0	0	0	0	0	0	0	0	2	0	0	3	0	0
95	DF	(Turkey)	Yusuf Akçiçek	0	0	0	1	0	0	0	0	0	1	0	0	2	0	0
97	FW	(France)	Allan Saint-Maximin	3	0	0	0	0	0	0	0	0	2	0	0	5	0	0

Last updated: 28 March 2025.
