= FC Midtjylland in European football =

- Club: FC Midtjylland
- First entry: 2001–02 UEFA Cup
- Latest entry: 2026–27 UEFA Europa League

This is the list of all FC Midtjylland's European matches.

== Overall record ==
=== Overview ===
Accurate as of 23 July 2026

Competition	Played	Won	Drew	Lost	GF	GA	GD	Win%
European Cup / Champions League	30	10	9	11	35	37	−2	33.33
UEFA Cup / UEFA Europa League	105	47	20	38	173	130	+43	44.76
UEFA Europa Conference League	8	3	2	3	14	10	+4	37.50
Total	143	60	31	52	222	177	+45	41.96

Legend: GF = Goals For. GA = Goals Against. GD = Goal Difference.

=== Results ===
Season	Competition	Round	Opponent	Home	Away	Aggregate
2001–02	UEFA Cup	QR	(Northern Ireland) Glentoran	1–1	4–0	5–1
2001–02	UEFA Cup	1R	(Portugal) Sporting CP	0–3	2–3	2–6
2002–03	UEFA Cup	QR	(North Macedonia) Pobeda	3–0	0–2	3–2
2002–03	UEFA Cup	1R	(Croatia) Varteks	1–0	1–1	2–1
2002–03	UEFA Cup	2R	(Belgium) Anderlecht	0–3	1–3	1–6
2005–06	UEFA Cup	1Q	(Faroe Islands) B36 Tórshavn	2–1	2–2	4–3
2005–06	UEFA Cup	1R	(Russia) CSKA Moscow	1–3	1–3	2–6
2007–08	UEFA Cup	1Q	(Iceland) Keflavík	2–1	2–3	4–4 (a)
2007–08	UEFA Cup	2Q	(Finland) Haka	5–2	2–1	7–3
2007–08	UEFA Cup	1R	(Russia) Lokomotiv Moscow	1–3	0–2	1–5
2008–09	UEFA Cup	1Q	(Wales) Bangor City	4–0	6–1	10–1
2008–09	UEFA Cup	2Q	(England) Manchester City	0–1 (a.e.t.)	1–0	1–1 (2–4 p)
2011–12	UEFA Europa League	2Q	(Wales) The New Saints	5–2	3–1	8–3
2011–12	UEFA Europa League	3Q	(Portugal) Vitória de Guimarães	0–0	1–2	1–2
2012–13	UEFA Europa League	PO	(Switzerland) Young Boys	0–3	2–0	2–3
2014–15	UEFA Europa League	PO	(Greece) Panathinaikos	1–2	1–4	2–6
2015–16	UEFA Champions League	2Q	(Gibraltar) Lincoln Red Imps	1–0	2–0	3–0
2015–16	UEFA Champions League	3Q	(Cyprus) APOEL	1–2	1–0	2–2 (a)
2015–16	UEFA Europa League	PO	(England) Southampton	1–0	1–1	2–1
2015–16	UEFA Europa League	Group D	(Italy) Napoli	1–4	0–5	2nd
2015–16	UEFA Europa League	Group D	(Belgium) Club Brugge	1–1	3–1	2nd
2015–16	UEFA Europa League	Group D	(Poland) Legia Warsaw	1–0	0–1	2nd
2015–16	UEFA Europa League	R32	(England) Manchester United	2–1	1–5	3–6
2016–17	UEFA Europa League	1Q	(Lithuania) Sūduva Marijampolė	1–0	1–0	2–0
2016–17	UEFA Europa League	2Q	(Liechtenstein) Vaduz	3–0	2–2	5–2
2016–17	UEFA Europa League	3Q	(Hungary) Videoton	1–1 (a.e.t.)	1–0	2–1
2016–17	UEFA Europa League	PO	(Turkey) Osmanlıspor	0–1	0–2	0–3
2017–18	UEFA Europa League	1Q	(Republic of Ireland) Derry City	6–1	4–1	10–2
2017–18	UEFA Europa League	2Q	(Hungary) Ferencváros	3–1	4–2	7–3
2017–18	UEFA Europa League	3Q	(Poland) Arka Gdynia	2–1	2–3	4–4 (a)
2017–18	UEFA Europa League	PO	(Cyprus) Apollon Limassol	1–1	2–3	3–4
2018–19	UEFA Champions League	2Q	(Kazakhstan) Astana	0–0	1–2	1–2
2018–19	UEFA Europa League	3Q	(Wales) The New Saints	3–1	2–0	5–1
2018–19	UEFA Europa League	PO	(Sweden) Malmö FF	0–2	2–2	2–4
2019–20	UEFA Europa League	2Q	(Scotland) Rangers	2–4	1–3	3–7
2020–21	UEFA Champions League	2Q	(Bulgaria) Ludogorets Razgrad	—N/a	1–0	—N/a
2020–21	UEFA Champions League	3Q	(Switzerland) Young Boys	3–0	—N/a	—N/a
2020–21	UEFA Champions League	PO	(Czech Republic) Slavia Prague	4–1	0–0	4–1
2020–21	UEFA Champions League	Group D	(England) Liverpool	1–1	0–2	4th
2020–21	UEFA Champions League	Group D	(Netherlands) Ajax	1–2	1–3	4th
2020–21	UEFA Champions League	Group D	(Italy) Atalanta	0–4	1–1	4th
2021–22	UEFA Champions League	2Q	(Scotland) Celtic	2–1	1–1	3–1
2021–22	UEFA Champions League	3Q	(Netherlands) PSV Eindhoven	0–3	0–1	0–4
2021–22	UEFA Europa League	Group F	(Portugal) Braga	3–2	1–3	3rd
2021–22	UEFA Europa League	Group F	(Serbia) Red Star Belgrade	1–1	1–0	3rd
2021–22	UEFA Europa League	Group F	(Bulgaria) Ludogorets Razgrad	1–1	0–0	3rd
2021–22	UEFA Europa Conference League	Knockout round play-offs	(Greece) PAOK	1–0	1–2 (a.e.t.)	2–2 (3–5 p)
2022–23	UEFA Champions League	2Q	(Cyprus) AEK Larnaca	1–1	1–1 (a.e.t.)	2–2 (4–3 p)
2022–23	UEFA Champions League	3Q	(Portugal) Benfica	1–3	1–4	2–7
2022–23	UEFA Europa League	Group F	(Italy) Lazio	5–1	1–2	2nd
2022–23	UEFA Europa League	Group F	(Netherlands) Feyenoord	2–2	2–2	2nd
2022–23	UEFA Europa League	Group F	(Austria) Sturm Graz	2–0	0–1	2nd
2022–23	UEFA Europa League	Knockout round play-offs	(Portugal) Sporting CP	0–4	1–1	1–5
2023–24	UEFA Europa Conference League	2Q	(Luxembourg) Progrès Niederkorn	2–0	1–2	3–2
2023–24	UEFA Europa Conference League	3Q	(Cyprus) Omonia	5–1	0–1	5–2
2023–24	UEFA Europa Conference League	PO	(Poland) Legia Warsaw	3–3	1–1 (a.e.t.)	4–4 (6–7 p)
2024–25	UEFA Champions League	2Q	(Andorra) UE Santa Coloma	1–0	3–0	4–0
2024–25	UEFA Champions League	3Q	(Hungary) Ferencváros	2–0	1–1	3–1
2024–25	UEFA Champions League	PO	(Slovakia) Slovan Bratislava	1–1	2–3	3–4
2024–25	UEFA Europa League	League phase	(Germany) TSG Hoffenheim	1–1	—N/a	20th
2024–25	UEFA Europa League	League phase	(Israel) Maccabi Tel Aviv	—N/a	2–0	20th
2024–25	UEFA Europa League	League phase	(Belgium) Union Saint-Gilloise	1–0	—N/a	20th
2024–25	UEFA Europa League	League phase	(Romania) FCSB	—N/a	0–2	20th
2024–25	UEFA Europa League	League phase	(Germany) Eintracht Frankfurt	1–2	—N/a	20th
2024–25	UEFA Europa League	League phase	(Portugal) Porto	—N/a	0–2	20th
2024–25	UEFA Europa League	League phase	(Bulgaria) Ludogorets Razgrad	—N/a	2–0	20th
2024–25	UEFA Europa League	League phase	(Turkey) Fenerbahçe	2–2	—N/a	20th
2024–25	UEFA Europa League	Knockout phase play-offs	(Spain) Real Sociedad	1–2	2–5	3–7
2025–26	UEFA Europa League	2Q	(Scotland) Hibernian	1–1	2–1	3–2
2025–26	UEFA Europa League	3Q	(Norway) Fredrikstad	2–0	3–1	5–1
2025–26	UEFA Europa League	PO	(Finland) KuPS	4–0	2–0	6–0
2025–26	UEFA Europa League	League phase	(Austria) Sturm Graz	2–0	—N/a	3rd
2025–26	UEFA Europa League	League phase	(England) Nottingham Forest	—N/a	3–2	3rd
2025–26	UEFA Europa League	League phase	(Israel) Maccabi Tel Aviv	—N/a	3–0	3rd
2025–26	UEFA Europa League	League phase	(Scotland) Celtic	3–1	—N/a	3rd
2025–26	UEFA Europa League	League phase	(Italy) Roma	—N/a	1–2	3rd
2025–26	UEFA Europa League	League phase	(Belgium) Genk	1–0	—N/a	3rd
2025–26	UEFA Europa League	League phase	(Norway) Brann	—N/a	3–3	3rd
2025–26	UEFA Europa League	League phase	(Croatia) Dinamo Zagreb	2–0	—N/a	3rd
2025–26	UEFA Europa League	R16	(England) Nottingham Forest	1–2 (a.e.t.)	1–0	2–2 (0–3 p)
2026–27	UEFA Europa League	2Q	(Turkey) Beşiktaş	0–2	0–1	0–3
2026–27	UEFA Conference League	3Q	(Republic of Ireland) Bohemians	3–2	2–0	5–2
2026–27	UEFA Conference League	PO	(Croatia) Rijeka	2–0	4–1	6–1
2026–27	UEFA Conference League	League phase	(Albania) Egnatia	—N/a		
2026–27	UEFA Conference League	League phase	(Belgium) Sint-Truiden		—N/a	
2026–27	UEFA Conference League	League phase	(Netherlands) Ajax		—N/a	
2026–27	UEFA Conference League	League phase	(Cyprus) Pafos	—N/a		
2026–27	UEFA Conference League	League phase	(Gibraltar) Lincoln Red Imps	—N/a		
2026–27	UEFA Conference League	League phase	(Croatia) Hajduk Split		—N/a	
