= Bartuğ Elmaz =

Turkish footballer (born 2003)

Personal information
- Full name: Bartuğ Elmaz
- Date of birth: 19 February 2003 (age 23)
- Place of birth: Tekirdağ, Turkey
- Height: 1.79 m (5 ft 10 in)
- Position: Defensive midfielder

Team information
- Current team: Fenerbahçe
- Number: 28

Youth career
- 2013–2021: Galatasaray

Senior career*
Years	Team	Apps	(Gls)
2020–2022	Galatasaray	1	(0)
2022–2023	Marseille	0	(0)
2022–2023	Marseille II	6	(2)
2023–	Fenerbahçe	15	(0)
2024	→ Sivasspor (loan)	12	(0)
2025	→ Maribor (loan)	17	(2)
2026	→ Fatih Karagümrük (loan)	16	(1)

International career^{‡}
2017–2018	Turkey U15	6	(2)
2018–2019	Turkey U16	15	(2)
2019–2020	Turkey U17	14	(3)
2021–2022	Turkey U19	13	(3)
2023–2025	Turkey U21	14	(3)
2026–	Turkey	2	(0)
- * Club domestic league appearances and goals as of 14 September 2026 ‡ National team caps and goals as of 5 October 2026

Bartuğ Elmaz (born 19 February 2003) is a Turkish professional footballer who plays as a defensive midfielder for Süper Lig club Fenerbahçe and the Turkey national team.

== Club career ==
=== Galatasaray ===
Elmaz is a product of Galatasaray Academy. On 17 November 2020, he signed his first professional contract with Galatasaray. The following month, on 22 December 2020, Elmaz made his professional debut for Galatasaray in a 3–1 Süper Lig win over Göztepe.

=== Marseille ===
In January 2022, Elmaz signed a pre-contract deal to join Marseille. He officially joined the Ligue 1 team in June 2022. He made his debut for the team in a 2–0 win over Hyères in the Coupe de France match on 7 January 2023.

=== Fenerbahçe ===
On 20 July 2023, Elmaz joined Fenerbahçe on a three-year contract.

He made his debut with the team in a 3–0 UEFA Europa Conference League win over Maribor on 17 August 2023. On 21 August 2023, he made his Süper Lig debut against Samsunspor in an away match, which Fenerbahçe won 2–0. On 9 January 2025, Elmaz scored his first goal for Fenerbahçe against Kasımpaşa in a Turkish Cup match, helping his team to a 3–0 win.

On 12 September 2025, he extended his contract until the end of the 2027–28 season.

On 9 September 2026, he made his Champions League league phase debut as a starter in the 1-1 draw, 2026–27 UEFA Champions League opening week match against Roma, and shown a successful performance.

==== Sivasspor (loan) ====
On 30 January 2024, Elmaz signed with Sivasspor on loan for the remainder of the 2023–24 season. He made twelve Süper Lig appearances for the club, scoring no goals.

==== Maribor (loan) ====
After failing to make a breakthrough at Fenerbahçe, the club sent Elmaz on loan to Slovenian PrvaLiga outfit Maribor on 31 January 2025, until the end of the season. He was assigned the number 70 shirt. Elmaz made his debut for the Purples the following day in a PrvaLiga match against Domžale, after being named in the starting eleven in an eventual 2–1 win.

==== Fatih Karagümrük (loan) ====
On 23 January 2026, he signed loan deal with Süper Lig club Fatih Karagümrük until the end of the 2025–26 season. On March 13, he scored his first Süper Lig goal against Fenerbahçe, in a 2-0 home victory.

== International career ==
Elmaz is a youth international for Turkey, having represented the Turkey U15s, U16s, U17s, U19s and U21s, amassing over 60 caps for all teams combined.

On 18 September 2026, Elmaz was called up by Vincenzo Montella for the UEFA Nations League matches against France, Italy and Belgium. He made his senior national team debut on 2 October 2026, as a starter against Belgium.

== Style of play ==
Elmaz is an all-round box-to-box midfielder, with excellent dribbling skills and ball control, which allows him to operate effectively in a deep-seated playmaking role as a central midfielder.

== Career statistics ==
=== Club ===
As of match played 14 October 2026

Appearances and goals by club, season and competition
Club	Season	League			National cup (Note: Includes Coupe de France, Turkish Cup, Slovenian Cup)		Continental		Other		Total	
Club	Season	Division	Apps	Goals	Apps	Goals	Apps	Goals	Apps	Goals	Apps	Goals
Galatasaray	2020–21	Süper Lig	1	0	0	0	0	0	—		1	0
Galatasaray	2021–22	Süper Lig	0	0	0	0	1 (Note: Appearance in UEFA Europa League)	0	—		1	0
Galatasaray	Total		1	0	0	0	1	0	0	0	2	0
Marseille	2022–23	Ligue 1	0	0	1	0	0	0	6 (Note: Appearances in Championnat National 3)	2	7	2
Fenerbahçe	2023–24	Süper Lig	5	0	1	0	2 (Note: Appearances in UEFA Europa Conference League)	0	—		8	0
Fenerbahçe	2024–25	Süper Lig	2	0	1	1	1 (Note: Appearances in UEFA Champions League)	0	—		4	1
Fenerbahçe	2025–26	Süper Lig	5	0	1	0	1	0	1 (Note: Appearance in Turkish Super Cup)	0	8	0
Fenerbahçe	2026–27	Süper Lig	3	0	0	0	3	0	0	0	6	0
Fenerbahçe	Total		15	0	3	1	7	0	1	0	26	1
Sivasspor (loan)	2023–24	Süper Lig	12	0	0	0	—		—		12	0
Maribor (loan)	2024–25	Slovenian PrvaLiga	17	2	2	0	—		—		19	2
Fatih Karagümrük (loan)	2025–26	Süper Lig	16	1	1	0	—		—		17	1
Career total			61	3	7	1	8	0	7	2	83	6

=== International ===
As of match played 5 October 2026

Appearances and goals by national team and year
National team	Year	Apps	Goals
Turkey	2026	2	0
Total		2	1

== Honours ==
Fenerbahçe

- Turkish Super Cup: 2025
