= Yusuf Akçiçek =

Turkish footballer (born 2006)

Personal information
- Full name: Yusuf Akçiçek
- Date of birth: 25 January 2006 (age 20)
- Place of birth: Bakırköy, Turkey
- Height: 1.93 m (6 ft 4 in)
- Position: Centre back

Team information
- Current team: Al-Hilal
- Number: 4

Youth career
- 2016–2019: Galatasaray
- 2019–2023: Fenerbahçe

Senior career*
| Years | Team | Apps | (Gls) |
| 2023–2025 | Fenerbahçe | 11 | (0) |
| 2025– | Al-Hilal | 14 | (0) |

International career^{‡}
| 2023 | Turkey U17 | 8 | (0) |
| 2023 | Turkey U18 | 13 | (0) |
| 2024– | Turkey U19 | 6 | (1) |
| 2025– | Turkey | 3 | (0) |
- * Club domestic league appearances and goals as of 12 September 2026 ‡ National team caps and goals as of 18 November 2025

Yusuf Akçiçek (born 25 January 2006) is a Turkish professional footballer who plays as a centre back for Saudi Pro League club Al-Hilal and the Turkey national team.

== Career ==
=== Early career ===
After starting his youth career at Galatasaray Academy between 2016 and 2019, Akçiçek then moved to Fenerbahçe Academy and played there between 2019 and 2023.

=== Fenerbahçe (2023–2025) ===
Akçiçek signed professional contract with Fenerbahçe senior team on 7 July 2023.

On 9 November 2023, he made his professional debut with the team in a continental match against Ludogorets in UEFA Europa Conference League away game, Fenerbahçe lost 2–0.

On 26 May 2024, he made his Süper Lig debut in a late 89th mins substitute against İstanbulspor in Şükrü Saraçoğlu Stadium, Fenerbahçe won 6–0. On 29 November 2024, he made his UEFA Europa League debut in a 1-2 away win against Slavia Prague in Fortuna Arena.

On 9 January 2025, he scored his first professional career goal with the team against Kasımpaşa in a 3-0 won Turkish Cup away game. On 23 January 2025, his performance was appreciated in the UEFA Europa League match in which Fenerbahçe drew 0-0 with Olympique Lyonnais in Şükrü Saraçoğlu Stadium. On 20 February 2025, he scored his first continental goal in an away 2-2 tie against Anderlecht in UEFA Europa League knockout phase match.

=== Al Hilal (2025–present) ===
On 1 September 2025, Akçiçek joined Saudi Pro League club Al-Hilal until the end of 2028–29 season. On the 16th of that same month, he made his debut in a continental match against Al-Duhail in 2025–26 AFC Champions League Elite league stage first week 2-1 home win as a starter. On 19 September 2025, he made his Saudi Pro League debut against Al-Ahli, in a 3-3 draw.

== International career ==
Akçiçek is a youth international for Turkey, having represented 8 matches for the U17s and 13 matches for the U18s in 2023 and having represented the U19s since 2024.

On 14 March 2025, Akçiçek was called up by Vincenzo Montella to the Turkey national team for the 2024–25 UEFA Nations League promotion play-offs against Hungary. On 23 March 2025, he made his senior national debut against Hungary as 82nd mins substitute in 3-0 away win.

== Style of play ==
A left-footed defender, with good technique and ball-playing ability on the ground, Akçiçek can also play as a left-sided centre-back in a three-man defence system and as a left-back if needed.

On 13 February 2025, after the 3-0 home win UEFA Europa League knockout phase first match against Anderlecht, Fenerbahçe coach Jose Mourinho said about him:

I said it before. I said it at the beginning of the season, before Yusuf even played. I said I wanted to coach and train this player. I know that players who have reached a higher level culturally in Turkey are valued more, but Yusuf is a very talented player. He had a great season, but he needs to keep his feet on the ground. He is a very hard-working and intelligent player.

== Career statistics ==
=== Club ===
As of matches played 15 September 2026

Appearances and goals by club, season and competition
| Club | Season | League | | | Cup (Note: Includes Turkish Cup, King's Cup) | | Continental | | Other | | Total | |
| Club | Season | Division | Apps | Goals | Apps | Goals | Apps | Goals | Apps | Goals | Apps | Goals |
|---|---|---|---|---|---|---|---|---|---|---|---|---|
| Fenerbahçe | 2023–24 | Süper Lig | 1 | 0 | 0 | 0 | 3 (Note: Appearance(s) in UEFA Europa Conference League) | 0 | 11 (Note: One appearance in Turkish Super Cup and 10 appearances and three goal in U19 Elit A Ligi) | 3 | 15 | 3 |
| Fenerbahçe | 2024–25 | Süper Lig | 9 | 0 | 4 | 1 | 7 (Note: Appearance(s) in UEFA Europa League) | 1 | 1 (Note: Appearance(s) in U19 Elit A Ligi) | 0 | 21 | 2 |
| Fenerbahçe | 2025–26 | Süper Lig | 1 | 0 | 0 | 0 | 1 (Note: Appearances in UEFA Champions League) | 0 | 0 | 0 | 2 | 0 |
| Fenerbahçe | Total | | 11 | 0 | 4 | 1 | 11 | 1 | 12 | 3 | 38 | 5 |
| Al-Hilal | 2025–26 | Saudi Pro League | 12 | 0 | 3 | 0 | 7 (Note: Appearances in AFC Champions League Elite) | 1 | — | | 22 | 1 |
| Al-Hilal | 2026–27 | Saudi Pro League | 2 | 0 | 1 | 0 | 2 | 0 | — | | 5 | 0 |
| Al-Hilal | Total | | 14 | 0 | 4 | 1 | 9 | 1 | 0 | 0 | 27 | 1 |
| Career total | | | 25 | 0 | 8 | 1 | 20 | 2 | 12 | 3 | 65 | 6 |

=== International ===
As of match played 18 November 2025

Appearances and goals by national team and year
| National team | Year | Apps | Goals |
|---|---|---|---|
Turkey
| Turkey | 2025 | 3 | 0 |
| Total | | 3 | 0 |
