= Levent Mercan =

German footballer

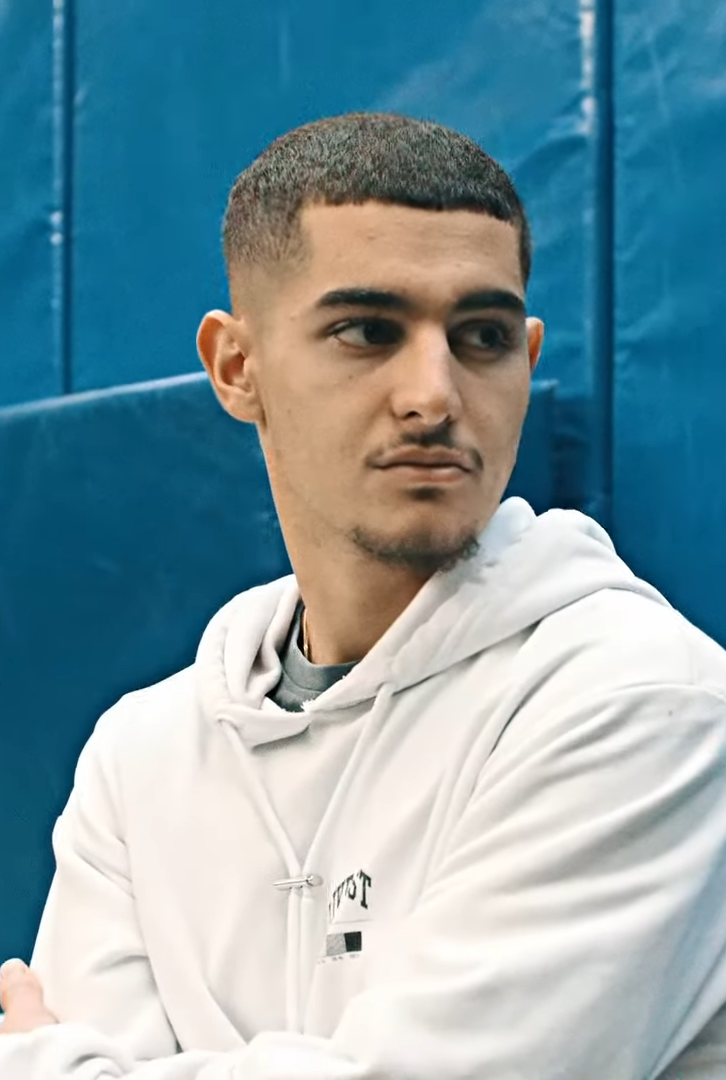
- Mercan in 2019

Personal information
- Full name: Münir Levent Mercan
- Date of birth: 10 December 2000 (age 25)
- Place of birth: Recklinghausen, Germany
- Height: 1.76 m (5 ft 9 in)
- Position: Defender

Team information
- Current team: Fenerbahçe
- Number: 22

Youth career
- 2005–2010: PSV Recklinghausen
- 2010–2011: VfB Hüls
- 2011–2012: VfL Bochum
- 2012–2016: Rot-Weiss Essen
- 2016–2019: Schalke 04

Senior career*
Years	Team	Apps	(Gls)
2018–2020	Schalke 04 II	42	(7)
2020–2022	Schalke 04	6	(0)
2021–2022	→ Fatih Karagümrük (loan)	18	(0)
2022–2024	Fatih Karagümrük	65	(3)
2024–	Fenerbahçe	40	(0)

International career^{‡}
2019	Germany U19	1	(0)
2019	Germany U20	2	(0)
- * Club domestic league appearances and goals as of 8 November 2026 ‡ National team caps and goals as of 19 November 2019

Münir Levent Mercan (born 10 December 2000) is a Turkish footballer who plays as a defender for Süper Lig club Fenerbahçe.

== Career ==
=== Early career ===
Before joining FC Schalke 04 Academy in 2016, Mercan played at youth level for various clubs in the Ruhr region, such as PSV Recklinghausen (2005-2010), VfB Hüls (2010-2011), VfL Bochum (2011-2012) and Rot-Weiss Essen (2012-2016).

=== Schalke ===
Mercan made his professional debut for Schalke 04 in the DFB-Pokal on 10 August 2019. He came on as a substitute in the 61st minute and scored the fourth goal in the 73rd minute in a 5–0 away win against SV Drochtersen/Assel.

On 17 August 2019, he made his Bundesliga debut against Borussia Mönchengladbach as a late substitute, in an 0–0 away tie. On 22 August 2019, he signed his first professional contract with Schalke until June 2023.

=== Fatih Karagümrük ===
On 16 August 2021, he agreed to join Süper Lig club Fatih Karagümrük on a season-long loan. On 11 September 2021, he made his Süper Lig debut against Adana Demirspor in a late substitute as they won 4–0. On 1 December 2021, he made his Turkish Cup debut against Sarıyer in a 2–0 win.

On 5 July 2022, Mercan's move to Fatih Karagümrük was made permanent.

=== Fenerbahçe ===
On 21 June 2024, Mercan transferred to Fenerbahçe for an undisclosed fee on a 4-year deal. He made his first unofficial appearance in a friendly match against Romanian side, Petrolul Ploiești on 29 June 2024. He entered the game as a substitute, entering the game at the 46th minute replacing Luan Peres.

On 25 August 2024, he made his debut in a Süper Lig match against Rizespor in a 5–0 away win.

On 5 January 2025, he made his first appearance as a starter in a home match against Hatayspor as a left centre-back.

On 27 November 2025, he made his continental debut in a UEFA Europa League match against Ferencváros.

== International ==
Mercan began his youth international career with Germany, appeared for the under-19 and under-20 teams. On 16 April 2019, he made his international debut with Germany U19 against Denmark U19 in a friendly match, Germany lose 5–0. On 13 October 2019, he played with Germany U20 against Switzerland U20 (away win 1–0) and on 18 November 2019, he played against Portugal U20 (away win 2–0) in UEFA U20 Elite League matches.

== Style of play ==
Mercan is left-footed and continue his career as defender, usually as a left-sided full-back or wing-back but even he started his career as a number ten he is now deployed as a box-to-box center midfielder, or even on the left wing and at centre-back.

== Personal life ==
Born in Germany, Mercan is of Turkish descent.

== Career statistics ==
As of match played 8 November 2026

Appearances and goals by club, season and competition
Club	Season	League			National cup (Note: Includes DFB-Pokal, Turkish Cup)		Europe		Other		Total	
Club	Season	Division	Apps	Goals	Apps	Goals	Apps	Goals	Apps	Goals	Apps	Goals
Schalke 04 II	2018–19	Regionalliga West	27	6	–		–		–		27	6
Schalke 04 II	2019–20	Regionalliga West	5	0	–		–		–		5	0
Schalke 04 II	2020–21	Regionalliga West	10	1	–		–		–		10	1
Schalke 04 II	Total		42	7	–		–		–		42	7
Schalke 04	2019–20	Bundesliga	5	0	1	1	—		—		6	1
Schalke 04	2020–21	Bundesliga	1	0	0	0	—		—		1	0
Schalke 04	Total		6	0	1	1	—		—		7	1
Fatih Karagümrük (loan)	2021–22	Süper Lig	18	0	4	1	—		—		22	1
Fatih Karagümrük	2022–23	Süper Lig	29	2	3	0	—		—		32	2
Fatih Karagümrük	2023–24	Süper Lig	36	1	3	0	—		—		39	1
Fatih Karagümrük	Total		83	3	10	1	—		—		93	4
Fenerbahçe	2024–25	Süper Lig	11	0	2	0	0	0	—		13	0
Fenerbahçe	2025–26	Süper Lig	21	0	3	0	4 (Note: Appearances in UEFA Europa League)	0	2 (Note: Appearances in Turkish Super Cup)	0	30	0
Fenerbahçe	2026–27	Süper Lig	8	0	0	0	2 (Note: Appearances in UEFA Champions League)	0	0	0	10	0
Fenerbahçe	Total		40	0	5	0	6	0	2	0	53	0
Career total			171	4	16	2	6	0	2	0	195	8

== Honours ==
Fenerbahçe

- Turkish Super Cup: 2025
