= Ertuğrul Çetin =

Turkish footballer

Personal information
- Full name: Osman Ertuğrul Çetin
- Date of birth: 21 April 2003 (age 23)
- Place of birth: Istanbul, Turkey
- Height: 1.88 m (6 ft 2 in)
- Position: Goalkeeper

Team information
- Current team: Esenler Erokspor
- Number: 54

Youth career
- 2014–2020: Fenerbahçe U19

Senior career*
Years	Team	Apps	(Gls)
2020–2021	Altınordu	0	(0)
2021–2026	Fenerbahçe	4	(0)
2023–2024	→ Gençlerbirliği (loan)	20	(0)
2025	→ Esenler Erokspor (loan)	11	(0)
2026–	Esenler Erokspor	14	(0)

International career^{‡}
2017–2018	Turkey U-15	3	(0)
2018–2019	Turkey U-16	6	(0)
2019	Turkey U-17	5	(0)
2021–	Turkey U-19	5	(0)
- * Club domestic league appearances and goals as of 5 May 2026 ‡ National team caps and goals as of 16 November 2021

Osman Ertuğrul Çetin (born 21 April 2003) is a Turkish association footballer who plays as a goalkeeper for TFF 1. Lig club Esenler Erokspor,

== Career ==
=== Early career ===
Çetin started his career at Fenerbahçe Academy, in 2014. In October 2020, he was transferred to Altınordu. He never appeared in a competitive match for Altınordu.

=== Fenerbahçe ===
In January 2021, Çetin moved back to Fenerbahçe. He made his professional debut with Fenerbahçe in a 1–1 Süper Lig draw against Antalyaspor on 15 January 2022, at the age of 18.

On 4 August 2022, he made his continental debut in a UEFA Europa League third qualifying round first match, a 3–0 win over Slovácko.

==== Gençlerbirliği (loan) ====
On 3 July 2023, he was loaned out to Gençlerbirliği. On 13 August 2023, he made his debut with the team against Ümraniyespor in a 2-1 won TFF First League match. On 6 December 2023, he made his Turkish Cup debut against Bornova 1877 in a 4-1 won.

==== Esenler Erokspor (loan) ====
On 8 July 2025, he was loaned out to Esenler Erokspor. On 3 October 2025, he made his debut with the team against Boluspor in a 3-1 won TFF First League match.

On 13 November 2025, Çetin was banned from playing for 45 days for his involvement in the 2025 Turkish football betting scandal.

== Career statistics ==
As of 3 October 2025

Appearances and goals by club, season and competition
Club	Season	League			Cup		Europe		Other		Total	
Club	Season	Division	Apps	Goals	Apps	Goals	Apps	Goals	Apps	Goals	Apps	Goals
Fenerbahçe	2019–20	Süper Lig	0	0	0	0	—		10 (Note: Appearance(s) in U19 Ligi)	0	10	0
Altınordu	2020–21	TFF First League	0	0	0	0	—		13	0	13	0
Fenerbahçe	2021–22	Süper Lig	2	0	0	0	0	0	7 (Note: Appearance(s) in U21 Ligi)	0	9	0
Fenerbahçe	2022–23	Süper Lig	0	0	0	0	1 (Note: Appearance(s) in UEFA Europa League)	0	1 (Note: Appearance(s) in Rezerv Lig)	0	2	0
Fenerbahçe	2024–25	Süper Lig	2	0	2	0	0	0	0	0	4	0
Fenerbahçe	Total		4	0	2	0	1	0	18	0	25	0
Gençlerbirliği (loan)	2023–24	TFF First League	20	0	3	0	—		0	0	23	0
Esenler Erokspor (loan)	2025–26	TFF First League	1	0	0	0	—		0	0	1	0
Career total			25	0	4	0	1	0	31	0	61	0

== Honours ==
Fenerbahçe

- Turkish Cup: 2022–23
