= Emir Ortakaya =

Turkish footballer (born 2004)

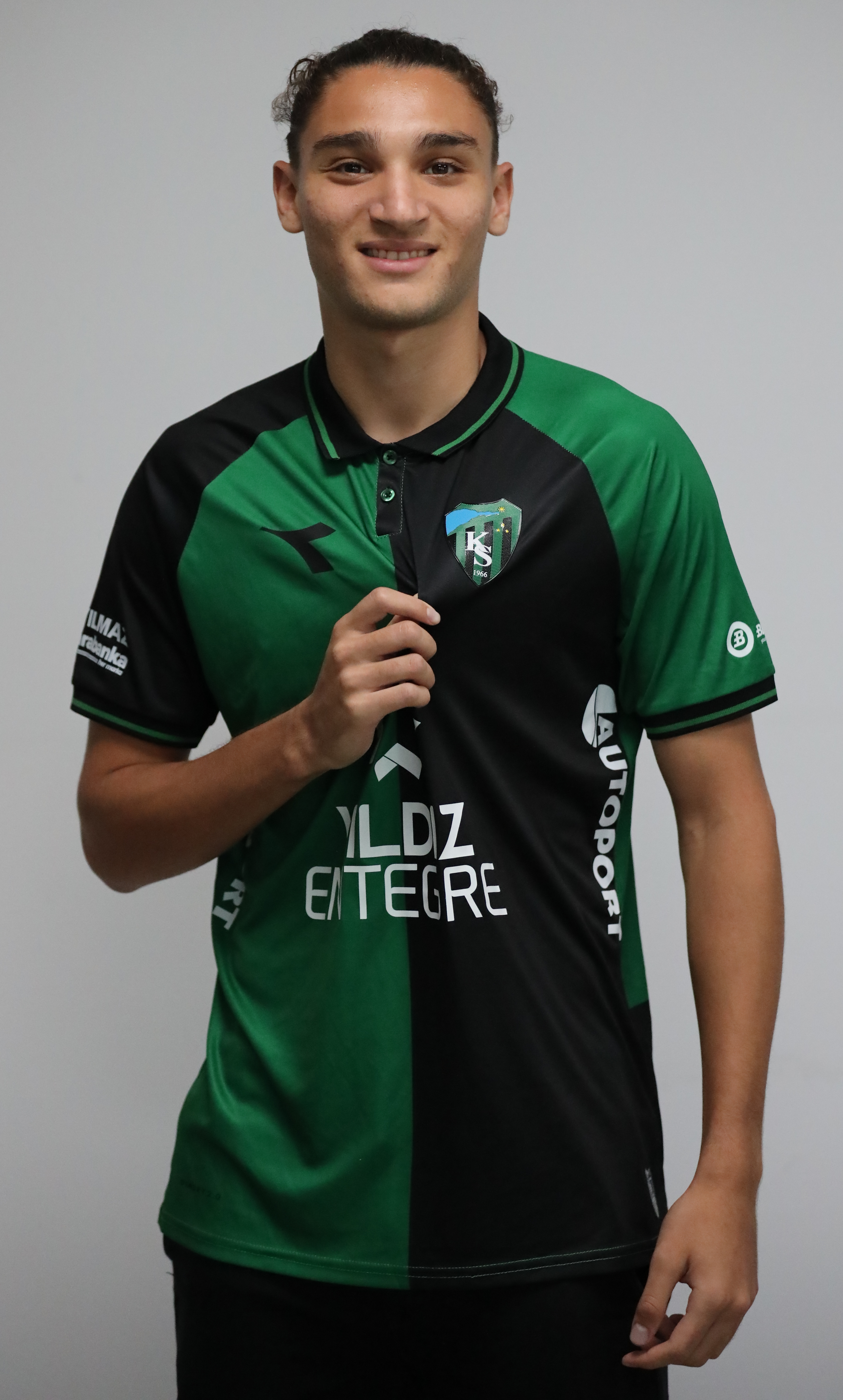
- Emir Ortakaya in 2023

Personal information
- Date of birth: 22 June 2004 (age 22)
- Place of birth: Ankara, Turkey
- Height: 1.85 m (6 ft 1 in)
- Position: Centre back

Team information
- Current team: Kocaelispor
- Number: 5

Youth career
- 2015–2021: Gençlerbirliği U19
- 2021–2022: Fenerbahçe U19

Senior career*
Years	Team	Apps	(Gls)
2020–2021	Gençlerbirliği	0	(0)
2022–2026	Fenerbahçe	0	(0)
2022–2023	→ Göztepe (loan)	31	(1)
2023–2024	→ Kocaelispor (loan)	31	(3)
2024	→ Westerlo (loan)	3	(0)
2025	→ Beerschot (loan)	0	(0)
2025–2026	→ Eyüpspor (loan)	9	(0)
2026	Çaykur Rizespor	3	(0)
2026–	Kocaelispor	5	(0)

International career^{‡}
2019	Turkey U15	4	(1)
2019–2020	Turkey U16	16	(2)
2021–2022	Turkey U18	9	(0)
2022	Turkey U19	2	(1)
2023–2025	Turkey U21	6	(1)
- * Club domestic league appearances and goals as of 11 October 2026 ‡ National team caps and goals as of 25 March 2025

Emir Ortakaya (born 22 June 2004) is a Turkish professional footballer who plays as a centre back for Turkish Süper Lig club Kocaelispor.

== Professional career ==
=== Gençlerbirliği ===
On 14 March 2021, he made his debut with Gençlerbirliği U19 against Fenerbahçe U19, Gençlerbirliği U19 won 1–0. He made his professional debut with Gençlerbirliği against Tuzlaspor in a Turkish Cup match, Gençlerbirliği lost 2–0.

=== Fenerbahçe ===
On 7 August 2021, he signed a three-year contract with the Turkish Süper Lig club Fenerbahçe. On 1 June 2024, he signed another three-year contract with the team.

==== Göztepe (loan) ====
On 3 August 2022, he renewed his contract until 30 June 2027 and loaned to Göztepe until the end of season. On 14 August 2022, he made his debut with the team against Sakaryaspor in TFF First League away game, Göztepe won 1–0.

==== Kocaelispor (loan) ====
On 25 August 2023, he loaned to Kocaelispor until the end of season. On 27 August 2023, he made his debut with the team against Altay in TFF First League home game, Göztepe won 3–2.

==== Westerlo (loan) ====
On 24 July 2024, Ortakaya joined Westerlo in Belgium on loan with an option to buy.

On 30 December 2024, after 3 league and 2 cup appearances with Westerlo, he terminated his contract and went back to Turkey.

==== Beerschot (loan) ====
On 22 January 2025, Ortakaya returned to Belgium and joined Beerschot on loan.

==== Eyüpspor (loan) ====
On 2 July 2025, Ortakaya joined Eyüpspor on loan until the end of 2025–26 season.

On 3 November 2025, he made his Süper Lig debut as a substitute against Antalyaspor. One week later on 11 November 2025, he made his starter debut with the team in a Süper Lig match against Samsunspor.

== Career statistics ==
As of matches played 20 December 2025

Appearances and goals by club, season and competition
Club	Season	League			National cup (Note: Includes Turkish Cup and Belgian Cup)		Europe		Other		Total	
Club	Season	Division	Apps	Goals	Apps	Goals	Apps	Goals	Apps	Goals	Apps	Goals
Gençlerbirliği	2020-21	Süper Lig	0	0	1	0	—		14 (Note: Appearances in U21 Ligi)	1	15	1
Fenerbahçe	2021-22	Süper Lig	0	0	0	0	0	0	28	3	28	3
Göztepe (loan)	2022–23	TFF First League	31	1	2	0	—		—		0	0
Kocaelispor (loan)	2023–24	TFF First League	31	3	0	0	—		—		0	0
Westerlo (loan)	2024–25	Belgian Pro League	3	0	2	0	—		—		5	0
Beerschot (loan)	2024–25	Belgian Pro League	0	0	0	0	—		—		0	0
Eyüpspor (loan)	2025–26	Süper Lig	7	0	0	0	—		—		7	0
Career total			72	4	5	0	0	0	42	4	119	8
