= 2024–25 UEFA Europa League knockout phase =

Europe premier club football tournament

The 2024–25 UEFA Europa League knockout phase began on 13 February with the knockout phase play-offs and ended on 21 May 2025 with the final at the San Mamés Stadium in Bilbao, Spain, to decide the champions of the 2024–25 UEFA Europa League. A total of 24 teams competed in the knockout phase, with 16 entering in the play-offs and 8 receiving a bye to the round of 16.

Times are CET/CEST, (Note: CET (UTC+1) for dates up to 29 March 2025 (knockout phase play-offs and round of 16), and CEST (UTC+2) for dates thereafter (quarter-finals, semi-finals and final).) as listed by UEFA (local times, if different, are in parentheses).

== Qualified teams ==
The knockout phase involved the top 24 teams that qualified from the league phase. The top 8 teams received a bye to the round of 16, while teams finishing in positions 9 to 24 entered the knockout phase play-offs.

Entering the round of 16 (seeded)
Pos	Team
1	(Italy) Lazio
2	(Spain) Athletic Bilbao
3	(England) Manchester United
4	(England) Tottenham Hotspur
5	(Germany) Eintracht Frankfurt
6	(France) Lyon
7	(Greece) Olympiacos
8	(Scotland) Rangers

Entering the play-offs (seeded)
Pos	Team
9	(Norway) Bodø/Glimt
10	(Belgium) Anderlecht
11	(Romania) FCSB
12	(Netherlands) Ajax
13	(Spain) Real Sociedad
14	(Turkey) Galatasaray
15	(Italy) Roma
16	(Czech Republic) Viktoria Plzeň

Entering the play-offs (unseeded)
Pos	Team
17	(Hungary) Ferencváros
18	(Portugal) Porto
19	(Netherlands) AZ
20	(Denmark) Midtjylland
21	(Belgium) Union Saint-Gilloise
22	(Greece) PAOK
23	(Netherlands) Twente
24	(Turkey) Fenerbahçe

== Format ==
Each tie in the knockout phase, apart from the final, was played over two legs, with each team playing one leg at home. The team that scored more goals on aggregate over the two legs advanced to the next round. If the aggregate score was level, then 30 minutes of extra time were played (the away goals rule was not applied). If the score was still level at the end of extra time, the winners were decided by a penalty shoot-out. In the final, which was played as a single match, if the score was level at the end of normal time, extra time would be played, followed by a penalty shoot-out if the score was still level.

=== Draw procedure ===
In the knockout phase, there was no country protection, with teams from the same association able to face each other in any round. Teams could also face opponents they played during the league phase.

The mechanism of the draws for each round was as follows:

- In the draw for the knockout phase play-offs, the eight teams finishing the league phase in positions 9–16 were seeded, and the eight teams finishing the league phase in positions 17–24 were unseeded. The draw was split into four sections based on the predetermined bracket, with the seeded teams in each section drawn against one of their two possible unseeded opponents. The seeded teams hosted the second leg.
- In the draw for the round of 16, the eight teams finishing the league phase in positions 1–8 were seeded, and the eight winners of the knockout phase play-offs were unseeded. Again, the draw was split into four sections based on the predetermined bracket, with the seeded teams in each section drawn against one of their two possible unseeded opponents. The seeded teams hosted the second leg.
- In the quarter-finals and semi-finals, the exact match pairings were predetermined based on the tournament bracket. A draw was conducted only to determine which team played the first leg at home. The winner of semi-final 1 was designated as the "home" team for the final (for administrative purposes as it was played at a neutral venue).

In the knockout phase, teams from the same or nearby cities were not scheduled to play at home on the same day or on consecutive days, due to logistics and crowd control. To avoid such scheduling conflict, several adjustments were made: For the knockout phase play-offs and the round of 16, if the two teams were drawn to play at home for the same leg, the home match of the team that had the lower league phase ranking was moved from Thursday from a regularly scheduled time to an earlier time slot, to a different day, and/or at an alternative venue without clashing any other competition. For the quarter-finals and semi-finals, the order of legs of the tie involving the team with the lowest priority was reversed from the original draw.

=== Predetermined pairings ===
The bracket structure for the knockout phase was partially fixed in advance using seeding, with a symmetrical pattern on both sides. Teams' positions in the bracket were determined by their final standings in the league phase, ensuring that higher-ranked teams face lower-ranked opponents in earlier rounds. As a result, certain sets of teams, such as the top two from the league phase, could not meet until the final.

The structure of each side of the bracket can be summarised as follows, with the exact pairings of the play-offs and round of 16 determined by a draw: (Note: The draws determined the exact play-off and round of 16 pairings for each side of the bracket, which mirrored each other. For example, if the team in 9th was drawn against 23rd in the play-offs, the team in 10th would be drawn against 24th on the other side of the bracket.)

- Knockout phase play-offs
  - Pairing I: 9/10 vs 23/24
  - Pairing II: 11/12 vs 21/22
  - Pairing III: 13/14 vs 19/20
  - Pairing IV: 15/16 vs 17/18
- Round of 16
  - Pairing A: 1/2 vs Winner IV
  - Pairing B: 3/4 vs Winner III
  - Pairing C: 5/6 vs Winner II
  - Pairing D: 7/8 vs Winner I
- Quarter-finals
  - Pairing 1: Winner A vs Winner D
  - Pairing 2: Winner B vs Winner C
- Semi-finals: Winner 1 vs Winner 2

== Schedule ==
The schedule was as follows (all draws were held at the UEFA headquarters in Nyon, Switzerland).

Round	Draw date	First leg	Second leg
Knockout phase play-offs	31 January 2025, 13:00 CET	13 February 2025	20 February 2025
Round of 16	21 February 2025, 13:00 CET	6 March 2025	13 March 2025
Quarter-finals	21 February 2025, 13:00 CET	10 April 2025	17 April 2025
Semi-finals	21 February 2025, 13:00 CET	1 May 2025	8 May 2025
Final	—N/a	21 May 2025 at San Mamés Stadium, Bilbao	

== Bracket ==
Knockout phase play-offs
19	(Netherlands) AZ	4	2	6
14	(Turkey) Galatasaray	1	2	3
21	(Belgium) Union Saint-Gilloise	0	2	2
12	(Netherlands) Ajax (a.e.t.)	2	1	3
23	(Netherlands) Twente	2	2	4
9	(Norway) Bodø/Glimt (a.e.t.)	1	5	6
17	(Hungary) Ferencváros	1	0	1
16	(Czech Republic) Viktoria Plzeň	0	3	3
24	(Turkey) Fenerbahçe	3	2	5
10	(Belgium) Anderlecht	0	2	2
18	(Portugal) Porto	1	2	3
15	(Italy) Roma	1	3	4
22	(Greece) PAOK	1	0	1
11	(Romania) FCSB	2	2	4
20	(Denmark) Midtjylland	1	2	3
13	(Spain) Real Sociedad	2	5	7

Round of 16
19	(Netherlands) AZ	1	1	2
4	(England) Tottenham Hotspur	0	3	3
12	(Netherlands) Ajax	1	1	2
5	(Germany) Eintracht Frankfurt	2	4	6
9	(Norway) Bodø/Glimt	3	1	4
7	(Greece) Olympiacos	0	2	2
16	(Czech Republic) Viktoria Plzeň	1	1	2
1	(Italy) Lazio	2	1	3
24	(Turkey) Fenerbahçe	1	2	3 (2)
8	(Scotland) Rangers (p)	3	0	3 (3)
15	(Italy) Roma	2	1	3
2	(Spain) Athletic Bilbao	1	3	4
11	(Romania) FCSB	1	0	1
6	(France) Lyon	3	4	7
13	(Spain) Real Sociedad	1	1	2
3	(England) Manchester United	1	4	5

Quarter-finals
4	(England) Tottenham Hotspur	1	1	2
5	(Germany) Eintracht Frankfurt	1	0	1
9	(Norway) Bodø/Glimt (p)	2	1	3 (3)
1	(Italy) Lazio	0	3	3 (2)
8	(Scotland) Rangers	0	0	0
2	(Spain) Athletic Bilbao	0	2	2
6	(France) Lyon	2	4	6
3	(England) Manchester United (a.e.t.)	2	5	7

Semi-finals
4	(England) Tottenham Hotspur	3	2	5
9	(Norway) Bodø/Glimt	1	0	1
2	(Spain) Athletic Bilbao	0	1	1
3	(England) Manchester United	3	4	7

Final
21 May – Bilbao
4	(England) Tottenham Hotspur	1
3	(England) Manchester United	0

== Knockout phase play-offs ==
The draw for the knockout phase play-offs was held on 31 January 2025, 13:00 CET.

=== Seeding ===
The draw was split into four seeded and four unseeded pots, based on the predetermined pairings for the knockout phase. Teams were allocated based on their final position in the league phase. Teams in positions 9 to 16 were seeded (playing the second legs at home), while teams in positions 17 to 24 were unseeded. The draw began with the unseeded teams, allocating them all to a tie. Once completed, all the seeded teams were drawn into a tie as their opponents.

9/10 vs 23/24		11/12 vs 21/22	
Seeded	Unseeded	Seeded	Unseeded
(Norway) Bodø/Glimt; (Belgium) Anderlecht	(Netherlands) Twente; (Turkey) Fenerbahçe	(Romania) FCSB; (Netherlands) Ajax	(Belgium) Union Saint-Gilloise; (Greece) PAOK

13/14 vs 19/20		15/16 vs 17/18	
Seeded	Unseeded	Seeded	Unseeded
(Spain) Real Sociedad; (Turkey) Galatasaray	(Netherlands) AZ; (Denmark) Midtjylland	(Italy) Roma; (Czech Republic) Viktoria Plzeň	(Hungary) Ferencváros; (Portugal) Porto

=== Summary ===
The first legs were played on 13 February, and the second legs were played on 20 February 2025.

Team 1	Agg.	Team 2	1st leg	2nd leg
Ferencváros (Hungary)	1–3	(Czech Republic) Viktoria Plzeň	1–0	0–3
Twente (Netherlands)	4–6	(Norway) Bodø/Glimt	2–1	2–5 (a.e.t.)
Union Saint-Gilloise (Belgium)	2–3	(Netherlands) Ajax	0–2	2–1 (a.e.t.)
AZ (Netherlands)	6–3	(Turkey) Galatasaray	4–1	2–2
Porto (Portugal)	3–4	(Italy) Roma	1–1	2–3
Fenerbahçe (Turkey)	5–2	(Belgium) Anderlecht	3–0	2–2
PAOK (Greece)	1–4	(Romania) FCSB	1–2	0–2
Midtjylland (Denmark)	3–7	(Spain) Real Sociedad	1–2	2–5

=== Matches ===
13 February 2025
18:45

Ferencváros (Hungary)	1–0	(Czech Republic) Viktoria Plzeň
Abu Fani 23'	Report

Ferencváros Stadion, Budapest
Attendance: 18,519
Referee: Giorgi Kruashvili (Georgia)
20 February 2025
21:00

Viktoria Plzeň (Czech Republic)	3–0	(Hungary) Ferencváros
Jemelka 27'; Šulc 35'; Durosinmi 38'	Report

Doosan Arena, Plzeň
Attendance: 10,415
Referee: Jérôme Brisard (France)

Viktoria Plzeň won 3–1 on aggregate.

13 February 2025
21:00

Twente (Netherlands)	2–1	(Norway) Bodø/Glimt
Ltaief 5'; Van Wolfswinkel 90+5' (pen.)	Report	Berg 85'

De Grolsch Veste, Enschede
Attendance: 29,500
Referee: Sebastian Gishamer (Austria)
20 February 2025
18:45

Bodø/Glimt (Norway)	5–2 (a.e.t.)	(Netherlands) Twente
Høgh 56' (pen.); Hilgers 90+2' (o.g.); Wembangomo 90+4'; Fet 111'; Verschueren 114' (o.g.)	Report	Sjøvold 26' (o.g.); Steijn 90+6'

Aspmyra Stadion, Bodø
Attendance: 6,417
Referee: Alejandro Hernández Hernández (Spain)

Bodø/Glimt won 6–4 on aggregate.

13 February 2025
18:45

Union Saint-Gilloise (Belgium)	0–2	(Netherlands) Ajax
	Report	Rasmussen 59'; Mokio 71'

King Baudouin Stadium, Brussels (Note: Union Saint-Gilloise played their home match at King Baudouin Stadium, Brussels, instead of their regular stadium, Joseph Marien Stadium, Brussels, which did not meet UEFA requirements.)
Attendance: 10,853
Referee: Donatas Rumšas (Lithuania)
20 February 2025
21:00

Ajax (Netherlands)	1–2 (a.e.t.)	(Belgium) Union Saint-Gilloise
Taylor 93' (pen.)	Report	Mac Allister 16'; David 28' (pen.)

Johan Cruyff Arena, Amsterdam
Attendance: 51,835
Referee: Chris Kavanagh (England)

Ajax won 3–2 on aggregate.

13 February 2025
21:00

AZ (Netherlands)	4–1	(Turkey) Galatasaray
Mijnans 12'; Parrott 37' (pen.); Clasie 57'; Wolfe 66'	Report	Sallai 20'

AFAS Stadion, Alkmaar
Attendance: 14,092
Referee: João Pinheiro (Portugal)
20 February 2025
18:45 (20:45 UTC+3)

Galatasaray (Turkey)	2–2	(Netherlands) AZ
Osimhen 56'; Sallai 70'	Report	Maikuma 42'; Kasius 55'

Rams Park, Istanbul
Attendance: 37,343
Referee: Anthony Taylor (England)

AZ won 6–3 on aggregate.

13 February 2025
21:00 (20:00 UTC+0)

Porto (Portugal)	1–1	(Italy) Roma
Moura 67'	Report	Çelik 45+5'

Estádio do Dragão, Porto
Attendance: 37,129
Referee: Tobias Stieler (Germany)
20 February 2025
18:45

Roma (Italy)	3–2	(Portugal) Porto
Dybala 35', 39'; Pisilli 83'	Report	Aghehowa 27'; Rensch 90+6' (o.g.)

Stadio Olimpico, Rome
Attendance: 55,286
Referee: François Letexier (France)

Roma won 4–3 on aggregate.

13 February 2025
18:45 (20:45 UTC+3)

Fenerbahçe (Turkey)	3–0	(Belgium) Anderlecht
Tadić 11'; Džeko 42'; En-Nesyri 57'	Report

Şükrü Saracoğlu Stadium, Istanbul
Attendance: 34,517
Referee: Nikola Dabanović (Montenegro)
20 February 2025
21:00

Anderlecht (Belgium)	2–2	(Turkey) Fenerbahçe
Vázquez 19', 55'	Report	En-Nesyri 4'; Akçiçek 63'

Constant Vanden Stock Stadium, Brussels
Attendance: 13,724
Referee: Sandro Schärer (Switzerland)

Fenerbahçe won 5–2 on aggregate.

13 February 2025
21:00 (22:00 UTC+2)

PAOK (Greece)	1–2	(Romania) FCSB
Samatta 21'	Report	Gheorghiță 50'; Dawa 60'

Toumba Stadium, Thessaloniki
Attendance: 18,343
Referee: Lawrence Visser (Belgium)
20 February 2025
18:45 (19:45 UTC+2)

FCSB (Romania)	2–0	(Greece) PAOK
Cisotti 30'; Miculescu 81'	Report

Arena Națională, Bucharest
Attendance: 50,248
Referee: Matej Jug (Slovenia)

FCSB won 4–1 on aggregate.

13 February 2025
18:45

Midtjylland (Denmark)	1–2	(Spain) Real Sociedad
Buksa 38'	Report	Méndez 11' (pen.); Kubo 31'

MCH Arena, Herning
Attendance: 9,401
Referee: Orel Grinfeld (Israel)
20 February 2025
21:00

Real Sociedad (Spain)	5–2	(Denmark) Midtjylland
Méndez 5'; Sučić 18', 45+2'; Oyarzabal 73' (pen.); Óskarsson 90'	Report	Buksa 24' (pen.); Osorio 38'

Anoeta, San Sebastián
Attendance: 27,728
Referee: Serdar Gözübüyük (Netherlands)

Real Sociedad won 7–3 on aggregate.

== Round of 16 ==
The draw for the round of 16 was held on 21 February 2025, 13:00 CET.

=== Seeding ===
As the bracket was fixed, the draw contained only four seeded pots, based on the predetermined pairings for the knockout phase, with the top-eight teams allocated based on their final position in the league phase. Teams in positions 1 to 8 were seeded (playing the second legs at home), while the bracket positions of the winners of the knockout phase play-offs (unseeded) were predetermined. The top-eight teams were drawn into the bracket against one of their two possible opponents.

1/2 vs 15/16/17/18		3/4 vs 13/14/19/20	
Seeded	Predetermined	Seeded	Predetermined
(Italy) Lazio; (Spain) Athletic Bilbao	(Czech Republic) Viktoria Plzeň; (Italy) Roma	(England) Manchester United; (England) Tottenham Hotspur	(Netherlands) AZ; (Spain) Real Sociedad

5/6 vs 11/12/21/22		7/8 vs 9/10/23/24	
Seeded	Predetermined	Seeded	Predetermined
(Germany) Eintracht Frankfurt; (France) Lyon	(Netherlands) Ajax; (Romania) FCSB	(Greece) Olympiacos; (Scotland) Rangers	(Norway) Bodø/Glimt; (Turkey) Fenerbahçe

=== Summary ===
The first legs were played on 6 March, and the second legs were played on 13 March 2025.

Team 1	Agg.	Team 2	1st leg	2nd leg
Viktoria Plzeň (Czech Republic)	2–3	(Italy) Lazio	1–2	1–1
Bodø/Glimt (Norway)	4–2	(Greece) Olympiacos	3–0	1–2
Ajax (Netherlands)	2–6	(Germany) Eintracht Frankfurt	1–2	1–4
AZ (Netherlands)	2–3	(England) Tottenham Hotspur	1–0	1–3
Roma (Italy)	3–4	(Spain) Athletic Bilbao	2–1	1–3
Fenerbahçe (Turkey)	3–3 (2–3 p)	(Scotland) Rangers	1–3	2–0 (a.e.t.)
FCSB (Romania)	1–7	(France) Lyon	1–3	0–4
Real Sociedad (Spain)	2–5	(England) Manchester United	1–1	1–4

=== Matches ===
6 March 2025
21:00

Viktoria Plzeň (Czech Republic)	1–2	(Italy) Lazio
Durosinmi 53'	Report	Romagnoli 18'; Isaksen 90+8'

Doosan Arena, Plzeň
Attendance: 11,236
Referee: Donatas Rumšas (Lithuania)
13 March 2025
18:45

Lazio (Italy)	1–1	(Czech Republic) Viktoria Plzeň
Romagnoli 77'	Report	Šulc 52'

Stadio Olimpico, Rome
Attendance: 39,547
Referee: Danny Makkelie (Netherlands)

Lazio won 3–2 on aggregate.

6 March 2025
21:00

Bodø/Glimt (Norway)	3–0	(Greece) Olympiacos
Tzolakis 13' (o.g.); Høgh 45', 55'	Report

Aspmyra Stadion, Bodø
Attendance: 8,050
Referee: Mykola Balakin (Ukraine)
13 March 2025
18:45 (19:45 UTC+2)

Olympiacos (Greece)	2–1	(Norway) Bodø/Glimt
Yaremchuk 53', 65'	Report	Høgh 36'

Karaiskakis Stadium, Piraeus
Attendance: 31,850
Referee: Felix Zwayer (Germany)

Bodø/Glimt won 4–2 on aggregate.

6 March 2025
21:00

Ajax (Netherlands)	1–2	(Germany) Eintracht Frankfurt
Brobbey 10'	Report	Larsson 27'; Skhiri 70'

Johan Cruyff Arena, Amsterdam
Attendance: 52,641
Referee: Simone Sozza (Italy)
13 March 2025
18:45

Eintracht Frankfurt (Germany)	4–1	(Netherlands) Ajax
Bahoya 7'; Götze 25', 82'; Ekitike 67'	Report	Taylor 78'

Waldstadion, Frankfurt
Attendance: 57,500
Referee: Irfan Peljto (Bosnia and Herzegovina)

Eintracht Frankfurt won 6–2 on aggregate.

6 March 2025
18:45

AZ (Netherlands)	1–0	(England) Tottenham Hotspur
Bergvall 18' (o.g.)	Report

AFAS Stadion, Alkmaar
Attendance: 18,281
Referee: Rade Obrenovič (Slovenia)
13 March 2025
21:00 (20:00 UTC+0)

Tottenham Hotspur (England)	3–1	(Netherlands) AZ
Odobert 26', 74'; Maddison 48'	Report	Koopmeiners 63'

Tottenham Hotspur Stadium, London
Attendance: 58,302
Referee: João Pinheiro (Portugal)

Tottenham Hotspur won 3–2 on aggregate.

6 March 2025
21:00

Roma (Italy)	2–1	(Spain) Athletic Bilbao
Angeliño 56'; Shomurodov 90+3'	Report	I. Williams 50'

Stadio Olimpico, Rome
Attendance: 62,540
Referee: Sandro Schärer (Switzerland)
13 March 2025
18:45

Athletic Bilbao (Spain)	3–1	(Italy) Roma
N. Williams 45+3', 82'; Berchiche 68'	Report	Paredes 90+3' (pen.)

San Mamés, Bilbao
Attendance: 50,666
Referee: Clément Turpin (France)

Athletic Bilbao won 4–3 on aggregate.

6 March 2025
18:45 (20:45 UTC+3)

Fenerbahçe (Turkey)	1–3	(Scotland) Rangers
Djiku 30'	Report	Dessers 7'; Černý 42', 81'

Şükrü Saracoğlu Stadium, Istanbul
Attendance: 42,090
Referee: Alejandro Hernández Hernández (Spain)
13 March 2025
21:00 (20:00 UTC+0)

Rangers (Scotland)	0–2 (a.e.t.)	(Turkey) Fenerbahçe
	Report	Szymański 45', 73'
Penalties
Tavernier (penalty scored); Černý (penalty scored); Hagi (penalty missed); Lawrence (penalty scored)	3–2	(penalty missed) Tadić; (penalty scored) Džeko; (penalty scored) Djiku; (penalty missed) Fred; (penalty missed) Yandaş

Ibrox Stadium, Glasgow
Attendance: 50,061
Referee: Espen Eskås (Norway)

3–3 on aggregate; Rangers won 3–2 on penalties.

6 March 2025
18:45 (19:45 UTC+2)

FCSB (Romania)	1–3	(France) Lyon
Băluță 68'	Report	Tagliafico 30'; Fofana 86', 89'

Arena Națională, Bucharest
Attendance: 53,028
Referee: Tobias Stieler (Germany)
13 March 2025
21:00

Lyon (France)	4–0	(Romania) FCSB
Mikautadze 14', 47'; Nuamah 37', 88'	Report

Parc Olympique Lyonnais, Décines-Charpieu
Attendance: 37,322
Referee: Anthony Taylor (England)

Lyon won 7–1 on aggregate.

6 March 2025
18:45

Real Sociedad (Spain)	1–1	(England) Manchester United
Oyarzabal 70' (pen.)	Report	Zirkzee 57'

Anoeta, San Sebastián
Attendance: 34,391
Referee: Ivan Kružliak (Slovakia)
13 March 2025
21:00 (20:00 UTC+0)

Manchester United (England)	4–1	(Spain) Real Sociedad
Fernandes 16' (pen.), 50' (pen.), 87'; Dalot 90+1'	Report	Oyarzabal 10' (pen.)

Old Trafford, Manchester
Attendance: 73,189
Referee: Benoît Bastien (France)

Manchester United won 5–2 on aggregate.

== Quarter-finals ==
The draw for the order of the quarter-final legs was held on 21 February 2025, 13:00 CET, after the round of 16 draw.

=== Summary ===
The first legs were played on 10 April, and the second legs were played on 17 April 2025.

Team 1	Agg.	Team 2	1st leg	2nd leg
Bodø/Glimt (Norway)	3–3 (3–2 p)	(Italy) Lazio	2–0	1–3 (a.e.t.)
Tottenham Hotspur (England)	2–1	(Germany) Eintracht Frankfurt	1–1	1–0
Rangers (Scotland)	0–2	(Spain) Athletic Bilbao	0–0	0–2
Lyon (France)	6–7	(England) Manchester United	2–2	4–5 (a.e.t.)

=== Matches ===
10 April 2025
18:45

Bodø/Glimt (Norway)	2–0	(Italy) Lazio
Saltnes 47', 69'	Report

Aspmyra Stadion, Bodø
Attendance: 8,124
Referee: Michael Oliver (England)
17 April 2025
21:00

Lazio (Italy)	3–1 (a.e.t.)	(Norway) Bodø/Glimt
Castellanos 21'; Noslin 90+3'; Dia 100'	Report	Helmersen 109'
Penalties
Dia (penalty scored); Tchaouna (penalty missed); Noslin (penalty missed); Guendouzi (penalty scored); Castellanos (penalty missed)	2–3	(penalty missed) Hauge; (penalty scored) Fet; (penalty scored) Sørli; (penalty scored) Moe; (penalty missed) Berg

Stadio Olimpico, Rome
Attendance: 54,873
Referee: Daniel Siebert (Germany)

3–3 on aggregate; Bodø/Glimt won 3–2 on penalties.

10 April 2025
21:00 (20:00 UTC+0)

Tottenham Hotspur (England)	1–1	(Germany) Eintracht Frankfurt
Porro 26'	Report	Ekitike 6'

Tottenham Hotspur Stadium, London
Attendance: 57,849
Referee: Szymon Marciniak (Poland)
17 April 2025
21:00

Eintracht Frankfurt (Germany)	0–1	(England) Tottenham Hotspur
	Report	Solanke 43' (pen.)

Waldstadion, Frankfurt
Attendance: 57,500
Referee: Davide Massa (Italy)

Tottenham Hotspur won 2–1 on aggregate.

10 April 2025
21:00 (20:00 UTC+0)

Rangers (Scotland)	0–0	(Spain) Athletic Bilbao
	Report

Ibrox Stadium, Glasgow
Attendance: 49,922
Referee: István Kovács (Romania)
17 April 2025
21:00

Athletic Bilbao (Spain)	2–0	(Scotland) Rangers
Sancet 45+4' (pen.); N. Williams 80'	Report

San Mamés, Bilbao
Attendance: 52,114
Referee: Irfan Peljto (Bosnia and Herzegovina)

Athletic Bilbao won 2–0 on aggregate.

10 April 2025
21:00

Lyon (France)	2–2	(England) Manchester United
Almada 26'; Cherki 90+5'	Report	Yoro 45+5'; Zirkzee 88'

Parc Olympique Lyonnais, Décines-Charpieu
Attendance: 58,018
Referee: Glenn Nyberg (Sweden)
17 April 2025
21:00 (20:00 UTC+0)

Manchester United (England)	5–4 (a.e.t.)	(France) Lyon
Ugarte 10'; Dalot 45+1'; Fernandes 114' (pen.); Mainoo 120'; Maguire 120+1'	Report	Tolisso 71'; Tagliafico 78'; Cherki 105'; Lacazette 110' (pen.)

Old Trafford, Manchester
Attendance: 73,228
Referee: Sandro Schärer (Switzerland)

Manchester United won 7–6 on aggregate.

== Semi-finals ==
The draw for the order of the semi-final legs was held on 21 February 2025, 13:00 CET, after the round of 16 and quarter-final draws.

=== Summary ===
The first legs were played on 1 May, and the second legs were played on 8 May 2025.

Team 1	Agg.	Team 2	1st leg	2nd leg
Tottenham Hotspur (England)	5–1	(Norway) Bodø/Glimt	3–1	2–0
Athletic Bilbao (Spain)	1–7	(England) Manchester United	0–3	1–4

=== Matches ===
1 May 2025
21:00 (20:00 UTC+0)

Tottenham Hotspur (England)	3–1	(Norway) Bodø/Glimt
Johnson 1'; Maddison 34'; Solanke 61' (pen.)	Report	Saltnes 83'

Tottenham Hotspur Stadium, London
Attendance: 61,327
Referee: José María Sánchez Martínez (Spain)
8 May 2025
21:00

Bodø/Glimt (Norway)	0–2	(England) Tottenham Hotspur
	Report	Solanke 63'; Porro 69'

Aspmyra Stadion, Bodø
Attendance: 8,030
Referee: Maurizio Mariani (Italy)

Tottenham Hotspur won 5–1 on aggregate.

1 May 2025
21:00

Athletic Bilbao (Spain)	0–3	(England) Manchester United
	Report	Casemiro 30'; Fernandes 37' (pen.), 45'

San Mamés, Bilbao
Attendance: 51,980
Referee: Espen Eskås (Norway)
8 May 2025
21:00 (20:00 UTC+0)

Manchester United (England)	4–1	(Spain) Athletic Bilbao
Mount 72', 90+1'; Casemiro 80'; Højlund 85'	Report	Jauregizar 31'

Old Trafford, Manchester
Attendance: 73,298
Referee: Daniel Siebert (Germany)

Manchester United won 7–1 on aggregate.

== Final ==
The final was played on 21 May 2025 at the San Mamés Stadium in Bilbao. The winner of semi-final 1 was designated as the "home" team for administrative purposes.

21 May 2025
21:00

Tottenham Hotspur (The Football Association)	1–0	(The Football Association) Manchester United
Johnson 42'	Report

San Mamés, Bilbao
Attendance: 49,224
Referee: Felix Zwayer (Germany)
