= 2021–22 Fenerbahçe S.K. season =

Fenerbahçe
2021–22 season
- President: Ali Koç
- Head coach: Vítor Pereira (until 20 December 2021); İsmail Kartal (from 12 January 2022)
- Stadium: Şükrü Saracoğlu Stadium
- Süper Lig: 2nd
- Turkish Cup: Round of 16
- UEFA Europa League: Group stage
- UEFA Europa Conference League: Knockout round play-offs
- Top goalscorer: League: Serdar Dursun (15); All: Serdar Dursun (15)
- Highest home attendance: 43,878 (vs. Galatasaray, 10 April 2022, Süper Lig)
- Lowest home attendance: 6,769 (vs. HJK, 19 August 2021, UEFA Europa League)
- Average home league attendance: 24,722
- Biggest win: 6–0 (vs. Çaykur Rizespor (A), 22 April 2022, Süper Lig)
- Biggest defeat: 0–3 (vs. Olympiacos (H), 30 September 2021, UEFA Europa League)
Home colours	Away colours	Third colours

The 2021–22 season was the 115th season in the existence of Fenerbahçe S.K. and the club's 64th consecutive season in the top flight of Turkish football. In addition to the domestic league, Fenerbahçe participated in this season's editions of the Turkish Cup, the UEFA Europa League and the UEFA Europa Conference League.

== Kits ==
Fenerbahçe's 2021–22 kits, manufactured by Puma, released on 9 July 2021 and were up for sale on the same day.

- Supplier: Puma
- Main sponsor: Avis
- Back sponsor: Halley
- Sleeve sponsor: Nesine.com
- Short sponsor: Aygaz
- Socks sponsor: Floki Inu

Home
Home alt.
Away
Third
Goalkeeper 1
Goalkeeper 2
Goalkeeper 3

=== Training ===
Players	Staff

== Players ==
=== First-team squad ===
N	Pos.	Nat.	Name	Age	EU	Since	App	Goals	Ends	Transfer fee	Notes
1	GK	(Turkey)	Altay Bayındır	24	Non-EU	2019	101	0	2023	€1.50M	
3	DF	(South Korea)	Kim Min-jae	25	Non-EU	2021	40	2	2025	€3.00M	
4	DF	(Turkey)	Serdar Aziz	31	Non-EU	2019 (Winter)	93	10	2022	Free	
5	MF	(Argentina)	José Sosa	36	Non-EU	2020	63	4	2022	Free	
7	MF	(Turkey)	Ozan Tufan	26	Non-EU	2015	182	21	2023	€7.00M	
8	MF	(Turkey)	Mert Hakan Yandaş	27	Non-EU	2020	71	6	2024	Free	
9	FW	(Uruguay)	Diego Rossi	24	EU	2021	39	6	2022	Loan	Second nationality: Italian
10	MF	(Germany)	Mesut Özil (Captain)	33	EU	2021 (Winter)	37	9	2024	Free	Second nationality: Turkish
11	FW	(Germany)	Mërgim Berisha	24	EU	2021	31	7	2025	Undisclosed	Second nationality: Kosovan
13	FW	(Ecuador)	Enner Valencia	32	Non-EU	2020	68	26	2023	Free	
14	MF	(Greece)	Dimitrios Pelkas	28	EU	2020	67	13	2023	€1.60M	
16	MF	(Turkey)	Ferdi Kadıoğlu	22	EU	2018	100	10	2022	€1.40M	Other nationalities: Dutch, Canadian
17	MF	(Turkey)	İrfan Kahveci	26	Non-EU	2021 (Winter)	41	4	2025	€7.00M	
19	FW	(Turkey)	Serdar Dursun	30	EU	2021	37	15	2024	Free	Second nationality: German
20	MF	(Brazil)	Luiz Gustavo (Vice-Captain)	34	Non-EU	2019	97	5	2023	€6.00M	
21	MF	(Nigeria)	Bright Osayi-Samuel	24	Non-EU	2021 (Winter)	62	3	2025	Undisclosed	Second nationality: English
25	MF	(Turkey)	Arda Güler	17	Non-EU	2021	16	3	2023	Youth system	
26	MF	(Slovenia)	Miha Zajc	27	EU	2019 (Winter)	68	13	2023	€3.50M	
27	MF	(Portugal)	Miguel Crespo	26	EU	2021	24	1	2024	Undisclosed	Second nationality: French
30	DF	(Turkey)	Nazım Sangaré	27	EU	2020	50	2	2024	€1.75M	Other nationalities: German, Guinean
32	DF	(Democratic Republic of the Congo)	Marcel Tisserand	29	EU	2020	52	1	2023	€4.00M	Second nationality: French
33	DF	(Turkey)	Çağtay Kurukalıp	20	Non-EU	2021	2	0	2024	Undisclosed	
35	GK	(Turkey)	Berke Özer	21	Non-EU	2018	20	0	2023	€2.50M	
37	DF	(Czech Republic)	Filip Novák	31	EU	2020	47	4	2023	Free	
41	DF	(Hungary)	Attila Szalai	24	EU	2021 (Winter)	65	4	2025	€2.00M	
54	GK	(Turkey)	Ertuğrul Çetin	19	Non-EU	2021	2	0	2023	Youth system	
59	GK	(Turkey)	Bartu Kulbilge	18	Non-EU	2021	0	0	2023	Youth system	
77	MF	(Turkey)	Burak Kapacak	22	Non-EU	2021	7	0	2026	€1.35M	
91	FW	(Turkey)	Melih Bostan	18	Non-EU	2021	0	0	2022	Youth system	
99	FW	(North Macedonia)	Arda Okan Kurtulan	19	Non-EU	2021	1	0	2024	Youth system	Second nationality: Turkish

- Last updated: 21 May 2022
- Source: Fenerbahce.org
- Ordered by squad number.

== Transfers ==
=== In ===
No.	Pos.	Nat.	Name	Age	Moving from	Type	Transfer window	Ends	Transfer fee	Source
26	MF	(Slovenia)	Miha Zajc	26	(Italy) Genoa	End of loan	Summer	2023	Free	
66	MF	(Turkey)	Oğuz Kağan Güçtekin	22	Konyaspor	End of loan	Summer	2022	Free	
	FW	(Switzerland)	Michael Frey	26	(Belgium) Waasland-Beveren	End of loan	Summer	2022	Free	
	DF	(Turkey)	Murat Sağlam	23	Çaykur Rizespor	End of loan	Summer	2022	Free	
	MF	(Turkey)	İsmail Yüksek	22	Adana Demirspor	End of loan	Summer	2025	Free	
	MF	(Turkey)	Deniz Türüç	28	İstanbul Başakşehir	End of loan	Summer	2022	Free	
6	DF	(Denmark)	Zanka	31	(Denmark) Copenhagen	End of loan	Summer	2022	Free	
	MF	(Turkey)	Serhat Ahmetoğlu	19	Fatih Karagümrük	End of loan	Summer	2023	Free	
2	MF	(Morocco)	Nabil Dirar	35	(Belgium) Club Brugge	End of loan	Summer	2022	Free	
99	FW	(Switzerland)	Kemal Ademi	25	Fatih Karagümrük	End of loan	Summer	2023	Free	
35	GK	(Turkey)	Berke Özer	21	(Belgium) Westerlo	End of loan	Summer	2022	Free	
	MF	(Turkey)	Barış Alıcı	24	(Belgium) Westerlo	End of loan	Summer	2022	Free	
15	FW	(Tanzania)	Mbwana Samatta	28	(England) Aston Villa	Transfer	Summer	2024	Free^{1}	
19	FW	(Turkey)	Serdar Dursun	29	(Germany) Darmstadt 98	End of contract	Summer	2024	Free	
44	DF	(Sierra Leone)	Steven Caulker	29	Alanyaspor	End of contract	Summer	2023	Free	
33	DF	(Turkey)	Çağtay Kurukalıp	19	Kasımpaşa	End of contract	Summer	2024	Free	
77	MF	(Turkey)	Burak Kapacak	21	Bursaspor	Transfer	Summer	2026	€1.35M	
3	DF	(South Korea)	Kim Min-jae	24	(China) Beijing Guoan	Transfer	Summer	2025	€3.00M	
9	FW	(Uruguay)	Diego Rossi	23	(United States) Los Angeles FC	Loan	Summer	2022	Free	
11	FW	(Germany)	Mërgim Berisha	23	(Austria) Red Bull Salzburg	Transfer	Summer	2025	Undisclosed	
6	MF	(Germany)	Max Meyer	25	(Germany) 1. FC Köln	Transfer	Summer	2023	Free	
27	MF	(Portugal)	Miguel Crespo	24	(Portugal) Estoril	Transfer	Summer	2024	Undisclosed	
	FW	(Iran)	Allahyar Sayyadmanesh	20	(Ukraine) Zorya Luhansk	End of loan	Winter	2024	Free	
7	MF	(Turkey)	Ozan Tufan	26	(England) Watford	End of loan	Winter	2023	Free	

Notes:

^1 In the 2020–21 season, Samatta joined Fenerbahçe for €6M on an initial loan deal until the end of the season.

=== Out ===
No.	Pos.	Nat.	Name	Age	Moving to	Type	Transfer window	Transfer fee	Source
48	GK	(Turkey)	Oytun Özdoğan	23	Yeni Malatyaspor	End of contract	Summer	Free	
9	FW	(Senegal)	Papiss Cissé	36		End of contract	Summer	Free	
30	MF	(Turkey)	Ömer Faruk Beyaz	17	(Germany) VfB Stuttgart	End of contract	Summer	Free	
22	FW	(Switzerland)	Michael Frey	26	(Belgium) Royal Antwerp	Transfer	Summer	Undisclosed	
35	GK	(Turkey)	Harun Tekin	32	Kasımpaşa	End of contract	Summer	Free	
77	DF	(Turkey)	Gökhan Gönül	36	Çaykur Rizespor	End of contract	Summer	Free	
	MF	(Turkey)	Deniz Türüç	28	İstanbul Başakşehir	Transfer	Summer	Free	
	MF	(Turkey)	Barış Alıcı	24	Gençlerbirliği	Transfer	Summer	Free	
99	FW	(Switzerland)	Kemal Ademi	25	(Russia) Khimki	Transfer	Summer	€0.80M	
18	DF	(Turkey)	Sadık Çiftpınar	28	Yeni Malatyaspor	Transfer	Summer	Free	
7	MF	(Turkey)	Ozan Tufan	26	(England) Watford	Loan	Summer	Free	
27	FW	(Senegal)	Mame Thiam	28	Kayserispor	Transfer	Summer	€1.50M	
66	MF	(Turkey)	Oğuz Kağan Güçtekin	22	(Belgium) Westerlo	Transfer	Summer	Free	
15	FW	(Tanzania)	Mbwana Samatta	28	(Belgium) Royal Antwerp	Loan	Summer	Free	
28	DF	(Uruguay)	Mauricio Lemos	25	(Belgium) Beerschot	Loan	Summer	Free	
	MF	(Argentina)	Diego Perotti	33		Mutual agreement	Summer	Free	
2	MF	(Morocco)	Nabil Dirar	35	Kasımpaşa	Transfer	Summer	Free	
6	DF	(Denmark)	Zanka	31	(England) Brentford	Contract termination	Summer	Free	
88	DF	(Turkey)	Caner Erkin	32	Fatih Karagümrük	Transfer	Summer	Free	
44	DF	(Sierra Leone)	Steven Caulker	29	Gaziantep	Loan	Summer	Free	
	FW	(Iran)	Allahyar Sayyadmanesh	20	(England) Hull City	Loan	Winter	Free	
6	MF	(Germany)	Max Meyer	26	(Denmark) Midtjylland	Loan	Winter	Free	
23	MF	(Turkey)	Muhammed Gümüşkaya	21	Giresunspor	Loan	Winter	Free	
80	MF	(Turkey)	Fatih Yiğit Şanlıtürk	19	Ümraniyespor	Transfer	Winter	Undisclosed	
	MF	(Germany)	Sinan Gümüş	28	Antalyaspor	Contract termination	Winter	Free	

Total spending: ▼€4.35M
Total income: ▲€2.30M
Expenditure: ▼€2.05M

=== Contract renewals ===
No.	Pos.	Nat.	Name	Age	Status	Contract length	Expiry date	Source
16	MF	(Turkey)	Ferdi Kadıoğlu	22	Extended	Four-year	2026	
23	MF	(Turkey)	Muhammed Gümüşkaya	21	Extended	Three-year	2026	
25	MF	(Turkey)	Arda Güler	17	Extended	Two-year	2025	
54	GK	(Turkey)	Ertuğrul Çetin	18	Extended	Three-year	2024	
91	FW	(Turkey)	Melih Bostan	17	Extended	Five-year	2027	
4	DF	(Turkey)	Serdar Aziz	31	Extended	Three-year	2025	

== Pre-season and friendlies ==
Win Draw Loss Fixtures

=== Pre-season ===
15 July 2021 Friendly	Fenerbahçe (Turkey)	2–0	(Romania) Miercurea Ciuc	Düzce, Turkey
17:00 TRT (UTC+3)	Gümüş 26'; Aziz 68'	Report		Stadium: Fenerbahçe Serkan Acar Resort & Sports Topuk Yaylası Facilities; Attendance: 0

19 July 2021 Friendly	Fenerbahçe (Turkey)	4–1	(Turkey) Kasımpaşa	Istanbul, Turkey
19:00 TRT (UTC+3)	Kahveci 13' (pen.); Samatta 26'; Dursun 49' (pen.); Yandaş 62'	Report	Erdoğan 41' (pen.)	Stadium: Fenerbahçe Can Bartu Facilities; Attendance: 0 Referee: Mustafa Kürşad Filiz

26 July 2021 Friendly	Gençlerbirliği (Turkey)	0–4	(Turkey) Fenerbahçe	Ankara, Turkey
17:30 TRT (UTC+3)	Karakaş (yellow card) 76'; Seyhan (yellow card) 82'; Kula (yellow card) 87'	Report	Sangaré 49'; Tufan 59'; Yandaş (yellow card) 62'; Gümüşkaya 70'; Zajc 79'	Stadium: İlhan Cavcav Facilities; Attendance: 0 Referee: Burak Pakkan

28 July 2021 Friendly	Fenerbahçe (Turkey)	2–2	(Netherlands) PEC Zwolle	Istanbul, Turkey
19:00 TRT (UTC+3)	Zajc (yellow card) 38'; Tisserand 45'; Valencia 48'	Report	Bajselmani (yellow card) 44'; Saymak 68'; Landu 81'	Stadium: Atatürk Olympic Stadium; Referee: Onur Özütoprak

31 July 2021 Friendly	Fenerbahçe (Turkey)	3–2	(Germany) Greuther Fürth	Istanbul, Turkey
19:00 TRT (UTC+3)	Zajc 4'; Dursun 8', 30'	Report	Barry 34'; Jung (yellow card) 56'; Leweling 76'	Stadium: Atatürk Olympic Stadium; Referee: Can Cengiz

4 August 2021 Friendly	Fenerbahçe (Turkey)	1–1	(Ukraine) Dynamo Kyiv	Istanbul, Turkey
19:00 TRT (UTC+3)	Pelkas 63'	Report	Lyednyev 28'; Harmash (yellow card) 84'	Stadium: Atatürk Olympic Stadium; Referee: Çağdaş Altay

9 August 2021 Friendly	Giresunspor (Turkey)	1–3	(Turkey) Fenerbahçe	Giresun, Turkey
20:00 TRT (UTC+3)	Pelupessy 60'	Report	Pelkas (yellow card) 8'; Szalai 23'; Dursun 44'; Valencia 76'	Stadium: Çotanak Sports Complex; Referee: Furkan Aksuoğlu

=== Mid-season ===
19 April 2022 Global Tour for Peace	Fenerbahçe (Turkey)	1–0	(Ukraine) Shakhtar Donetsk	Istanbul, Turkey
17:00 TRT (UTC+3)	Valencia 26'; Luiz Gustavo (yellow card) 84'		Myshnyov (yellow card) 86'	Stadium: Şükrü Saracoğlu Stadium; Attendance: 11,781; Referee: Onur Öztoprak

== Competitions ==
=== Overview ===
Competition	First match	Last match	Starting round	Final position	Record							
Competition	First match	Last match	Starting round	Final position	Pld	W	D	L	GF	GA	GD	Win %
Süper Lig	15 August 2021	21 May 2022	Matchday 1	2nd	38	21	10	7	73	38	+35	55.26
Turkish Cup	29 December 2021	8 February 2022	Fifth round	Round of 16	2	1	0	1	2	1	+1	50.00
UEFA Europa League	19 August 2021	9 December 2021	Play-off round	Group stage	8	3	3	2	13	10	+3	37.50
UEFA Europa Conference League	17 February 2022	24 February 2022	Knockout round play-offs	Knockout round play-offs	2	0	0	2	4	6	−2	0.00
Total					50	25	13	12	92	55	+37	50.00

Source: Soccerway

=== Süper Lig ===
==== League table ====
Pos	Team	Pld	W	D	L	GF	GA	GD	Pts	Qualification or relegation
1	Trabzonspor (C)	38	23	12	3	69	36	+33	81	Qualification for the Champions League play-off round
2	Fenerbahçe	38	21	10	7	73	38	+35	73	Qualification for the Champions League second qualifying round
3	Konyaspor	38	20	8	10	66	45	+21	68	Qualification for the Europa Conference League second qualifying round
4	Başakşehir	38	19	8	11	56	36	+20	65	Qualification for the Europa Conference League second qualifying round
5	Alanyaspor	38	19	7	12	67	58	+9	64	

Source: Süper Lig
Rules for classification: 1) Points; 2) Head-to-head points; 3) Head-to-head goal difference; 4) Head-to-head goals scored; 5) Goal difference; 6) Goals scored; 7) Play-off.
(C) Champions

==== Results summary ====
Overall								Home						Away					
Pld	W	D	L	GF	GA	GD	Pts	W	D	L	GF	GA	GD	W	D	L	GF	GA	GD
38	21	10	7	73	38	+35	73	11	5	3	33	17	+16	10	5	4	40	21	+19

Source: TFF.org

Pld = Matches played; W = Matches won; D = Matches drawn; L = Matches lost; GF = Goals for; GA = Goals against; GD = Goal difference; Pts = Points

==== Results by round ====
Round	1	2	3	4	5	6	7	8	9	10	11	12	13	14	15	16	17	18	19	20	21	22	23	24	25	26	27	28	29	30	31	32	33	34	35	36	37	38
Ground	A	H	A	H	A	H	A	H	A	H	A	H	A	A	H	A	H	A	H	H	A	H	A	H	A	H	A	H	A	H	A	H	H	A	H	A	H	A
Result	W	W	W	D	L	W	W	W	L	L	L	D	W	D	W	L	D	D	W	L	D	W	D	L	W	W	W	D	W	W	W	W	W	W	W	D	D	W
Position	7	4	2	3	6	4	1	1	3	5	7	7	5	4	3	5	5	4	4	5	6	4	6	6	6	5	4	4	3	3	3	2	2	2	2	2	2	2

Source: TFF.org
A = Away; H = Home; W = Win; D = Draw; L = Loss

==== Matches ====
15 August 2021 1	Adana Demirspor	0–1	Fenerbahçe	Adana
21:45 TRT (UTC+3)	Sanuç (yellow card) 90+1'	Report	Tisserand (yellow card) 31'; Özil 46'; Osayi-Samuel (yellow card) 82'	Stadium: New Adana Stadium; Attendance: 10,340; Referee: Ali Şansalan

22 August 2021 2	Fenerbahçe	2–0	Antalyaspor	Istanbul
21:45 TRT (UTC+3)	Sangaré (yellow card) 62'; Zajc 89'; Valencia 90+2'	Report	Naldo (yellow card) 90+3'; Boffin (yellow card) 90+6'	Stadium: Şükrü Saracoğlu Stadium; Attendance: 8,637; Referee: Halil Umut Meler

29 August 2021 3	Altay	0–2	Fenerbahçe	İzmir
21:45 TRT (UTC+3)		Report	Kadıoğlu 51', (yellow card) 75'; Valencia 55'	Stadium: Bornova Aziz Kocaoğlu Stadium; Attendance: 2,579; Referee: Yaşar Kemal Uğurlu

12 September 2021 4	Fenerbahçe	1–1	Sivasspor	Istanbul
17:00 TRT (UTC+3)	Osayi-Samuel 23'; Bayındır (yellow card) 44'; Zajc (yellow card) 83'	Report	Cofie (yellow card) 13'; Pedro Henrique 45' (pen.), (yellow card) 79'; Çiftçi (yellow card) 90+3'	Stadium: Şükrü Saracoğlu Stadium; Attendance: 21,620; Referee: Halis Özkahya

19 September 2021 5	İstanbul Başakşehir	2–0	Fenerbahçe	Istanbul
19:00 TRT (UTC+3)	Okaka 16'; Gulbrandsen 90'	Report	Luiz Gustavo (yellow card) 83'	Stadium: Başakşehir Fatih Terim Stadium; Attendance: 1,813; Referee: Fırat Aydınus

23 September 2021 6	Fenerbahçe	2–1	Giresunspor	Istanbul
20:00 TRT (UTC+3)	Kadıoğlu 2'; Yandaş (yellow card) 32'; Özil 64'; Kim (yellow card) 67'	Report	Baldé (penalty missed) 40'; Doukara 85'; Piri (yellow card) 90+5'	Stadium: Şükrü Saracoğlu Stadium; Attendance: 13,762; Referee: Cüneyt Çakır

26 September 2021 7	Hatayspor	1–2	Fenerbahçe	Hatay
16:00 TRT (UTC+3)	Saint-Louis 70'; Diouf (yellow card) 78'; Kamara (yellow card) 86'	Report	Rossi 17'; Novák 29', (yellow card) 90+1'; Yandaş (yellow card) 44'	Stadium: New Hatay Stadium; Attendance: 9,924; Referee: Abdulkadir Bitigen

3 October 2021 8	Fenerbahçe	2–1	Kasımpaşa	Istanbul
16:00 TRT (UTC+3)	Berisha 16'; Crespo (yellow card) 26'; Rossi (yellow card) 45+2'; Luiz Gustavo 45+5', (yellow card) 59'; Aziz (yellow card) 73'; Novák (yellow card) 74'	Report	Sadiku (yellow card) 35'; Trávník 53'; Bozok (yellow card) 62'; Aytaç (yellow card) 76'	Stadium: Şükrü Saracoğlu Stadium; Attendance: 18,062; Referee: Atilla Karaoğlan

17 October 2021 9	Trabzonspor	3–1	Fenerbahçe	Trabzon
19:00 TRT (UTC+3)	Bakasetas 25', 87' (pen.); Ié (yellow card) 61'; Kardeşler (yellow card) 87'; Sari 90'; Çakır (yellow card) 90+2'	Report	Rossi 3'; Kim (yellow card) 14' (yellow-red card) 23'; Luiz Gustavo (yellow card) 37'; Valencia (yellow card) 61'; Szalai (yellow card) 85'	Stadium: Medical Park Stadium; Attendance: 19,677; Referee: Ali Şansalan

24 October 2021 10	Fenerbahçe	1–2	Alanyaspor	Istanbul
19:00 TRT (UTC+3)	Zajc (yellow card) 32'; Dursun 80'; Novák (yellow card) 85'	Report	Novais (yellow card) 70'; Akbaba 75'; Bekiroğlu 90+3'	Stadium: Şükrü Saracoğlu Stadium; Attendance: 24,369; Referee: Halil Umut Meler

30 October 2021 11	Konyaspor	2–1	Fenerbahçe	Konya
19:00 TRT (UTC+3)	Dikmen 2'; Bardakcı 11'; Cikalleshi (yellow card) 88'	Report	Zajc (yellow card) 65'; Kahveci 84'; Yandaş (yellow card) 88'	Stadium: Konya Metropolitan Municipality Stadium; Attendance: 10,846; Referee: Fırat Aydınus

7 November 2021 12	Fenerbahçe	2–2	Kayserispor	Istanbul
19:00 TRT (UTC+3)	Kahveci (penalty missed) 33; Zajc 85'; Özil 90+9' (pen.)	Report	Kolovetsios 39'; Gavranović 61'; Civelek (yellow card) 90+8'	Stadium: Şükrü Saracoğlu Stadium; Attendance: 17,698; Referee: Cüneyt Çakır

21 November 2021 13	Galatasaray	1–2	Fenerbahçe	Istanbul
19:00 TRT (UTC+3)	Aktürkoğlu 16'; Kutlu (yellow card) 25'; Muslera (yellow card) 35'; Marcão (yellow card) 35'; Nelsson (yellow card) 66'; Bayram (yellow card) 90+7'	Report	Tisserand (yellow card) 24' (yellow-red card) 82'; Özil 31'; Özer (yellow card) 35'; Yandaş (yellow card) 35'; Crespo 90+4'; Kahveci (yellow card) 90+6'; Szalai (yellow card) 90+6'	Stadium: Nef Stadium; Attendance: 47,678; Referee: Halil Umut Meler

29 November 2021 14	Göztepe	1–1	Fenerbahçe	İzmir
20:00 TRT (UTC+3)	Jahović 40'; Akbunar (yellow card) 74'; Nwobodo (yellow card) 90+3'	Report	Zajc (yellow card) 42'; Dursun 48'; Novák (yellow card) 59' (yellow-red card) 88'; Sosa (yellow card) 74'; Kahveci (yellow card) 75'; Aziz (yellow card) 75'	Stadium: Gürsel Aksel Stadium; Attendance: 16,226; Referee: Mete Kalkavan

5 December 2021 15	Fenerbahçe	4–0	Çaykur Rizespor	Istanbul
19:00 TRT (UTC+3)	Crespo (yellow card) 9'; Berisha 13'; Dursun 70', 79', 90'	Report	Bolasie (yellow card) 68'	Stadium: Şükrü Saracoğlu Stadium; Attendance: 17,879; Referee: Zorbay Küçük

13 December 2021 16	Gaziantep	3–2	Fenerbahçe	Gaziantep
20:30 TRT (UTC+3)	Figueiredo 8', 73', (yellow card) 74'; Maxim 54', (yellow card) 59'; Soyalp (yellow card) 90+2'	Report	Özil 30'; Kim (yellow card) 51'; Zajc 67'; Tisserand (yellow card) 79'	Stadium: Kalyon Stadium; Attendance: 7,929; Referee: Atilla Karaoğlan

19 December 2021 17	Fenerbahçe	2–2	Beşiktaş	Istanbul
19:00 TRT (UTC+3)	Özil 14' (pen.); Berisha 30'; Szalai (yellow card) 74'; Aziz (yellow card) 78'	Report	Souza 25', 59'; Bozdoğan (yellow card) 43'; Yılmaz (yellow card) 69'; Batshuayi (yellow card) 78'; Özyakup (yellow card) 88'; Ghezzal (yellow card) 90+1'	Stadium: Şükrü Saracoğlu Stadium; Attendance: 42,589; Referee: Fırat Aydınus

22 December 2021 18	Fatih Karagümrük	1–1	Fenerbahçe	Istanbul
20:00 TRT (UTC+3)	Pešić 31'; Bekaroğlu (red card) 37'; Erkin (red card) 38'; Ugur (yellow card) 67'	Report	Özil 40' (pen.); Kahveci (yellow card) 72'	Stadium: Atatürk Olympic Stadium; Attendance: 821; Referee: Erkan Özdamar

26 December 2021 19	Fenerbahçe	2–0	Yeni Malatyaspor	Istanbul
19:00 TRT (UTC+3)	Novák 10'; Pelkas 73', (yellow card) 80'	Report	Wallace (yellow card) 58'	Stadium: Şükrü Saracoğlu Stadium; Attendance: 12,905; Referee: Yaşar Kemal Uğurlu

10 January 2022 20	Fenerbahçe	1–2	Adana Demirspor	Istanbul
20:00 TRT (UTC+3)	Valencia 29' (pen.); Yandaş (yellow card) 47'; Osayi-Samuel (yellow card) 90+2'	Report	Svensson (yellow card) 27'; Inler 34'; Stambouli (yellow card) 40'; Belhanda 46', (yellow card) 47'	Stadium: Şükrü Saracoğlu Stadium; Attendance: 14,791; Referee: Halil Umut Meler

15 January 2022 21	Antalyaspor	1–1	Fenerbahçe	Antalya
19:00 TRT (UTC+3)	Sarı (yellow card) 71'; Fredy (yellow card) 71'; Sinik 81'; Kudryashov (yellow card) 90+7'	Report	Kadıoğlu (yellow card) 30'; Dursun 72'	Stadium: Antalya Stadium; Attendance: 13,394; Referee: Atilla Karaoğlan

19 January 2022 22	Fenerbahçe	2–1	Altay	Istanbul
20:00 TRT (UTC+3)	Szalai (yellow card) 23'; Kadıoğlu (yellow card) 29'; Kahveci 37'; Dursun 71'	Report	Rayyan 14'; Pinares (yellow card) 42'; Gülselam (yellow card) 60'; Rodríguez (yellow card) 67'; Thaciano (yellow card) 82'	Stadium: Şükrü Saracoğlu Stadium; Attendance: 8,746; Referee: Hüseyin Göçek

22 January 2022 23	Sivasspor	1–1	Fenerbahçe	Sivas
16:00 TRT (UTC+3)	Altınay (yellow card) 15'; Pedro Henrique 74'; Oğuz (yellow card) 83'	Report	Zajc 18'; Aziz (yellow card) 34'; Sangaré (yellow card) 65'; Crespo (yellow card) 73'	Stadium: 4 Eylül Stadium; Attendance: 4,799; Referee: Alper Ulusoy

5 February 2022 24	Fenerbahçe	0–1	İstanbul Başakşehir	Istanbul
19:00 TRT (UTC+3)	Crespo (yellow card) 24'; Özer (yellow card) 38'; Berisha (yellow card) 72'	Report	Türüç (yellow card) 39'; Ciğerci (yellow card) 51'; Özcan 61', (yellow card) 75'; Duarte (yellow card) 70'	Stadium: Şükrü Saracoğlu Stadium; Attendance: 18,560; Referee: Yaşar Kemal Uğurlu

12 February 2022 25	Giresunspor	1–2	Fenerbahçe	Giresun
16:00 TRT (UTC+3)	Chiquinho 2', (yellow card) 43'; Pérez (red card) 82'; Yavru (yellow card) 90+6'	Report	Szalai (yellow card) 25'; Valencia 30'; Pelkas 53'; Bayındır (yellow card) 77'; Yandaş (yellow card) 90+5'; Kadıoğlu (yellow card) 90+6'	Stadium: Çotanak Sports Complex; Attendance: 11,167; Referee: Zorbay Küçük

20 February 2022 26	Fenerbahçe	2–0	Hatayspor	Istanbul
19:00 TRT (UTC+3)	Dursun 67' (pen.), 81' (pen.)	Report	Ribeiro (yellow card) 17'; Temel (yellow card) 38'	Stadium: Şükrü Saracoğlu Stadium; Attendance: 7,923; Referee: Yasin Kol

28 February 2022 27	Kasımpaşa	1–2	Fenerbahçe	Istanbul
20:00 TRT (UTC+3)	Eysseric (yellow card) 48'; Muleka 67'; Elmalı (yellow card) 90+3'; Spajić (yellow card) 90+4'; Donk (yellow card) 90+7'; Mabil (yellow card) 90+7' (yellow-red card) 90+7'	Report	Zajc 6'; Dursun (yellow card) 86'; Szalai 90+1'	Stadium: Recep Tayyip Erdoğan Stadium; Attendance: 2,313; Referee: Mete Kalkavan

6 March 2022 28	Fenerbahçe	1–1	Trabzonspor	Istanbul
19:00 TRT (UTC+3)	Kahveci (red card) 18'; Crespo (yellow card) 65'; Zajc 71'; Berisha (yellow card) 80'	Report	Nwakaeme 22'; Višća (yellow card) 28'	Stadium: Şükrü Saracoğlu Stadium; Attendance: 42,100; Referee: Zorbay Küçük

13 March 2022 29	Alanyaspor	2–5	Fenerbahçe	Alanya, Antalya
19:00 TRT (UTC+3)	Awaziem (yellow card) 49'; Bingöl 53', 67'	Report	Rossi 26'; Özil 50' (pen.); Dursun (yellow card) 61'; Güler 78'; Pelkas (yellow card) 87', (goal) 90'; Berisha 90+4'	Stadium: Bahçeşehir Okulları Stadium; Attendance: 5,772; Referee: Volkan Bayarslan

20 March 2022 30	Fenerbahçe	2–1	Konyaspor	Istanbul
19:00 TRT (UTC+3)	Kim (yellow card) 53', (goal) 66'; Aziz (yellow card) 53'; Pelkas 88'; Rossi (yellow card) 90+2'	Report	Bytyqi 35'; Çekiçi (yellow card) 56'; Hadžiahmetović (yellow card) 64'; Dikmen (yellow card) 69'	Stadium: Şükrü Saracoğlu Stadium; Attendance: 35,397; Referee: Halil Umut Meler

2 April 2022 31	Kayserispor	0–4	Fenerbahçe	Kayseri
16:00 TRT (UTC+3)	Bulut (yellow card) 73'	Report	Zajc 16'; Aziz (yellow card) 35'; Rossi 45'; Kahveci 54'; Osayi-Samuel (yellow card) 56'; Güler 90+3'	Stadium: Kadir Has Stadium; Attendance: 13,142; Referee: Atilla Karaoğlan

10 April 2022 32	Fenerbahçe	2–0	Galatasaray	Istanbul
20:30 TRT (UTC+3)	Zajc 26'; Aziz (yellow card) 33'; Yandaş (yellow card) 56'; Kahveci (yellow card) 62'; Dursun 68'	Report	Marcão (yellow card) 40'; Babel (yellow card) 45+2'; Cicâldău (yellow card) 58'; Antalyalı (yellow card) 90+2'	Stadium: Şükrü Saracoğlu Stadium; Attendance: 43,878; Referee: Atilla Karaoğlan

16 April 2022 33	Fenerbahçe	2–0	Göztepe	Istanbul
20:30 TRT (UTC+3)	Aziz 4'; Güler 83' (pen.)	Report	Di Santo (yellow card) 66'; Moubandje (yellow card) 77' (red card) 81'; Demirtaş (yellow card) 90+5'	Stadium: Şükrü Saracoğlu Stadium; Attendance: 42,270; Referee: Yasin Kol

22 April 2022 34	Çaykur Rizespor	0–6	Fenerbahçe	Rize
20:30 TRT (UTC+3)	Baiano (red card) 1'; Sabo (yellow card) 11'; Albayrak (yellow card) 45+8'; Holmén (yellow card) 86'	Report	Rossi 9'; Dursun 45+3' (pen.), 45+9' (pen.), 51'; Kim (yellow card) 52'; Valencia 65'; Sangaré 76'	Stadium: Çaykur Didi Stadium; Attendance: 5,221; Referee: Halil Umut Meler

29 April 2022 35	Fenerbahçe	3–2	Gaziantep	Istanbul
20:30 TRT (UTC+3)	Rossi 5'; Kahveci (yellow card) 55'; Dursun 62'; Aziz (yellow card) 80'; Zajc 82'	Report	Djilobodji (yellow card) 52'; Kitsiou (yellow card) 55'; Vetrih (yellow card) 55'; Sagal 64'; Maxim (yellow card) 69' (goal) 90+7' (pen.)	Stadium: Şükrü Saracoğlu Stadium; Attendance: 36,685; Referee: Sarper Barış Saka

8 May 2022 36	Beşiktaş	1–1	Fenerbahçe	Istanbul
19:00 TRT (UTC+3)	Souza (yellow card) 29'; Ghezzal 31' (pen.) (yellow card) 45+2'; Welinton (yellow card) 36'; Destanoğlu (yellow card) 45+4'; N'Koudou (yellow card) 89'; Yılmaz (yellow card) 90+3'	Report	Novák 6'; Kahveci (yellow card) 29'; Yandaş (yellow card) 45+4'; Kadıoğlu (yellow card) 90+2'	Stadium: Vodafone Park; Attendance: 38,563; Referee: Arda Kardeşler

15 May 2022 37	Fenerbahçe	0–0	Fatih Karagümrük	Istanbul
19:00 TRT (UTC+3)	Kahveci (yellow card) 61'; Sangaré (yellow card) 71'; Tisserand (yellow card) 84'; Osayi-Samuel (yellow card) 89'	Report	Bekaroğlu (yellow card) 14'; Borini (yellow card) 85'	Stadium: Şükrü Saracoğlu Stadium; Attendance: 41,853; Referee: Halil Umut Meler

21 May 2022 38	Yeni Malatyaspor	0–5	Fenerbahçe	Malatya
19:00 TRT (UTC+3)	Başdaş (red card) 23'; Müjde (yellow card) 45+7'	Report	Aziz (yellow card) 22', (goal) 57'; Yandaş (yellow card) 24'; Dursun 32'; Szalai (yellow card) 70'; Kahveci 75'; Valencia 77', 89'	Stadium: New Malatya Stadium; Attendance: 3,901; Referee: Volkan Bayarslan

=== Turkish Cup ===
29 December 2021 Fifth round	Fenerbahçe	2–0 (a.e.t.)	Afjet Afyonspor	Istanbul
21:00 TRT (UTC+3)	Crespo (yellow card) 72'; Valencia 94' (pen.); Osayi-Samuel 99'; Yandaş (yellow card) 108'	Report	Candoğan (yellow card) 65'; Şentürk (yellow card) 79'; Tursun (yellow card) 85'; Atağ (yellow card) 87'	Stadium: Şükrü Saracoğlu Stadium; Referee: Turgut Doman

8 February 2022 Round of 16	Fenerbahçe	0–1	Kayserispor	Istanbul
20:30 TRT (UTC+3)	Kim (yellow card) 84'	Report	Demirok (red card) 45+3'; Bayazıt (yellow card) 74'; Kemen (yellow card) 75'; Civelek 90+4'	Stadium: Şükrü Saracoğlu Stadium; Referee: Arda Kardeşler

=== UEFA Europa League ===
==== Play-off round ====
19 August 2021 First leg	Fenerbahçe (Turkey)	1–0	(Finland) HJK	Istanbul, Turkey
21:45 TRT (UTC+3)	Aziz (yellow card) 41'; Gümüşkaya 65'	Report	Murillo (yellow card) 47'; Browne (yellow card) 89'	Stadium: Şükrü Saracoğlu Stadium; Attendance: 6,769; Referee: Benoît Bastien (France)

26 August 2021 Second leg	HJK (Finland)	2–5 (2–6 agg.)	(Turkey) Fenerbahçe	Helsinki, Finland
19:00 EEST (UTC+3)	Hostikka (yellow card) 3'; Ro. Riski 27'; Ri. Riski 88'; Peltola (yellow card) 90'	Report	Valencia 11', 14', 52'; Güler (yellow card) 75'; Şanlıtürk 90+1'; Peltola 90+4' (o.g.)	Stadium: Bolt Arena; Attendance: 3,785; Referee: Ivan Kružliak (Slovakia)

==== Group stage ====
The group stage draw was held on 27 August 2021.

Pos	Team	Pld	W	D	L	GF	GA	GD	Pts	Qualification	FRA	OLY	FEN	ANT
1	(Germany) Eintracht Frankfurt	6	3	3	0	10	6	+4	12	Advance to round of 16	—	3–1	1–1	2–2
2	(Greece) Olympiacos	6	3	0	3	8	7	+1	9	Advance to knockout round play-offs	1–2	—	1–0	2–1
3	(Turkey) Fenerbahçe	6	1	3	2	7	8	−1	6	Transfer to Europa Conference League	1–1	0–3	—	2–2
4	(Belgium) Antwerp	6	1	2	3	6	10	−4	5		0–1	1–0	0–3	—

Source: UEFA
Rules for classification: Group stage tiebreakers

16 September 2021 1	Eintracht Frankfurt (Germany)	1–1	(Turkey) Fenerbahçe	Frankfurt, Germany
21:00 CEST (UTC+2)	Lammers 41'; Jakić (yellow card) 90+6'; Hrustic (yellow card) 90+6'	Report	Özil 10'; Meyer (yellow card) 83'; Luiz Gustavo (yellow card) 86'; Pelkas (penalty missed) 90+2'; Osayi-Samuel (yellow card) 90+5'; Özer (yellow card) 90+6'	Stadium: Deutsche Bank Park; Attendance: 25,000; Referee: Maurizio Mariani (Italy)

30 September 2021 2	Fenerbahçe (Turkey)	0–3	(Greece) Olympiacos	Istanbul, Turkey
19:45 TRT (UTC+3)	Valencia (yellow card) 42'; Zajc (yellow card) 72'	Report	Tiquinho 6'; Reabciuk (yellow card) 38'; Cissé (yellow card) 42'; Ba (yellow card) 45'; Masouras 63', 68'	Stadium: Şükrü Saracoğlu Stadium; Attendance: 22,160; Referee: Alejandro Hernández (Spain)

21 October 2021 3	Fenerbahçe (Turkey)	2–2	(Belgium) Antwerp	Istanbul, Turkey
19:45 TRT (UTC+3)	Valencia 21', 45' (pen.), (penalty missed) 37'; Kadıoğlu (yellow card) 40'; Szalai (yellow card) 59'; Zajc (yellow card) 75'	Report	Samatta 2'; Fischer (yellow card) 44'; Priske (yellow card) 48'; De Laet (yellow card) 54'; Gerkens 62', (yellow card) 81'	Stadium: Şükrü Saracoğlu Stadium; Attendance: 16,629; Referee: Sergey Ivanov (Russia)

4 November 2021 4	Antwerp (Belgium)	0–3	(Turkey) Fenerbahçe	Antwerp, Belgium
21:00 CET (UTC+1)		Report	Yandaş 8'; Meyer 16'; Kahveci (yellow card) 26'; Berisha 29'	Stadium: Bosuilstadion; Attendance: 0 (Note: The match was played behind closed doors.); Referee: Irfan Peljto (Bosnia and Herzegovina)

25 November 2021 5	Olympiacos (Greece)	1–0	(Turkey) Fenerbahçe	Piraeus, Greece
22:00 EET (UTC+2)	Ba (yellow card) 39'; Soares 90', (yellow card) 90'	Report	Pelkas (yellow card) 90'	Stadium: Karaiskakis Stadium; Attendance: 22,405; Referee: Antonio Mateu Lahoz (Spain)

9 December 2021 6	Fenerbahçe (Turkey)	1–1	(Germany) Eintracht Frankfurt	Istanbul, Turkey
20:45 TRT (UTC+3)	Pelkas (yellow card) 38'; Berisha 42'; Sosa (yellow card) 44'	Report	Sow 29'; Chandler (yellow card) 54'; Ndicka (yellow card) 60'; Paciência (yellow card) 90+2'	Stadium: Şükrü Saracoğlu Stadium; Attendance: 8,932; Referee: Srđan Jovanović (Serbia)

=== UEFA Europa Conference League ===
==== Knockout phase ====
===== Knockout round play-offs =====
The draw for the knockout round play-offs was held on 13 December 2021.

17 February 2022 First leg	Fenerbahçe (Turkey)	2–3	(Czech Republic) Slavia Prague	Istanbul, Turkey
20:45 TRT (UTC+3)	Zajc (yellow card) 7'; Pelkas 58'; Szalai (yellow card) 61'; Kadıoğlu 83'	Report	Traoré 45'; Dorley (yellow card) 52', (goal) 62'; Lingr 64'	Stadium: Şükrü Saracoğlu Stadium; Attendance: 30,094; Referee: Maurizio Mariani (Italy)

24 February 2022 Second leg	Slavia Prague (Czech Republic)	3–2 (6–4 agg.)	(Turkey) Fenerbahçe	Prague, Czech Republic
21:00 CET (UTC+1)	Schranz 19'; Kacharaba (yellow card) 20'; Sor 27', 63'; Tecl (yellow card) 90+3'	Report	Osayi-Samuel (yellow card) 31'; Yandaş (yellow card) 32', (goal) 39'; Pelkas (yellow card) 42'; Berisha 90'	Stadium: Sinobo Stadium; Attendance: 10,120; Referee: Chris Kavanagh (England)

== Statistics ==
=== Appearances and goals ===
No.	Pos	Nat	Player	Total		Süper Lig		Turkish Cup		Europa League		Europa Conference League	
No.	Pos	Nat	Player	Apps	Goals	Apps	Goals	Apps	Goals	Apps	Goals	Apps	Goals
Goalkeepers
1	GK	(Turkey) TUR	Altay Bayındır	31	0	24	0	0	0	5	0	2	0
35	GK	(Turkey) TUR	Berke Özer	19	0	14	0	2	0	3	0	0	0
54	GK	(Turkey) TUR	Ertuğrul Çetin	2	0	2	0	0	0	0	0	0	0
59	GK	(Turkey) TUR	Bartu Kulbilge	0	0	0	0	0	0	0	0	0	0
Defenders
3	DF	(South Korea) KOR	Kim Min-jae	40	1	31	1	1	0	6	0	2	0
4	DF	(Turkey) TUR	Serdar Aziz	29	2	25	2	0	0	3	0	1	0
30	DF	(Turkey) TUR	Nazım Sangaré	27	1	19	1	2	0	4	0	2	0
32	DF	(Democratic Republic of the Congo) COD	Marcel Tisserand	27	0	19	0	1	0	5	0	2	0
33	DF	(Turkey) TUR	Çağtay Kurukalıp	2	0	2	0	0	0	0	0	0	0
37	DF	(Czech Republic) CZE	Filip Novák	27	3	20	3	1	0	6	0	0	0
41	DF	(Hungary) HUN	Attila Szalai	43	1	31	1	2	0	8	0	2	0
Midfielders
5	MF	(Argentina) ARG	José Sosa	27	0	19	0	0	0	6	0	2	0
7	MF	(Turkey) TUR	Ozan Tufan	8	0	5	0	1	0	0	0	2	0
8	MF	(Turkey) TUR	Mert Hakan Yandaş	33	2	24	0	2	0	5	1	2	1
10	MF	(Germany) GER	Mesut Özil	26	9	22	8	0	0	4	1	0	0
14	MF	(Greece) GRE	Dimitrios Pelkas	30	5	21	4	2	0	5	0	2	1
16	MF	(Turkey) TUR	Ferdi Kadıoğlu	38	3	28	2	1	0	7	0	2	1
17	MF	(Turkey) TUR	İrfan Kahveci	29	4	24	4	1	0	4	0	0	0
20	MF	(Brazil) BRA	Luiz Gustavo	28	1	22	1	0	0	6	0	0	0
21	MF	(Nigeria) NGR	Bright Osayi-Samuel	43	2	31	1	2	1	8	0	2	0
25	MF	(Turkey) TUR	Arda Güler	16	3	12	3	0	0	2	0	2	0
26	MF	(Slovenia) SLO	Miha Zajc	41	9	32	9	1	0	7	0	1	0
27	MF	(Portugal) POR	Miguel Crespo	25	1	23	1	2	0	0	0	0	0
77	MF	(Turkey) TUR	Burak Kapacak	7	0	6	0	1	0	0	0	0	0
Forwards
9	FW	(Uruguay) URU	Diego Rossi	39	6	31	6	2	0	6	0	0	0
11	FW	(Germany) GER	Mërgim Berisha	31	7	22	4	1	0	6	2	2	1
13	FW	(Ecuador) ECU	Enner Valencia	33	13	25	7	2	1	4	5	2	0
19	FW	(Turkey) TUR	Serdar Dursun	37	15	33	15	2	0	0	0	2	0
91	FW	(Turkey) TUR	Melih Bostan	0	0	0	0	0	0	0	0	0	0
99	FW	(Albania) ALB	Arda Okan Kurtulan	1	0	1	0	0	0	0	0	0	0
Players transferred/loaned out during the season
2	MF	(Morocco) MAR	Nabil Dirar	0	0	0	0	0	0	0	0	0	0
6	DF	(Denmark) DEN	Zanka	0	0	0	0	0	0	0	0	0	0
6	MF	(Germany) GER	Max Meyer	12	1	6	0	1	0	5	1	0	0
15	FW	(Tanzania) TAN	Mbwana Samatta	3	0	3	0	0	0	0	0	0	0
23	MF	(Turkey) TUR	Muhammed Gümüşkaya	18	1	11	0	1	0	6	1	0	0
28	DF	(Uruguay) URU	Mauricio Lemos	0	0	0	0	0	0	0	0	0	0
44	DF	(Sierra Leone) SLE	Steven Caulker	0	0	0	0	0	0	0	0	0	0
80	MF	(Turkey) TUR	Fatih Yiğit Şanlıtürk	2	1	0	0	0	0	2	1	0	0

=== Goalscorers ===
Rank	No.	Pos	Nat	Player	Süper Lig	Turkish Cup	Europa League	Europa Conference League	Total
1	19	FW	(Turkey)	Serdar Dursun	15	0	0	0	15
2	13	FW	(Ecuador)	Enner Valencia	7	1	5	0	13
3	10	MF	(Germany)	Mesut Özil	8	0	1	0	9
3	26	MF	(Slovenia)	Miha Zajc	9	0	0	0	9
5	11	FW	(Germany)	Mërgim Berisha	4	0	2	1	7
6	9	FW	(Uruguay)	Diego Rossi	6	0	0	0	6
7	14	MF	(Greece)	Dimitrios Pelkas	4	0	0	1	5
8	17	MF	(Turkey)	İrfan Kahveci	4	0	0	0	4
9	16	MF	(Turkey)	Ferdi Kadıoğlu	2	0	0	1	3
9	25	MF	(Turkey)	Arda Güler	3	0	0	0	3
9	37	DF	(Czech Republic)	Filip Novák	3	0	0	0	3
12	8	MF	(Turkey)	Mert Hakan Yandaş	0	0	1	1	2
12	21	MF	(Nigeria)	Bright Osayi-Samuel	1	1	0	0	2
12	4	DF	(Turkey)	Serdar Aziz	2	0	0	0	2
15	3	DF	(South Korea)	Kim Min-jae	1	0	0	0	1
15	6	MF	(Germany)	Max Meyer	0	0	1	0	1
15	20	MF	(Brazil)	Luiz Gustavo	1	0	0	0	1
15	23	MF	(Turkey)	Muhammed Gümüşkaya	0	0	1	0	1
15	27	MF	(Portugal)	Miguel Crespo	1	0	0	0	1
15	30	DF	(Turkey)	Nazım Sangaré	1	0	0	0	1
15	41	DF	(Hungary)	Attila Szalai	1	0	0	0	1
15	80	MF	(Turkey)	Fatih Yiğit Şanlıtürk	0	0	1	0	1
Own goals					0	0	1	0	1
Totals					73	2	13	4	92

=== Hat-tricks ===
Player	Against	Result	Date	Competition	Ref
(Ecuador) Enner Valencia	(Finland) HJK	5–2 (A)	26 August 2021	UEFA Europa League	
(Turkey) Serdar Dursun	Çaykur Rizespor	4–0 (H)	5 December 2021	Süper Lig	
(Turkey) Serdar Dursun	Çaykur Rizespor	6–0 (A)	22 April 2022	Süper Lig	

(H) – Home; (A) – Away

=== Assists ===
Rank	No.	Pos	Nat	Player	Süper Lig	Turkish Cup	Europa League	Europa Conference League	Total
1	8	MF	(Turkey)	Mert Hakan Yandaş	9	0	1	0	10
2	9	FW	(Uruguay)	Diego Rossi	7	0	0	0	7
2	17	MF	(Turkey)	İrfan Kahveci	6	0	1	0	7
4	13	FW	(Ecuador)	Enner Valencia	5	0	0	0	5
5	21	MF	(Nigeria)	Bright Osayi-Samuel	3	0	0	1	4
5	25	MF	(Turkey)	Arda Güler	3	0	0	1	4
5	30	DF	(Turkey)	Nazım Sangaré	2	0	2	0	4
8	16	MF	(Turkey)	Ferdi Kadıoğlu	1	0	1	1	3
8	19	FW	(Turkey)	Serdar Dursun	3	0	0	0	3
8	37	DF	(Czech Republic)	Filip Novák	2	1	0	0	3
11	5	MF	(Argentina)	José Sosa	2	0	0	0	2
11	10	MF	(Germany)	Mesut Özil	2	0	0	0	2
11	11	FW	(Germany)	Mërgim Berisha	1	0	1	0	2
11	41	DF	(Hungary)	Attila Szalai	2	0	0	0	2
15	1	GK	(Turkey)	Altay Bayındır	1	0	0	0	1
15	4	DF	(Turkey)	Serdar Aziz	1	0	0	0	1
15	20	MF	(Brazil)	Luiz Gustavo	0	0	1	0	1
15	26	MF	(Slovenia)	Miha Zajc	1	0	0	0	1
15	27	MF	(Portugal)	Miguel Crespo	1	0	0	0	1
Totals					52	1	7	3	63

=== Clean sheets ===
Rank	No.	Pos	Nat	Player	Süper Lig	Turkish Cup	Europa League	Europa Conference League	Total
1	1	GK	(Turkey)	Altay Bayındır	10	0	1	0	11
2	35	GK	(Turkey)	Berke Özer	2	1	1	0	4
Totals					12	1	2	0	15

=== Disciplinary record ===
No.	Pos	Nat	Player	Süper Lig			Turkish Cup			Europa League			Europa Conference League			Total		
No.	Pos	Nat	Player	Yellow card	(yellow card) (yellow-red card)	Red card	Yellow card	(yellow card) (yellow-red card)	Red card	Yellow card	(yellow card) (yellow-red card)	Red card	Yellow card	(yellow card) (yellow-red card)	Red card	Yellow card	(yellow card) (yellow-red card)	Red card
1	GK	(Turkey)	Altay Bayındır	2	0	0	0	0	0	0	0	0	0	0	0	2	0	0
3	DF	(South Korea)	Kim Min-jae	5	1	0	1	0	0	0	0	0	0	0	0	6	1	0
4	DF	(Turkey)	Serdar Aziz	9	0	0	0	0	0	1	0	0	0	0	0	10	0	0
5	MF	(Argentina)	José Sosa	1	0	0	0	0	0	1	0	0	0	0	0	2	0	0
6	MF	(Germany)	Max Meyer	0	0	0	0	0	0	1	0	0	0	0	0	1	0	0
7	MF	(Turkey)	Ozan Tufan	0	0	0	0	0	0	0	0	0	0	0	0	0	0	0
8	MF	(Turkey)	Mert Hakan Yandaş	9	0	0	1	0	0	0	0	0	1	0	0	11	0	0
9	FW	(Uruguay)	Diego Rossi	2	0	0	0	0	0	0	0	0	0	0	0	2	0	0
10	MF	(Germany)	Mesut Özil	0	0	0	0	0	0	0	0	0	0	0	0	0	0	0
11	FW	(Germany)	Mërgim Berisha	2	0	0	0	0	0	0	0	0	0	0	0	2	0	0
13	FW	(Ecuador)	Enner Valencia	1	0	0	0	0	0	1	0	0	0	0	0	2	0	0
14	MF	(Greece)	Dimitrios Pelkas	2	0	0	0	0	0	2	0	0	1	0	0	5	0	0
16	MF	(Turkey)	Ferdi Kadıoğlu	5	0	0	0	0	0	1	0	0	0	0	0	6	0	0
17	MF	(Turkey)	İrfan Kahveci	7	0	1	0	0	0	1	0	0	0	0	0	8	0	1
19	FW	(Turkey)	Serdar Dursun	2	0	0	0	0	0	0	0	0	0	0	0	2	0	0
20	MF	(Brazil)	Luiz Gustavo	3	0	0	0	0	0	1	0	0	0	0	0	4	0	0
21	MF	(Nigeria)	Bright Osayi-Samuel	5	0	0	0	0	0	2	0	0	1	0	0	8	0	0
23	MF	(Turkey)	Muhammed Gümüşkaya	0	0	0	0	0	0	0	0	0	0	0	0	0	0	0
25	MF	(Turkey)	Arda Güler	0	0	0	0	0	0	1	0	0	0	0	0	1	0	0
26	MF	(Slovenia)	Miha Zajc	3	0	0	0	0	0	2	0	0	1	0	0	6	0	0
27	MF	(Portugal)	Miguel Crespo	5	0	0	1	0	0	0	0	0	0	0	0	6	0	0
30	DF	(Turkey)	Nazım Sangaré	3	0	0	0	0	0	0	0	0	0	0	0	3	0	0
32	DF	(Democratic Republic of the Congo)	Marcel Tisserand	4	1	0	0	0	0	0	0	0	0	0	0	4	1	0
33	DF	(Turkey)	Çağtay Kurukalıp	0	0	0	0	0	0	0	0	0	0	0	0	0	0	0
35	GK	(Turkey)	Berke Özer	2	0	0	0	0	0	1	0	0	0	0	0	3	0	0
37	DF	(Czech Republic)	Filip Novák	4	1	0	0	0	0	0	0	0	0	0	0	4	1	0
41	DF	(Hungary)	Attila Szalai	6	0	0	0	0	0	1	0	0	1	0	0	8	0	0
54	GK	(Turkey)	Ertuğrul Çetin	0	0	0	0	0	0	0	0	0	0	0	0	0	0	0
59	GK	(Turkey)	Bartu Kulbilge	0	0	0	0	0	0	0	0	0	0	0	0	0	0	0
77	MF	(Turkey)	Burak Kapacak	0	0	0	0	0	0	0	0	0	0	0	0	0	0	0
80	MF	(Turkey)	Fatih Yiğit Şanlıtürk	0	0	0	0	0	0	0	0	0	0	0	0	0	0	0
91	FW	(Turkey)	Melih Bostan	0	0	0	0	0	0	0	0	0	0	0	0	0	0	0
99	FW	(North Macedonia)	Arda Okan Kurtulan	0	0	0	0	0	0	0	0	0	0	0	0	0	0	0
