= Fatih Yiğit Şanlıtürk =

Turkish footballer (born 2003)

Personal information
- Date of birth: 1 January 2003 (age 23)
- Place of birth: Seyhan, Adana, Turkey
- Height: 1.76 m (5 ft 9 in)
- Position: Midfielder

Team information
- Current team: Çankaya
- Number: 27

Youth career
- 2012–2014: Bakırköy Aslanspor
- 2014–2015: Galatasaray
- 2015–2021: Fenerbahçe

Senior career*
Years	Team	Apps	(Gls)
2020–2022	Fenerbahçe	2	(0)
2022–2024	Ümraniyespor	10	(0)
2024–	Çankaya	2	(0)
- * Club domestic league appearances and goals as of 4 February 2024

Fatih Yiğit Şanlıtürk (born 1 January 2003) is a Turkish professional footballer who plays as a midfielder for Turkish TFF Third League club Çankaya.

== Professional career ==
On 23 November 2020, Şanlıtürk signed a professional contract with Fenerbahçe. He made his professional debut with Fenerbahçe in a 3–0 Süper Lig win over BB Erzurumspor on 11 January 2021, at the age of 18. He scored his first goal in his UEFA Europa League debut in a 2-5 win against Finnish club HJK in the play-off round of the 2021–22 UEFA Europa League.

On 5 February 2022, Şanlıtürk signed a two-and-a-half-year deal with Ümraniyespor.

== Career statistics ==
As of 30 September 2021

Appearances and goals by club, season and competition
Club	Season	League			Cup		Europe		Total	
Club	Season	Division	Apps	Goals	Apps	Goals	Apps	Goals	Apps	Goals
Fenerbahçe	2020–21	Süper Lig	2	0	0	0	—		2	0
Fenerbahçe	2021–22	Süper Lig	0	0	0	0	2 (Note: Appearance in UEFA Europa League)	1	2	1
Fenerbahçe	Total		2	0	0	0	2	1	4	1
Ümraniyespor	2021–22	TFF First League	0	0	0	0	—		0	0
Career total			2	0	0	0	1	1	3	1
