= Muhammed Gümüşkaya =

Turkish footballer (born 2001)

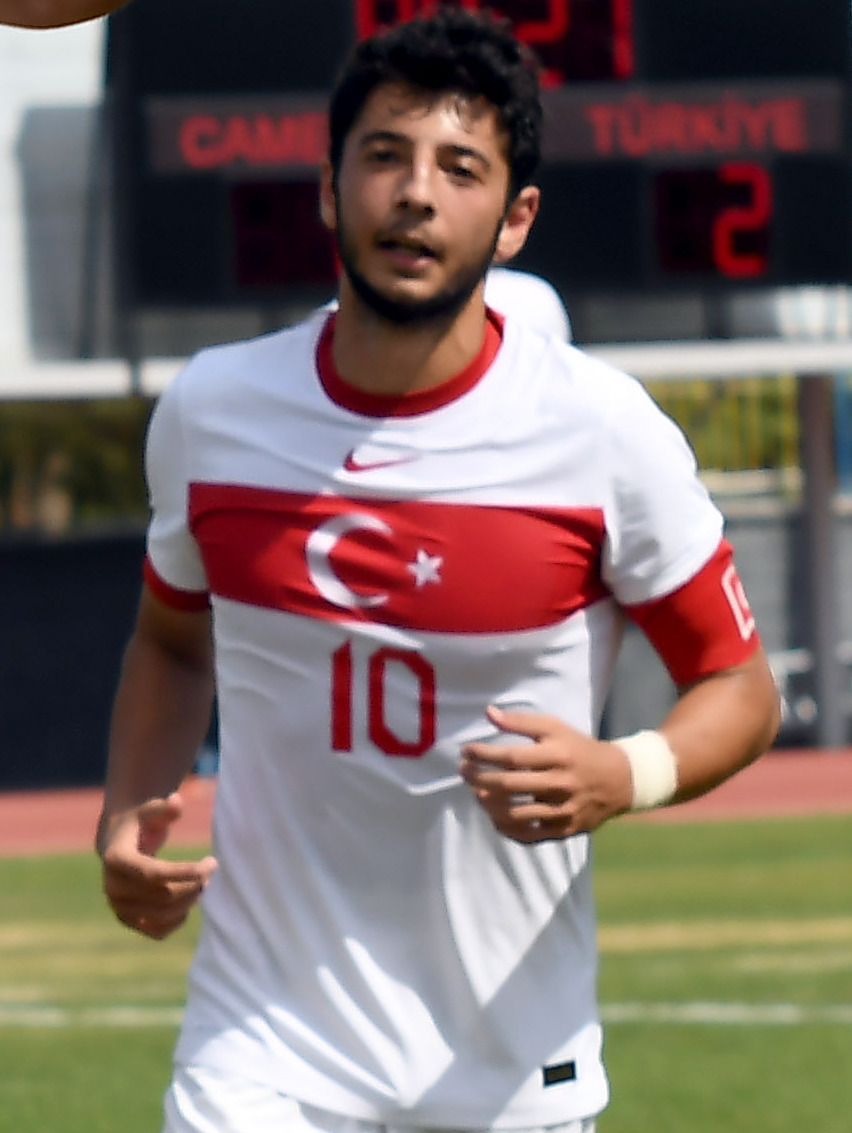
- Gümüşkaya in 2021 Islamic Solidarity Games

Personal information
- Date of birth: 1 January 2001 (age 25)
- Place of birth: Kâğıthane, Turkey
- Height: 1.77 m (5 ft 10 in)
- Position: Midfielder

Team information
- Current team: Bandırmaspor
- Number: 10

Youth career
- 2012–2018: Fenerbahçe

Senior career*
Years	Team	Apps	(Gls)
2018–2022	Fenerbahçe	12	(0)
2020–2021	→ Boluspor (loan)	20	(4)
2022	→ Giresunspor (loan)	14	(2)
2022–2025	Westerlo	23	(0)
2023–2024	→ Samsunspor (loan)	11	(0)
2025	→ Gaziantep (loan)	3	(0)
2025–	Bandırmaspor	32	(1)

International career
2016	Turkey U15	1	(0)
2017–2018	Turkey U17	8	(0)
2018–2019	Turkey U18	8	(0)
2019–2020	Turkey U19	3	(0)
2022	Turkey U23	4	(2)
Medal record
Men's football
Representing Turkey
Islamic Solidarity Games
Gold medal – first place	2021 Konya
- * Club domestic league appearances and goals as of 5 May 2026

Muhammed Gümüşkaya (born 1 January 2001) is a Turkish professional footballer who plays as a midfielder for TFF 1. Lig club Bandırmaspor.

== Club career ==
=== Fenerbahçe ===
On 26 June 2020, Gümüşkaya signed a professional contract with Fenerbahçe. He made his professional debut with the club in a 3–1 win over Çaykur Rizespor on 25 July 2020.

He scored his first goal in his international debut, on 20 August 2021, in a 1–0 win against Finnish club HJK Helsinki in the play-off round of the 2021–22 UEFA Europa League.

On 17 March 2022, he signed four-years deal with the club.

==== Boluspor (loan) ====
On 10 September 2020, Gümüşkaya was loaned to TFF 1. Lig club Boluspor for the 2020–21 season.

==== Giresunspor (loan) ====
On 4 February 2022, Gümüşkaya was loaned to Süper Lig club Giresunspor for the rest of the season.

=== Westerlo ===
On 23 August 2022, Gümüşkaya signed a four-year contract with Westerlo in Belgium.

On 25 September 2022, he made his debut with the team in a Croky Cup match against Eendracht Aalst and scored one goal in 3–1 win.

On 1 October 2022, he made his Belgian Pro League debut with the club in a 2–0 win over Zulte Waregem in home game.

==== Samsunspor (loan) ====
On 13 September 2023, he moved on a season-long loan to Samsunspor in 2023–24 season.

==== Gaziantep (loan) ====
On 29 January 2025, Gümüşkaya was loaned to Gaziantep until the end of the season, with an option to buy.

== International career ==
Gümüşkaya is a youth international for Turkey, having represented the U15's, U17's, U18's and U19's. He represented the Turkey U23's in their winning campaign at the 2021 Islamic Solidarity Games.

== Style of play ==
Gümüşkaya is a modern midfielder known for his strong passing and shots from outside the box. He is known for his excellent technique. His most natural role is as playmaker, and he is noted for this strong frame. Aside from midfielder, he can also play as a winger.

== Career statistics ==
As of 9 November 2024

Appearances and goals by club, season and competition
Club	Season	League			Cup (Note: Includes Turkish Cup and Croky Cup)		Europe		Other		Total	
Club	Season	Division	Apps	Goals	Apps	Goals	Apps	Goals	Apps	Goals	Apps	Goals
Fenerbahçe	2018–19	Süper Lig	0	0	0	0	—		29 (Note: Appearances in U21 Ligi)	4	29	4
Fenerbahçe	2019–20	Süper Lig	1	0	3	0	—		15	8	19	8
Fenerbahçe	2021–22	Süper Lig	11	0	1	0	6 (Note: Appearances in UEFA Europa League)	1	—		18	1
Fenerbahçe	Total		12	0	4	0	6	1	44	12	66	13
Boluspor (loan)	2020–21	TFF First League	20	4	2	0	—		—		22	4
Giresunspor (loan)	2021–22	Süper Lig	14	2	0	0	—		—		14	2
Westerlo	2022–23	Jupiler Pro League	15 (Note: 5 appearances in Jupiler Pro League Europe Play-Offs)	0	2	1	—		—		17	1
Westerlo	2023–24	Jupiler Pro League	3	0	0	0	—		—		3	0
Westerlo	2024–25	Jupiler Pro League	3	1	1	0	—		—		4	1
Westerlo	Total		21	0	3	1	0	0	0	0	24	1
Samsunspor (loan)	2023–24	Süper Lig	11	0	3	1	—		—		14	1
Career total			78	7	12	2	6	1	44	12	140	22

== Honours ==
Turkey U23

- Islamic Solidarity Games: 2021
