= 2021–22 UEFA Europa League qualifying =

Union of European Football Associations matches

The 2021–22 UEFA Europa League qualifying phase and play-off round began on 3 August and ended on 26 August 2021.

A total of 28 teams competed in the qualifying system of the 2021–22 UEFA Europa League, which included the qualifying phase, with 10 teams in Champions Path and six teams in Main Path, and the play-off round. The 10 winners in the play-off round advanced to the group stage, to join the 12 teams that entered in the group stage, the six losers of the Champions League play-off round (four from Champions Path and two from League Path), and the four League Path losers of the Champions League third qualifying round.

Times are CEST (UTC+2), as listed by UEFA (local times, if different, are in parentheses).

== Teams ==
In the third qualifying round, the teams were divided into two paths:

- Champions Path (10 teams): 10 teams which entered this round (10 losers of the Champions League Champions Path second qualifying round).
- Main Path (6 teams): 6 teams which entered this round (including 3 losers of the Champions League League Path second qualifying round).

The winners of the third qualifying round were combined into a single path for the play-off round:

- Play-off round (20 teams): 12 teams which entered this round (including 6 losers of the Champions League Champions Path third qualifying round), and 8 winners of the third qualifying round.

All teams eliminated from the qualifying phase and play-off round entered the Europa Conference League:

- The 5 losers of the Champions Path third qualifying round entered the Champions Path play-off round.
- The 3 losers of the Main Path third qualifying round entered the Main Path play-off round.
- The 10 losers of the play-off round entered the group stage.

Below were the participating teams (with their 2021 UEFA club coefficients, not to be used as seeding for qualifying phase and play-off round, however), grouped by their starting rounds.

Key to colours
Winners of play-off round advanced to group stage
Losers of play-off round entered Europa Conference League group stage
Losers of third qualifying round entered Europa Conference League play-off round

Play-off round
Team	Coeff.
(Czech Republic) Slavia Prague	43.500
(Greece) Olympiacos	43.000
(Serbia) Red Star Belgrade	32.500
(Scotland) Rangers	31.250
(Netherlands) AZ	21.500
(Turkey) Fenerbahçe	19.500
(Romania) CFR Cluj	16.500
(Poland) Legia Warsaw	16.500
(Ukraine) Zorya Luhansk	15.000
(Belgium) Antwerp	10.500
(Austria) Sturm Graz	7.165
(Denmark) Randers	5.575

Third qualifying round (Champions Path)
Team	Coeff.
(Slovakia) Slovan Bratislava	7.500
(Lithuania) Žalgiris	6.500
(Armenia) Alashkert	6.500
(Estonia) Flora	6.250
(Kazakhstan) Kairat	6.000
(Gibraltar) Lincoln Red Imps	5.750
(Cyprus) Omonia	5.550
(Finland) HJK	5.500
(Azerbaijan) Neftçi	5.000
(Slovenia) Mura	3.000

Third qualifying round (Main Path)
Team	Coeff.
(Scotland) Celtic	34.000
(Austria) Rapid Wien	17.000
(Turkey) Galatasaray	17.000
(Czech Republic) Jablonec	7.000
(Scotland) St Johnstone	6.675
(Cyprus) Anorthosis Famagusta	5.550

Notes

1. ^{CH Q3} Losers of Champions League third qualifying round (Champions Path).
2. ^{CH Q2} Losers of Champions League second qualifying round (Champions Path).
3. ^{LP Q2} Losers of Champions League second qualifying round (League Path).

== Format ==
Each tie was played over two legs, with each team playing one leg at home. The team that scored more goals on aggregate over the two legs advanced to the next round. If the aggregate score was level at the end of normal time of the second leg, the away goals rule was no longer applied starting from this season. To decide the winner of the tie, extra time was played, and if the same number of goals were scored by both teams during extra time, the tie was decided by a penalty shoot-out.

== Schedule ==
The schedule of the competition was as follows (all draws were held at the UEFA headquarters in Nyon, Switzerland).

Schedule for the qualifying phase of the 2021–22 UEFA Europa League
Round	Draw date	First leg	Second leg
Third qualifying round	19 July 2021	5 August 2021	12 August 2021
Play-offs	2 August 2021	19 August 2021	26 August 2021

== Third qualifying round ==
The draw for the third qualifying round was held on 19 July 2021, 13:00 CEST.

=== Seeding ===
A total of 16 teams played in the third qualifying round. They were divided into two paths:

- Champions Path (10 teams): 10 losers of the 2021–22 UEFA Champions League second qualifying round (Champions Path), whose identity was not known at the time of draw. There was no seeding. Due to political reasons, teams from Azerbaijan and Armenia could not be drawn against each other, thus the losers of the ties between Neftçi Baku/Olympiacos and Alashkert/Sheriff Tiraspol could not be drawn against each other.
- Main Path (6 teams): The teams were seeded as following:
  - Seeded: 3 teams which entered in this round.
  - Unseeded: 3 losers of the 2021–22 UEFA Champions League second qualifying round (League Path), whose identity was not known at the time of draw. Teams from the same association could not be drawn against each other, thus the following teams could not be drawn against each other:
    - Scotland: St Johnstone and the loser of the tie between Celtic/Midtjylland
    - Czech Republic: Jablonec and the loser of the tie between Sparta Prague/Rapid Wien

The first team drawn in each tie would be the home team of the first leg.

Champions Path
- (Cyprus) Omonia
- (Azerbaijan) Neftçi
- (Slovakia) Slovan Bratislava
- (Kazakhstan) Kairat
- (Slovenia) Mura
- (Finland) HJK
- (Gibraltar) Lincoln Red Imps
- (Estonia) Flora
- (Armenia) Alashkert
- (Lithuania) Žalgiris

Main Path
Seeded	Unseeded
(Czech Republic) Jablonec; (Scotland) St Johnstone; (Cyprus) Anorthosis Famagusta	(Scotland) Celtic; (Turkey) Galatasaray; (Austria) Rapid Wien

=== Summary ===
The first legs were played on 3 and 5 August, and the second legs were played on 10 and 12 August 2021.

The winners of the ties advanced to the play-off round. The losers were transferred to the Europa Conference League play-off round of their respective path.

Team 1	Agg.	Team 2	1st leg	2nd leg
Champions Path
Omonia (Cyprus)	2–2 (5–4 p)	(Estonia) Flora	1–0	1–2 (a.e.t.)
Mura (Slovenia)	1–0	(Lithuania) Žalgiris	0–0	1–0
Kairat (Kazakhstan)	2–3	(Armenia) Alashkert	0–0	2–3 (a.e.t.)
Lincoln Red Imps (Gibraltar)	2–4	(Slovakia) Slovan Bratislava	1–3	1–1
Neftçi (Azerbaijan)	2–5	(Finland) HJK	2–2	0–3
Main Path
Jablonec (Czech Republic)	2–7	(Scotland) Celtic	2–4	0–3
Rapid Wien (Austria)	4–2	(Cyprus) Anorthosis Famagusta	3–0	1–2
Galatasaray (Turkey)	5–3	(Scotland) St Johnstone	1–1	4–2

=== Champions Path matches ===
5 August 2021
18:00 (19:00 UTC+3)

Omonia (Cyprus)	1–0	(Estonia) Flora
Tzionis 12'	Report

GSP Stadium, Strovolos
Attendance: 8,033
Referee: Radu Petrescu (Romania)
10 August 2021
18:00 (19:00 UTC+3)

Flora (Estonia)	2–1 (a.e.t.)	(Cyprus) Omonia
Sappinen 48', 88'	Report	Kakoullis 43'
Penalties
Ojamaa (penalty scored); Zenjov (penalty scored); Lilander (penalty scored); Lukka (penalty missed); Alliku (penalty scored); Reinkort (penalty missed)	4–5	(penalty scored) Gómez; (penalty scored) Papoulis; (penalty scored) Atiemwen; (penalty scored) Psaltis; (penalty missed) Lang; (penalty scored) Yuste

A. Le Coq Arena, Tallinn
Attendance: 1,560
Referee: Ivan Kružliak (Slovakia)

2–2 on aggregate; Omonia won 5–4 on penalties.

5 August 2021
20:00

Mura (Slovenia)	0–0	(Lithuania) Žalgiris
	Report

Fazanerija, Murska Sobota
Attendance: 2,500
Referee: Andreas Ekberg (Sweden)
12 August 2021
19:00 (20:00 UTC+3)

Žalgiris (Lithuania)	0–1	(Slovenia) Mura
	Report	Kous 12'

LFF Stadium, Vilnius
Attendance: 2,921
Referee: Bartosz Frankowski (Poland)

Mura won 1–0 on aggregate.

5 August 2021
16:00 (20:00 UTC+6)

Kairat (Kazakhstan)	0–0	(Armenia) Alashkert
	Report

Almaty Central Stadium, Almaty
Attendance: 0 (Note: Due to the COVID-19 pandemic in Europe, the match was played behind closed doors.)
Referee: Aleksei Kulbakov (Belarus)
12 August 2021
17:00 (19:00 UTC+4)

Alashkert (Armenia)	3–2 (a.e.t.)	(Kazakhstan) Kairat
Embaló 43', 50'; Glišić 104'	Report	Abiken 45+1'; Shushenachev 61'

Vazgen Sargsyan Republican Stadium, Yerevan (Note: Alashkert played their home matches at Vazgen Sargsyan Republican Stadium, Yerevan, instead of their regular stadium Alashkert Stadium, Yerevan, which did not meet UEFA requirements.)
Attendance: 7,000
Referee: Lawrence Visser (Belgium)

Alashkert won 3–2 on aggregate.

5 August 2021
18:00

Lincoln Red Imps (Gibraltar)	1–3	(Slovakia) Slovan Bratislava
Walker 73' (pen.)	Report	Kashia 16'; Zmrhal 48'; Henty 69'

Victoria Stadium, Gibraltar
Attendance: 637
Referee: Athanasios Tzilos (Greece)
10 August 2021
20:30

Slovan Bratislava (Slovakia)	1–1	(Gibraltar) Lincoln Red Imps
Zmrhal 38'	Report	K. Gómez 90'

Tehelné pole, Bratislava
Attendance: 4,688
Referee: Mykola Balakin (Ukraine)

Slovan Bratislava won 4–2 on aggregate.

3 August 2021
19:00 (21:00 UTC+4)

Neftçi (Azerbaijan)	2–2	(Finland) HJK
Bougrine 59'; Mahmudov 80'	Report	Ro. Riski 61'; Jair 65'

Eighth Kilometer District Stadium, Baku
Attendance: 3,500
Referee: William Collum (Scotland)
12 August 2021
18:00 (19:00 UTC+3)

HJK (Finland)	3–0	(Azerbaijan) Neftçi
Ri. Riski 46'; Ro. Riski 60' (pen.), 89'	Report

Bolt Arena, Helsinki
Attendance: 4,068
Referee: Deniz Aytekin (Germany)

HJK won 5–2 on aggregate.

=== Main Path matches ===
5 August 2021
17:45

Jablonec (Czech Republic)	2–4	(Scotland) Celtic
Pilař 17'; Bitton 85' (o.g.)	Report	Abada 12'; Furuhashi 16'; Forrest 64'; Christie 90'

Stadion Střelnice, Jablonec nad Nisou
Attendance: 4,805
Referee: Halil Umut Meler (Turkey)
12 August 2021
20:45 (19:45 UTC+1)

Celtic (Scotland)	3–0	(Czech Republic) Jablonec
Turnbull 26', 62'; Forrest 70'	Report

Celtic Park, Glasgow
Attendance: 50,076
Referee: Daniel Siebert (Germany)

Celtic won 7–2 on aggregate.

5 August 2021
20:30

Rapid Wien (Austria)	3–0	(Cyprus) Anorthosis Famagusta
Kara 35'; Fountas 65'; Grüll 83'	Report

Allianz Stadion, Vienna
Attendance: 11,400
Referee: Maurizio Mariani (Italy)
12 August 2021
19:00 (20:00 UTC+3)

Anorthosis Famagusta (Cyprus)	2–1	(Austria) Rapid Wien
Lafferty 45+1'; Roushias 88'	Report	Kara 64'

Antonis Papadopoulos Stadium, Larnaca
Attendance: 3,574
Referee: Aleksandar Stavrev (North Macedonia)

Rapid Wien won 4–2 on aggregate.

5 August 2021
20:00 (21:00 UTC+3)

Galatasaray (Turkey)	1–1	(Scotland) St Johnstone
Boey 60'	Report	Kerr 58' (pen.)

Başakşehir Fatih Terim Stadium, Istanbul (Note: Galatasaray played their third qualifying round home match at Başakşehir Fatih Terim Stadium in Istanbul, instead of their regular stadium Türk Telekom Stadium, also in Istanbul, due to renovation.)
Attendance: 6,216
Referee: Sandro Schärer (Switzerland)
12 August 2021
20:00 (19:00 UTC+1)

St Johnstone (Scotland)	2–4	(Turkey) Galatasaray
Çipe 37' (o.g.); O'Halloran 90+4'	Report	Diagne 30'; Aktürkoğlu 64'; Feghouli 70'; Kılınç 90+2'

McDiarmid Park, Perth
Attendance: 9,106
Referee: Andris Treimanis (Latvia)

Galatasaray won 5–3 on aggregate.

== Play-off round ==
The draw for the play-off round was held on 2 August 2021, 13:00 CEST.

=== Seeding ===
A total of 20 teams played in the play-off round. The teams were seeded into four "priority groups":

- Priority 1: 6 teams which entered in this round.
- Priority 2: 6 losers of the 2021–22 UEFA Champions League third qualifying round (Champions Path), whose identity was not known at the time of the draw
- Priority 3: 5 winners of the third qualifying round (Champions Path), whose identity was not known at the time of the draw
- Priority 4: 3 winners of the third qualifying round (Main Path), whose identity was not known at the time of the draw

The procedure of the draw was as follows:

1. The three teams of priority 4 were drawn against teams of priority 1 to produce three ties, until there were no more teams of priority 4 left.
2. The remaining three teams of priority 1 were drawn against teams of priority 3 to produce three ties, until there were no more teams of priority 1 left.
3. The remaining two teams of priority 3 were drawn against teams of priority 2 to produce two ties, until there were no more teams of priority 3 left.
4. The remaining four teams of priority 2 were drawn against each other to produce two ties.

There was no country protection for this round, thus teams from the same association could be drawn against each other. The first team drawn in each tie would be the home team of the first leg.

Priority 1	Priority 2	Priority 3	Priority 4
(Netherlands) AZ; (Turkey) Fenerbahçe; (Ukraine) Zorya Luhansk; (Belgium) Antwerp; (Austria) Sturm Graz; (Denmark) Randers	(Poland) Legia Warsaw; (Czech Republic) Slavia Prague; (Greece) Olympiacos; (Romania) CFR Cluj; (Scotland) Rangers; (Serbia) Red Star Belgrade	(Slovakia) Slovan Bratislava; (Slovenia) Mura; (Armenia) Alashkert; (Cyprus) Omonia; (Finland) HJK	(Scotland) Celtic; (Austria) Rapid Wien; (Turkey) Galatasaray

=== Summary ===
The first legs were played on 17, 18 and 19 August, and the second legs were played on 26 August 2021.

The winners of the ties advanced to the group stage. The losers were transferred to the Europa Conference League group stage.

Team 1	Agg.	Team 2	1st leg	2nd leg
Randers (Denmark)	2–3	(Turkey) Galatasaray	1–1	1–2
Rapid Wien (Austria)	6–2	(Ukraine) Zorya Luhansk	3–0	3–2
Celtic (Scotland)	3–2	(Netherlands) AZ	2–0	1–2
Fenerbahçe (Turkey)	6–2	(Finland) HJK	1–0	5–2
Mura (Slovenia)	1–5	(Austria) Sturm Graz	1–3	0–2
Omonia (Cyprus)	4–4 (2–3 p)	(Belgium) Antwerp	4–2	0–2 (a.e.t.)
Olympiacos (Greece)	5–2	(Slovakia) Slovan Bratislava	3–0	2–2
Rangers (Scotland)	1–0	(Armenia) Alashkert	1–0	0–0
Slavia Prague (Czech Republic)	3–4	(Poland) Legia Warsaw	2–2	1–2
Red Star Belgrade (Serbia)	6–1	(Romania) CFR Cluj	4–0	2–1

=== Matches ===
19 August 2021
19:00

Randers (Denmark)	1–1	(Turkey) Galatasaray
Lauenborg 54'	Report	Aktürkoğlu 26'

Randers Stadium, Randers
Attendance: 7,064
Referee: Jesús Gil Manzano (Spain)
26 August 2021
20:00 (21:00 UTC+3)

Galatasaray (Turkey)	2–1	(Denmark) Randers
Van Aanholt 48'; Lauenborg 59' (o.g.)	Report	Egho 11'

Recep Tayyip Erdoğan Stadium, Istanbul (Note: Galatasaray played their play-off round home match at Recep Tayyip Erdoğan Stadium in Istanbul, instead of their regular stadium Türk Telekom Stadium, also in Istanbul, due to renovation.)
Attendance: 3,947
Referee: Aleksei Kulbakov (Belarus)

Galatasaray won 3–2 on aggregate.

19 August 2021
21:00

Rapid Wien (Austria)	3–0	(Ukraine) Zorya Luhansk
Fountas 29'; Kara 78'; Grüll 85'	Report

Allianz Stadion, Vienna
Attendance: 10,300
Referee: Sandro Schärer (Switzerland)
26 August 2021
18:30 (19:30 UTC+3)

Zorya Luhansk (Ukraine)	2–3	(Austria) Rapid Wien
Hladkyy 40'; Zahedi 87' (pen.)	Report	Grüll 10'; Greiml 15'; Fountas 68'

Slavutych-Arena, Zaporizhzhia (Note: Zorya Luhansk played their home match at Slavutych-Arena, Zaporizhzhia, instead of their regular stadium Avanhard Stadium, Luhansk, due to the war conditions in Eastern Ukraine.)
Attendance: 2,563
Referee: István Kovács (Romania)

Rapid Wien won 6–2 on aggregate.

18 August 2021
20:45 (19:45 UTC+1)

Celtic (Scotland)	2–0	(Netherlands) AZ
Furuhashi 12'; Letschert 61' (o.g.)	Report

Celtic Park, Glasgow
Attendance: 52,916
Referee: Ovidiu Haţegan (Romania)
26 August 2021
20:15

AZ (Netherlands)	2–1	(Scotland) Celtic
Aboukhlal 6'; Starfelt 26' (o.g.)	Report	Furuhashi 3'

AFAS Stadion, Alkmaar
Attendance: 10,041
Referee: Tiago Martins (Portugal)

Celtic won 3–2 on aggregate.

19 August 2021
20:45 (21:45 UTC+3)

Fenerbahçe (Turkey)	1–0	(Finland) HJK
Gümüşkaya 65'	Report

Şükrü Saracoğlu Stadium, Istanbul
Attendance: 6,769
Referee: Benoît Bastien (France)
26 August 2021
18:00 (19:00 UTC+3)

HJK (Finland)	2–5	(Turkey) Fenerbahçe
Ro. Riski 27'; Ri. Riski 88'	Report	Valencia 11', 14', 52'; Şanlıtürk 90+2'; Peltola 90+4' (o.g.)

Bolt Arena, Helsinki
Attendance: 3,785
Referee: Ivan Kružliak (Slovakia)

Fenerbahçe won 6–2 on aggregate.

19 August 2021
20:00

Mura (Slovenia)	1–3	(Austria) Sturm Graz
Škoflek 3'	Report	Jantscher 18' (pen.); Kiteishvili 60'; Yeboah 63'

Fazanerija, Murska Sobota
Attendance: 4,000
Referee: Michael Oliver (England)
26 August 2021
21:00

Sturm Graz (Austria)	2–0	(Slovenia) Mura
Kiteishvili 39'; Jantscher 66'	Report

Liebenauer Stadium, Graz
Attendance: 8,237
Referee: José María Sánchez (Spain)

Sturm Graz won 5–1 on aggregate.

19 August 2021
18:00 (19:00 UTC+3)

Omonia (Cyprus)	4–2	(Belgium) Antwerp
Loizou 43', 56'; Kakoullis 49'; Atiemwen 84' (pen.)	Report	Benson 26'; Miyoshi 62'

GSP Stadium, Nicosia
Attendance: 7,585
Referee: Andreas Ekberg (Sweden)
26 August 2021
21:00

Antwerp (Belgium)	2–0 (a.e.t.)	(Cyprus) Omonia
Miyoshi 28'; Gerkens 84'	Report
Penalties
B. Verstraete (penalty scored); Gerkens (penalty missed); Eggestein (penalty scored); Miyoshi (penalty scored)	3–2	(penalty missed) Gómez; (penalty scored) Atiemwen; (penalty missed) Lecjaks; (penalty scored) Yuste; (penalty missed) Zachariou

Bosuilstadion, Antwerp
Attendance: 10,470
Referee: Andris Treimanis (Latvia)

4–4 on aggregate; Antwerp won 3–2 on penalties.

19 August 2021
21:00 (22:00 UTC+3)

Olympiacos (Greece)	3–0	(Slovakia) Slovan Bratislava
M. Camara 37'; Cissé 52'; Bozhikov 68' (o.g.)	Report

Karaiskakis Stadium, Piraeus
Attendance: 9,823
Referee: Marco Guida (Italy)
26 August 2021
20:45

Slovan Bratislava (Slovakia)	2–2	(Greece) Olympiacos
Henty 42'; Green 62'	Report	El-Arabi 33'; Onyekuru 54'

Tehelné pole, Bratislava
Attendance: 7,201
Referee: Deniz Aytekin (Germany)

Olympiacos won 5–2 on aggregate.

19 August 2021
21:00 (20:00 UTC+1)

Rangers (Scotland)	1–0	(Armenia) Alashkert
Morelos 67'	Report

Ibrox Stadium, Glasgow
Attendance: 42,649
Referee: Anastasios Sidiropoulos (Greece)
26 August 2021
17:00 (19:00 UTC+4)

Alashkert (Armenia)	0–0	(Scotland) Rangers
	Report

Vazgen Sargsyan Republican Stadium, Yerevan
Attendance: 6,800
Referee: Tobias Stieler (Germany)

Rangers won 1–0 on aggregate.

19 August 2021
19:00

Slavia Prague (Czech Republic)	2–2	(Poland) Legia Warsaw
Bah 33'; Masopust 45+3'	Report	Emreli 20'; Juranović 37'

Sinobo Stadium, Prague
Attendance: 14,543
Referee: Felix Zwayer (Germany)
26 August 2021
21:00

Legia Warsaw (Poland)	2–1	(Czech Republic) Slavia Prague
Emreli 59', 70'	Report	Ekpai 45'

Stadion Wojska Polskiego, Warsaw
Attendance: 20,641
Referee: Artur Soares Dias (Portugal)

Legia Warsaw won 4–3 on aggregate.

17 August 2021
21:00

Red Star Belgrade (Serbia)	4–0	(Romania) CFR Cluj
Pavkov 5'; Katai 38'; Ben 68'; Ivanić 77'	Report

Red Star Stadium, Belgrade
Attendance: 22,482
Referee: Georgi Kabakov (Bulgaria)
26 August 2021
20:30 (21:30 UTC+3)

CFR Cluj (Romania)	1–2	(Serbia) Red Star Belgrade
Debeljuh 34'	Report	Katai 5' (pen.); Pavkov 53'

Dr. Constantin Rădulescu, Cluj-Napoca
Attendance: 4,200
Referee: Michael Oliver (England)

Red Star Belgrade won 6–1 on aggregate.
