= Nazım Sangaré =

Turkish footballer

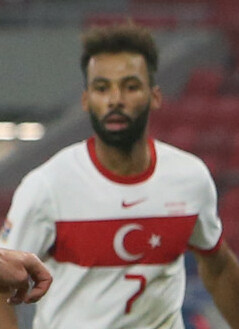
- Sangaré in 2020

Personal information
- Date of birth: 30 May 1994 (age 32)
- Place of birth: Cologne, Germany
- Height: 1.85 m (6 ft 1 in)
- Position: Right-back

Team information
- Current team: Gaziantep
- Number: 30

Youth career
- Viktoria Thorr
- –2008: Bedburger BV
- 2008–2012: Alemannia Aachen
- 2012–2013: Borussia Mönchengladbach

Senior career*
Years	Team	Apps	(Gls)
2013–2014	Alemannia Aachen	21	(1)
2014–2016	Fortuna Düsseldorf II	50	(11)
2016–2017	VfL Osnabrück	38	(2)
2017–2020	Antalyaspor	75	(3)
2020–2023	Fenerbahçe	39	(2)
2023–2024	Fatih Karagümrük	25	(1)
2024–2025	Göztepe	20	(0)
2025–	Gaziantep	15	(0)

International career^{‡}
2019–2020	Turkey	6	(0)
- * Club domestic league appearances and goals as of 10 June 2026 ‡ National team caps and goals as of 22:21, 9 February 2021 (UTC)

Nazım Sangaré (born 30 May 1994) is a professional footballer who plays as a right-back for Süper Lig club Gaziantep.

== Club career ==
On 13 November 2025, Sangaré was banned from playing for 45 days for his involvement in the 2025 Turkish football betting scandal.

== International career ==
Sangaré was born in Germany to a Turkish mother from Eskişehir and a father from Guinea. He was called up to the Turkey national team on 24 May 2019. He made his debut on 30 May 2019, in a friendly against Greece, as a starter.

== Career statistics ==
=== Club ===
As of match played 28 October 2022

Appearances and goals by club, season and competition
Club	Season	League			Cup (Note: Includes DFB-Pokal and Turkish Cup)		Europe		Other		Total	
Club	Season	Division	Apps	Goals	Apps	Goals	Apps	Goals	Apps	Goals	Apps	Goals
Alemannia Aachen	2013-14	Regionalliga West	21	1	—		—		10 (Note: Appearances in Youth League)	6	31	7
Fortuna Düsseldorf II	2014-15	Regionalliga West	17	1	—		—		—		17	1
Fortuna Düsseldorf II	2015-16	Regionalliga West	33	10	—		—		—		33	10
Fortuna Düsseldorf II	Total		71	12	—		—		—		81	18
Osnabrück	2016–17	3. Liga	32	2	—		—		4	0	36	2
Osnabrück	2017–18	3. Liga	6	0	1	0	—		—		7	0
Osnabrück	Total		38	2	1	0	—		4	0	43	2
Antalyaspor	2017–18	Süper Lig	19	0	5	0	—		—		24	0
Antalyaspor	2018–19	Süper Lig	32	2	0	0	—		—		32	2
Antalyaspor	2019–20	Süper Lig	23	1	1	0	—		—		24	1
Antalyaspor	2020–21	Süper Lig	1	0	0	0	—		—		1	0
Antalyaspor	Total		75	3	6	0	—		—		81	3
Fenerbahçe	2020–21	Süper Lig	19	1	2	0	—		—		21	1
Fenerbahçe	2021–22	Süper Lig	20	1	2	0	7 (Note: Five appearances in UEFA Europa League, two appearances in UEFA Europa Conference League)	0	—		29	1
Fenerbahçe	2022–23	Süper Lig	0	0	0	0	0	0	—		0	0
Fenerbahçe	Total		39	2	4	0	7	0	—		50	2
Fatih Karagümrük	2023–24	Süper Lig	3	1	0	0	—		—		3	1
Career total			226	20	11	0	7	0	14	6	256	26

=== International ===
As of match played 9 February 2021

Appearances and goals by national team and year
National team	Year	Apps	Goals
Turkey	2019	2	0
Turkey	2020	4	0
Total		6	0

== Honours ==
Fenerbahçe

- Turkish Cup: 2022–23
