= Çağtay Kurukalıp =

Turkish footballer (born 2002)

Personal information
- Date of birth: 24 February 2002 (age 24)
- Place of birth: Gaziosmanpaşa, Turkey
- Height: 1.72 m (5 ft 8 in)
- Position: Left back

Team information
- Current team: Fatih Karagümrük
- Number: 33

Youth career
- 2014–2020: Kasımpaşa

Senior career*
Years	Team	Apps	(Gls)
2020–2021	Kasımpaşa	0	(0)
2021–2024	Fenerbahçe	2	(0)
2023	→ Iğdır (loan)	9	(0)
2023–2024	→ İskenderunspor (loan)	30	(1)
2024–	Fatih Karagümrük	60	(0)

International career^{‡}
2017–2018	Turkey U16	12	(0)
2018–2019	Turkey U17	21	(0)
2019–2020	Turkey U18	10	(0)
- * Club domestic league appearances and goals as of 1 June 2026 ‡ National team caps and goals as of 20:30, 17 May 2022 (UTC)

Çağtay Kurukalıp (born 24 February 2002) is a Turkish football player who plays as a defender for Turkish club Fatih Karagümrük.

== Professional career ==
Kurukalıp is a youth product of Kasımpaşa since 2014, and signed his first professional contract with them in 2018, which resulted in keeping him at the club for 3 years. He made his professional debut with Kasımpaşa in a 3-1 Turkish Cup loss to Alanyaspor on 15 January 2020. On 30 June 2021, he signed a three-year contract with Fenerbahçe.

On 7 January 2023, Kurukalıp joined Iğdır on loan.

== International career ==
Kurukalıp is a youth international for Turkey, having represented the Turkey U16s, U17s and U18.
