= 2021–22 UEFA Europa League =

European football tournament

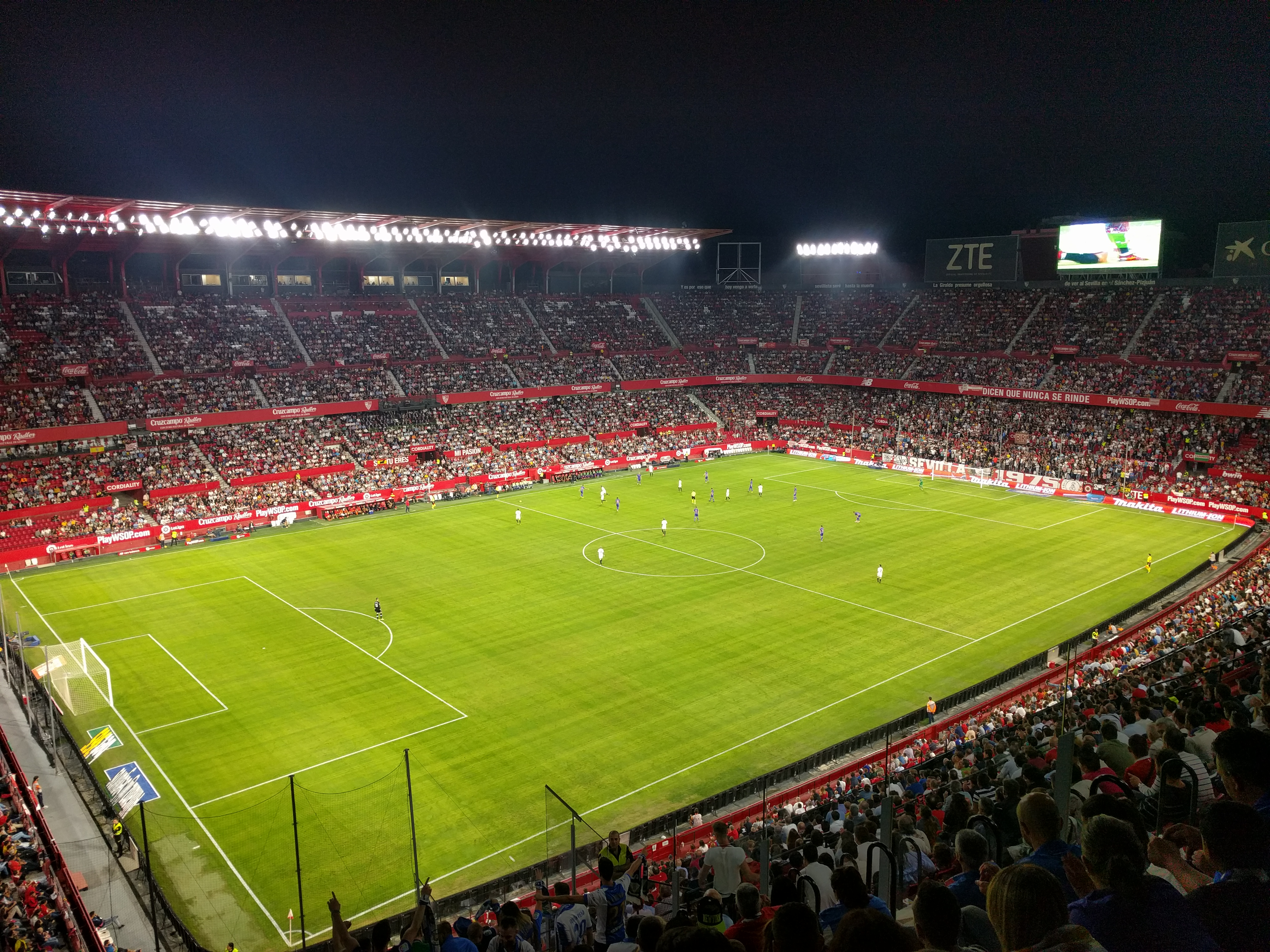
- The Estadio Ramón Sánchez Pizjuán in Seville hosted the final

Tournament details
- Dates: Qualifying: 3–26 August 2021; Competition proper: 15 September 2021 – 18 May 2022
- Teams: Competition proper: 32+8; Total: 21+37 (from 33 associations)

Final positions
- Champions: (Germany) Eintracht Frankfurt (2nd title)
- Runners-up: (Scotland) Rangers

Tournament statistics
- Matches played: 139
- Goals scored: 367 (2.64 per match)
- Attendance: 3,435,542 (24,716 per match)
- Top scorer(s): James Tavernier (Rangers); 7 goals
- Best player: Filip Kostić (Eintracht Frankfurt)
- Best young player: Ansgar Knauff (Eintracht Frankfurt)

The 2021–22 UEFA Europa League was the 51st season of Europe's secondary club football tournament organised by UEFA, and the 13th season since it was renamed from the UEFA Cup to the UEFA Europa League.

Eintracht Frankfurt defeated Rangers 5–4 on penalties following a 1–1 draw after extra time in the final played at the Estadio Ramón Sánchez Pizjuán in Seville, Spain, winning the competition for the second time in club history, and the first since 1980. The final was originally scheduled to be played at the Puskás Aréna in Budapest, Hungary. However, due to the postponement and relocation of the 2020 final, the final hosts were shifted back a year, with Budapest instead hosting the 2023 final. As winners, Eintracht Frankfurt automatically qualified for the 2022–23 UEFA Champions League group stage, and also earned the right to play against the winners of the 2021–22 UEFA Champions League, Real Madrid, in the 2022 UEFA Super Cup.

This season was the first since 1999–2000 (the first season after the dissolution of the UEFA Cup Winners' Cup) where three major European club competitions (UEFA Champions League, UEFA Europa League, and the newly created UEFA Europa Conference League) take place, and the first outright where the Europa League (then the UEFA Cup) is the secondary competition of the three. As a result, major changes to the format of the Europa League were made. The number of teams in the group stage was reduced from 48 to 32 teams, and the number of teams participating in qualifying was also reduced significantly. The first round of the knockout phase also now involved only the group stage runners-up and the Champions League third-placed teams, with the group winners directly advancing to the round of 16.

As the title holders Villarreal qualified for the 2021–22 UEFA Champions League, they were unable to defend their title as they advanced to the Champions League knockout stage, and were eliminated by Liverpool in the semi-finals.

On 24 June 2021, UEFA approved the proposal to abolish the away goals rule in all UEFA club competitions, which had been used since 1965. Therefore, if in a two-legged tie, two teams scored the same number of aggregate goals, the winner of tie was not decided by the number of away goals scored by each team, but always by 30 minutes of extra time, and if the two teams scored the same number of goals in extra time, the winner was decided by a penalty shoot-out.

== Association team allocation ==
A total of 58 teams from 33 of the 55 UEFA member associations participated in the 2021–22 UEFA Europa League. Among them, 16 associations had teams directly qualifying for the Europa League, while for the other 39 associations that did not have any teams directly qualifying, 17 of them had teams playing after being transferred from the Champions League (the only member association which could not have a participant was Liechtenstein, which did not organise a domestic league, and could only enter their cup winner into the Europa Conference League given their association ranking). The association ranking based on the UEFA country coefficients was used to determine the number of participating teams for each association:

- Associations 1–5 each had two teams qualify.
- Associations 6–15 each had one team qualify.
  - As the UEFA Europa Conference League title holders' berth was not used this season, association 16 had one of their teams promoted from the Europa Conference League to the Europa League, so they also had one team qualify.
- Moreover, 37 teams eliminated from the 2021–22 UEFA Champions League were transferred to the Europa League.
- In future seasons, the title holders of the UEFA Europa Conference League would be given an additional entry in the Europa League. However, this berth was not used for this season as the first edition of the UEFA Europa Conference League had not been held.

=== Association ranking ===
For the 2021–22 UEFA Europa League, the associations were allocated places according to their 2020 UEFA country coefficients, which took into account their performance in European competitions from 2015–16 to 2019–20.

Apart from the allocation based on the country coefficients, associations could have additional teams participating in the Europa League, as noted below:

- (UCL) – Additional teams transferred from the UEFA Champions League

Association ranking for 2021–22 UEFA Europa League

| Rank | Association | Coeff. | Teams | Notes |
|---|---|---|---|---|
| 1 | Spain | 102.283 | 2 | +2 (UCL) |
| 2 | England | 90.462 | 2 | |
| 3 | Germany | 74.784 | 2 | +2 (UCL) |
| 4 | Italy | 70.653 | 2 | +1 (UCL) |
| 5 | France | 59.248 | 2 | +1 (UCL) |
| 6 | Portugal | 49.449 | 1 | +1 (UCL) |
| 7 | Russia | 45.549 | 1 | +2 (UCL) |
| 8 | Belgium | 37.900 | 1 | +1 (UCL) |
| 9 | Ukraine | 36.100 | 1 | |
| 10 | Netherlands | 35.750 | 1 | +1 (UCL) |
| 11 | Turkey | 33.600 | 1 | +1 (UCL) |
| 12 | Austria | 32.925 | 1 | +1 (UCL) |
| 13 | Denmark | 29.250 | 1 | +2 (UCL) |
| 14 | Scotland | 27.875 | 1 | +2 (UCL) |
| 15 | Czech Republic | 27.300 | 1 | +2 (UCL) |
| 16 | Cyprus | 26.750 | 1 | +1 (UCL) |
| 17 | Switzerland | 26.400 | 0 | |
| 18 | Greece | 26.300 | 0 | +1 (UCL) |
| 19 | Serbia | 25.500 | 0 | +1 (UCL) |

| Rank | Association | Coeff. | Teams | Notes |
|---|---|---|---|---|
| 20 | Croatia | 24.875 | 0 | +1 (UCL) |
| 21 | Sweden | 22.750 | 0 | |
| 22 | Norway | 21.750 | 0 | |
| 23 | Israel | 19.625 | 0 | |
| 24 | Kazakhstan | 19.250 | 0 | +1 (UCL) |
| 25 | Belarus | 18.875 | 0 | |
| 26 | Azerbaijan | 18.750 | 0 | +1 (UCL) |
| 27 | Bulgaria | 17.375 | 0 | +1 (UCL) |
| 28 | Romania | 16.700 | 0 | +1 (UCL) |
| 29 | Poland | 16.625 | 0 | +1 (UCL) |
| 30 | Slovakia | 15.875 | 0 | +1 (UCL) |
| 31 | Liechtenstein | 13.500 | 0 | |
| 32 | Slovenia | 13.000 | 0 | +1 (UCL) |
| 33 | Hungary | 12.875 | 0 | +1 (UCL) |
| 34 | Luxembourg | 8.000 | 0 | |
| 35 | Lithuania | 7.875 | 0 | +1 (UCL) |
| 36 | Armenia | 7.625 | 0 | +1 (UCL) |
| 37 | Latvia | 7.625 | 0 | |

| Rank | Association | Coeff. | Teams | Notes |
|---|---|---|---|---|
| 38 | Albania | 7.375 | 0 | |
| 39 | North Macedonia | 7.375 | 0 | |
| 40 | Bosnia and Herzegovina | 6.875 | 0 | |
| 41 | Moldova | 6.750 | 0 | +1 (UCL) |
| 42 | Republic of Ireland | 6.700 | 0 | |
| 43 | Finland | 6.500 | 0 | +1 (UCL) |
| 44 | Georgia | 5.750 | 0 | |
| 45 | Malta | 5.750 | 0 | |
| 46 | Iceland | 5.375 | 0 | |
| 47 | Wales | 5.000 | 0 | |
| 48 | Northern Ireland | 4.875 | 0 | |
| 49 | Gibraltar | 4.750 | 0 | +1 (UCL) |
| 50 | Montenegro | 4.375 | 0 | |
| 51 | Estonia | 4.375 | 0 | +1 (UCL) |
| 52 | Kosovo | 4.000 | 0 | |
| 53 | Faroe Islands | 3.750 | 0 | |
| 54 | Andorra | 2.831 | 0 | |
| 55 | San Marino | 0.666 | 0 | |

=== Distribution ===
The following is the access list for this season. In the default access list, the title holders of the Europa Conference League qualified for the group stage. However, since this berth was not used for this season, the following changes to the access list were made:

- The cup winners of association 7 (Russia) enter the group stage instead of the play-off round.
- The cup winners of association 13 (Denmark) enter the play-off round instead of the third qualifying round.
- The cup winners of association 16 (Cyprus) enter the third qualifying round instead of the Europa Conference League second qualifying round.

Access list for 2021–22 UEFA Europa League
| | | Teams entering in this round | Teams advancing from previous round | Teams transferred from Champions League |
|---|---|---|---|---|
| Third qualifying round (16 teams) | Champions Path (10 teams) | | | 10 teams eliminated from Champions League second qualifying round (Champions Path) |
| Third qualifying round (16 teams) | Main Path (6 teams) | 3 domestic cup winners from association 14–16 | | 3 teams eliminated from Champions League second qualifying round (League Path) |
| Play-off round (20 teams) | | 6 domestic cup winners from associations 8–13 | 5 winners from the third qualifying round (Champions Path); 3 winners from the third qualifying round (Main Path) | 6 teams eliminated from Champions League third qualifying round (Champions Path) |
| Group stage (32 teams) | | 7 domestic cup winners from associations 1–7; 1 domestic league fourth-placed team from association 5; 4 domestic league fifth-placed teams from associations 1–4 | 10 winners from the play-off round | 4 teams eliminated from Champions League play-off round (Champions Path); 2 teams eliminated from Champions League play-off round (League Path); 4 teams eliminated from Champions League third qualifying round (League Path) |
| Preliminary knockout round (16 teams) | | | 8 group runners-up from the group stage | 8 group third-placed teams from Champions League group stage |
| Knockout phase (16 teams) | | | 8 group winners from the group stage; 8 winners from the preliminary knockout round | |

=== Teams ===
The labels in the parentheses show how each team qualified for the place of its starting round:

- CW: Cup winners
- 4th, 5th, etc.: League position of the previous season
- UCL: Transferred from the Champions League
  - GS: Third-placed teams from the group stage
  - CH/LP PO: Losers from the play-off round (Champions/League Path)
  - CH/LP Q3: Losers from the third qualifying round (Champions/League Path)
  - CH/LP Q2: Losers from the second qualifying round (Champions/League Path)

The third qualifying round was divided into Champions Path (CH) and Main Path (MP).

Qualified teams for 2021–22 UEFA Europa League
| Entry round | | Teams | | | |
|---|---|---|---|---|---|
| Knockout round play-offs | | (Germany) RB Leipzig (UCL GS) | (Portugal) Porto (UCL GS) | (Germany) Borussia Dortmund (UCL GS) | (Moldova) Sheriff Tiraspol (UCL GS) |
| Knockout round play-offs | | (Spain) Barcelona (UCL GS) | (Italy) Atalanta (UCL GS) | (Spain) Sevilla (UCL GS) | (Russia) Zenit Saint Petersburg (UCL GS) |
| Group stage | | (Spain) Real Sociedad (5th) | (Spain) Real Betis (6th) | (England) Leicester City (CW) | (England) West Ham United (6th) |
| Group stage | | (Germany) Eintracht Frankfurt (5th) | (Germany) Bayer Leverkusen (6th) | (Italy) Napoli (5th) | (Italy) Lazio (6th) |
| Group stage | | (France) Lyon (4th) | (France) Marseille (5th) | (Portugal) Braga (CW) | (Russia) Lokomotiv Moscow (CW) |
| Group stage | | (Denmark) Brøndby (UCL CH PO) | (Croatia) Dinamo Zagreb (UCL CH PO) | (Bulgaria) Ludogorets Razgrad (UCL CH PO) | (Hungary) Ferencváros (UCL CH PO) |
| Group stage | | (France) Monaco (UCL LP PO) | (Netherlands) PSV Eindhoven (UCL LP PO) | (Russia) Spartak Moscow (UCL LP Q3) | (Belgium) Genk (UCL LP Q3) |
| Group stage | | (Denmark) Midtjylland (UCL LP Q3) | (Czech Republic) Sparta Prague (UCL LP Q3) | | |
| Play-off round | | (Belgium) Antwerp (3rd) | (Ukraine) Zorya Luhansk (3rd) | (Netherlands) AZ (3rd) | (Turkey) Fenerbahçe (3rd) |
| Play-off round | | (Austria) Sturm Graz (3rd) | (Denmark) Randers (CW) | (Scotland) Rangers (UCL CH Q3) | (Czech Republic) Slavia Prague (UCL CH Q3) |
| Play-off round | | (Greece) Olympiacos (UCL CH Q3) | (Serbia) Red Star Belgrade (UCL CH Q3) | (Romania) CFR Cluj (UCL CH Q3) | (Poland) Legia Warsaw (UCL CH Q3) |
| Third qualifying round | CH | (Cyprus) Omonia (UCL CH Q2) | (Kazakhstan) Kairat (UCL CH Q2) | (Azerbaijan) Neftçi (UCL CH Q2) | (Slovakia) Slovan Bratislava (UCL CH Q2) |
| Third qualifying round | CH | (Slovenia) Mura (UCL CH Q2) | (Lithuania) Žalgiris (UCL CH Q2) | (Armenia) Alashkert (UCL CH Q2) | (Finland) HJK (UCL CH Q2) |
| Third qualifying round | CH | (Gibraltar) Lincoln Red Imps (UCL CH Q2) | (Estonia) Flora (UCL CH Q2) | | |
| Third qualifying round | MP | (Scotland) St Johnstone (CW) | (Czech Republic) Jablonec (3rd) | (Cyprus) Anorthosis Famagusta (CW) | (Turkey) Galatasaray (UCL LP Q2) |
| Third qualifying round | MP | (Austria) Rapid Wien (UCL LP Q2) | (Scotland) Celtic (UCL LP Q2) | | |

== Schedule ==
The schedule of the competition was as follows. Matches were scheduled for Thursdays apart from the final, which took place on a Wednesday, though exceptionally could take place on Tuesdays or Wednesdays due to scheduling conflicts. Scheduled kick-off times starting from the group stage were 18:45 (instead of 18:55 previously) and 21:00 CEST/CET, though exceptionally could take place at 16:30 due to geographical reasons.

All draws started at 13:00 or 13:30 CEST/CET and were held at the UEFA headquarters in Nyon, Switzerland. On 16 July 2021, UEFA announced that the group stage draw would be held in Istanbul, Turkey.

Schedule for 2021–22 UEFA Europa League
| Phase | Round | Draw date | First leg | Second leg |
|---|---|---|---|---|
| Qualifying | Third qualifying round | 19 July 2021 | 5 August 2021 | 12 August 2021 |
| Play-offs | Play-off round | 2 August 2021 | 19 August 2021 | 26 August 2021 |
| Group stage | Matchday 1 | 27 August 2021 | 16 September 2021 | |
| Group stage | Matchday 2 | 27 August 2021 | 30 September 2021 | |
| Group stage | Matchday 3 | 27 August 2021 | 21 October 2021 | |
| Group stage | Matchday 4 | 27 August 2021 | 4 November 2021 | |
| Group stage | Matchday 5 | 27 August 2021 | 25 November 2021 | |
| Group stage | Matchday 6 | 27 August 2021 | 9 December 2021 | |
| Knockout phase | Knockout round play-offs | 13 December 2021 | 17 February 2022 | 24 February 2022 |
| Knockout phase | Round of 16 | 25 February 2022 | 10 March 2022 | 17 March 2022 |
| Knockout phase | Quarter-finals | 18 March 2022 | 7 April 2022 | 14 April 2022 |
| Knockout phase | Semi-finals | 18 March 2022 | 28 April 2022 | 5 May 2022 |
| Knockout phase | Final | 18 March 2022 | 18 May 2022 at Estadio Ramón Sánchez Pizjuán, Seville | |

== Third qualifying round ==
The draw for the third qualifying round was held on 19 July 2021, 13:00 CEST. The first legs were played on 3 and 5 August, and the second legs were played on 10 and 12 August 2021.

The winners of the ties advanced to the play-off round. The losers were transferred to the Europa Conference League play-off round of their respective path.

| Team 1 | Agg. | Team 2 | 1st leg | 2nd leg |
|---|---|---|---|---|
Champions Path
| Omonia (Cyprus) | 2–2 (5–4 p) | (Estonia) Flora | 1–0 | 1–2 (a.e.t.) |
| Mura (Slovenia) | 1–0 | (Lithuania) Žalgiris | 0–0 | 1–0 |
| Kairat (Kazakhstan) | 2–3 | (Armenia) Alashkert | 0–0 | 2–3 (a.e.t.) |
| Lincoln Red Imps (Gibraltar) | 2–4 | (Slovakia) Slovan Bratislava | 1–3 | 1–1 |
| Neftçi (Azerbaijan) | 2–5 | (Finland) HJK | 2–2 | 0–3 |
Main Path
| Jablonec (Czech Republic) | 2–7 | (Scotland) Celtic | 2–4 | 0–3 |
| Rapid Wien (Austria) | 4–2 | (Cyprus) Anorthosis Famagusta | 3–0 | 1–2 |
| Galatasaray (Turkey) | 5–3 | (Scotland) St Johnstone | 1–1 | 4–2 |

== Play-off round ==
The draw for the play-off round was held on 2 August 2021, 13:00 CEST. The first legs were played on 17, 18 and 19 August, and the second legs were played on 26 August 2021.

The winners of the ties advanced to the group stage. The losers were transferred to the Europa Conference League group stage.

| Team 1 | Agg. | Team 2 | 1st leg | 2nd leg |
|---|---|---|---|---|
| Randers (Denmark) | 2–3 | (Turkey) Galatasaray | 1–1 | 1–2 |
| Rapid Wien (Austria) | 6–2 | (Ukraine) Zorya Luhansk | 3–0 | 3–2 |
| Celtic (Scotland) | 3–2 | (Netherlands) AZ | 2–0 | 1–2 |
| Fenerbahçe (Turkey) | 6–2 | (Finland) HJK | 1–0 | 5–2 |
| Mura (Slovenia) | 1–5 | (Austria) Sturm Graz | 1–3 | 0–2 |
| Omonia (Cyprus) | 4–4 (2–3 p) | (Belgium) Antwerp | 4–2 | 0–2 (a.e.t.) |
| Olympiacos (Greece) | 5–2 | (Slovakia) Slovan Bratislava | 3–0 | 2–2 |
| Rangers (Scotland) | 1–0 | (Armenia) Alashkert | 1–0 | 0–0 |
| Slavia Prague (Czech Republic) | 3–4 | (Poland) Legia Warsaw | 2–2 | 1–2 |
| Red Star Belgrade (Serbia) | 6–1 | (Romania) CFR Cluj | 4–0 | 2–1 |

== Group stage ==
Location of teams of the 2021–22 UEFA Europa League group stage.
Brown: Group A; Red: Group B; Orange: Group C; Yellow: Group D;
Green: Group E; Blue: Group F; Purple: Group G; Pink: Group H.

The draw for the group stage was held on 27 August 2021, 12:00 CEST (13:00 TRT), in Istanbul, Turkey. The 32 teams were drawn into eight groups of four. For the draw, the teams were seeded into four pots, each of eight teams, based on their 2021 UEFA club coefficients. Teams from the same association could not be drawn into the same group. Prior to the draw, UEFA formed pairings of teams from the same association, including those playing in the Europa Conference League group stage (one pairing for associations with two or three teams, two pairings for associations with four or five teams), based on television audiences, where one team was drawn into Groups A–D and another team was drawn into Groups E–H, so that the two teams would have different kick-off times.

The matches were played on 15–16 September, 30 September, 19–21 October, 4 November, 24–25 November, and 9 December 2021. The winners of each group advanced to the round of 16, while the runners-up advanced to the knockout round play-offs. The third-placed teams were transferred to the Europa Conference League knockout round play-offs, while the fourth-placed teams were eliminated from European competitions for the season.

Brøndby and West Ham United made their debut appearances in the Europa League group stage (although Brøndby had previously appeared in the UEFA Cup group stage).

=== Group A ===
| Pos | Team | Pld | W | D | L | GF | GA | GD | Pts | Qualification | LYO | RAN | SPP | BRO |
|---|---|---|---|---|---|---|---|---|---|---|---|---|---|---|
| 1 | (France) Lyon | 6 | 5 | 1 | 0 | 16 | 5 | +11 | 16 | Advance to round of 16 | — | 1–1 | 3–0 | 3–0 |
| 2 | (Scotland) Rangers | 6 | 2 | 2 | 2 | 6 | 5 | +1 | 8 | Advance to knockout round play-offs | 0–2 | — | 2–0 | 2–0 |
| 3 | (Czech Republic) Sparta Prague | 6 | 2 | 1 | 3 | 6 | 9 | −3 | 7 | Transfer to Europa Conference League | 3–4 | 1–0 | — | 2–0 |
| 4 | (Denmark) Brøndby | 6 | 0 | 2 | 4 | 2 | 11 | −9 | 2 | | 1–3 | 1–1 | 0–0 | — |

Source: UEFA

=== Group B ===
| Pos | Team | Pld | W | D | L | GF | GA | GD | Pts | Qualification | MON | RSO | PSV | STU |
|---|---|---|---|---|---|---|---|---|---|---|---|---|---|---|
| 1 | (France) Monaco | 6 | 3 | 3 | 0 | 7 | 4 | +3 | 12 | Advance to round of 16 | — | 2–1 | 0–0 | 1–0 |
| 2 | (Spain) Real Sociedad | 6 | 2 | 3 | 1 | 9 | 6 | +3 | 9 | Advance to knockout round play-offs | 1–1 | — | 3–0 | 1–1 |
| 3 | (Netherlands) PSV Eindhoven | 6 | 2 | 2 | 2 | 9 | 8 | +1 | 8 | Transfer to Europa Conference League | 1–2 | 2–2 | — | 2–0 |
| 4 | (Austria) Sturm Graz | 6 | 0 | 2 | 4 | 3 | 10 | −7 | 2 | | 1–1 | 0–1 | 1–4 | — |

Source: UEFA

=== Group C ===
| Pos | Team | Pld | W | D | L | GF | GA | GD | Pts | Qualification | SPM | NAP | LEI | LEG |
|---|---|---|---|---|---|---|---|---|---|---|---|---|---|---|
| 1 | (Russia) Spartak Moscow | 6 | 3 | 1 | 2 | 10 | 9 | +1 | 10 (Note: Head–to–head points: Spartak Moscow 6, Napoli 0.) | Advance to round of 16 | — | 2–1 | 3–4 | 0–1 |
| 2 | (Italy) Napoli | 6 | 3 | 1 | 2 | 15 | 10 | +5 | 10 | Advance to knockout round play-offs | 2–3 | — | 3–2 | 3–0 |
| 3 | (England) Leicester City | 6 | 2 | 2 | 2 | 12 | 11 | +1 | 8 | Transfer to Europa Conference League | 1–1 | 2–2 | — | 3–1 |
| 4 | (Poland) Legia Warsaw | 6 | 2 | 0 | 4 | 4 | 11 | −7 | 6 | | 0–1 | 1–4 | 1–0 | — |

Source: UEFA

=== Group D ===
| Pos | Team | Pld | W | D | L | GF | GA | GD | Pts | Qualification | FRA | OLY | FEN | ANT |
|---|---|---|---|---|---|---|---|---|---|---|---|---|---|---|
| 1 | (Germany) Eintracht Frankfurt | 6 | 3 | 3 | 0 | 10 | 6 | +4 | 12 | Advance to round of 16 | — | 3–1 | 1–1 | 2–2 |
| 2 | (Greece) Olympiacos | 6 | 3 | 0 | 3 | 8 | 7 | +1 | 9 | Advance to knockout round play-offs | 1–2 | — | 1–0 | 2–1 |
| 3 | (Turkey) Fenerbahçe | 6 | 1 | 3 | 2 | 7 | 8 | −1 | 6 | Transfer to Europa Conference League | 1–1 | 0–3 | — | 2–2 |
| 4 | (Belgium) Antwerp | 6 | 1 | 2 | 3 | 6 | 10 | −4 | 5 | | 0–1 | 1–0 | 0–3 | — |

Source: UEFA

=== Group E ===
| Pos | Team | Pld | W | D | L | GF | GA | GD | Pts | Qualification | GAL | LAZ | MAR | LOK |
|---|---|---|---|---|---|---|---|---|---|---|---|---|---|---|
| 1 | (Turkey) Galatasaray | 6 | 3 | 3 | 0 | 7 | 3 | +4 | 12 | Advance to round of 16 | — | 1–0 | 4–2 | 1–1 |
| 2 | (Italy) Lazio | 6 | 2 | 3 | 1 | 7 | 3 | +4 | 9 | Advance to knockout round play-offs | 0–0 | — | 0–0 | 2–0 |
| 3 | (France) Marseille | 6 | 1 | 4 | 1 | 6 | 7 | −1 | 7 | Transfer to Europa Conference League | 0–0 | 2–2 | — | 1–0 |
| 4 | (Russia) Lokomotiv Moscow | 6 | 0 | 2 | 4 | 2 | 9 | −7 | 2 | | 0–1 | 0–3 | 1–1 | — |

Source: UEFA

=== Group F ===
| Pos | Team | Pld | W | D | L | GF | GA | GD | Pts | Qualification | RSB | BRA | MID | LUD |
|---|---|---|---|---|---|---|---|---|---|---|---|---|---|---|
| 1 | (Serbia) Red Star Belgrade | 6 | 3 | 2 | 1 | 6 | 4 | +2 | 11 | Advance to round of 16 | — | 2–1 | 0–1 | 1–0 |
| 2 | (Portugal) Braga | 6 | 3 | 1 | 2 | 12 | 9 | +3 | 10 | Advance to knockout round play-offs | 1–1 | — | 3–1 | 4–2 |
| 3 | (Denmark) Midtjylland | 6 | 2 | 3 | 1 | 7 | 7 | 0 | 9 | Transfer to Europa Conference League | 1–1 | 3–2 | — | 1–1 |
| 4 | (Bulgaria) Ludogorets Razgrad | 6 | 0 | 2 | 4 | 3 | 8 | −5 | 2 | | 0–1 | 0–1 | 0–0 | — |

Source: UEFA

=== Group G ===
| Pos | Team | Pld | W | D | L | GF | GA | GD | Pts | Qualification | LEV | BET | CEL | FER |
|---|---|---|---|---|---|---|---|---|---|---|---|---|---|---|
| 1 | (Germany) Bayer Leverkusen | 6 | 4 | 1 | 1 | 14 | 5 | +9 | 13 | Advance to round of 16 | — | 4–0 | 3–2 | 2–1 |
| 2 | (Spain) Real Betis | 6 | 3 | 1 | 2 | 12 | 12 | 0 | 10 | Advance to knockout round play-offs | 1–1 | — | 4–3 | 2–0 |
| 3 | (Scotland) Celtic | 6 | 3 | 0 | 3 | 13 | 15 | −2 | 9 | Transfer to Europa Conference League | 0–4 | 3–2 | — | 2–0 |
| 4 | (Hungary) Ferencváros | 6 | 1 | 0 | 5 | 5 | 12 | −7 | 3 | | 1–0 | 1–3 | 2–3 | — |

Source: UEFA

=== Group H ===
| Pos | Team | Pld | W | D | L | GF | GA | GD | Pts | Qualification | WHU | DZA | RWI | GNK |
|---|---|---|---|---|---|---|---|---|---|---|---|---|---|---|
| 1 | (England) West Ham United | 6 | 4 | 1 | 1 | 11 | 3 | +8 | 13 | Advance to round of 16 | — | 0–1 | 2–0 | 3–0 |
| 2 | (Croatia) Dinamo Zagreb | 6 | 3 | 1 | 2 | 9 | 6 | +3 | 10 | Advance to knockout round play-offs | 0–2 | — | 3–1 | 1–1 |
| 3 | (Austria) Rapid Wien | 6 | 2 | 0 | 4 | 4 | 9 | −5 | 6 | Transfer to Europa Conference League | 0–2 | 2–1 | — | 0–1 |
| 4 | (Belgium) Genk | 6 | 1 | 2 | 3 | 4 | 10 | −6 | 5 | | 2–2 | 0–3 | 0–1 | — |

Source: UEFA

== Knockout phase ==
In the knockout phase, teams played against each other over two legs on a home-and-away basis, except for the one-match final. The mechanism of the draws for each round was as follows:

- In the draw for the knockout round play-offs, the eight group runners-up were seeded, and the eight Champions League group third-placed teams were unseeded. The seeded teams were drawn against the unseeded teams, with the seeded teams hosting the second leg. Teams from the same association could not be drawn against each other.
- In the draw for the round of 16, the eight group winners were seeded, and the eight winners of the knockout round play-offs were unseeded. Again, the seeded teams were drawn against the unseeded teams, with the seeded teams hosting the second leg. Once again, teams from the same association could not be drawn against each other.
- In the draws for the quarter-finals onwards, there were no seedings, and teams from the same association could be drawn against each other. As the draws for the quarter-finals and semi-finals were held together before the quarter-finals were played, the identity of the quarter-final winners was not known at the time of the semi-final draw. A draw was also held to determine which semi-final winner was designated as the "home" team for the final (for administrative purposes as it was played at a neutral venue).

=== Bracket ===
Knockout round play-offs
(Spain) Sevilla | 3 | 0 | 3
(Croatia) Dinamo Zagreb | 1 | 1 | 2
(Portugal) Porto | 2 | 2 | 4
(Italy) Lazio | 1 | 2 | 3
(Russia) Zenit Saint Petersburg | 2 | 0 | 2
(Spain) Real Betis | 3 | 0 | 3
(Spain) Barcelona | 1 | 4 | 5
(Italy) Napoli | 1 | 2 | 3
(Germany) RB Leipzig | 2 | 3 | 5
(Spain) Real Sociedad | 2 | 1 | 3
(Italy) Atalanta | 2 | 3 | 5
(Greece) Olympiacos | 1 | 0 | 1
(Moldova) Sheriff Tiraspol | 2 | 0 | 2 (2)
(Portugal) Braga (p) | 0 | 2 | 2 (3)
(Germany) Borussia Dortmund | 2 | 2 | 4
(Scotland) Rangers | 4 | 2 | 6

Round of 16
(Spain) Sevilla | 1 | 0 | 1
(England) West Ham United (a.e.t.) | 0 | 2 | 2
(Portugal) Porto | 0 | 1 | 1
(France) Lyon | 1 | 1 | 2
(Spain) Real Betis | 1 | 1 | 2
(Germany) Eintracht Frankfurt (a.e.t.) | 2 | 1 | 3
(Spain) Barcelona | 0 | 2 | 2
(Turkey) Galatasaray | 0 | 1 | 1
(Germany) RB Leipzig (w/o) | — | — | —
(Russia) Spartak Moscow | — | — | —
(Italy) Atalanta | 3 | 1 | 4
(Germany) Bayer Leverkusen | 2 | 0 | 2
(Portugal) Braga | 2 | 1 | 3
(France) Monaco | 0 | 1 | 1
(Scotland) Rangers | 3 | 1 | 4
(Serbia) Red Star Belgrade | 0 | 2 | 2

Quarter-finals
(England) West Ham United | 1 | 3 | 4
(France) Lyon | 1 | 0 | 1
(Germany) Eintracht Frankfurt | 1 | 3 | 4
(Spain) Barcelona | 1 | 2 | 3
(Germany) RB Leipzig | 1 | 2 | 3
(Italy) Atalanta | 1 | 0 | 1
(Portugal) Braga | 1 | 1 | 2
(Scotland) Rangers (a.e.t.) | 0 | 3 | 3

Semi-finals
(England) West Ham United | 1 | 0 | 1
(Germany) Eintracht Frankfurt | 2 | 1 | 3
(Germany) RB Leipzig | 1 | 1 | 2
(Scotland) Rangers | 0 | 3 | 3

Final
18 May – Seville
(Germany) Eintracht Frankfurt (p) | 1 (5)
(Scotland) Rangers | 1 (4)

=== Knockout round play-offs ===
The draw for the knockout round play-offs was held on 13 December 2021, 13:00 CET. The first legs were played on 17 February, and the second legs were played on 24 February 2022.

| Team 1 | Agg. | Team 2 | 1st leg | 2nd leg |
|---|---|---|---|---|
| Sevilla (Spain) | 3–2 | (Croatia) Dinamo Zagreb | 3–1 | 0–1 |
| Atalanta (Italy) | 5–1 | (Greece) Olympiacos | 2–1 | 3–0 |
| RB Leipzig (Germany) | 5–3 | (Spain) Real Sociedad | 2–2 | 3–1 |
| Barcelona (Spain) | 5–3 | (Italy) Napoli | 1–1 | 4–2 |
| Zenit Saint Petersburg (Russia) | 2–3 | (Spain) Real Betis | 2–3 | 0–0 |
| Borussia Dortmund (Germany) | 4–6 | (Scotland) Rangers | 2–4 | 2–2 |
| Sheriff Tiraspol (Moldova) | 2–2 (2–3 p) | (Portugal) Braga | 2–0 | 0–2 (a.e.t.) |
| Porto (Portugal) | 4–3 | (Italy) Lazio | 2–1 | 2–2 |

=== Round of 16 ===
The draw for the round of 16 was held on 25 February 2022, 12:00 CET. The first legs were played on 9 and 10 March, and the second legs were played on 17 March 2022.

| Team 1 | Agg. | Team 2 | 1st leg | 2nd leg |
|---|---|---|---|---|
| Rangers (Scotland) | 4–2 | (Serbia) Red Star Belgrade | 3–0 | 1–2 |
| Braga (Portugal) | 3–1 | (France) Monaco | 2–0 | 1–1 |
| Porto (Portugal) | 1–2 | (France) Lyon | 0–1 | 1–1 |
| Atalanta (Italy) | 4–2 | (Germany) Bayer Leverkusen | 3–2 | 1–0 |
| Sevilla (Spain) | 1–2 | (England) West Ham United | 1–0 | 0–2 (a.e.t.) |
| Barcelona (Spain) | 2–1 | (Turkey) Galatasaray | 0–0 | 2–1 |
| RB Leipzig (Germany) | w/o (Note: RB Leipzig won on walkover as UEFA suspended Spartak Moscow due to the Russian invasion of Ukraine.) | (Russia) Spartak Moscow | Canc. | Canc. |
| Real Betis (Spain) | 2–3 | (Germany) Eintracht Frankfurt | 1–2 | 1–1 (a.e.t.) |

=== Quarter-finals ===
The draw for the quarter-finals was held on 18 March 2022, 13:30 CET. The first legs were played on 7 April, and the second legs were played on 14 April 2022.

| Team 1 | Agg. | Team 2 | 1st leg | 2nd leg |
|---|---|---|---|---|
| RB Leipzig (Germany) | 3–1 | (Italy) Atalanta | 1–1 | 2–0 |
| Eintracht Frankfurt (Germany) | 4–3 | (Spain) Barcelona | 1–1 | 3–2 |
| West Ham United (England) | 4–1 | (France) Lyon | 1–1 | 3–0 |
| Braga (Portugal) | 2–3 | (Scotland) Rangers | 1–0 | 1–3 (a.e.t.) |

=== Semi-finals ===
The draw for the semi-finals was held on 18 March 2022, 13:30 CET, after the quarter-final draw. The first legs were played on 28 April, and the second legs were played on 5 May 2022.

| Team 1 | Agg. | Team 2 | 1st leg | 2nd leg |
|---|---|---|---|---|
| RB Leipzig (Germany) | 2–3 | (Scotland) Rangers | 1–0 | 1–3 |
| West Ham United (England) | 1–3 | (Germany) Eintracht Frankfurt | 1–2 | 0–1 |

=== Final ===
The final was played on 18 May 2022 at the Estadio Ramón Sánchez Pizjuán in Seville. A draw was held on 18 March 2022, after the quarter-final and semi-final draws, to determine the "home" team for administrative purposes.

18 May 2022
21:00 UTC+2

| Eintracht Frankfurt (Germany) | 1–1 (a.e.t.) | (Scotland) Rangers |
|---|---|---|
| Borré 69' | Report | Aribo 57' |
Penalties
| Lenz (penalty scored); Hrustic (penalty scored); Kamada (penalty scored); Kostić (penalty scored); Borré (penalty scored) | 5–4 | (penalty scored) Tavernier; (penalty scored) Davis; (penalty scored) Arfield; (penalty missed) Ramsey; (penalty scored) Roofe |

Estadio Ramón Sánchez Pizjuán, Seville
Attendance: 38,842
Referee: Slavko Vinčić (Slovenia)

== Statistics ==
Statistics exclude qualifying round and play-off round.

=== Top goalscorers ===
| Rank | Player | Team(s) | Goals | Minutes played |
|---|---|---|---|---|
| 1 | (England) James Tavernier | (Scotland) Rangers | 7 | 1320 |
| 2 | (Cameroon) Karl Toko Ekambi | (France) Lyon | 6 | 583 |
| 2 | (Brazil) Galeno (Note: Galeno played for Braga in the group stage and for Porto in the knockout stage, after his transfer during the January transfer window.) | (Portugal) Braga (Portugal) Porto | 6 | 657 |
| 4 | (Zambia) Patson Daka | (England) Leicester City | 5 | 416 |
| 4 | (Japan) Daichi Kamada | (Germany) Eintracht Frankfurt | 5 | 1108 |
| 6 | (Russia) Aleksandr Sobolev | (Russia) Spartak Moscow | 4 | 311 |
| 6 | (Nigeria) Victor Osimhen | (Italy) Napoli | 4 | 321 |
| 6 | (Poland) Arkadiusz Milik | (France) Marseille | 4 | 351 |
| 6 | (Italy) Ciro Immobile | (Italy) Lazio | 4 | 524 |
| 6 | (France) Christopher Nkunku | (Germany) RB Leipzig | 4 | 526 |
| 6 | (Spain) Borja Iglesias | (Spain) Real Betis | 4 | 556 |
| 6 | (North Macedonia) Eljif Elmas | (Italy) Napoli | 4 | 617 |
| 6 | (France) Moussa Diaby | (Germany) Bayer Leverkusen | 4 | 623 |
| 6 | (Croatia) Mislav Oršić | (Croatia) Dinamo Zagreb | 4 | 672 |
| 6 | (Colombia) Alfredo Morelos | (Scotland) Rangers | 4 | 680 |
| 6 | (Colombia) Rafael Santos Borré | (Germany) Eintracht Frankfurt | 4 | 1093 |
| 6 | (Portugal) Ricardo Horta | (Portugal) Braga | 4 | 1119 |

=== Top assists ===
| Rank | Player | Team | Assists | Minutes played |
|---|---|---|---|---|
| 1 | (Serbia) Filip Kostić | (Germany) Eintracht Frankfurt | 6 | 1140 |
| 2 | (Germany) Florian Wirtz | (Germany) Bayer Leverkusen | 4 | 437 |
| 2 | (Portugal) Iuri Medeiros | (Portugal) Braga | 4 | 674 |
| 2 | (Portugal) Ricardo Horta | (Portugal) Braga | 4 | 1119 |
| 5 | (Nigeria) Kelechi Iheanacho | (England) Leicester City | 3 | 273 |
| 5 | (Russia) Aleksandr Golovin | (France) Monaco | 3 | 331 |
| 5 | (Italy) Andrea Petagna | (Italy) Napoli | 3 | 340 |
| 5 | (Germany) Mario Götze | (Netherlands) PSV Eindhoven | 3 | 421 |
| 5 | (Spain) Angeliño | (Germany) RB Leipzig | 3 | 467 |
| 5 | (Spain) Sergio Canales | (Spain) Real Betis | 3 | 495 |
| 5 | (Nigeria) Victor Moses | (Russia) Spartak Moscow | 3 | 525 |
| 5 | (France) Nabil Fekir | (Spain) Real Betis | 3 | 596 |
| 5 | (France) Moussa Diaby | (Germany) Bayer Leverkusen | 3 | 623 |
| 5 | (Spain) Pablo Fornals | (England) West Ham United | 3 | 714 |
| 5 | (Nigeria) Joe Aribo | (Scotland) Rangers | 3 | 1111 |
| 5 | (England) Ryan Kent | (Scotland) Rangers | 3 | 1143 |

=== Team of the season ===
The UEFA technical study group selected the following players as the team of the tournament.

| Pos. | Player | Team |
|---|---|---|
| GK | (Germany) Kevin Trapp | (Germany) Eintracht Frankfurt |
| DF | (England) Craig Dawson | (England) West Ham United |
| DF | (Austria) Martin Hinteregger | (Germany) Eintracht Frankfurt |
| DF | (Nigeria) Calvin Bassey | (Scotland) Rangers |
| MF | (England) James Tavernier | (Scotland) Rangers |
| MF | (Austria) Konrad Laimer | (Germany) RB Leipzig |
| MF | (England) Declan Rice | (England) West Ham United |
| MF | (Serbia) Filip Kostić | (Germany) Eintracht Frankfurt |
| FW | (France) Christopher Nkunku | (Germany) RB Leipzig |
| FW | (Colombia) Rafael Santos Borré | (Germany) Eintracht Frankfurt |
| FW | (England) Ryan Kent | (Scotland) Rangers |

=== Player of the Season ===
- (Serbia) Filip Kostić ( (Germany) Eintracht Frankfurt)

=== Young Player of the Season ===
- (Germany) Ansgar Knauff ( (Germany) Eintracht Frankfurt)

== See also ==
- 2021–22 UEFA Champions League
- 2021–22 UEFA Europa Conference League
- 2022 UEFA Super Cup
- 2021–22 UEFA Women's Champions League
- 2021–22 UEFA Youth League
