= Mário Branco =

Portuguese football manager

Personal information
- Full name: Mário Jorge dos Santos Branco
- Date of birth: 6 November 1975 (age 50)
- Place of birth: Porto, Portugal

Team information
- Current team: Benfica

Managerial career
- Years: Team
- 2004–2005: Pontevedra (scout)
- 2005–2006: Wisła Kraków (scout)
- 2006–2007: Zagłębie Lubin (scout)
- 2008–2009: Steaua București (scout)
- 2009–2011: Leixões (sporting director)
- 2011–2012: Astra Ploiesti (sporting director)
- 2012–2016: Estoril (sporting director)
- 2016–2018: Hajduk Split (sporting director)
- 2018–2020: PAOK (sporting director)
- 2020–2021: Famalicão (sporting director)
- 2022–2025: Fenerbahçe (sporting director)
- 2025–: Benfica (sporting director)

Mário Jorge dos Santos Branco (born 6 November 1975) is a Portuguese former football scout and a current director of football for Benfica. He has previously worked with the clubs Pontevedra in Spain, Leixões, Estoril and Famalicão in Portugal, Wisła Kraków and Zagłębie Lubin in Poland, Steaua București and Astra Ploiesti in Romania, Hajduk Split in Croatia and PAOK in Greece, Fenerbahçe in Turkey. He's also a Portuguese FA lecturer.

== Career ==
=== Chief scout career (2004–2009) ===
Mario Branco started his non-staff career as a chief scout position and worked for Pontevedra in Spain, for Wisła Kraków and Zagłębie Lubin in Poland and also for Steaua București in Romania.

=== Leixões (2009–2011) ===
On 1 July 2011 started his career with the club as sporting director and he was in office until 30 June 2011.

=== Astra Ploiesti (2011–2012) ===
It was announced that Comolli would return to Romania and been sporting director of the Romanian side Astra Ploiesti between 1 July 2011 and 30 June 2012.

=== Estoril (2012–2016) ===
On 1 July 2012, he joined Estoril and spent four seasons as a sporting director with overall responsibility for the medical, academy, scouting and club secretarial departments. The team qualified to Europa League group stage in two consecutive seasons, immediately after promoting from 2nd League.

He scouted Diego Carlos in Brazil and played an important role in his transfer to Estoril.

=== Hajduk Split (2016–2018) ===
On 1 July 2016, he appointed as sporting director at Hajduk Split. He played a leading role in the transfers of Nikola Vlašić to Everton (€10,80 million) which is the Hajduk Split record transfer and Ante Palaversa to Manchester City (€7 million) instantly returning to Hajduk on loan.

=== PAOK (2018–2020) ===
On 1 July 2018, he started his career in Greece as sporting director. Aleksandar Prijovic's Al-Ittihad transfer (€10 million) is his best office performance for the club. In the season 2018/19 PAOK won the Golden Double - in the same season won Greek SuperLeague Champion for the first time in 34 years being unbeaten, and has won Greek Cup.

=== Famalicão (2020–2021) ===
On 15 December 2020, he started to work as sporting director of the club and was the key person in sealing the transfer of Manuel Ugarte from CA Fénix (€9,10 million) who transferred to Sporting CP six months later (€24,50 million).

=== Fenerbahçe (2022–2025) ===
On 14 June 2022, Mário Branco started his Fenerbahçe career as director of football. He made an instant impact at Fenerbahçe as he was responsible for the signings of Diego Rossi, Joshua King, João Pedro, Michy Batshuayi and Jayden Oosterwolde for 2022–23 season.

On 1 July 2023, he appointment as sporting director with the club. Since then, he also signed with Edin Džeko, Dušan Tadić, Dominik Livaković, Alexander Djiku, Sebastian Szymański, Rodrigo Becão, Fred, Leonardo Bonucci, Cengiz Ünder and Çağlar Söyüncü for 2023–24 season and Portuguese professional football manager José Mourinho, footballers Cenk Tosun, Allan Saint-Maximin, Filip Kostić, Youssef En-Nesyri and Sofyan Amrabat for 2024–25.

Mário Branco also played a leading role in the transfers of Kim Min-jae to Napoli (€18,05 million), Arda Güler to Real Madrid (€20 million), Attila Szalai to Hoffenheim (€12.3 million) and Ferdi Kadıoğlu to Brighton & Hove Albion (£25million with an additional £4,20 million in add-ons)

In 2024–25 season winter transfer window, he is acting main role for Diego Carlos permanent transfer from Aston Villa, Milan Škriniar loan transfer from Paris Saint-Germain and Talisca permanent transfer from Al Nassr.

On 2 June 2025, he parted ways with Fenerbahçe.

=== Benfica (2025–present) ===
On 8 July 2025, he appointed new sporting director of Benfica.

He made an immediate impact for 2025–26 season and transferred Richard Ríos from Palmeiras, Franjo Ivanović from Union SG, Dodi Lukébakio from Sevilla and transfers of Álvaro Carreras to Real Madrid for €50 million, Kerem Aktürkoğlu to Fenerbahçe for €22.5 million, and Orkun Kökçü to Beşiktaş for €30 million.
