= 2022–23 Fenerbahçe S.K. season =

Fenerbahçe
2022–23 season
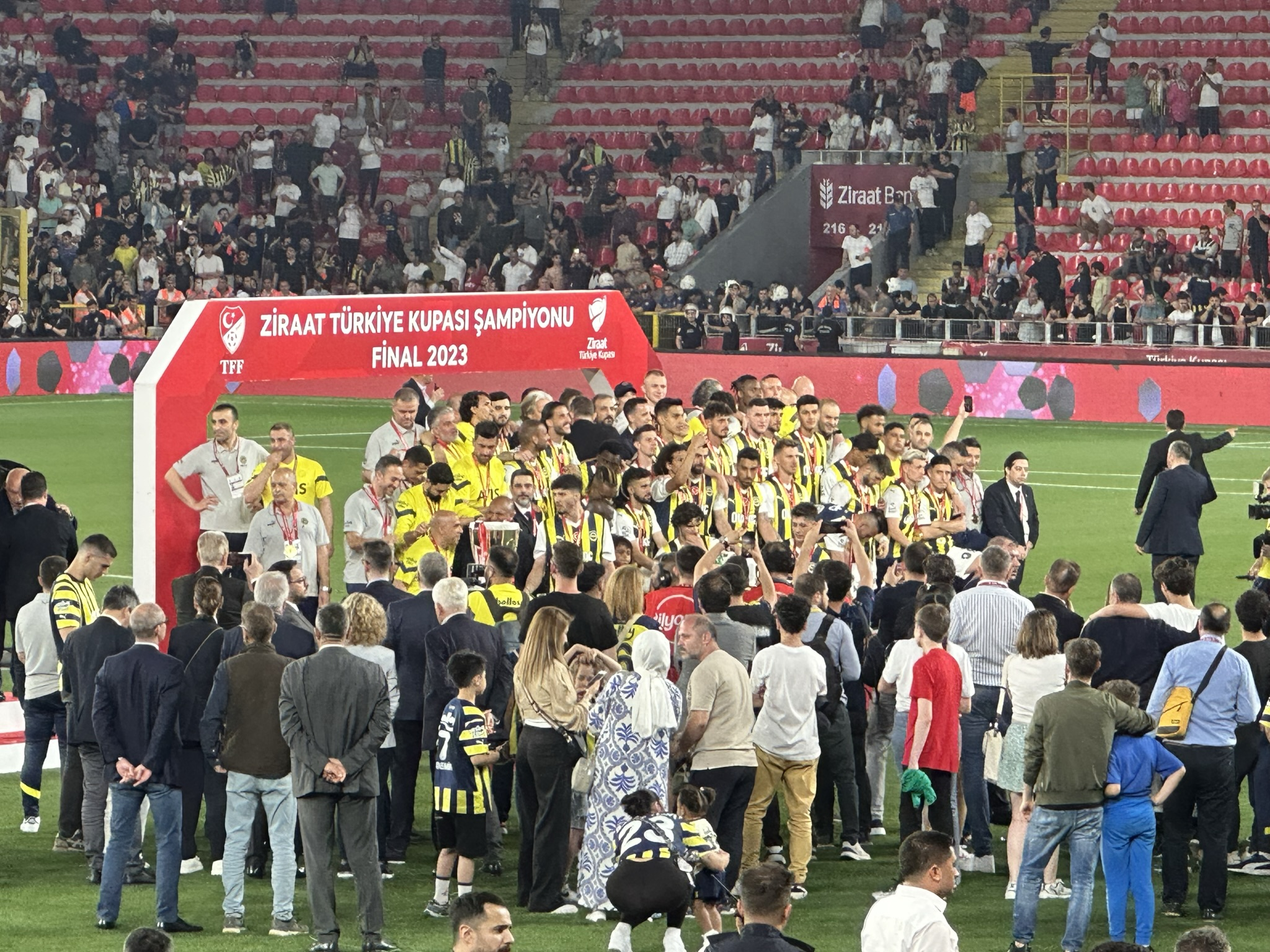
- Fenerbahçe players and staff celebrating their Turkish Cup victory
- President: Ali Koç
- Head coach: Jorge Jesus
- Stadium: Şükrü Saracoğlu Stadium
- Süper Lig: 2nd
- Turkish Cup: Winners
- UEFA Champions League: Second qualifying round
- UEFA Europa League: Round of 16
- Top goalscorer: League: Enner Valencia (29); All: Enner Valencia (33)
- Highest home attendance: 45,798 (vs. Galatasaray, 8 January 2023, Süper Lig)
- Lowest home attendance: 29,564 (vs. Antalyaspor, 30 May 2023, Süper Lig)
- Average home league attendance: 38,321
- Biggest win: 6–0 (vs. Kasımpaşa (A), 15 August 2022, Süper Lig)
- Biggest defeat: 0–3 (vs. Galatasaray (H), 8 January 2023, Süper Lig vs. Galatasaray (A), 4 June 2023, Süper Lig)
Home colours	Away colours	Third colours

The 2022–23 season was the 116th season in the existence of Fenerbahçe S.K. and the club's 65th consecutive season in the top flight of Turkish football. In addition to the domestic league, Fenerbahçe participated in this season's edition of the Turkish Cup, UEFA Champions League and the UEFA Europa League.

== Club ==
=== Board of directors ===
Position	Staff
Chairman	(Turkey) Ali Koç
Deputy Chairman	(Turkey) Erol Bilecik
General Secretary	(Turkey) Burak Çağlan Kızılhan
Board Member	(Turkey) Mehmet Dereli
Board Member	(Turkey) Fethi Pekin
Board Member	(Turkey) Acar Sertaç Komsuoğlu
Board Member	(Turkey) Simla Türker Bayazıt
Board Member	(Turkey) Hüseyin Arslan
Board Member	(Turkey) Esin Güral Argat
Board Member	(Turkey) Ahmet Ketenci
Board Member	(Turkey) Mustafa Kemal Danabaş
Board Member	(Turkey) Agah Ruşen Çetin
Board Member	(Turkey) Selma Altay Rodopman
Board Member	(Turkey) Ömer Okan
Board Member	(Turkey) Selahattin Baki

Last updated: 6 March 2023
Source: Fenerbahce.org

=== Staff ===
Position	Staff
Administrative Manager	(Turkey) Emir Yolaç
Head Coach	(Portugal) Jorge Jesus
Operations Director	(Portugal) Mário Branco
Technical Manager	(Turkey) Mehmet Aurélio
Assistant Coach	(Portugal) João de Deus
Assistant Coach	(Portugal) Tiago Oliveira
Assistant Coach	(Turkey) Zeki Murat Göle
Athletic Performance Coach	(Portugal) Carlos Bruno
Athletic Performance Coach	(Portugal) Márcio Sampaio
Athletic Performance Coach	(Portugal) Pedro Gandaio
Athletic Performance Coach	(Turkey) Cihan Mert Cengiz
Match Analyst	(Portugal) Gil Henriques
Video Analyst	(Portugal) Rodrigo Araújo
Goalkeeping Coach	(Turkey) Özden Öngün
Goalkeeping Coach	(Turkey) Yasin Cirav
Analysis Specialist	(Turkey) Melikşah Sezgin
Analyst	(Turkey) Mehmet Turhan Demir
Doctor	(Turkey) Dr. Osman İlhan
Media Officer	(Turkey) Alper Yemeniciler
Interpreter	(Turkey) Sinan Levi
Interpreter	(Turkey) Saruhan Karaman
Physiotherapist	(Turkey) Umut Şahin
Physiotherapist	(Turkey) Bülent Uyar
Physiotherapist	(Turkey) Ata Özgür Ercan
Nutritionist	(Turkey) Şengül Sangu Talak
Masseur	(Turkey) Özkan Alaca
Masseur	(Turkey) Veysel Çabşek
Masseur	(Turkey) Muhammed Fatih Yeniay
Masseur	(Turkey) Eyüp Emre Yeşiller
Material Manager	(Turkey) Dursun Çetin
Material Manager	(Turkey) Cemil Bulut
Material Manager	(Turkey) Sefa Eroğlu

Last updated: 6 March 2023
Source: Fenerbahce.org

=== Facilities ===
2023–24 home kit, used in the game against İstanbul Başakşehir on Final of the Turkish Cup.

Position	Staff
Stadium	(Turkey) Şükrü Saracoğlu Stadium
Training facility	(Turkey) Lefter Küçükandonyadis Facilities
Training facility	(Turkey) Faruk Ilgaz Facilities
Training facility	(Turkey) Düzce Topuk Yaylası Facilities
Training facility	(Turkey) Can Bartu Facilities
Training facility	(Turkey) Fikirtepe Facilities

Last updated: 6 March 2023
Source: Fenerbahce.org

== Kits ==
Fenerbahçe's 2022–23 kits, manufactured by Puma, released on 19 July 2022 and were up for sale on the same day.

- Supplier: Puma
- Main sponsor: Avis
- Back sponsor: Halley
- Sleeve sponsor: Nesine.com
- Short sponsor: Aygaz, Pasha Group
- Socks sponsor: —

Home
Home alt.
Away
Away alt.
Third
Third alt.
Goalkeeper 1
Goalkeeper 2
Goalkeeper 3

=== Training ===
Players	Staff

== Players ==
=== First-team squad ===
No.	Pos.	Nat.	Name	Age	EU	Since	App	Goals	Ends	Transfer fee	Notes
1	GK	(Turkey)	Altay Bayındır (Captain)	25	Non-EU	2019	141	0	2027	€1.50M	
2	DF	(Brazil)	Gustavo Henrique	30	Non-EU	2022	23	3	2023	Loan	
3	DF	(Turkey)	Samet Akaydin	29	Non-EU	2023 (Winter)	23	0	2026	€3.70M	
4	DF	(Turkey)	Serdar Aziz	32	Non-EU	2019 (Winter)	115	10	2025	Free	
5	MF	(Brazil)	Willian Arão	31	Non-EU	2022	45	1	2026	€3.00M	
6	DF	(North Macedonia)	Ezgjan Alioski	31	Non-EU	2022	26	1	2023	Loan	
7	MF	(Turkey)	Ferdi Kadıoğlu	23	EU	2018	148	14	2026	€1.40M	Other nationalities: Dutch, Canadian
8	MF	(Turkey)	Mert Hakan Yandaş	28	Non-EU	2020	95	7	2024	Free	
9	FW	(Uruguay)	Diego Rossi	25	EU	2021	90	10	2025	€5.50M	Second nationality: Italian
10	MF	(Turkey)	Arda Güler	18	Non-EU	2021	51	9	2025	€2.50M	
13	FW	(Ecuador)	Enner Valencia (Vice-Captain)	33	Non-EU	2020	116	59	2023	Free	
15	FW	(Norway)	Joshua King	31	EU	2022	27	7	2024	Free	Second nationality: Gambian
17	MF	(Turkey)	İrfan Kahveci	27	Non-EU	2021 (Winter)	83	11	2025	€7.00M	
18	MF	(Brazil)	Lincoln	24	Non-EU	2022	35	2	2026	€3.50M	
19	FW	(Turkey)	Serdar Dursun	31	EU	2021	63	19	2024	Free	Second nationality: German
20	MF	(Italy)	João Pedro	31	EU	2022	28	5	2025	€4.68M	Second nationality: Brazilian
21	MF	(Nigeria)	Bright Osayi-Samuel	25	Non-EU	2021 (Winter)	100	3	2025	Undisclosed	Second nationality: English
23	FW	(Belgium)	Michy Batshuayi	29	EU	2022	32	20	2025	€3.50M	Second nationality: Congolese
24	DF	(Netherlands)	Jayden Oosterwolde	22	EU	2023 (Winter)	5	0	2027	€6.00M	Second nationality: Surinamese
26	MF	(Slovenia)	Miha Zajc	28	EU	2019 (Winter)	102	18	2023	€3.50M	
27	MF	(Portugal)	Miguel Crespo	27	EU	2021	62	4	2024	Undisclosed	Second nationality: French
28	DF	(Brazil)	Luan Peres	28	Non-EU	2022	20	1	2025	€5.23M	
30	DF	(Turkey)	Nazım Sangaré	29	EU	2020	50	2	2024	€1.75M	Other nationalities: German, Guinean
41	DF	(Hungary)	Attila Szalai	25	EU	2021 (Winter)	117	7	2025	€2.00M	
54	GK	(Turkey)	Ertuğrul Çetin	20	Non-EU	2021	3	0	2024	Youth system	
70	GK	(Turkey)	İrfan Can Eğribayat	24	Non-EU	2022	13	0	2023	Loan	
80	MF	(Turkey)	İsmail Yüksek	24	Non-EU	2020	33	1	2027	Free	
99	FW	(Turkey)	Emre Mor	25	EU	2022	41	6	2025	€2.00M	Second nationality: Danish

- Last updated: 11 June 2023
- Source: Fenerbahce.org
- Ordered by squad number.

== Transfers ==
=== In ===
No.	Pos.	Player	Transferred from	Fee	Date	Source
9	FW	(Uruguay) Diego Rossi	(United States) Los Angeles	€5.50M	3 May 2022	
18	MF	(Brazil) Lincoln	(Portugal) Santa Clara	€3.50M	14 June 2022	
22	FW	(Portugal) Bruma	(Netherlands) PSV	Free transfer	17 June 2022	
24	FW	(Tanzania) Mbwana Samatta	(Belgium) Royal Antwerp	Loan return	30 June 2022	—
—	FW	(Iran) Allahyar Sayyadmanesh	(England) Hull City	Loan return	30 June 2022	—
—	MF	(Turkey) Barış Sungur	(Turkey) Kuşadasıspor	Loan return	30 June 2022	—
23	MF	(Turkey) Muhammed Gümüşkaya	(Turkey) Giresunspor	Loan return	30 June 2022	—
6	MF	(Germany) Max Meyer	(Denmark) Midtjylland	Loan return	30 June 2022	—
44	DF	(Sierra Leone) Steven Caulker	(Turkey) Gaziantep	Loan return	30 June 2022	—
29	DF	(Uruguay) Mauricio Lemos	(Belgium) Beerschot	Loan return	30 June 2022	—
80	MF	(Turkey) İsmail Yüksek	(Turkey) Bursaspor	Loan return	30 June 2022	—
99	FW	(Turkey) Emre Mor	(Turkey) Fatih Karagümrük	€2.00M	1 July 2022	
58	FW	(Turkey) Tiago Cukur	(England) Watford	€0.25M	13 July 2022	
15	FW	(Norway) Joshua King	(England) Watford	Free transfer	13 July 2022	
5	MF	(Brazil) Willian Arão	(Brazil) Flamengo	€3.00M	14 July 2022	
20	MF	(Italy) João Pedro	(Italy) Cagliari	€4.68M	21 July 2022	
28	DF	(Brazil) Luan Peres	(France) Marseille	€5.23M	29 July 2022	
2	DF	(Brazil) Gustavo Henrique	(Brazil) Flamengo	Free transfer	30 July 2022	
6	DF	(North Macedonia) Ezgjan Alioski	(Saudi Arabia) Al-Ahli	Free transfer	2 August 2022	
70	GK	(Turkey) İrfan Can Eğribayat	(Turkey) Göztepe	Free transfer	3 August 2022	
23	FW	(Belgium) Michy Batshuayi	(England) Chelsea	€3.50M	2 September 2022	
3	DF	(Turkey) Samet Akaydin	(Turkey) Adana Demirspor	€3.70M	11 January 2023	
22	FW	(Portugal) Bruma	(Netherlands) PSV	€4.25M	29 January 2023	
24	DF	(Netherlands) Jayden Oosterwolde	(Italy) Parma	€6.00M	29 January 2023	
14	FW	(Turkey) Emre Demir	(Spain) Barcelona B	Free transfer	1 February 2023	

=== Out ===
No.	Pos.	Player	Transferred to	Fee	Date	Source
35	GK	(Turkey) Berke Özer	(Portugal) Portimonense	Free transfer	30 June 2022	—
5	MF	(Argentina) José Sosa	(Argentina) Estudiantes (LP)	Free transfer	30 June 2022	—
—	DF	(Turkey) Murat Sağlam	(Germany) SSG Halvestorf-Herkendorf	Free transfer	30 June 2022	—
7	MF	(Turkey) Ozan Tufan	(England) Hull City	€3.00M	1 July 2022	
—	FW	(Iran) Allahyar Sayyadmanesh	(England) Hull City	€4.50M	9 July 2022	
10	MF	(Germany) Mesut Özil	(Turkey) İstanbul Başakşehir	Contract termination	13 July 2022	
99	FW	(Albania) Arda Okan Kurtulan	(Turkey) Adana Demirspor	€0.20M	14 July 2022	
3	DF	(South Korea) Kim Min-jae	(Italy) Napoli	€18.05M	27 July 2022	
20	MF	(Brazil) Luiz Gustavo	(Saudi Arabia) Al Nassr	Free transfer	27 July 2022	
24	FW	(Tanzania) Mbwana Samatta	(Belgium) Genk	Free transfer	16 August 2022	
32	DF	(Democratic Republic of the Congo) Marcel Tisserand	(Saudi Arabia) Al-Ettifaq	€3.00M	21 August 2022	
23	MF	(Turkey) Muhammed Gümüşkaya	(Belgium) Westerlo	€0.50M	23 August 2022	
6	MF	(Germany) Max Meyer	(Switzerland) Luzern	Free transfer	24 August 2022	
44	DF	(Sierra Leone) Steven Caulker	(Turkey) Fatih Karagümrük	Free transfer	26 August 2022	
58	FW	(Turkey) Tiago Cukur	(Belgium) Dender EH	Loan	30 August 2022	
11	FW	(Germany) Mërgim Berisha	(Germany) FC Augsburg	Loan	31 August 2022	
14	MF	(Greece) Dimitrios Pelkas	(England) Hull City	Loan	2 September 2022	
77	FW	(Turkey) Burak Kapacak	(Turkey) Fatih Karagümrük	Loan	7 September 2022	
37	FW	(Czech Republic) Filip Novák	(United Arab Emirates) Al Jazira	Mutual agreement	28 September 2022	
33	DF	(Turkey) Çağtay Kurukalıp	(Turkey) Iğdır	Loan	12 January 2023	—
22	FW	(Portugal) Bruma	(Portugal) Braga	Loan	29 January 2023	
14	FW	(Turkey) Emre Demir	(Turkey) Samsunspor	Loan	3 February 2023	
29	DF	(Uruguay) Mauricio Lemos	(Brazil) Atlético Mineiro	Free transfer	16 February 2023	

Total spending: ▼€41.61M
Total income: ▲€29.25M
Expenditure: ▼€12.36M

=== Contract renewals ===
No.	Pos.	Nat.	Player	Age	Status	Contract length	Contract ends	Source
80	MF	(Turkey)	İsmail Yüksek	24	Extended	Four-and-a-half-year	30 June 2027	
22	FW	(Portugal)	Bruma	28	Buy-out	Two-and-a-half-year	30 June 2025	
1	GK	(Turkey)	Altay Bayındır	25	Extended	Four-year	30 June 2027	

== Pre-season and friendlies ==
Win Draw Loss Fixtures

=== Pre-season ===
22 June 2022 Friendly	Fenerbahçe (Turkey)	2–2	(North Macedonia) Shkupi	Istanbul, Turkey
18:00 TRT (UTC+3)	Lincoln 16'; Gümüşkaya 83'	Report	Adetunji 13', 47'	Stadium: Fenerbahçe Can Bartu Facilities; Referee: Burak Taşkınsoy

25 June 2022 Friendly	Fenerbahçe (Turkey)	4–0	(Albania) Tirana	Istanbul, Turkey
18:00 TRT (UTC+3)	Berisha 9'; Novák 53'; Pelkas 84'; Samatta 88'	Report		Stadium: Fenerbahçe Can Bartu Facilities; Referee: İlker Yasin Avcı

29 June 2022 Friendly	Fenerbahçe (Turkey)	4–2	(Qatar) Al-Shamal	Istanbul, Turkey
18:00 TRT (UTC+3)	Bruma 10'; Valencia 60'; Berisha 66'; Demir (yellow card) 83'; Dursun 88'	Report	Attwan 54'; El-Sayed 75'	Stadium: Fenerbahçe Can Bartu Facilities; Referee: Can Cengiz

2 July 2022 Friendly	Fenerbahçe (Turkey)	1–0	(Serbia) Partizan	Graz, Austria
18:30 CEST (UTC+2)	Valencia 2'; Yüksek (yellow card) 67'	Report		Stadium: Liebenauer Stadium; Referee: Christian-Petru Ciochirca

5 July 2022 Friendly	Fenerbahçe (Turkey)	3–0	(Hungary) Fehérvár	Graz, Austria
18:30 CEST (UTC+2)	Dursun 37'; Rossi 43'; Valencia 61'	Report	Heister (yellow card) 73'; Shabanov (yellow card) 86'	Stadium: Liebenauer Stadium; Referee: Jakob Semler

10 July 2022 Friendly	Fenerbahçe (Turkey)	2–0	(England) Hull City	Sakarya, Turkey
20:30 TRT (UTC+3)	Güler 87'; Dursun 88'	Report	Fleming (yellow card) 86'	Stadium: New Sakarya Stadium; Referee: Onur Özütoprak

=== Mid-season ===
30 November 2022 Friendly	Fenerbahçe (Turkey)	3–1	(Spain) Rayo Vallecano	Istanbul, Turkey
20:00 TRT (UTC+3)	Crespo (yellow card) 24'; Szalai (yellow card) 58'; Osayi-Samuel 71' (pen.); King 76'; Kadıoğlu 83'	Report	Trejo 22'; López (yellow card) 32'; Comesaña (yellow card) 55'; Mumin (yellow card) 69'	Stadium: Şükrü Saracoğlu Stadium; Referee: Atilla Karaoğlan

3 December 2022 Friendly	Fenerbahçe (Turkey)	2–1	(Spain) Villarreal	Istanbul, Turkey
19:00 TRT (UTC+3)	Dursun 31' (pen.); King 78'; Bruma (yellow card) 87'; Szalai (yellow card) 89'	Report	Capoue 24'; Baena (yellow card) 82'	Stadium: Şükrü Saracoğlu Stadium; Referee: Erkan Özdamar

7 December 2022 Friendly	Alanyaspor (Turkey)	2–4	(Turkey) Fenerbahçe	Antalya, Turkey
19:00 TRT (UTC+3)	Bekiroğlu 78'; Candeias 90+1'	Report	Kahveci 28'; Dursun (penalty missed) 36', 41', 51'; Lincoln 47'	Stadium: Kırbıyık Holding Stadium; Referee: Burak Şeker

10 December 2022 Friendly	Fenerbahçe (Turkey)	3–0	(Italy) Salernitana	Antalya, Turkey
16:00 TRT (UTC+3)	Kahveci 34'; King 58'; Batshuayi 90+2' (pen.)	Report	Coulibaly (yellow card) 41'	Stadium: Kırbıyık Holding Stadium; Referee: Murat Erdoğan

18 February 2023 Friendly	Fenerbahçe (Turkey)	4–2	(Turkey) Fatih Karagümrük	Istanbul, Turkey
17:00 TRT (UTC+3)	Aziz; Zajc; Valencia; Dursun	Report	Diagne; Shukurov	Stadium: Fenerbahçe Can Bartu Facilities

23 March 2023 Friendly	Fenerbahçe (Turkey)	2–2	(Russia) Zenit Saint Petersburg	Istanbul, Turkey
19:00 TRT (UTC+3)	Yandaş 7'; João Pedro (penalty missed) 34'; Aydınlık 68'	Report	Malcom 21' (pen.); Claudinho 42' (yellow card) 43'; Bakayev (yellow card) 50'; Wendel (yellow card) 84'	Stadium: Şükrü Saracoğlu Stadium; Referee: Cihan Aydın

== Competitions ==
=== Overall record ===
Competition	First match	Last match	Starting round	Final position	Record							
Competition	First match	Last match	Starting round	Final position	Pld	W	D	L	GF	GA	GD	Win %
Süper Lig	8 August 2022	4 June 2023	Matchday 1	2nd	36	25	5	6	87	42	+45	69.44
Turkish Cup	20 December 2022	11 June 2023	Fifth round	Winners	6	5	1	0	14	3	+11	83.33
UEFA Champions League	20 July 2022	27 July 2022	Second qualifying round	Second qualifying round	2	0	1	1	1	2	−1	0.00
UEFA Europa League	4 August 2022	16 March 2023	Third qualifying round	Round of 16	12	8	3	1	24	11	+13	66.67
Total					56	38	10	8	126	58	+68	67.86

Source: Soccerway

=== Süper Lig ===
==== League table ====
Pos	Team	Pld	W	D	L	GF	GA	GD	Pts	Qualification or relegation
1	Galatasaray (C)	36	28	4	4	83	27	+56	88	Qualification for the Champions League second qualifying round
2	Fenerbahçe	36	25	5	6	87	42	+45	80	Qualification for the Europa Conference League second qualifying round
3	Beşiktaş	36	23	9	4	78	36	+42	78	Qualification for the Europa Conference League second qualifying round
4	Adana Demirspor	36	20	9	7	76	45	+31	69	Qualification for the Europa Conference League second qualifying round
5	Başakşehir	36	18	8	10	54	37	+17	62	

Source: Süper Lig
Rules for classification: 1) Points; 2) Head-to-head points; 3) Head-to-head goal difference; 4) Head-to-head goals scored; 5) Goal difference; 6) Goals scored; 7) Play-off.
(C) Champions

==== Results summary ====
Overall								Home						Away					
Pld	W	D	L	GF	GA	GD	Pts	W	D	L	GF	GA	GD	W	D	L	GF	GA	GD
36	25	5	6	87	42	+45	80	13	2	3	50	24	+26	12	3	3	37	18	+19

Source: TFF.org

Pld = Matches played; W = Matches won; D = Matches drawn; L = Matches lost; GF = Goals for; GA = Goals against; GD = Goal difference; Pts = Points

==== Results by round ====
Round	1	2	3	4	5	6	7	8	9	10	11	12	13	14	15	16	17	18	19	20	21	22	23	24	25	26	27	28	29	30	31	32	33	34	35	36	37	38
Ground	H	A	H	A	H	B	H	A	H	A	H	A	H	H	A	H	A	H	A	A	H	A	H	A	B	A	H	A	H	A	H	A	A	H	A	H	A	H
Result	D	W	W	L	W	B	W	D	W	W	W	W	W	L	L	W	W	L	W	W	W	D	W	W	B	W	L	W	W	W	D	W	D	W	W	W	L	W
Position	7	3	1	5	3	7	6	7	4	2	1	1	1	1	2	2	2	2	2	2	2	2	2	2	2	2	2	2	2	2	2	2	2	2	2	2	2	2

Source: TFF.org
A = Away; H = Home; B = Bye; W = Win; D = Draw; L = Loss

==== Matches ====
8 August 2022 1	Fenerbahçe	3–3	Ümraniyespor	Istanbul
21:45 TRT (UTC+3)	Arão (yellow card) 12'; Valencia 19' (pen.), 45+2', (yellow card) 22'; Peres (yellow card) 70'; Lincoln (yellow card) 76'; Gustavo Henrique (yellow card) 77'; Berisha (yellow card) 83', (goal) 90+2'; Kadıoğlu (yellow card) 90+5'	Report	Glumac 29'; Bettaieb (yellow card) 41'; Gheorghe 67'; Mršić 73' (pen.); Nefiz (yellow card) 76'	Stadium: Şükrü Saracoğlu Stadium; Attendance: 37,456; Referee: Yaşar Kemal Uğurlu

15 August 2022 2	Kasımpaşa	0–6	Fenerbahçe	Istanbul
21:45 TRT (UTC+3)	Yeşilyurt (red card) 16'; Hadergjonaj (yellow card) 21'; Hajradinović (yellow card) 42'; Bahoken (yellow card) 54'	Report	King 8'; Valencia 34', 58'; Kadıoğlu (yellow card) 42'; Mor 45+3'; Güler 86', 90+2'	Stadium: Recep Tayyip Erdoğan Stadium; Attendance: 4,811; Referee: Mete Kalkavan

22 August 2022 3	Fenerbahçe	4–2	Adana Demirspor	Istanbul
21:45 TRT (UTC+3)	Valencia 20' (pen.), 41'; Arão (yellow card) 45+4'; Zajc 47', (yellow card) 49'; Szalai (yellow card) 53'; Alioski 83'	Report	Akaydın (yellow card) 13'; Belhanda (yellow card) 18', (goal) 56' (pen.); David (yellow card) 38'; Dzyuba 66'; Onyekuru (yellow card) 67'; Rakitskyi (red card) 82'	Stadium: Şükrü Saracoğlu Stadium; Attendance: 41,686; Referee: Abdulkadir Bitigen

29 August 2022 4	Konyaspor	1–0	Fenerbahçe	Eskişehir (Note: Due to the ongoing ground maintenance and repair works in the Konya Metropolitan Municipality Stadium, it has been moved to another stadium.)
19:15 TRT (UTC+3)	Demirbağ (yellow card) 24' (yellow-red card) 54'; Demir 66'; Calvo (yellow card) 89'; Dikmen (yellow card) 90+4'	Report	Valencia (red card) 22'	Stadium: New Eskişehir Stadium; Attendance: 14,172; Referee: Arda Kardeşler

3 September 2022 5	Fenerbahçe	2–0	Kayserispor	Istanbul
21:45 TRT (UTC+3)	João Pedro 37'; King 50'; Kadıoğlu (yellow card) 70'; Szalai (yellow card) 87'	Report	Campanharo (yellow card) 75'; Mensah (yellow card) 82'	Stadium: Şükrü Saracoğlu Stadium; Attendance: 38,827; Referee: Ali Palabıyık

6	Bye

18 September 2022 7	Fenerbahçe	5–0	Alanyaspor	Istanbul
20:00 TRT (UTC+3)	Rossi 5'; Gustavo Henrique 17'; João Pedro (penalty missed) 45+3'; Crespo 45+4'; Valencia 70'; Kahveci 76'	Report	Bekiroğlu (yellow card) 31'; Balkovec (yellow card) 71'	Stadium: Şükrü Saracoğlu Stadium; Attendance: 39,595; Referee: Hüseyin Göçek

2 October 2022 8	Beşiktaş	0–0	Fenerbahçe	Istanbul
20:00 TRT (UTC+3)	Masuaku (yellow card) 45'; Fernandes (yellow card) 90+3'	Report	Crespo (yellow card) 42'; Batshuayi (yellow card) 83'	Stadium: Vodafone Park; Attendance: 39,317; Referee: Volkan Bayarslan

9 October 2022 9	Fenerbahçe	5–4	Fatih Karagümrük	Istanbul
20:00 TRT (UTC+3)	Crespo 9', (yellow card) 55'; Valencia 28', 62' (pen.), 73' (pen.); Batshuayi 90+5'	Report	Borini 16', 66' (pen.), (yellow card) 79'; Kouassi 24'; Dursun (yellow card) 27'; Shukurov (yellow card) 58'; Nicholas (yellow card) 71'; Kapacak 83'	Stadium: Şükrü Saracoğlu Stadium; Attendance: 39,537; Referee: Atilla Karaoğlan

17 October 2022 10	Ankaragücü	0–3	Fenerbahçe	Ankara
20:00 TRT (UTC+3)	Malcuit (yellow card) 45+1'; Güreler (yellow card) 47'	Report	Batshuayi 3'; Kahveci 25'; Osayi-Samuel (yellow card) 57'; Rossi 90+1'	Stadium: Eryaman Stadium; Attendance: 17,450; Referee: Halil Umut Meler

22 October 2022 11	Fenerbahçe	1–0	İstanbul Başakşehir	Istanbul
20:00 TRT (UTC+3)	Kahveci (yellow card) 62'; Rossi 84'	Report	Türüç (yellow card) 61'; Tekdemir (yellow card) 69'	Stadium: Şükrü Saracoğlu Stadium; Attendance: 42,079; Referee: Zorbay Küçük

30 October 2022 12	İstanbulspor	2–5	Fenerbahçe	Istanbul
20:00 TRT (UTC+3)	Topalli 48', 67'; Ebert (yellow card) 77'	Report	Batshuayi 18' (pen.), 49', 88'; Kahveci 36'; Aziz (yellow card) 64'; Valencia 86'	Stadium: Atatürk Olympic Stadium; Attendance: 15,871; Referee: Mustafa Kürşad Filiz

7 November 2022 13	Fenerbahçe	1–0	Sivasspor	Istanbul
20:00 TRT (UTC+3)	Crespo (yellow card) 25'; Mor (yellow card) 40'; Batshuayi (yellow card) 45+4' (yellow-red card) 48'; Valencia 55' (pen.); Zajc (yellow card) 75'; Aziz (yellow card) 87'; Bayındır (yellow card) 90+7'	Report	Yeşilyurt (yellow card) 19'; Keïta (yellow card) 35'; Yalçın (yellow card) 60'; Osmanpaşa (yellow card) 69'; Saba (yellow card) 89'; Erdal (yellow card) 90+9'	Stadium: Şükrü Saracoğlu Stadium; Attendance: 40,349; Referee: Hüseyin Göçek

12 November 2022 14	Fenerbahçe	1–2	Giresunspor	Istanbul
17:00 TRT (UTC+3)	João Pedro (yellow card) 13' (yellow-red card) 40'; Valencia 19' (pen.)	Report	Pérez (yellow card) 26'; Arias (yellow card) 46'; Uludağ (yellow card) 63'; Sainz 71', 83'	Stadium: Şükrü Saracoğlu Stadium; Attendance: 41,203; Referee: Arda Kardeşler

24 December 2022 15	Trabzonspor	2–0	Fenerbahçe	Trabzon
19:00 TRT (UTC+3)	Trézéguet (yellow card) 18', (goal) 90+11'; Gómez (yellow card) 21', (goal) 61'; Bakasetas (yellow card) 42'; Hugo (yellow card) 55'	Report	Batshuayi (yellow card) 42'; Eğribayat (yellow card) 42'; Crespo (yellow card) 45+7' (yellow-red card) 57'; Yandaş (yellow card) 62'	Stadium: Şenol Güneş Sports Complex; Attendance: 35,705; Referee: Halil Umut Meler

27 December 2022 16	Fenerbahçe	4–0	Hatayspor	Istanbul
20:00 TRT (UTC+3)	King 20', (yellow card) 51'; Batshuayi 26'; Dursun 86'; Gustavo Henrique 90+5'; Yandaş (yellow card) 90+6'	Report	Adekugbe (yellow card) 15'; Yıldırım (yellow card) 71'; Ergün (yellow card) 85'	Stadium: Şükrü Saracoğlu Stadium; Attendance: 32,961; Referee: Sarper Barış Saka

3 January 2023 17	Antalyaspor	1–2	Fenerbahçe	Antalya
20:00 TRT (UTC+3)	Wright 14'; Fernando (yellow card) 26'; Fredy (yellow card) 35'; Vural (yellow card) 61'; Bayrakdar (yellow card) 90+10'	Report	Aziz (yellow card) 6'; Batshuayi 55', 62' (pen.); Alioski (yellow card) 87'	Stadium: Antalya Stadium; Attendance: 24,002; Referee: Kadir Sağlam

8 January 2023 18	Fenerbahçe	0–3	Galatasaray	Istanbul
19:00 TRT (UTC+3)	Gustavo Henrique (yellow card) 11'; Kahveci (red card) 86'; Valencia (yellow card) 87'; Yandaş (yellow card) 87'	Report	Boey (yellow card) 26'; Oliveira (yellow card) 26', (goal) 32'; Nelsson (yellow card) 34'; Mertens (yellow card) 45+8'; Kutlu (yellow card) 75'; Aktürkoğlu 78'; Dubois (yellow card) 87'; Icardi 90+10', (yellow card) 90+11'	Stadium: Şükrü Saracoğlu Stadium; Attendance: 45,798; Referee: Halil Umut Meler

15 January 2023 19	Gaziantep	1–2	Fenerbahçe	Gaziantep
19:00 TRT (UTC+3)	Maxim (yellow card) 19'; Djilobodji (yellow card) 47'; Kitsiou 55'; Sagal (yellow card) 59' (yellow-red card) 70'; Jevtović (yellow card) 90+4'	Report	Mor (yellow card) 7'; Valencia 8', 90+1'; Szalai (yellow card) 73'; Dursun (yellow card) 90'	Stadium: Gaziantep Stadium; Attendance: 13,426; Referee: Mustafa Kürşad Filiz

23 January 2023 20	Ümraniyespor	1–2	Fenerbahçe	Istanbul
20:00 TRT (UTC+3)	Nayir 78'; Özdemir (yellow card) 90+2'; Atasaray (yellow card) 90+10' (yellow-red card) 90+10'	Report	Lincoln (yellow card) 12'; Batshuayi 73', (yellow card) 88'; Glumac 89' (o.g.); Mor (yellow card) 90+4'; Zajc (yellow card) 90+15'	Stadium: Ümraniye Municipality City Stadium; Attendance: 2,606; Referee: Abdulkadir Bitigen

29 January 2023 21	Fenerbahçe	5–1	Kasımpaşa	Istanbul
19:00 TRT (UTC+3)	Valencia 37' (pen.), 39', 52', 59'; Güler (yellow card) 45'; Crespo (yellow card) 89'; Batshuayi 90+2'	Report	Donk (yellow card) 10'; Fall 24'; Tırpan (yellow card) 26'; Kara (yellow card) 90'; Çiftpınar (yellow card) 90+5'	Stadium: Şükrü Saracoğlu Stadium; Attendance: 38,030; Referee: Volkan Bayarslan

2 February 2023 22	Adana Demirspor	1–1	Fenerbahçe	Adana
20:00 TRT (UTC+3)	Belhanda (penalty missed) 32'; Onyekuru (yellow card) 45+10'; Svensson (yellow card) 75'; Ndiaye 83' (pen.)	Report	Kahveci (yellow card) 30'; Batshuayi (yellow card) 74'; Bayındır (yellow card) 83'; Valencia 88'	Stadium: New Adana Stadium; Attendance: 29,298; Referee: Ali Palabıyık

25 February 2023 23	Fenerbahçe	4–0	Konyaspor	Istanbul
19:00 TRT (UTC+3)	Arão (yellow card) 8'; Valencia 13' (pen.), 45+6'; King 61'; Szalai 78'	Report	Calvo (yellow card) 3'; Diouf (yellow card) 14' (yellow-red card) 22'; Oğuz (yellow card) 16'	Stadium: Şükrü Saracoğlu Stadium; Attendance: 36,259; Referee: Halil Umut Meler
Note: Originally scheduled for 6 February 2023. Postponed after the 2023 Turkey–Syria earthquake. Rescheduled to 25 February 2023.

4 March 2023 24	Kayserispor	1–2	Fenerbahçe	Kayseri
19:00 TRT (UTC+3)	Kocaman 90+6'	Report	Valencia 6'; Szalai (yellow card) 58'; Kadıoğlu 67'	Stadium: Kadir Has Stadium; Attendance: 12,370; Referee: Atilla Karaoğlan
Note: Originally scheduled for 12 February 2023. Postponed after the 2023 Turkey–Syria earthquake. Rescheduled to 4 March 2023.

25	Bye

19 March 2023 26	Alanyaspor	1–3	Fenerbahçe	Antalya
19:00 TRT (UTC+3)	Koulouris 6'; Bayır (yellow card) 45+8'; Özdemir (yellow card) 90+6'	Report	Osayi-Samuel (yellow card) 19'; Valencia 65' (pen.), 85' (pen.), (yellow card) 82'; Mor 90+2'	Stadium: Kırbıyık Holding Stadium; Attendance: 7,840; Referee: Mete Kalkavan

2 April 2023 27	Fenerbahçe	2–4	Beşiktaş	Istanbul
20:30 TRT (UTC+3)	Akaydin (yellow card) 30'; Yandaş (yellow card) 37'; Valencia 41' (pen.) (penalty missed) 53'; Osayi-Samuel (yellow card) 45+7'; Kahveci 90+5'	Report	Welinton (yellow card) 28' (yellow-red card) 51'; Aboubakar (yellow card) 30', (goal) 90+1'; Colley (yellow card) 45+2'; Fernandes (yellow card) 48'; Tosun 58', 62'; Maxim (yellow card) 75'; Redmond 75'	Stadium: Şükrü Saracoğlu Stadium; Attendance: 43,899; Referee: Halil Umut Meler

10 April 2023 28	Fatih Karagümrük	1–2	Fenerbahçe	Istanbul
20:30 TRT (UTC+3)	Ozdoyev 24'; Ricci (yellow card) 50'	Report	Kadıoğlu (yellow card) 42'; Zajc 51'; Szalai 78'	Stadium: Atatürk Olympic Stadium; Attendance: 2,083; Referee: Abdulkadir Bitigen

15 April 2023 29	Fenerbahçe	2–1	Ankaragücü	Istanbul
20:30 TRT (UTC+3)	Yüksek (yellow card) 45+1'; Valencia 87' (pen.); Crespo 90+6'; Osayi-Samuel (yellow card) 90+10'	Report	Diack (yellow card) 72'; Đokanović (yellow card) 74'; Sowe 80'; Hanousek (yellow card) 84'; Çankaya (yellow card) 85'; Kitsiou (yellow card) 86'; Mujakić (yellow card) 90+8'; Milson (yellow card) 90+11'	Stadium: Şükrü Saracoğlu Stadium; Attendance: 32,587; Referee: Atilla Karaoğlan

19 April 2023 30	İstanbul Başakşehir	1–2	Fenerbahçe	Istanbul
20:30 TRT (UTC+3)	Aleksić 30', (yellow card) 74'; Szysz (yellow card) 45+1'; Biglia (yellow card) 50'; Şahiner (yellow card) 50' (yellow-red card) 90+7'; Touba (yellow card) 67' (yellow-red card) 70'; Tekdemir (yellow card) 82'; Şengezer (yellow card) 85'	Report	João Pedro 88', 90+3'	Stadium: Başakşehir Fatih Terim Stadium; Attendance: 5,354; Referee: Suat Arslanboğa

24 April 2023 31	Fenerbahçe	3–3	İstanbulspor	Istanbul
20:00 TRT (UTC+3)	Güler 25', 51'; Mor (yellow card) 44'; Akaydin (yellow card) 45+2'; Kadıoğlu (yellow card) 55'; João Pedro 71'	Report	Erdoğan (yellow card) 44'; Ethemi 57' (pen.), 66'; Ersoy (yellow card) 86'; Sarıkaya (yellow card) 90+3'; Eze 90+6'	Stadium: Şükrü Saracoğlu Stadium; Attendance: 39,015; Referee: Kadir Sağlam

29 April 2023 32	Sivasspor	1–3	Fenerbahçe	Sivas
19:00 TRT (UTC+3)	Caicedo 76'	Report	Rossi 22'; Kadıoğlu 45+1', 45+10'; Kahveci (red card) 45+5'; Osayi-Samuel (yellow card) 60'; Arão (yellow card) 71'; Eğribayat (yellow card) 82'; Yandaş (yellow card) 83'	Stadium: New Sivas 4 Eylül Stadium; Attendance: 12,622; Referee: Zorbay Küçük

7 May 2023 33	Giresunspor	1–1	Fenerbahçe	Giresun
19:00 TRT (UTC+3)	Seven (yellow card) 26'; Bajić 68'; Arias (yellow card) 70'; Uludağ (yellow card) 87'; Genç (yellow card) 90+5'; Piri (yellow card) 90+9'	Report	Batshuayi 20' (pen.); Yüksek (yellow card) 45+1'; Osayi-Samuel (yellow card) 90+8'	Stadium: Çotanak Sports Complex; Attendance: 7,499; Referee: Bahattin Şimşek

18 May 2023 34	Fenerbahçe	3–1	Trabzonspor	Istanbul
20:00 TRT (UTC+3)	Batshuayi 11'; Peres 58'; Valencia 71'	Report	Elmalı (yellow card) 67'; Trézéguet 80' (pen.); Türkmen (yellow card) 90'	Stadium: Şükrü Saracoğlu Stadium; Attendance: 32,622; Referee: Abdulkadir Bitigen

35	Hatayspor	0–3 (w/o)	Fenerbahçe	Hatay
		Report		Stadium: New Hatay Stadium
Note: Hatayspor withdrew from the league due to the 2023 Turkey–Syria earthquake and Fenerbahçe, therefore, were awarded a 3–0 win.

30 May 2023 36	Fenerbahçe	2–0	Antalyaspor	Istanbul
20:00 TRT (UTC+3)	Valencia 2'; Kahveci (yellow card) 46'; Zajc 90+5'	Report	Rakip (yellow card) 17'; Balcı (yellow card) 57'; Sarı (yellow card) 88'	Stadium: Şükrü Saracoğlu Stadium; Attendance: 29,564; Referee: Zorbay Küçük

4 June 2023 37	Galatasaray	3–0	Fenerbahçe	Istanbul
19:00 TRT (UTC+3)	Nelsson (yellow card) 12'; Zaniolo 28', 79'; Icardi 71'	Report	Kahveci (yellow card) 36'; Peres (red card) 61'; Zajc (yellow card) 82'; Yüksek (yellow card) 90+2'	Stadium: Nef Stadium; Attendance: 50,453; Referee: Abdulkadir Bitigen

38	Fenerbahçe	3–0 (w/o)	Gaziantep	Istanbul
		Report		Stadium: Şükrü Saracoğlu Stadium
Note: Gaziantep withdrew from the league due to the 2023 Turkey–Syria earthquake and Fenerbahçe, therefore, were awarded a 3–0 win.

=== Turkish Cup ===
20 December 2022 Fifth round	Fenerbahçe	3–1	İstanbulspor	Istanbul
21:00 TRT (UTC+3)	King 31'; Batshuayi 34', 54'	Report	Kabasakal (yellow card) 60'; Rroca (yellow card) 73'; Erdoğan (yellow card) 82'; Topalli 90+3'	Stadium: Şükrü Saracoğlu Stadium; Referee: Volkan Bayarslan

19 January 2023 Round of 16	Fenerbahçe	2–1	Çaykur Rizespor	Istanbul
20:30 TRT (UTC+3)	Zajc 12'; Valencia 89'	Report	Osmanoğlu 26'; Pala (yellow card) 56'; Yılmaz (yellow card) 73'	Stadium: Şükrü Saracoğlu Stadium; Referee: Bahattin Şimşek

6 April 2023 Quarter-finals	Fenerbahçe	4–1	Kayserispor	Istanbul
20:30 TRT (UTC+3)	Mor 8', 42'; Dursun 58'; Yandaş (yellow card) 73'; Güler 90'	Report	Kolovetsios 18'; Mensah (yellow card) 76'	Stadium: Şükrü Saracoğlu Stadium; Referee: Volkan Bayarslan
Note: Originally scheduled for 28 February–2 March 2023. Postponed after the 2023 Turkey–Syria earthquake. Rescheduled to 6 April 2023.

3 May 2023 Semi-finals; First leg	Sivasspor	0–0	Fenerbahçe	Sivas
20:30 TRT (UTC+3)	Çiftçi (yellow card) 55'	Report	Kahveci (yellow card) 74'	Stadium: New Sivas 4 Eylül Stadium; Referee: Atilla Karaoğlan

24 May 2023 Semi-finals; Second leg	Fenerbahçe	3–0 (3–0 agg.)	Sivasspor	Istanbul
20:30 TRT (UTC+3)	Kadıoğlu 47'; Batshuayi 58'; King 85'	Report	Charisis (yellow card) 18'; Sáiz (yellow card) 59'	Stadium: Şükrü Saracoğlu Stadium; Referee: Volkan Bayarslan

11 June 2023 Final	Fenerbahçe	2–0	İstanbul Başakşehir	İzmir
20:45 TRT (UTC+3)	Batshuayi 1', 29'; Zajc (yellow card) 14'; Aziz (yellow card) 88'	Report	Türüç (yellow card) 67'; Kény (yellow card) 88'	Stadium: Gürsel Aksel Stadium; Attendance: 12,182; Referee: Atilla Karaoğlan

=== UEFA Champions League ===
==== Second qualifying round ====
20 July 2022 First leg	Dynamo Kyiv (Ukraine)	0–0	(Turkey) Fenerbahçe	Łódź, Poland (Note: Due to the Russian invasion of Ukraine, Ukrainian teams are required to play their home matches at neutral venues until further notice.)
20:00 CEST (UTC+2)	Sydorchuk (yellow card) 58'; Besedin (yellow card) 73'; Harmash (yellow card) 90+1'	Report	King (yellow card) 31'; Dursun (yellow card) 87'	Stadium: Stadion Miejski im. Władysława Króla; Attendance: 11,603; Referee: Glenn Nyberg (Sweden)

27 July 2022 Second leg	Fenerbahçe (Turkey)	1–2 (a.e.t.) (1–2 agg.)	(Ukraine) Dynamo Kyiv	Istanbul, Turkey
20:00 TRT (UTC+3)	Yüksek (yellow card) 29' (yellow-red card) 53'; Osayi-Samuel (yellow card) 37'; Valencia (yellow card) 45+2', (penalty missed) 70'; Szalai 89', (yellow card) 98'	Report	Tsyhankov (yellow card) 13'; Sydorchuk (yellow card) 33'; Dubinchak (yellow card) 45+2'; Buyalskyi 57', (yellow card) 58'; Shaparenko (yellow card) 60'; Popov (yellow card) 68'; Harmash (yellow card) 111'; Karavayev 114'	Stadium: Şükrü Saracoğlu Stadium; Attendance: 40,000; Referee: Massimiliano Irrati (Italy)

=== UEFA Europa League ===
==== Third qualifying round ====
4 August 2022 First leg	Fenerbahçe (Turkey)	3–0	(Czech Republic) Slovácko	Istanbul, Turkey
20:00 TRT (UTC+3)	Mor 17', (yellow card) 55'; Lincoln 45+2', 81'	Report	Hofmann (yellow card) 27' (yellow-red card) 48'; Trávník (yellow card) 65'; Sinyavskiy (yellow card) 90+2'	Stadium: Şükrü Saracoğlu Stadium; Attendance: 35,536; Referee: João Pinheiro (Portugal)

11 August 2022 Second leg	Slovácko (Czech Republic)	1–1 (1–4 agg.)	(Turkey) Fenerbahçe	Uherské Hradiště, Czech Republic
19:00 CEST (UTC+2)	Doski (yellow card) 43'; Šašinka 58'	Report	Peres (yellow card) 16'; Dursun 56'; Mor (yellow card) 88'	Stadium: Městský fotbalový stadion Miroslava Valenty; Attendance: 6,520; Referee: Nikola Dabanović (Montenegro)

==== Play-off round ====
18 August 2022 First leg	Austria Wien	0–2	(Turkey) Fenerbahçe	Vienna, Austria
21:00 CEST (UTC+2)	Galvão (yellow card) 49' (yellow-red card) 83'; Früchtl (yellow card) 90'	Report	King 8'; Alioski (yellow card) 31'; Yüksek (yellow card) 73'; Dursun 89'	Stadium: Franz Horr Stadium; Attendance: 14,000; Referee: Daniel Siebert (Germany)

25 August 2022 Second leg	Fenerbahçe (Turkey)	4–1 (6–1 agg.)	Austria Wien	Istanbul, Turkey
20:00 TRT (UTC+3)	Yüksek 8'; Kahveci 44', 70'; Yandaş 79'	Report	Da Graça (yellow card) 30', (goal) 45+1'; Kreiker (yellow card) 82'	Stadium: Şükrü Saracoğlu Stadium; Attendance: 35,350; Referee: Jesús Gil Manzano (Spain)

==== Group stage ====
Pos	Team	Pld	W	D	L	GF	GA	GD	Pts	Qualification	FEN	REN	AEK	DKV
1	(Turkey) Fenerbahçe	6	4	2	0	13	7	+6	14	Advance to round of 16	—	3–3	2–0	2–1
2	(France) Rennes	6	3	3	0	11	8	+3	12	Advance to knockout round play-offs	2–2	—	1–1	2–1
3	(Cyprus) AEK Larnaca	6	1	2	3	7	10	−3	5	Transfer to Europa Conference League	1–2	1–2	—	3–3
4	(Ukraine) Dynamo Kyiv	6	0	1	5	5	11	−6	1		0–2	0–1	0–1	—

Source: UEFA
Rules for classification: Group stage tiebreakers

8 September 2022 1	Fenerbahçe (Turkey)	2–1	(Ukraine) Dynamo Kyiv	Istanbul, Turkey
19:45 TRT (UTC+3)	Gustavo Henrique 37'; King (yellow card) 50'; Rossi (yellow card) 68'; Yandaş (yellow card) 73'; Alioski (yellow card) 82'; Batshuayi 90+2'; Bayındır (yellow card) 90+6'	Report	Harmash (yellow card) 11'; Tsyhankov 63'; Syrota (yellow card) 78'; Bushchan (yellow card) 87'	Stadium: Şükrü Saracoğlu Stadium; Attendance: 41,895; Referee: Tamás Bognár (Hungary)

15 September 2022 2	Rennes (France)	2–2	(Turkey) Fenerbahçe	Rennes, France
21:00 CEST (UTC+2)	Terrier 52'; Majer 54', (yellow card) 76'; Traoré (red card) 83'; Bourigeaud (yellow card) 90+1'; Rodon (yellow card) 90+3'; Theate (yellow card) 90+4'	Report	Kahveci 60'; Valencia 90+2' (pen.); João Pedro (yellow card) 90+3'	Stadium: Roazhon Park; Attendance: 20,993; Referee: Aleksei Kulbakov (Belarus)

6 October 2022 3	Fenerbahçe (Turkey)	2–0	(Cyprus) AEK Larnaca	Istanbul, Turkey
22:00 TRT (UTC+3)	Batshuayi 26'; Osayi-Samuel (yellow card) 39'; Lincoln (yellow card) 45+2'; Mamas 79' (o.g.)	Report	Oier (yellow card) 9'; Faraj (yellow card) 12'; Altman (yellow card) 39'	Stadium: Şükrü Saracoğlu Stadium; Attendance: 38,860; Referee: Chris Kavanagh (England)

13 October 2022 4	AEK Larnaca (Cyprus)	1–2	(Turkey) Fenerbahçe	Larnaca, Cyprus
19:45 EEST (UTC+3)	Ángel García (yellow card) 38' (yellow-red card) 84'; Mamas (yellow card) 41'; Trichkovski (yellow card) 49', (goal) 52' (pen.); Olatunji (yellow card) 88'; Pons (yellow card) 90+5'; Faraj (yellow card) 90+5'	Report	João Pedro 16'; Güler (yellow card) 33'; Lincoln (yellow card) 43'; Aziz (yellow card) 67'; Batshuayi 80' (pen.); Valencia (penalty missed) 86'; Gustavo Henrique (yellow card) 88'	Stadium: AEK Arena – Georgios Karapatakis; Attendance: 6,947; Referee: Paweł Raczkowski (Poland)

27 October 2022 5	Fenerbahçe (Turkey)	3–3	(France) Rennes	Istanbul, Turkey
19:45 TRT (UTC+3)	Arão (yellow card) 3'; Kahveci (yellow card) 28'; Valencia 42'; Zajc 82'; Mor 88'	Report	Gouiri 5', 30'; Terrier 16'; Doué (yellow card) 73'; Ugochukwu (yellow card) 90+1'; Traoré (yellow card) 90+4'	Stadium: Şükrü Saracoğlu Stadium; Attendance: 34,840; Referee: Novak Simović (Serbia)

3 November 2022 6	Dynamo Kyiv (Ukraine)	0–2	(Turkey) Fenerbahçe	Kraków, Poland (Note: Due to the Russian invasion of Ukraine, Ukrainian teams are required to play their home matches at neutral venues until further notice.)
21:00 CET (UTC+1)	Harmash (yellow card) 52'; Zabarnyi (yellow card) 57' (yellow-red card) 68'; Sydorchuk (yellow card) 90+3'	Report	Güler 23'; Arão 45+2'; Szalai (yellow card) 63'; Mor (yellow card) 90'; Kahveci (yellow card) 90+5'	Stadium: Stadion Cracovii im. Józefa Piłsudskiego; Attendance: 6,304; Referee: Duje Strukan (Croatia)

==== Knockout phase ====
===== Round of 16 =====
As a result of finishing top of the group, Fenerbahçe advanced directly to the round of 16. The round of 16 draw was held on 24 February 2023. Fenerbahçe were a seeded team and drawn to play the second leg at home.

9 March 2023 First leg	Sevilla (Spain)	2–0	(Turkey) Fenerbahçe	Seville, Spain
21:00 CET (UTC+1)	Telles (yellow card) 3'; Gil (yellow card) 45+3'; Jordán 56'; Lamela 85'	Report	Kadıoğlu (yellow card) 45+3'	Stadium: Ramón Sánchez Pizjuán; Attendance: 24,480; Referee: François Letexier (France)

16 March 2023 Second leg	Fenerbahçe (Turkey)	1–0 (1–2 agg.)	(Spain) Sevilla	Istanbul, Turkey
20:45 TRT (UTC+3)	Valencia 41' (pen.); Aziz (yellow card) 45+1'; Yüksek (yellow card) 89'	Report	Badé (yellow card) 45+2'; Jordán (yellow card) 89'	Stadium: Şükrü Saracoğlu Stadium; Attendance: 44,775; Referee: Michael Oliver (England)

== Statistics ==
=== Appearances and goals ===
No.	Pos	Nat	Player	Total		Süper Lig		Turkish Cup		Champions League		Europa League	
No.	Pos	Nat	Player	Apps	Goals	Apps	Goals	Apps	Goals	Apps	Goals	Apps	Goals
Goalkeepers
1	GK	(Turkey) TUR	Altay Bayındır	40	0	26	0	1	0	2	0	11	0
54	GK	(Turkey) TUR	Ertuğrul Çetin	1	0	0	0	0	0	0	0	1	0
59	GK	(Turkey) TUR	Bartu Kulbilge	0	0	0	0	0	0	0	0	0	0
70	GK	(Turkey) TUR	İrfan Can Eğribayat	13	0	8	0	5	0	0	0	0	0
Defenders
2	DF	(Brazil) BRA	Gustavo Henrique	23	3	13	2	1	0	0	0	9	1
3	DF	(Turkey) TUR	Samet Akaydin	23	0	17	0	4	0	0	0	2	0
4	DF	(Turkey) TUR	Serdar Aziz	22	0	14	0	1	0	1	0	6	0
6	DF	(North Macedonia) MKD	Ezgjan Alioski	26	1	17	1	1	0	0	0	8	0
24	DF	(Netherlands) NED	Jayden Oosterwolde	5	0	3	0	1	0	0	0	1	0
28	DF	(Brazil) BRA	Luan Peres	21	1	12	1	4	0	0	0	5	0
30	DF	(Turkey) TUR	Nazım Sangaré	0	0	0	0	0	0	0	0	0	0
41	DF	(Hungary) HUN	Attila Szalai	52	3	32	2	6	0	2	1	12	0
Midfielders
5	MF	(Brazil) BRA	Willian Arão	46	1	31	0	6	0	2	0	7	1
7	MF	(Turkey) TUR	Ferdi Kadıoğlu	48	4	32	3	6	1	2	0	8	0
8	MF	(Turkey) TUR	Mert Hakan Yandaş	24	1	15	0	5	0	0	0	4	1
10	MF	(Turkey) TUR	Arda Güler	35	6	20	4	5	1	1	0	9	1
17	MF	(Turkey) TUR	İrfan Kahveci	43	7	28	4	5	0	2	0	8	3
18	MF	(Brazil) BRA	Lincoln	35	2	21	0	2	0	2	0	10	2
21	MF	(Nigeria) NGR	Bright Osayi-Samuel	38	0	23	0	4	0	2	0	9	0
26	MF	(Slovenia) SLO	Miha Zajc	34	5	23	3	5	1	0	0	6	1
27	MF	(Portugal) POR	Miguel Crespo	36	3	23	3	3	0	0	0	10	0
80	MF	(Turkey) TUR	İsmail Yüksek	32	1	19	0	4	0	2	0	7	1
Forwards
9	FW	(Uruguay) URU	Diego Rossi	51	4	33	4	6	0	2	0	10	0
13	FW	(Ecuador) ECU	Enner Valencia	48	33	31	29	5	1	2	0	10	3
15	FW	(Norway) NOR	Joshua King	27	7	16	4	4	2	2	0	5	1
19	FW	(Turkey) TUR	Serdar Dursun	26	4	18	1	2	1	2	0	4	2
20	FW	(Italy) ITA	João Pedro	28	5	20	4	1	0	0	0	7	1
23	FW	(Belgium) BEL	Michy Batshuayi	32	20	19	12	5	5	0	0	8	3
99	FW	(Turkey) TUR	Emre Mor	38	6	27	2	4	2	0	0	7	2
Players transferred/loaned out during the season
3	DF	(South Korea) KOR	Kim Min-jae	0	0	0	0	0	0	0	0	0	0
6	MF	(Germany) GER	Max Meyer	0	0	0	0	0	0	0	0	0	0
11	FW	(Germany) GER	Mërgim Berisha	1	1	1	1	0	0	0	0	0	0
14	MF	(Turkey) TUR	Emre Demir	0	0	0	0	0	0	0	0	0	0
14	MF	(Greece) GRE	Dimitrios Pelkas	0	0	0	0	0	0	0	0	0	0
20	MF	(Brazil) BRA	Luiz Gustavo	0	0	0	0	0	0	0	0	0	0
22	FW	(Portugal) POR	Bruma	5	0	1	0	0	0	2	0	2	0
23	MF	(Turkey) TUR	Muhammed Gümüşkaya	0	0	0	0	0	0	0	0	0	0
24	FW	(Tanzania) TAN	Mbwana Samatta	0	0	0	0	0	0	0	0	0	0
29	DF	(Uruguay) URU	Mauricio Lemos	5	0	2	0	0	0	0	0	3	0
32	DF	(Democratic Republic of the Congo) COD	Marcel Tisserand	2	0	0	0	0	0	2	0	0	0
33	DF	(Turkey) TUR	Çağtay Kurukalıp	0	0	0	0	0	0	0	0	0	0
37	DF	(Czech Republic) CZE	Filip Novák	4	0	0	0	0	0	1	0	3	0
44	DF	(Sierra Leone) SLE	Steven Caulker	0	0	0	0	0	0	0	0	0	0
58	FW	(Turkey) TUR	Tiago Cukur	0	0	0	0	0	0	0	0	0	0
77	MF	(Turkey) TUR	Burak Kapacak	0	0	0	0	0	0	0	0	0	0
91	FW	(Turkey) TUR	Melih Bostan	0	0	0	0	0	0	0	0	0	0

=== Goalscorers ===
Rank	No.	Pos	Nat	Player	Süper Lig	Turkish Cup	Champions League	Europa League	Total
1	13	FW	(Ecuador)	Enner Valencia	29	1	0	3	33
2	23	FW	(Belgium)	Michy Batshuayi	12	5	0	3	20
3	15	FW	(Norway)	Joshua King	4	2	0	1	7
3	17	MF	(Turkey)	İrfan Kahveci	4	0	0	3	7
5	10	MF	(Turkey)	Arda Güler	4	1	0	1	6
5	99	FW	(Turkey)	Emre Mor	2	2	0	2	6
7	20	MF	(Italy)	João Pedro	4	0	0	1	5
7	26	MF	(Slovenia)	Miha Zajc	3	1	0	1	5
9	7	MF	(Turkey)	Ferdi Kadıoğlu	3	1	0	0	4
9	9	FW	(Uruguay)	Diego Rossi	4	0	0	0	4
9	19	FW	(Turkey)	Serdar Dursun	1	1	0	2	4
12	2	DF	(Brazil)	Gustavo Henrique	2	0	0	1	3
12	27	MF	(Portugal)	Miguel Crespo	3	0	0	0	3
12	41	DF	(Hungary)	Attila Szalai	2	0	1	0	3
15	18	MF	(Brazil)	Lincoln	0	0	0	2	2
16	5	MF	(Brazil)	Willian Arão	0	0	0	1	1
16	6	DF	(North Macedonia)	Ezgjan Alioski	1	0	0	0	1
16	8	MF	(Turkey)	Mert Hakan Yandaş	0	0	0	1	1
16	11	FW	(Germany)	Mërgim Berisha	1	0	0	0	1
16	28	DF	(Brazil)	Luan Peres	1	0	0	0	1
16	80	MF	(Turkey)	İsmail Yüksek	0	0	0	1	1
Own goals					1	0	0	1	2
Awarded					6	0	0	0	6
Totals					87	14	1	24	126

=== Hat-tricks ===
Player	Against	Result	Date	Competition	Ref
(Ecuador) Enner Valencia	Fatih Karagümrük	5–4 (H)	9 October 2022	Süper Lig	
(Belgium) Michy Batshuayi	İstanbulspor	5–2 (H)	30 October 2022	Süper Lig	
(Ecuador) Enner Valencia^{4}	Kasımpaşa	5–1 (H)	29 January 2022	Süper Lig	

(H) – Home; (A) – Away
^{4} Player scored four goals

=== Assists ===
Rank	No.	Pos	Nat	Player	Süper Lig	Turkish Cup	Champions League	Europa League	Total
1	9	FW	(Uruguay)	Diego Rossi	5	0	0	4	9
2	18	MF	(Brazil)	Lincoln	6	0	1	1	8
3	13	FW	(Ecuador)	Enner Valencia	5	2	0	0	7
4	10	MF	(Turkey)	Arda Güler	3	2	0	1	6
5	19	FW	(Turkey)	Serdar Dursun	3	2	0	0	5
6	5	MF	(Brazil)	Willian Arão	4	0	0	0	4
6	7	MF	(Turkey)	Ferdi Kadıoğlu	4	0	0	0	4
6	17	MF	(Turkey)	İrfan Kahveci	2	0	0	2	4
6	26	MF	(Slovenia)	Miha Zajc	4	0	0	0	4
6	27	MF	(Portugal)	Miguel Crespo	2	1	0	1	4
6	99	FW	(Turkey)	Emre Mor	3	1	0	0	4
12	15	FW	(Norway)	Joshua King	1	2	0	0	3
13	8	MF	(Turkey)	Mert Hakan Yandaş	1	0	0	1	2
13	23	FW	(Belgium)	Michy Batshuayi	1	1	0	0	2
13	41	DF	(Hungary)	Attila Szalai	2	0	0	0	2
16	2	DF	(Brazil)	Gustavo Henrique	1	0	0	0	1
16	4	DF	(Turkey)	Serdar Aziz	1	0	0	0	1
16	6	DF	(North Macedonia)	Ezgjan Alioski	0	0	0	1	1
16	20	MF	(Italy)	João Pedro	1	0	0	0	1
16	22	FW	(Portugal)	Bruma	0	0	0	1	1
16	28	DF	(Brazil)	Luan Peres	0	0	0	1	1
16	80	MF	(Turkey)	İsmail Yüksek	1	0	0	0	1
Totals					50	11	1	13	75

=== Clean sheets ===
Rank	No.	Pos	Nat	Player	Süper Lig	Turkish Cup	Champions League	Europa League	Total
1	1	GK	(Turkey)	Altay Bayındır	9	0	1	4	14
2	70	GK	(Turkey)	İrfan Can Eğribayat	1	3	0	0	4
3	54	GK	(Turkey)	Ertuğrul Çetin	0	0	0	1	1
Totals					10	3	1	5	19

=== Disciplinary record ===
No.	Pos	Nat	Player	Süper Lig			Turkish Cup			Champions League			Europa League			Total		
No.	Pos	Nat	Player	Yellow card	(yellow card) (yellow-red card)	Red card	Yellow card	(yellow card) (yellow-red card)	Red card	Yellow card	(yellow card) (yellow-red card)	Red card	Yellow card	(yellow card) (yellow-red card)	Red card	Yellow card	(yellow card) (yellow-red card)	Red card
1	GK	(Turkey)	Altay Bayındır	2	0	0	0	0	0	0	0	0	1	0	0	3	0	0
2	DF	(Brazil)	Gustavo Henrique	2	0	0	0	0	0	0	0	0	1	0	0	3	0	0
3	DF	(Turkey)	Samet Akaydin	2	0	0	0	0	0	0	0	0	0	0	0	2	0	0
4	DF	(Turkey)	Serdar Aziz	3	0	0	1	0	0	0	0	0	2	0	0	6	1	0
5	MF	(Brazil)	Willian Arão	4	0	0	0	0	0	0	0	0	1	0	0	5	0	0
6	DF	(North Macedonia)	Ezgjan Alioski	1	0	0	0	0	0	0	0	0	2	0	0	3	0	0
7	MF	(Turkey)	Ferdi Kadıoğlu	5	0	0	0	0	0	0	0	0	1	0	0	6	0	0
8	MF	(Turkey)	Mert Hakan Yandaş	5	0	0	1	0	0	0	0	0	1	0	0	7	0	0
9	FW	(Uruguay)	Diego Rossi	0	0	0	0	0	0	0	0	0	1	0	0	1	0	0
10	MF	(Turkey)	Arda Güler	1	0	0	0	0	0	0	0	0	1	0	0	2	0	0
13	FW	(Ecuador)	Enner Valencia	3	0	1	0	0	0	1	0	0	0	0	0	4	0	1
15	FW	(Norway)	Joshua King	1	0	0	0	0	0	1	0	0	1	0	0	3	0	0
17	MF	(Turkey)	İrfan Kahveci	4	0	1	1	0	0	0	0	0	2	0	1	7	0	2
18	MF	(Brazil)	Lincoln	2	0	0	0	0	0	0	0	0	2	0	0	4	0	0
19	FW	(Turkey)	Serdar Dursun	1	0	0	0	0	0	1	0	0	0	0	0	2	0	0
20	MF	(Italy)	João Pedro	1	1	0	0	0	0	0	0	0	1	0	0	2	1	0
21	MF	(Nigeria)	Bright Osayi-Samuel	6	0	0	0	0	0	1	0	0	1	0	0	8	0	0
23	FW	(Belgium)	Michy Batshuayi	5	1	0	0	0	0	0	0	0	0	0	0	5	1	0
24	DF	(Netherlands)	Jayden Oosterwolde	0	0	0	0	0	0	0	0	0	0	0	0	0	0	0
26	MF	(Slovenia)	Miha Zajc	4	0	0	1	0	0	0	0	0	0	0	0	4	1	0
27	MF	(Portugal)	Miguel Crespo	5	1	0	0	0	0	0	0	0	0	0	0	5	1	0
28	DF	(Brazil)	Luan Peres	1	0	1	0	0	0	0	0	0	1	0	0	2	0	1
29	DF	(Uruguay)	Mauricio Lemos	0	0	0	0	0	0	0	0	0	0	0	0	0	0	0
30	DF	(Turkey)	Nazım Sangaré	0	0	0	0	0	0	0	0	0	0	0	0	0	0	0
33	DF	(Turkey)	Çağtay Kurukalıp	0	0	0	0	0	0	0	0	0	0	0	0	0	0	0
41	DF	(Hungary)	Attila Szalai	4	0	0	0	0	0	1	0	0	1	0	0	6	0	0
54	GK	(Turkey)	Ertuğrul Çetin	0	0	0	0	0	0	0	0	0	0	0	0	0	0	0
59	GK	(Turkey)	Bartu Kulbilge	0	0	0	0	0	0	0	0	0	0	0	0	0	0	0
70	GK	(Turkey)	İrfan Can Eğribayat	2	0	0	0	0	0	0	0	0	0	0	0	2	0	0
80	MF	(Turkey)	İsmail Yüksek	3	0	0	0	0	0	1	1	0	2	0	0	6	1	0
99	FW	(Turkey)	Emre Mor	4	0	0	0	0	0	0	0	0	3	0	0	7	0	0
