= Ferdi Kadıoğlu =

Turkish footballer

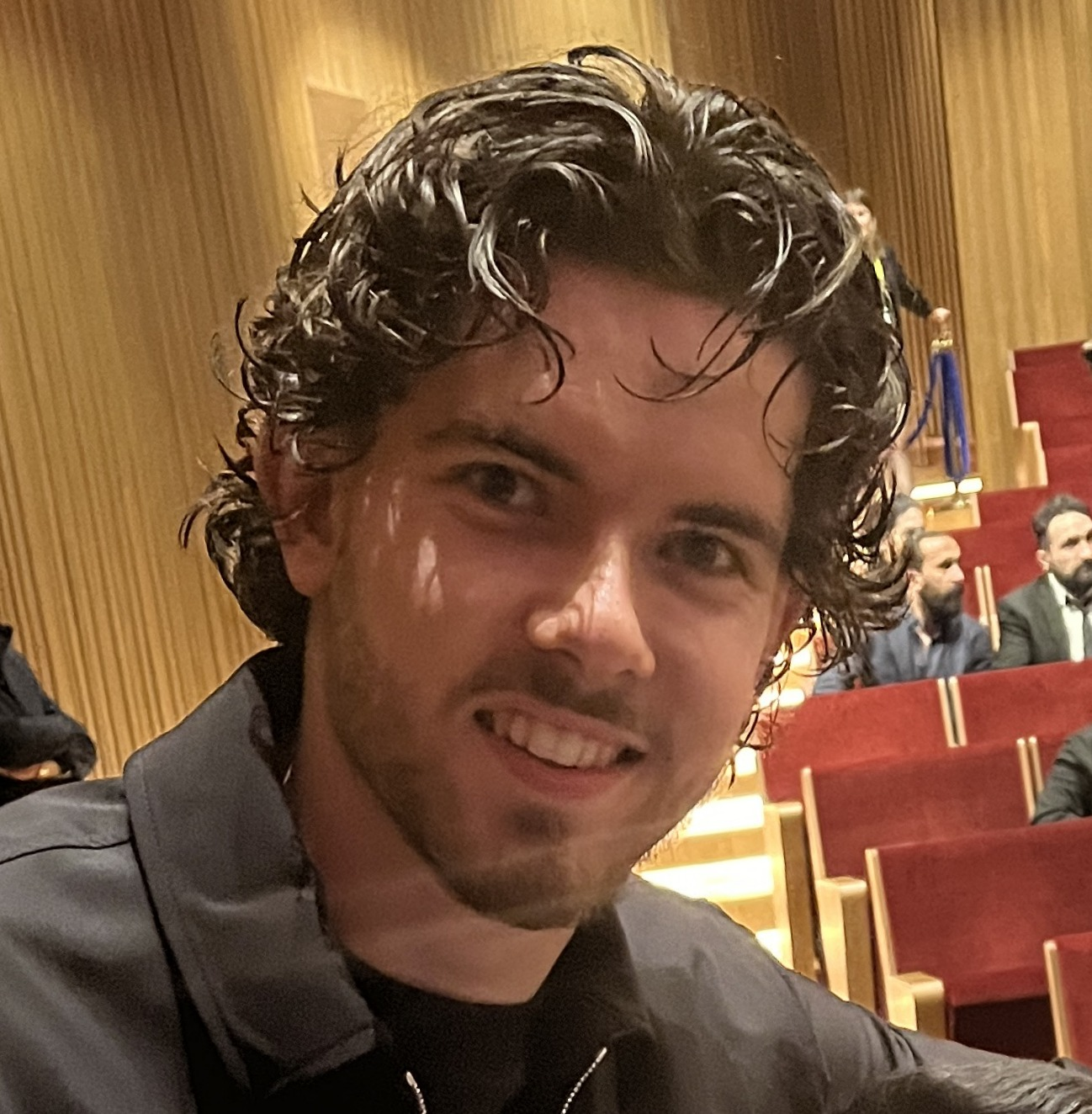
- Kadıoğlu in 2024

Personal information
- Full name: Ferdi Erenay Kadıoğlu
- Date of birth: 7 October 1999 (age 27)
- Place of birth: Arnhem, Netherlands
- Height: 1.78 m (5 ft 10 in)
- Positions: Full back; midfielder; winger

Team information
- Current team: Brighton & Hove Albion
- Number: 24

Youth career
- ESA Rijkerswoerd
- 2008–2016: NEC
- 2018–2019: Fenerbahçe U21

Senior career*
| Years | Team | Apps | (Gls) |
| 2016–2018 | NEC | 61 | (11) |
| 2018–2024 | Fenerbahçe | 148 | (11) |
| 2024– | Brighton & Hove Albion | 50 | (2) |

International career^{‡}
| 2015 | Netherlands U16 | 2 | (1) |
| 2015–2016 | Netherlands U17 | 13 | (2) |
| 2016 | Netherlands U18 | 4 | (0) |
| 2017–2018 | Netherlands U19 | 15 | (6) |
| 2018–2021 | Netherlands U21 | 18 | (1) |
| 2022– | Turkey | 37 | (2) |
- * Club domestic league appearances and goals as of 25 October 2026 ‡ National team caps and goals as of 15 November 2026

Ferdi Erenay Kadıoğlu (Turkish pronunciation: [fæɾˈdi eɾeˈnaj kaˈdɯoːɫu]; born 7 October 1999) is a professional footballer who plays as a full back, midfielder or winger for Premier League club Brighton & Hove Albion. Born in the Netherlands, he plays for the Turkey national team. He is known for his versatility, being able to play in multiple positions on both sides of the field.

Kadıoğlu began his professional career at NEC in 2016, where he played in two seasons for the team, before moving to Fenerbahçe in 2018, spending six years in Süper Lig. He then joined English club Brighton & Hove Albion in 2024.

Kadıoğlu made his senior international debut for Turkey in 2022, and was part of their squad at the UEFA European Championship in 2024, where they made a surprise run to the quarter-finals. He also represented Turkey at the 2026 FIFA World Cup.

== Club career ==
=== NEC ===
==== 2016–2017 season ====
Kadıoğlu spent his early years with NEC. On 28 August 2016, he made his professional debut as a late substitute against AZ Alkmaar in a 2–0 away loss. In his first professional year, he scored 4 goals and made 4 assists in 27 (9 starts) Eredivisie matches. NEC finished the season in 16th position and were relegated to the Eerste Divisie after the relegation play-off. Kadıoğlu also played 3 relegation play-off matches.

==== 2017–2018 season ====
In his second professional year with the team, Kadıoğlu remained a key part of the squad. He scored 7 goals and made 12 assists in 34 (31 starts) Eerste Divisie matches. NEC finished the season in 3rd place but weren't promoted to Eredivisie after losing against Emmen in the promotion play-offs. Kadıoğlu also played 3 promotion second round playoff matches.

=== Fenerbahçe ===
==== 2018–2020: Signing and emergence ====
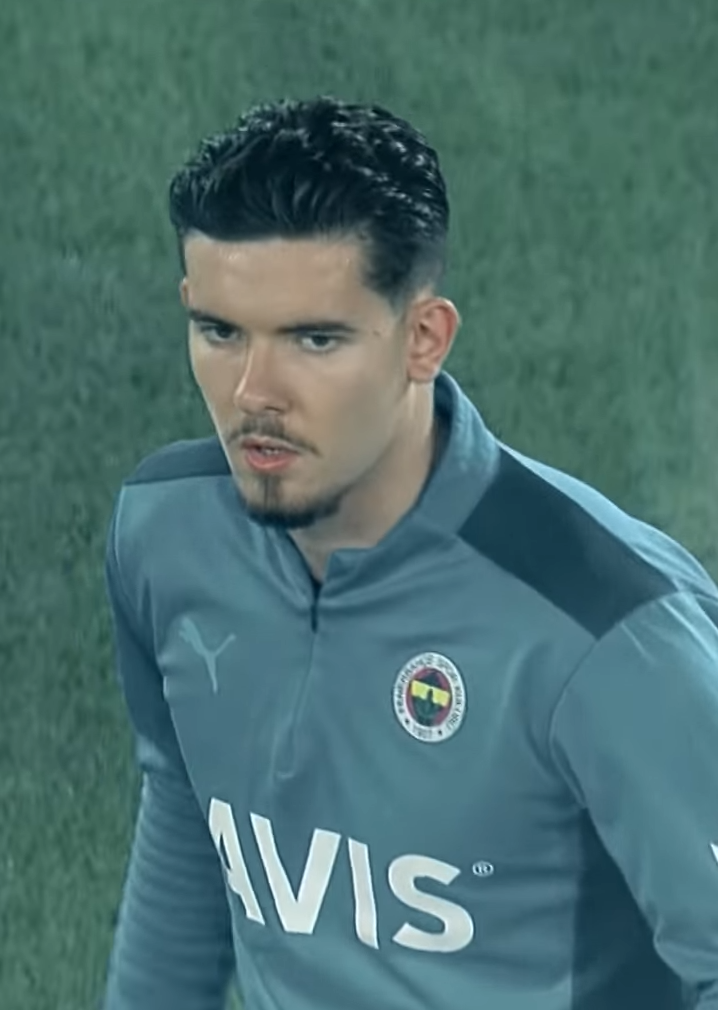
Kadıoğlu before a match in 2021

In July 2018, Kadıoğlu signed for Turkish Süper Lig club Fenerbahçe. He made his debut for the senior squad on 20 December 2018, coming on as a substitute in a Turkish Cup match against Giresunspor. In his first season, he played mostly for the under-21 team, making 11 appearances with them in the U21 Ligi.

The following season he started to find more time in the senior squad and scored his first goal for Fenerbahçe on 19 August 2019 against Gaziantep, netting the final goal in a 5–0 victory.

==== 2020–2022: Increased playing time ====
In his third season, under new manager Erol Bulut, he started to find more time in first team and became one of the key players who took more responsibility on the field.

In the subsequent year, with changes in management, first under Vitor Pereira and then İsmail Kartal, he solidified his starter role. Despite his age, he consistently earned and played full 90-minute matches.

On 17 March 2022, Fenerbahçe announced that they had signed a four-year contract with Kadıoğlu until June 2026.

==== 2022–2024: Key player ====
In his fifth season, he emerged as a versatile player for Fenerbahçe, occupying multiple positions in the first eleven, mainly at both full-back positions. He finished the season with 4 goals and 5 assists across all competitions, amassing a total of 4,175 minutes of playtime.

In his sixth season, he made a very strong start with new coach and club legend İsmail Kartal.

=== Brighton and Hove Albion ===
On 27 August 2024, Kadıoğlu joined Premier League club Brighton & Hove Albion for a reported fee of £25m, with an additional £4.2m in add-ons. He signed a four-year contract.

On 18 September 2024, Kadıoğlu scored his first goal for Brighton in a 3–2 victory over Wolverhampton Wanderers in the third round of the EFL Cup. On 2 November, he scored his first Premier League goal in a 2–1 defeat to Liverpool.

On 19 May 2026, Kadıoğlu was named the Brighton and Hove Albion player of the year for the 2025–26 season.

== International career ==
Kadıoğlu was born in the Netherlands to a Turkish father and a Dutch Canadian mother. He was therefore eligible to represent Turkey, the Netherlands and Canada internationally. He was a youth international for the Netherlands. In March 2021, Kadıoğlu was named to the Netherlands U-21 squad for that year's UEFA European Under-21 Championship. Later that year on 12 November 2021, Turkey coach Stefan Kuntz revealed that he was expecting Kadıoğlu to make his decision on his international future in March 2022. On 3 January 2022, his club Fenerbahçe announced that he had chosen to represent the Turkey national team. On 4 June 2022, Kadıoğlu debuted with Turkey in a 4–0 UEFA Nations League win over the Faroe Islands. On 18 November 2023, he scored his first international goal in a 3–2 friendly win over Germany in Berlin.

On 7 June 2024, Kadıoğlu was named in Turkey's squad by coach Vincenzo Montella for UEFA Euro 2024.

On 2 June 2026, Kadıoğlu was selected in the 26-man squad for the 2026 FIFA World Cup.

== Career statistics ==
=== Club ===
As of match played 25 October 2026

Appearances and goals by club, season and competition
| Club | Season | League | | | National cup (Note: Includes KNVB Cup, Turkish Cup, FA Cup) | | League cup (Note: Includes EFL Cup) | | Europe | | Other | | Total | |
| Club | Season | Division | Apps | Goals | Apps | Goals | Apps | Goals | Apps | Goals | Apps | Goals | Apps | Goals |
|---|---|---|---|---|---|---|---|---|---|---|---|---|---|---|
| NEC | 2016–17 | Eredivisie | 27 | 4 | 4 | 0 | — | | — | | — | | 31 | 4 |
| NEC | 2017–18 | Eerste Divisie | 34 | 7 | 5 | 1 | — | | — | | 0 | 0 | 39 | 8 |
| NEC | Total | | 61 | 11 | 9 | 1 | — | | — | | 0 | 0 | 70 | 12 |
| Fenerbahçe | 2018–19 | Süper Lig | 0 | 0 | 1 | 0 | — | | 0 | 0 | — | | 1 | 0 |
| Fenerbahçe | 2019–20 | Süper Lig | 23 | 4 | 8 | 2 | — | | — | | — | | 31 | 6 |
| Fenerbahçe | 2020–21 | Süper Lig | 26 | 1 | 4 | 0 | — | | — | | — | | 30 | 1 |
| Fenerbahçe | 2021–22 | Süper Lig | 28 | 2 | 1 | 0 | — | | 9 (Note: Seven appearances in UEFA Europa League, two appearances and one goal in UEFA Europa Conference League) | 1 | — | | 38 | 3 |
| Fenerbahçe | 2022–23 | Süper Lig | 31 | 3 | 6 | 1 | — | | 10 (Note: Two appearances in UEFA Champions League, eight appearances in UEFA Europa League) | 0 | — | | 47 | 4 |
| Fenerbahçe | 2023–24 | Süper Lig | 37 | 1 | 2 | 0 | — | | 12 (Note: Appearances in UEFA Europa Conference League) | 2 | 0 | 0 | 51 | 3 |
| Fenerbahçe | 2024–25 | Süper Lig | 2 | 0 | — | | — | | 3 (Note: Appearances in UEFA Champions League) | 1 | — | | 5 | 1 |
| Fenerbahçe | Total | | 148 | 11 | 22 | 3 | — | | 34 | 4 | 0 | 0 | 204 | 18 |
| Brighton & Hove Albion | 2024–25 | Premier League | 6 | 1 | 0 | 0 | 2 | 1 | — | | — | | 8 | 2 |
| Brighton & Hove Albion | 2025–26 | Premier League | 37 | 1 | 2 | 0 | 3 | 0 | — | | — | | 42 | 1 |
| Brighton & Hove Albion | 2026–27 | Premier League | 7 | 0 | 0 | 0 | 1 | 0 | 2 (Note: Appearance in UEFA Conference League) | 0 | — | | 10 | 0 |
| Brighton & Hove Albion | Total | | 50 | 2 | 2 | 0 | 6 | 1 | 2 | 0 | — | | 60 | 3 |
| Career total | | | 259 | 24 | 33 | 4 | 6 | 1 | 36 | 4 | 0 | 0 | 334 | 33 |

=== International ===
As of match played 15 November 2026

Appearances and goals by national team and year
| National team | Year | Apps | Goals |
|---|---|---|---|
| Turkey | 2022 | 7 | 0 |
| Turkey | 2023 | 8 | 1 |
| Turkey | 2024 | 7 | 0 |
| Turkey | 2025 | 6 | 0 |
| Turkey | 2026 | 9 | 1 |
| Total | | 37 | 2 |

Scores and results list Turkey's goal tally first, score column indicates score after each Kadıoğlu goal.

List of international goals scored by Ferdi Kadıoğlu
| No. | Date | Venue | Cap | Opponent | Score | Result | Competition |
|---|---|---|---|---|---|---|---|
| 1 | 18 November 2023 | Olympiastadion, Berlin, Germany | 14 | Germany | 1–1 | 3–2 | Friendly |
| 2 | 26 March 2026 | Beşiktaş Stadium, Istanbul, Turkey | 29 | Romania | 1–0 | 1–0 | 2026 FIFA World Cup qualification |

== Honours ==
Fenerbahçe

- Turkish Cup: 2022–23

Individual

- Brighton & Hove Albion Player of the Year: 2025–26
