= Attila Szalai =

Hungarian footballer (born 1998)

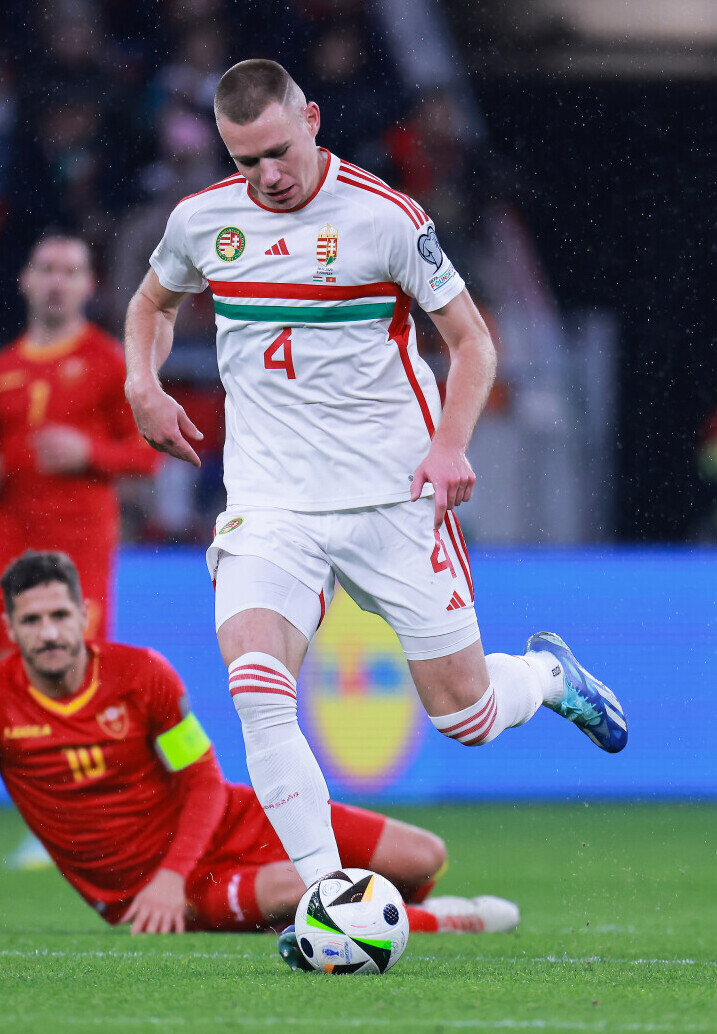
- Szalai with Hungary in 2023

Personal information
- Full name: Attila Árpád Szalai
- Date of birth: 20 January 1998 (age 28)
- Place of birth: Budapest, Hungary
- Height: 1.92 m (6 ft 4 in)
- Positions: Centre-back; left-back

Team information
- Current team: Pogoń Szczecin
- Number: 41

Youth career
- 2010–2012: Vasas
- 2012–2015: Rapid Wien

Senior career*
Years	Team	Apps	(Gls)
2015–2017	Rapid Wien II	43	(1)
2016	Rapid Wien	1	(0)
2017–2019	Mezőkövesd	45	(2)
2019–2021	Apollon Limassol	30	(2)
2021–2023	Fenerbahçe	84	(6)
2023–2026	TSG Hoffenheim	4	(0)
2024	→ SC Freiburg (loan)	3	(0)
2025	→ Standard Liège (loan)	5	(0)
2025	→ Kasımpaşa (loan)	15	(0)
2026	→ Pogoń Szczecin (loan)	14	(0)
2026–	Pogoń Szczecin	12	(1)

International career^{‡}
2014	Hungary U16	1	(0)
2014–2015	Hungary U17	5	(1)
2015–2017	Hungary U19	13	(0)
2017–2019	Hungary U21	18	(2)
2019–	Hungary	53	(2)
- * Club domestic league appearances and goals as of 15:31, 9 November 2026 (UTC) ‡ National team caps and goals as of 15 January 2026

Attila Árpád Szalai (born 20 January 1998) is a Hungarian professional footballer who plays as a centre-back or left-back for Ekstraklasa club Pogoń Szczecin and the Hungary national team.

== Club career ==
=== Early years ===
Szalai started playing football in Göd, then moved to youth team of Vác FC and later to the youth team of Vasas's academy,

=== Rapid Wien ===
In 2012, Austrian Bundesliga club Rapid Wien called Szalai up, and, after a week of trials, he was signed. First, he played in the club's youth and reserve teams, in the third division, and then he was promoted to the senior team. He made his debut as a professional at the age of 18 on 11 May 2016, starting in a 1–1 home tie against Altach. It was the only time Szalai played for the team in a professional match.

=== Mezőkövesd ===
On 1 July 2017, Szalai signed a three-year contract with Mezőkövesd. On 30 July 2017, he debuted in a 5–0 defeat against Ferencvárosi TC at the Ferencváros Stadion in the 2017–18 Nemzeti Bajnokság I season.

In his two seasons in the Hungarian top flight, he scored two goals in 45 matches for the club. On 21 July 2018, he scored the second goal in a 3–1 victory over Paksi FC in the 2018–19 Nemzeti Bajnokság I season at the Mezőkövesdi Városi Stadion. He scored his second goal in a 1–1 draw with Újpest FC at the Szusza Ferenc Stadion on 18 August 2018.

=== Apollon Limassol ===
On 1 July 2019, Szalai signed a four-year contract with Cypriot team Apollon Limassol. Szalai made his debut in Cyprus on as a half-time substitute in Apollon's UEFA Europa League qualifying match against Kauno Žalgiris, which his team won 2–0, on 11 July 2019. He then scored his first goal for his new team in the second leg of the tie on 18 July.

In November 2020, Turkish club Galatasaray inquired about signing Szalai.

=== Fenerbahçe ===
On 17 January 2021, Szalai signed a four-and-a-half-year contract with Fenerbahçe. On 25 January 2021, he made his debut for the club in a Süper Lig match against Kayserispor at the Ülker Arena, which Fenerbahçe won 3–0.

On 8 March 2021, Szalai scored his first goal in the Süper Lig against Konyaspor, at the Konya Büyükşehir Stadium, on the 29th matchday of the 2020–21 Süper Lig season; Fenerbahçe won 3–0.

On 28 February 2022, Szalai scored his first and only goal in the 2021–22 Süper Lig season against Kasımpaşa, at the Recep Tayyip Erdoğan Stadium in Istanbul. The match ended with a 2–1 victory for Fenerbahçe.

In the 2022–23 Süper Lig season, Szalai played 32 matches and scored two goals. He scored his first goal of the season in a 4–0 victory against Konyaspor on 25 February 2023. On 10 April 2023, he scored in a 2–1 away victory against Fatih Karagümrük at the Atatürk Olympic Stadium, Istanbul.

On 11 June 2023, Szalai won the 2023 Turkish Cup final with Fenerbahçe. In the final, his club beat İstanbul Başakşehir 2–0.

Although he was linked with a move to Union Berlin during the early summer of 2023, Szalai was instead purchased by fellow German club TSG Hoffenheim.

=== TSG Hoffenheim ===
On 24 July 2023, Szalai joined TSG Hoffenheim on a four-year contract deal, for a fee of €12.3 million.

On 19 August 2023, Szalai debuted against SC Freiburg in a 2–1 home defeat in the 2023–24 Bundesliga season. He also scored an own goal in the 39th minute. Consequently, he was substituted at half time and did not feature in the starting line-up for the club's subsequent match against 1. FC Heidenheim. On 2 September, Szalai played against VfL Wolfsburg, and was not substituted.

On 13 November 2024, he played in a friendly match against TSV Steinbach Haiger, after Pellegrino Matarazzo was sacked by Hoffenheim.

==== Loan to SC Freiburg ====
On 21 January 2024, Szalai was loaned to SC Freiburg for the remainder of the 2023–24 Bundesliga season. In an interview, published by Kicker, Klemens Hartenbach, the sports director of Freiburg, said that how Szalai signed the contract was weird. On 21 January 2024, Freiburg hosted Hoffenheim and Szalai was sitting among the substitutes for the entire match. After the match an agreement was reached between the two clubs and Szalai signed the loan contract wearing the Hoffenheim shirt. On 27 January 2024, he played his first match in a 3–1 defeat from SV Werder Bremen. He entered the pitch in the 71st minute as a substitute for Lukas Kübler. On 12 May 2024, it was announced that Freiburg would terminate his contract.

==== Loan to Standard Liège ====
On 12 January 2025, he was loaned to Belgian Pro League club Standard Liège. On 26 January 2025, he debuted in a 1–0 victory over F.C.V. Dender E.H. on the 23rd game week of the Belgian Pro League. He entered the pitch in the 84th minute as a substitute for Dennis Eckert. On the 26th game week, he was included in the starting lineup against Genk. Szalai was not substituted; however, the result was a 2–1 defeat against the leaders of the 2024–25 Belgian Pro League.

==== Loan to Kasımpaşa ====
On 11 July 2025, Szalai moved on a new loan to Kasımpaşa in Turkey. He debutted in a 2–1 defeat from Antalyaspor in the 2025–26 Süper Lig season on 9 August 2025.

=== Pogoń Szczecin ===
On 27 January 2026, Szalai joined Pogoń Szczecin in Poland on loan, without an option to buy. On 1 February 2026, he debuted in a 2–1 defeat from Motor Lublin. On 19 May 2026, Szalai said that “I’m satisfied with my spring season because I only missed two league games due to a minor injury; unfortunately, that also affected the national team matches in March.” At the end of the season, his coach, Thomas Thomasberg, said that “We definitely want to strengthen our defense. Attila is on loan with us; he’s a good player. We’ll see if we have the opportunity to keep him—that hasn’t been decided yet. If not, we’ll look for other options, but I won’t mention any specific names. Just as we did with Attila, we’ll seek out the best options for other players as well.”

On 9 July 2026, Szalai moved to Pogoń on a permanent basis, signing a three-year contract.

== International career ==
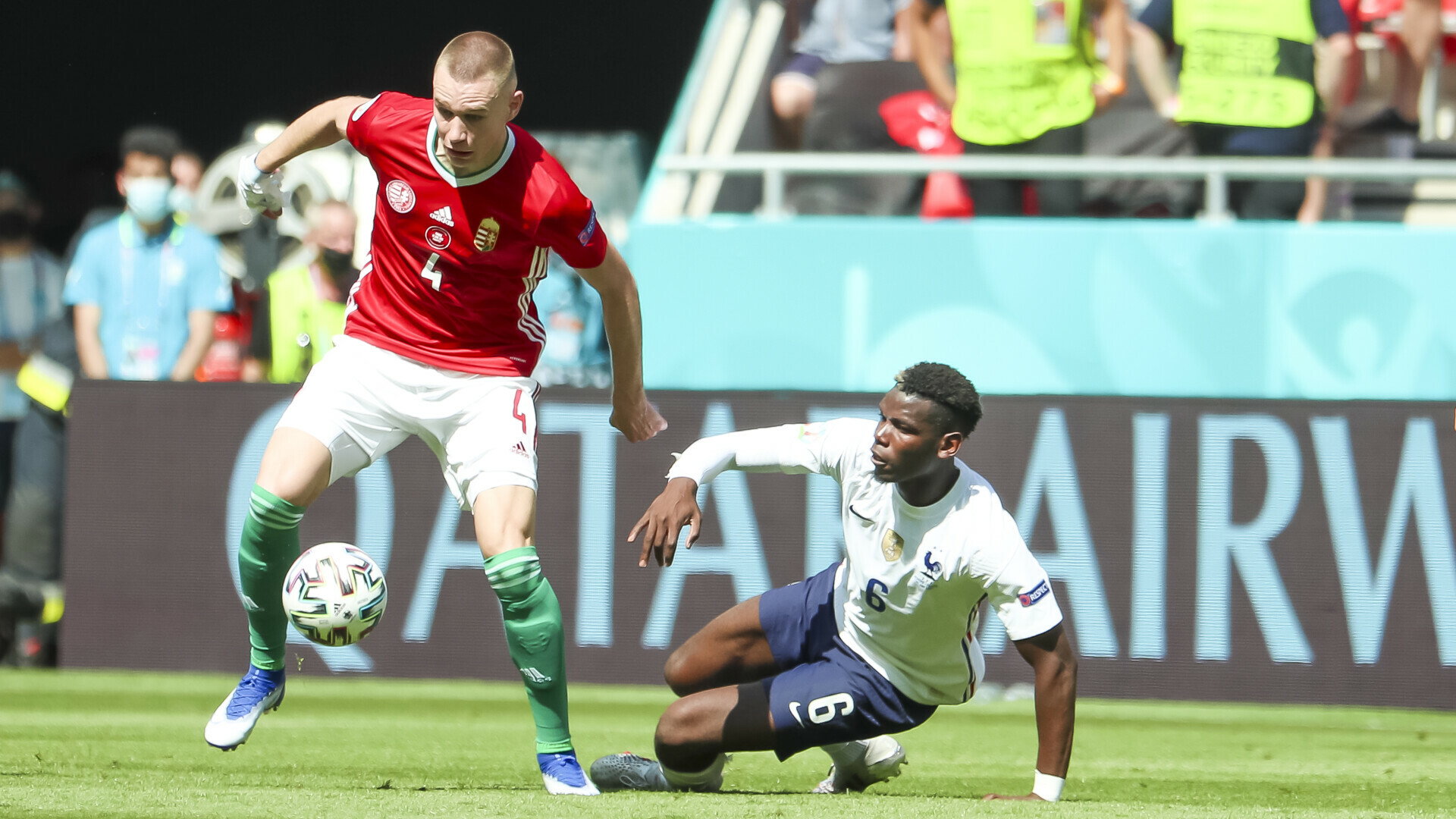
Szalai against Pogba of France, during Hungary's second group match of UEFA Euro 2020

Szalai made his senior debut for the Hungary national team on 15 November 2019, in a friendly against Uruguay. He was substituted for Botond Baráth in the 72nd minute.

On 1 June 2021, Szalai was included in the final 26-man squad to represent Hungary at the rescheduled UEFA Euro 2020 tournament. He played all three of the team's Group F matches as a left-sided centre back as the Magyars lost to Portugal and drew with both France and Germany.

On 17 November 2022, Szalai scored his first international goal against Luxembourg, in a friendly match played at the Stade de Luxembourg in Gasperich, Luxembourg City.

On 14 May 2024, Szalai was named in Hungary's squad for UEFA Euro 2024. He started the team's opening match of the tournament against Switzerland, playing 79 minutes of the 3–1 loss before being substituted for Márton Dárdai. After being an unused substitute in the second match against Germany, he appeared as a 74th-minute substitute for Dárdai in the 1–0 win over Scotland that ensured Hungary would finish third in Group A.

On 27 August 2024, Marco Rossi did not invite him to play against Germany in the 2024–25 UEFA Nations League match due on 7 September 2024. In March 2025, he was called up against Turkey in the 2024–25 UEFA Nations League promotion/relegation play-offs after almost a year of pause. However, he did not play in the first leg of the playoff in Istanbul. On 23 March 2025, he entered the pitch as a substitute for Márton Dárdai in the 60th minute against Turkey in the 2024–25 UEFA Nations League promotion/relegation play-offs at Puskás Aréna.

On 14 October 2025, he scored his second goal for the national team in a 2–2 draw against Portugal in the 2026 FIFA World Cup qualification group match at the Estádio José Alvalade, Lisbon, Portugal. He scored the first goal of the match in the 8th minute.

In 2026, he was called up against the friendly ties with Slovenia and Greece. However, he left the camp due to injuries.

== Personal life ==
Szalai is the third most popular sportsperson in Hungary, based on followers on Instagram. In an interview with Nemzeti Sport, his father, also named Attila Szalai, said that in a transfer the most important factor is not the money, but being happy with the move. On 27 December 2022, he played an important role before the match against Hatayspor by holding a picture of a 6-year-old boy who suffers from Leukemia. In this way, Mustafa Roni Güclü could 'participate' in the match. He donated blood to the victims of the 2023 Turkey–Syria earthquake along with other footballers of Fenerbahçe. His nickname is Sancho (in Hungarian: Szancsó). He can speak fluently in Turkish.

== Career statistics ==
=== Club ===
As of match played 7 November 2026

Appearances and goals by club, season and competition
Club	Season	League			National cup (Note: Includes Magyar Kupa, Cypriot Cup, Turkish Cup, DFB-Pokal, Polish Cup)		Continental		Total	
Club	Season	Division	Apps	Goals	Apps	Goals	Apps	Goals	Apps	Goals
Rapid Wien	2015–16	Austrian Bundesliga	1	0	0	0	—		1	0
Rapid Wien II	2015–16	Regionalliga Ost	20	1	0	0	—		20	1
Rapid Wien II	2016–17	Regionalliga Ost	23	0	0	0	—		23	0
Rapid Wien II	Total		43	1	0	0	—		43	1
Mezőkövesd	2017–18	Nemzeti Bajnokság I	20	0	2	0	—		22	0
Mezőkövesd	2018–19	Nemzeti Bajnokság I	25	2	5	0	—		30	2
Mezőkövesd	Total		45	2	7	0	—		52	2
Apollon Limassol	2019–20	Cypriot First Division	14	0	3	0	7 (Note: Appearances in UEFA Europa League)	2	24	2
Apollon Limassol	2020–21	Cypriot First Division	16	2	0	0	3	1	19	3
Apollon Limassol	Total		30	2	3	0	10	3	43	5
Fenerbahçe	2020–21	Süper Lig	21	3	1	0	—		22	3
Fenerbahçe	2021–22	Süper Lig	31	1	2	0	10 (Note: Eight appearances in UEFA Europa League, two appearances in UEFA Europa Conference League)	0	43	1
Fenerbahçe	2022–23	Süper Lig	32	2	6	0	14 (Note: Two appearances and one goal in UEFA Champions League, twelve appearances in UEFA Europa League)	1	52	3
Fenerbahçe	Total		84	6	9	0	24	1	117	7
TSG Hoffenheim	2023–24	Bundesliga	4	0	1	0	—		5	0
TSG Hoffenheim	2024–25	Bundesliga	0	0	0	0	—		0	0
TSG Hoffenheim	Total		4	0	1	0	—		5	0
SC Freiburg (loan)	2023–24	Bundesliga	3	0	—		—		3	0
Standard Liège (loan)	2024–25	Belgian Pro League	5	0	—		—		5	0
Kasımpaşa (loan)	2025–26	Süper Lig	15	0	0	0	—		15	0
Pogoń Szczecin (loan)	2025–26	Ekstraklasa	14	0	—		—		14	0
Pogoń Szczecin	2026–27	Ekstraklasa	12	1	1	0	—		13	1
Pogoń Szczecin	Pogoń Szczecin total		26	1	1	0	—		27	1
Career total			253	12	21	0	34	4	308	16

=== International ===
As of match played 16 November 2025

Appearances and goals by national team and year
National team	Year	Apps	Goals
Hungary	2019	1	0
Hungary	2020	7	0
Hungary	2021	15	0
Hungary	2022	8	1
Hungary	2023	10	0
Hungary	2024	5	0
Hungary	2025	7	1
Total		53	2

As of match played 14 October 2025
Scores and results list Hungary's goal tally first, score column indicates score after each Szalai goal.

List of international goals scored by Attila Szalai
No.	Date	Venue	Cap	Opponent	Score	Result	Competition
1	17 November 2022	Stade de Luxembourg, Luxembourg City, Luxembourg	30	Luxembourg	1–1	2–2	Friendly
2	14 October 2025	Estádio José Alvalade, Lisbon, Portugal	51	Portugal	1–0	2–2	2026 FIFA World Cup qualification

== Honours ==
Fenerbahçe

- Turkish Cup: 2022–23
