= Said Gafurov =

Russian scholar and economist

- Саид Гафуров
- Born: 19 April 1967 (age 59); Moscow, USSR

Academic background
- Education: Moscow State University
- Thesis: (1997)
- Doctoral advisor: Alexander Buzgalin
- Influences: Karl Marx, Alexander Buzgalin, John Keynes, Bertrand Russell

Academic work
- Discipline: Political economy; Probability; Securities research; International Economics; Orientalism; Islamic studies; Philosophy
- School or tradition: Development economics; Marxist economics; Positivist economics; New Keynesian economics, Post-Keynesian economics
- Notable ideas: Political economy; Development economics; Ergodic Theory; Securities research; Orientalism; Islamic studies

Said Zakirovich Gafurov (born 1967) is a Russian scholar, Marxian economist, orientalist, bureaucrat, and opera critic. After working in the government in his early career now is an associate professor at Moscow State Linguistic University. His journalism centers on trade unionist activities and electoral politics. He also hosts the web shows Point of view: Orient, Point of view: Economy, and Point of view: Behind the Ocean on Pravda.

== Early life ==
Gafurov was born into a Gorky Tatar (Mishar) family in 1967. His father, Zakerya Shagizanovich, was a revolutionary and his mother, Anisa Sofovna Khusainova, was an artist. He received his bachelor's degree in Asian and African Studies (1992) and his PhD in economics under Alexander Buzgalin (1997) from Moscow State University. Buzgalin considered him one of his best students.

== Career ==
Gafurov worked as the Director of the Department of Finance, Credit, Insurance, and Foreign Trade within the Ministry of State Property under Prime Minister Yevgeniy Primakov. He later worked as a Counselor in the Russian Inter-Budget Relations office in the Ministry of Regional Development. In 2011, he assumed the role of Deputy Chief Editor for economic issues for the monthly journal VVP (Gross Domestic Product), a publication known for its active support of Vladimir Putin. Under Gafurov's guidance, VVP became one of the most significant sources of neo-Keynesian, Marxist, and anti-neo-liberal economic policy articles in Russia. He has also served as a consultant for various government ministries in issues of foreign economic relations. Since Putin's first term, Gafurov has elaborated the concept of Russian Bonapartism and the attempts by the bourgeoisie for Liberal Revenge. He has also had regular speaking appearances at international congresses, where he stresses the need for state-funded political-economic research.

== Political thought ==
Gafurov is a Russian Marxist within Alexander Buzgalin's school of thought, though his beliefs subscribe more closely to positivism than Buzgalin's dialectical metaphysical beliefs. He rejects the concepts of the Asiatic mode of production and the USSR's state capitalism, which he based on analysis of the role of credit relations in USSR and other countries with a state capitalist system. He supports the reconciliation of Stalinism, Trotskyism, and Maoism as he believes the differences have only historical significance. He also supports the quantitative theory of imperialism, holding that stronger imperialism is better than weaker imperialism, a view that contradicts Leninist defeatism. Gafurov believes this position allows for tactical alliances with weaker imperialist approaches such as Russian and Iranian imperialism, though he rejects Chinese imperialism. Despite this, he supports China in all South China Sea conflicts except for the conflict with Vietnam over the Paracel Islands.

Gafurov's anti-crisis beliefs are rooted in Keynesian economics. Based on the financial crises of 1998-1999, 2008-2009, and 2014-2016, Gafurov elaborated on the concepts of mismatch (pассогласование) and imbalance (pазбалансировка) of credit-monetary and fiscal-budgetary policies as the main cause of anti-crisis policy's ineffectiveness. The Central Bank of Russia and the Ministry of Finance both rejected his hypotheses on grounds of the absence of said mismatch. With epistemological data, Gafurov is considered a nominalist. He views ethics as a narrative, "positive rather than normative" as "[e]thics and behavior are subject to the same laws." In the late 1990s, Gafurov wrote several articles for the journal Рынок ценных бумаг (Securities market), building on the Ergodic approach to equity research. He wrote that statistical methods could be used only when the time series of securities' prices are subject to ergodicity principles. The practical significance of Gafurov's thereom corollary, which he calls lemma, is based on the Bayesian approach. In 2013, Gafurov began working with Buzgalin on international political-economic network reorganization.

Gafurov disapproves of NATO, neocolonialism, and neo-racism and is critical of the European Union's "parasitic capitalist policies" in Africa and Europe, claiming that "capital is indifferent to everything except its profit. It needs to capture new markets and destroy their production." He is a leader of the Russian Social Forum movement and has participated in writing programs documenting the movement in defense of labour. In 2017, he was a key organizer of the World Festival of Youth and Students in Sochi, Russia and made at least 11 speeches during the festival.

=== Conflict-specific opinions ===
Gafurov has published opinion pieces about a number of conflicts throughout his career. In 2011, he wrote in support of Laurent Gbagbo following the 2010 Ivorian presidential election, when both Gbagbo and opponent Alassane Ouattara took an oath of office, leading to the 2010–2011 Ivorian crisis. Gafurov was among the most prominent supporters of President Gaddafi during the First Libyan Civil War in 2011 due to his perception that the war was a "tribal reaction" to Gaddafi's attempts to modernise Libya; the fact that insurgents were headed by former Minister of Justice Mustafa Abdul Jalil; and the economic interests of Russia's oil and gas sector. In 2016, Gafurov spoke at the POLISARIO Congresses in Algeria. The same year, he suggested that to settle the Syrian crisis, the Russian Foreign Policy should garner support from Catholic American lobbyists. He has been deputy chairman of the Russian Committee for Solidarity with Peoples of Libya and Syria since its founding. He defended the Syrian government during the Siege of Daraa, believing it to be a conflict between the Druzites and Bedouin.

In February 2014, following the Revolution of Dignity in Ukraine, Gafurov outlined what he believed should be the principles of Ukraine: removal of the "fascist self-proclaimed government" in Kyiv, its "IMF-inspired economic program," and Crimean annexation by Russia; and federalisation of Ukraine so its regions could self-determine whether they wanted to integrate into Europe, join a free-trade zone with the Eurasian Customs Union, or declare independence from both. He later changed his position on Crimea based on supposed damage done to Ukraine's economy following the Revolution of Dignity and the Crimean people's refusal to return to Ukraine. In February 2017, he criticised the United States for calling for the return of Crimea to Ukraine, promising that he would personally campaign to do so once the United States returned Texas, California, New Mexico, and Arizona to Mexico. His comments led some to suspect him of secretly organising the transfer of refugees, mainly members of the Communist Party of Ukraine, Borotba and other leftist organizations, who were persecuted and tortured during the Revolution of Dignity, to Russia.

In 2016, he hypothesized that any election "from the United States to the DPRK, from India to Russia, from Switzerland to the People's China, from Germany to Syria," the number of illegal, "thrown in" votes is consistently between 5% and 10% of votes for one or two candidates. This is based on the mathematical expectation of this figure in the presence of a sufficiently large number of polling stations and a large number of elections. This hypothesis is used to calculate the budgets of election campaigns in Russia. Gafurov accused the United States of hypocrisy over nuclear non-proliferation, claiming they were the only nation to ever drop atomic bombs on cities. In October 2020, he claimed internationalism is the only way to achieve a ceasefire between Armenia and Azerbaijan, a view met with criticism from both Armenian and Azerbaijani nationalists. Following Russian involvement in the Syrian civil war, Gafurov began speaking out against Russian propaganda; the Kremlin has not challenged his views.

Gafurov opposes the concept of intellectual property, claiming that it damages the common good and that most modern culture is sponsored by the state and philanthropy anyway. He was among the first Russian scholars to publish his PhD dissertation on the internet as early as 1996; this led to his involvement in some Russian Dissernet scandals as a source of violated copyright. Gafurov has been accused of plagiarising short news articles from Greek, Indian, and Bengali radical Marxist sources several times. He has also been criticised for "dilettantism" in his psychological and philosophical works, in part due to his application of mathematical concepts not common in these fields. In general, Gafurov approaches psychology from an experimental and analytical standpoint and seeks to identify hidden rationality in irrationality.

== Personal life ==
Gafurov is married to Darya Mitina (they met in 2006), Secretary of the United Communist Party and one of the founder of the Russian Communist Youth League. He is largely believed to be the inspiration for the protagonist in Mitina's short stories The highest level of relations. They have two sons.

Gafurov is fluent in Arabic. In 2012, he began writing as an opera critic for Pravda and focuses mainly on the social side, rather than the musical side. In his study of aesthetics, he differentiates between "absence of taste" and "bad taste" with comparisons to the differences in pop music, which he denies holds any aesthetic values, and classical music. He wrote that absence of taste is to be "more likely to listen to popular singers than good symphonic orchestra".

== Writing and selected works ==
Gafurov uses a number of pen names, including Elbrus Byudzhetnikov (Эльбрус Бюджетников), Sofya Antiokhiyskaya (Софья Антиохийская), and Lucretia and Brunhilda Rabinowitz (Лукреция и Брунгильда Рабиновитц). Gafurov has written monographs for various Russian economic ministries, including The Intergovernmental Commissions and the modernization of the Russian economy (2011), The initiative 'Partnership for Modernization' and the Russian national interests (2013), and The WTO mechanisms and non-discriminatory operations of Russian oil and gas companies in the European Energy markets (2014). Among the topics Gafurov writes about are economics, security markets in Arabic countries, and what he considered "problems" in Isma'ilism, Druzism, Alawism, Shīʿism, and Sunnism. He believes the difference between Muslim sects is political more than anything and that sect-specific madhhabs made this more concrete.

- 1996: The experience of comparative analysis of privatization and the formation of the corporate securities market in developing and post-socialist countries (Опыт сравнительного анализа приватизации и формирования рынка корпоративных ценных бумаг в развивающихся и пост-социалистических странах)
- 2011: The Intergovernmental Commissions and the Modernization of the Russian economy (Межправительственные комиссии и модернизация российской экономики)
- 2013: The initiative "Partnership for Modernization" and the Russian national interests (Инициатива "Партнерство для модернизации)
- 2013: The philosophy of Equity research (Философия фондового анализа)
- 2014: The WTO mechanisms and non-discriminatory operations of Russian oil and gas companies in the European Energy markets (Механизмы ВТО и недискриминационный режим работы российских нефтегазовых компаний на европейском рынке)
- 2019: The Cross, the crescent and the Arab nation: ideological currents in the Middle East (Крест, полумесяц и арабская нация : идейные течения на Ближнем Востоке) - ISBN 978-5-4475-9852-5
- 2020: Combat ecology: How Greenpeace, WWF and other international environmental organizations are undermining Russia's development (Боевая экология. Как Greenpeace, WWF и другие международные экологические организации подрывают развитие России) - ISBN 978-5-4461-1723-9
- 2021: Look into the future and get rich! Philosophy, ethics and algebra of stock analysis (Заглянуть в будущее и разбогатеть! Философия, этика и алгебра фондового анализа Заглянуть в будущее и разбогатеть! Философия, этика и алгебра фондового анализа) - ISBN 978-5-4499-0262-7
- 2023: "Pledge of Victory: Molotov-Ribbentrop Pact: An Objective Approach" ("Залог Победы : договор Молотова-Риббентропа : объективный подход") - ISBN 978-5-4499-3716-2 https://www.directmedia.ru/book-701225-zalog-pobedyi-dogovor-molotova-ribbentropa/?srsltid=AfmBOopKGqIWHUFVkA2pIfUYO7Y77s57jUJISkplErJeREYe5Hw2lYcY
- 2025: "Edward Said's Orientalism and Its Influence on Views on the Modern East". – Moscow: Direct-Media, 2025. ISBN 978-5-4499-5213-4 https://www.directmedia.ru/book-724292-aktualnyie-voprosyi-vostokovedeniya/

In 2026, S. Gafurov's textbook for the master's program, "Methodology of Political Economy Analysis of World Regions," was published. Gafurov draws on the practice of international regional studies, rather than seeking universal, abstract laws (as is sometimes done in theoretical political economy). His goal is not to create a unified theory, but to provide tools for building effective predictive models. He believes that by understanding the internal logic of the development of specific countries and regions, one can more accurately predict their actions: how they will respond to sanctions, where investments will flow, whether there is potential for internal instability, and what vectors their foreign policy will choose.
