= Darya Mitina =

Russian politician, historian, and cinema critic

Darya Mitina Member of Parliament
- Дарья Митина
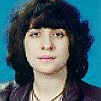

Secretary of the Central Committee of the United Communist Party
- Incumbent
- Assumed office 6 February 2010
- Preceded by: Position established

First Secretary of the Central Committee of the Russian Young Communist League (RKSM)
- Incumbent
- Assumed office 23 January 2001
- Preceded by: Aleksey Pokatayev

Member of the State Duma
- In office 1995–1999

Personal details
- Born: Darya Alexandrovna Mitina; 14 August 1973 (age 53) Moscow, Russian SFSR, Soviet Union
- Party: United Communist Party
- Spouse: Said Gafurov
- Education: Moscow State University (1995)
- Website: Official website

Darya (Note: Sometimes transcribed to English as Daria) Alexandrovna (Note: Sometimes transcribed to English as Aleksandrovna) Mitina (Russian: Да́рья Алекса́ндровна Ми́тина; born 14 August 1973) is a Russian leftist politician, historian, and cinema critic.

She graduated as a historian and ethnologist from the Faculty of History of the Moscow State University in 1995. She studied there as a graduate student, but did not defend her PhD dissertation.

== Relationships ==
Her mother, Natalia Mitina, was a known Soviet cinema scenario writer, and her father, Kasem Iskander Ibrahim Mohammed Yusufzai, was the founder of an Afghanistan national TV network. Her grandfather, Mohammed Yusuf, was the Prime Minister of Afghanistan from 1963 to 1965. Her another grandfather worked at the Research Institute of Carriage Construction. Her grandmother was born in Bakhmut. Her grandmother studied at the MSU Faculty of Economics. Her great-grandmother Rozaliya Kamenskaya (Russian: Розалия Каменская) was awarded the medal "For the Defence of Moscow".

Her childhood friend was Sergei Bodrov Jr.

She is married to Said Gafurov. Her first husband was Ukrainian. They met at Moscow State University at Vaziulin’s seminar.

Richard Kosolapov provided a recommendation for her to join the CPRF.

== Political activity ==
In 1991 she entered Labour Russia.

Since 2014 she has been a Secretary responsible for International affairs of the Party and member of the Political commission of the United Communist Party (Russia).

She was a deputy of the State Duma for the second convocation (1995-1999). During the 2016 State Duma elections she was a candidate from the Communist Party Communists of Russia at the Cheryomushkinsky election district but did not succeed.

She is the First Secretary of the Central Committee of the Russian Communist Youth League (Komsomol), and she was one of its founders in 1993.

In May–August 2014 Mitina was the Representative of the Ministry of Foreign Affairs of the Donetsk People's Republic in Moscow. That same year, she appeared on the cover of Communist magazine.

She believes that World War III is already underway. She is against equality and advocates for social justice. She is a supporter of Trotsky.

She was awarded the medal "80 Years of Victory over Japan"

== Critical perception ==
As noted in the material published on the World Socialist Web Site on September 29, 2018: "Mitina is a Stalinist, for whom the late dictator is a man who has no equal in history. Twice a year she visits his grave to lay flowers. She travels the world as an informal political agent of Vladimir Putin's government".

As a politician, Darya Mitina was criticized by Viktor Tyulkin, as a film critic by Dmitry Karavaev (ru).
