= Marx's method =

Method of analysis and presentation

Various Marxist authors have focused on Marx's method of analysis and presentation (historical materialist and logical-dialectical) as key factors both in understanding the range and incisiveness of Karl Marx's writing in general, his critique of political economy, as well as Grundrisse and Das Kapital in particular. One of the clearest and most instructive examples of this is his discussion of the value-form, which acts as a primary guide or key to understanding the logical argument as it develops throughout the volumes of Das Kapital.

== Overview ==
Marx himself presents a simplified explanation in the Appendix to the first German edition of Das Kapital published in English translation in Capital & Class. The need for this appendix was suggested by Engels and there is an exchange of correspondence concerning its purpose and form.

The two principal components of Marxist science are the dialectical method of logical deduction and genetic synthesis and its application to the evolution of real social history. While in each of these areas considered separately there are at least a number of scholarly works, there are few examples of substantial exegesis and fewer still successful applications of Marxian method to the fundamental obstacles to class consciousness today. This is reflected both at the general level of lack of understanding of the social nature of technological change embodied in Marx's theory of the value-form, reflected in widespread ignorance of the detail of the "rational kernel" of Hegel's dialectic whose the principal 'forms of being' Marx used to structure the whole of the work on Capital. His analytical evolution of the relation between subjective and objective development and their qualitative and quantitatively measured forms and functions which make up the logical skeleton in his presentation are almost universally ignored. Compare Hegel's Logic for instance with Marx the value-form.

More than any other twentieth century Marxist, Lenin self-consciously assimilated the fundamentals of this methodological approach (to the careful study of which he returned at the most critical political moments and set about the task of applying it to the "burning questions of our movement". His appreciation of the importance of the knowledge of real social movements is apparent from his studies: The development of Capitalism in Russia and his Notebooks on Imperialism.

Lukacs' revolutionary career is made more problematic by his intellectual capitulation to the pressures of Stalinism. The essays from his period of active revolutionary leadership however are of unparalleled importance for their reassertion of Hegel's contribution to Marxism. In addition his critical review of Bukharin published as Technology & Social Relations remains of seminal importance as one of the few direct attempts to deal with the problem of the methodological degeneration of communist theory on this question utilising an adequate level of theoretical and historical understanding.

Isaak Rubin's Essays shared this appreciation of the weakness of communist theory (as did the work of Korsch and Jakubowski) but with the exceptions of Henryk Grossman's work at the Frankfurt Institute for Social Research, and Evgeny Preobrazhensky's New Economics, Rubin was in this period almost alone in articulating the central methodological content embodied in Marx's theoretical concepts. Roman Rosdolsky's valuable study The Making of Marx's 'Capital', which re-emphasises the importance of use-value in Marx's two-fold analysis, was a result of his discovery of one of the rare copies of Grundrisse Marx's previously unpublished rough draft for Capital.

Whereas Lenin had come to his understanding of the importance of Hegel's Logic by extensive study, Grossman's emphasis grew out of the need to re-articulate the structural method of Capital in dealing with imperialism at the necessary level of theory. Rosdolsky was however able to read Marx directly asserting his enormous debt to Hegel and exploring out-loud the methodological problems of the relation between the investigation and presentation of his 'critique'.

Lukács in 1930 had a similar experience in his reading of the then recently deciphered Economic and Philosophic Manuscripts of 1844 on which he subsequently commented: "the overwhelming effect produced in me by Marx's statement that objectivity was the primary material attribute of all things and relations... that objectification is a natural means by which man masters the world and as such can be either a positive or a negative fact... it became clear to us that even the best and most capable Marxists, like Plekhanov and Mehring, had not had a sufficiently profound grasp of the universal nature of Marxism. They failed, therefore, to understand that Marx confronts us with the necessity of erecting a systematic aesthetics on the foundations of dialectical materialism." It was in this period that Lukacs began his twin study of The Young Hegel and The Destruction of Reason on the one hand looking at the contribution Hegel made to the rational scientific basis of dialectical materialism and on the other how in a direct reaction to the development of Marxism the irrationalist elements of Hegel's thought were promoted and the revolutionary critical element dismembered in the process of the degeneration of bourgeois philosophy.

The immediate post-war period produced little that was Marxist by these criteria, with perhaps the sole exception of Paul Mattick's essays which defended the orthodox theoretical Marxism, particularly on the issue of Marx's theory of crisis, against revisionists such as Paul Sweezy. Mattick's essay "Technology and the Mixed Economy" (1966) was a rare articulation of the limitations and social origin of the drive for labour productivity. Mattick drew substantially on Grossman's 1929 study The law of accumulation and the breakdown of capitalism defending its analysis against Sweezy 1942] and other anti-Marxists who sought to eradicate the connection between capitalist accumulation and the theory of crises. Mattick argued that despite the appearance of the post-war boom capitalism would continue to retard the development of productive forces and that the limits to capital accumulation would reassert themselves. Until Grossman's work becomes fully available in English, Mattick's Economic Crisis and Crisis Theory remains the most readily available articulation of the necessity of revolutionary theory for today's conditions. The 1970s saw a resurgence of Marxist studies which sought to assimilate the theoretical gains which had been lost to working class politics in the middle decades of the twentieth century.

Drawing on these and other forgotten works in the Marxist tradition and a renewed study of the methodologically explicit drafts and early writings and correspondence of Marx, a tendency began to emerge which struggled to return theoretically to an authentic "Marx's Marxism" and come to terms with the outstanding problems facing Marxist critique of capitalist society in the second half of the twentieth century. Unfortunately the political hiatus caused by the largely unexpected collapse of the Soviet Union resulted in a widespread fragmentation and demoralisation even amongst those Marxist writers who were critical of the Stalinist state formations.

The nature of the Soviet Union, the political tenacity and character of Stalinism itself, an explanation of the political hold of and contemporary forms of Reformism in the working class and the restatement of the fundamentals of the Marxist struggle against the state, and the bourgeois ideological weapons of nationalism, imperialism and the oppression of nations and nationalities, racial and women's oppression and the economic role of the family under capitalism. This tendency has yet to re-articulate Marx's critique of ideological power of the politics of productivity theoretically in challenging the revisionist acceptance of technological mystification.

== Readings on Marx's method ==
- Henryk Grossman focussed considerable effort in often difficult circumstances in pursuing fundamental research into Marx’s method. His studies resulted amongst others in his masterwork: The Law of Accumulation and the breakdown of the Capitalist System: Being also a theory of crises Pluto 1992.
- Evald Ilyenkov The Dialectics of the Abstract and the Concrete in Marx's Capital Progress Moscow 1982
- Andrey Maidansky "The Dialectical Logic of Evald llyenkov and Western European Marxism"
- Franz Jakubowski in his Ideology and Superstructure in Historical Materialism Pluto 1990
- Karl Korsch Three Essays on Marxism Pluto 1971 and Marxism and Philosophy Monthly Review 1970
- György Lukács in "What is Orthodox Marxism?", defined orthodoxy as the fidelity to the "Marxist method"
- Karl Marx 'The Value-Form' Appendix to the 1st German edition of Capital, Volume 1, 1867
- Geoffrey Pilling Marx’s Capital: Philosophy and political economy RKP 1980
- Roman Rosdolsky particularly in The Making of Marx's Capital Pluto 1980
- Isaak Illich Rubin Essays on Marx’s Theory of Value Black & Red 1972
- Jindřich Zelený The Logic of Marx Blackwell 1980
- Victor Alekseyevich Vaziulin The Logic of K. Marx's "Capital" 1968
- Victor Alekseyevich Vaziulin The Making of K. Marx's Scientific Research Method 1975
