= Italians of Odesa =

Historical national minority in Odesa

Italiani di Odessa (Italian); Італійці з Одеси (Ukrainian); Итальянцы из Одессы (Russian)
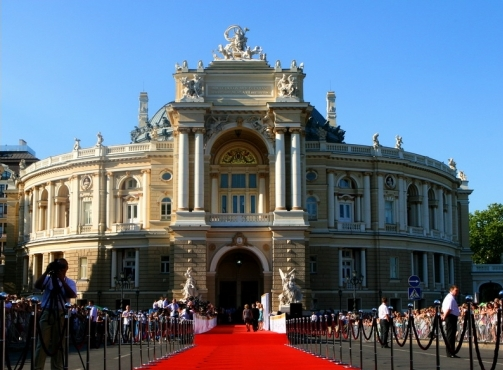
- The Italian baroque facade of the Odesa Opera and Ballet Theater. It was started with the important contribution of the Italians of Odesa

Total population
- 0

Regions with significant populations
- Odesa

Languages
- Italian and Italian dialects; Ukrainian; Russian

Religion
- Catholic, Eastern Orthodoxy

Related ethnic groups
- Other Italians, especially Italians of Crimea

The Italians of Odesa, part of the Italian diaspora, were an ethnic minority that once resided in Odesa, a city in southern Ukraine on the Black Sea. They are mentioned for the first time in documents of the 13th century. The influx of Italians into southern Ukraine grew particularly with the foundation of Odesa, which took place in 1794. In 1797 there were about 800 Italians in Odesa, equal to 10% of the total population. For more than a century the Italians of Odesa greatly influenced the culture, art, industry, society, architecture, politics and economy of the city. Among the works created by the Italians of Odesa there were the Potemkin Stairs and the Odesa Opera and Ballet Theater. At the beginning of the 19th century the Italian language became the second official language in Odesa, after Russian.

Until the 1870s, Odesa's Italian population grew steadily. From the following decade this growth stopped, and the decline of the Italian community in Odesa began. The reason was mainly one, namely the gradual integration into the Slavic population of Odesa, i.e. Russians and Ukrainians. Surnames began to be Russianized and Ukrainianized. The revolution of 1917 sent many of them to Italy, or to other cities in Europe. In Soviet times, only a few dozen Italians remained in Odesa, most of whom no longer knew their own language. Over time they merged with the local population, losing the ethnic connotations of origin. They disappeared completely by World War II.

== History ==
Italians of Odesa are mentioned for the first time in documents of the 13th century, when on the territory of the future Odesa, a city in southern Ukraine on the Black Sea, the anchorage of the Genoese commercial ships was placed, which was called "Ginestra", perhaps from name of the broom plant, very common in the steppes of the Black Sea.

In 1789, during the Russo-Turkish War, Giuseppe De Ribas, an officer in the service of the Russian prince Grigory Potemkin, with his troops conquered the village of Khadjibey, inhabited by Tatars. In this place, Giuseppe De Ribas, having understood the importance of the presence of a new port in Ukraine on the Black Sea, founded Odesa in 1794 with the approval of the Russian Empress Catherine the Great. In Russia, during the winter, the ice made the ports located in the north unusable. With the founding of Odesa, which was located in the south of the Russian Empire, the country had a port that operated year-round.

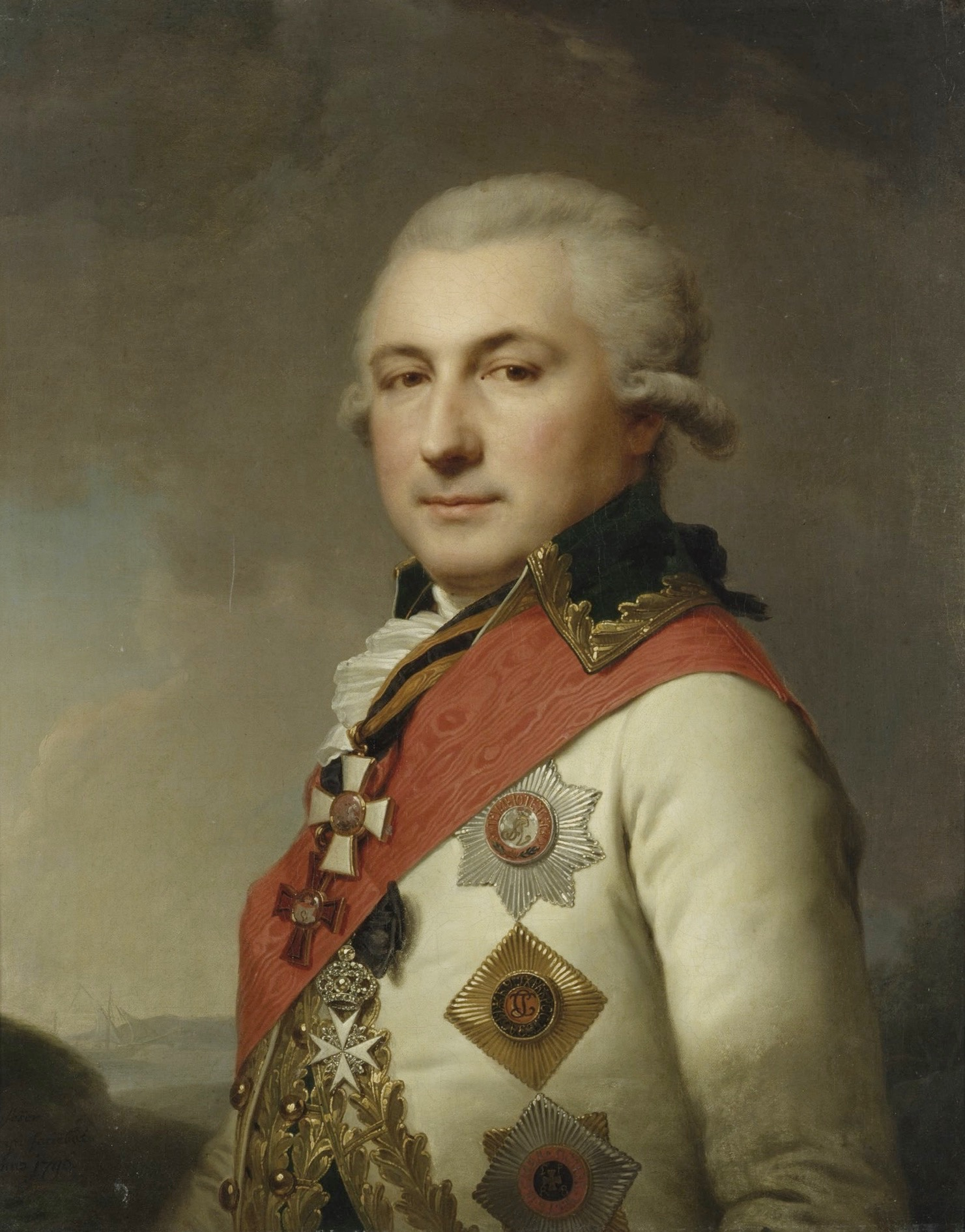
Portrait of Giuseppe De Ribas by Johann Baptist von Lampi the Elder (1796), Hermitage Museum

The influx of Italians in southern Ukraine grew particularly with the foundation of Odesa, which took place in 1794. All this was facilitated by the fact that at the helm of the newly founded capital of the Black Sea basin, there was a Neapolitan of Spanish origin, Giuseppe De Ribas, in office until 1797. Once Odesa was founded, there was a need to populate it with new inhabitants, among whom there were many Italians, given the place of origin of Giuseppe De Ribas.

Giuseppe De Ribas described Odesa in this way:

Odesa is predominantly Italian. The sky, the sun, the architecture of the buildings, the painting in the churches, the names of the streets - "strade" and "stradelli", the first ships from Naples and Messina, the first shopkeepers, the first grocery stores, the first wine cellars, pasta, the first tomatoes and the first operas were the reflection and echo of blessed Italy. It is no coincidence that Alexander Pushkin (the great Russian poet) who loved and understood all beautiful things, called the Odessites - the children of happy Ausonia.

— Giuseppe De Ribas

In 1797 there were about 800 Italians in Odesa, equal to 10% of the total population: they were mostly traders and of Neapolitan, Genoese and Livorno sailors, who were later joined by artists, technicians, artisans, pharmacists and teachers. From 1798 the consuls of Naples, Sardinia and Corsica were present in Odesa. Subsequently the consulate of Sardinia was transformed into an Italian consulate. The first Odesa policeman, who was hired in 1794, was Italian. Italians actively participated in local politics in Odesa, so much so that Italians were already present in the municipal council in office since 1797. Trade with Italy started from the ports of Naples, Genoa and Venice. From these ports, and due to Italian trading companies, tomatoes, which until then were unknown, were imported to Odesa for the first time.

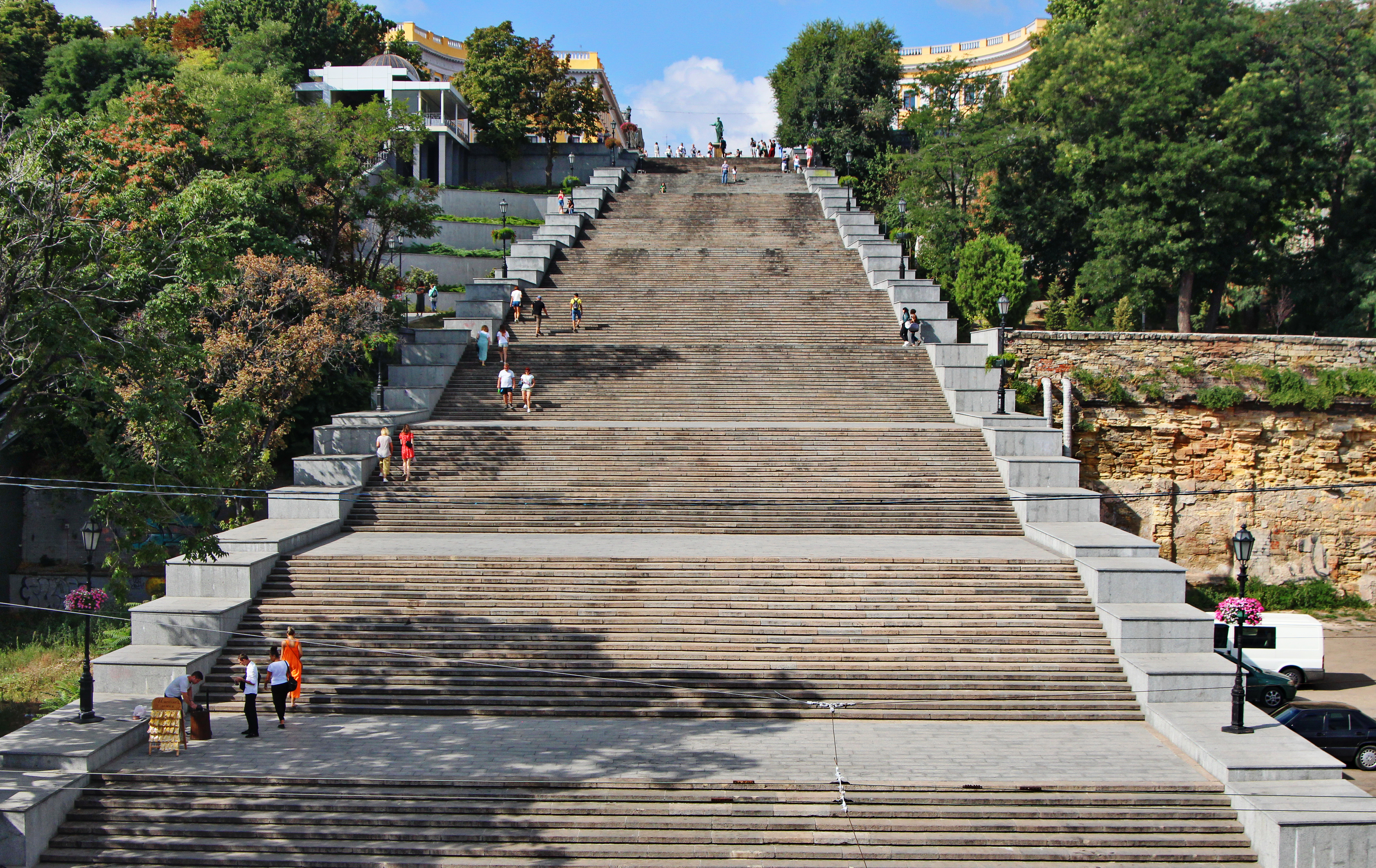
Potemkin Stairs, designed in 1837 by Italian architect Francesco Boffo and St. Petersburg architect Avraam Melnikov

In Odesa the Italians also owned bakeries, pasta and biscuit factories, and later in the period 1794-1802, the first Italian-owned trading companies arose. Later Italians became owners of restaurants, cafes, pastry shops, casinos and hotels. Some of them operated until the beginning of the 20th century and were often highly prestigious activities that animated the social life of Odesa. For example, the 'Casino del Commerce' was the only coffee shop in the city at the end of the 1830s and the luxurious Fanconi café-pastry shop, founded in Odesa in the 1870s, gained enormous prestige. In the so-called "Italian casinos" you could listen to music, dance and play dominoes. The main Italian trading houses with a turnover of four million rubles were the Cortazzi, Ralli families, and with a turnover of two million rubles, the Porro family. Among the works created by the Italians of Odesa there were also the Potemkin Stairs.

At the beginning of the 19th century the Italian community began to play an important role in the public and commercial life of the city. The Italian language began to spread and over time entered the sphere of communications of businessmen: bills of exchange, cheques, contracts, business correspondence, accounting – everything was written in Italian. Furthermore, the need to know foreign languages – including Italian – led to the teaching of Russian, Greek and Italian in the first Odesa school founded in 1800. At the beginning of the 19th century the Italian language became the second official language in Odesa, after Russian. Some signs showing the names of the streets of Odesa were written in Italian. The signs of institutions and shops, road signs, passports, price lists bore writings in both Russian and Italian. The first Italian-Russian dictionary was written in Odesa by the Italian Domenico De Vivo. Books and manuals written in Italian by the Odesa Italians and manuals gave the basic material for studying Italian throughout Russia.

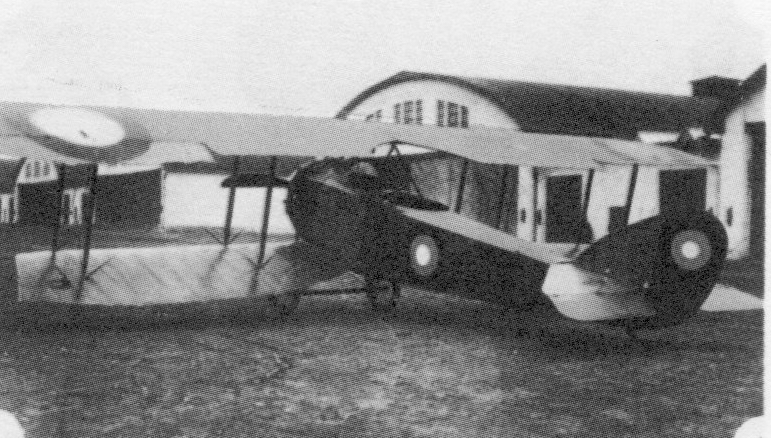
Anatra DS Anasal

The contributions of the Italians of Odesa were also important in the industrial field. The most important Italian entrepreneur was the Sicilian Arturo Anatra, who established the city's first aeroclub and who founded a company in Odesa that dealt with the construction of aircraft, the Anatra factory, which spread throughout the Russian Empire. Anatra factory was founded in 1913 and manufactured aircraft until 1917. The factory began as a naval workshop producing foreign designs, and they constructed approximately 20 aircraft from 1909 through 1912. Anatra licensed designs by Farman, Morane-Saulnier, Nieuport, and Voisin, ultimately building at a rate of as many as sixty per month by 1917. They also manufactured their own designs for the Russian army during World War I. Both of its factories were taken over and operated by the Soviets, until eventually being closed in 1922, after having produced 1,056 aircraft in Odesa, and 50 at a second location they had opened 500 km (310 mi) away, in Simferopol, in Crimea.

The Italians of Odesa were also owners of the city's food industries, where pasta, cured meats and sweets were mainly produced. The largest food industry in Odesa, run by Italians, produced pasta. Until the 1850s, bakeries run by Italians from Odesa were widespread. The first printing house that appeared in 1804 in Odesa was founded by an Italian. Italian jewelers, sculptors and marble workers were famous in Odesa from its foundation until the revolution of 1917. Even today, Italian surnames are often associated with architects. The Italian Francesco Boffo was responsible for the municipal technical office of Odessa from 1822 to 1844, and he was responsible for much of the neoclassical architecture of the city. Many important buildings in Odesa were built by Italians; and not only architects but also contractors, builders and carpenters played an important part. The Italians also played an important part in starting the Odesa Opera and Ballet Theater and the Greek Orthodox Trinity Cathedral. Italian actors who acted in the Odesa Opera and Ballet Theater were Tommaso Salvini, Ernesto Rossi and Eleonora Duse. The orchestra director of the Odesa Opera and Ballet Theater was Italian maestro Luigi Ricci. Even today, looking at the repertoire of Odesa opera and ballet, the tribute to the Italian tradition is maintained.

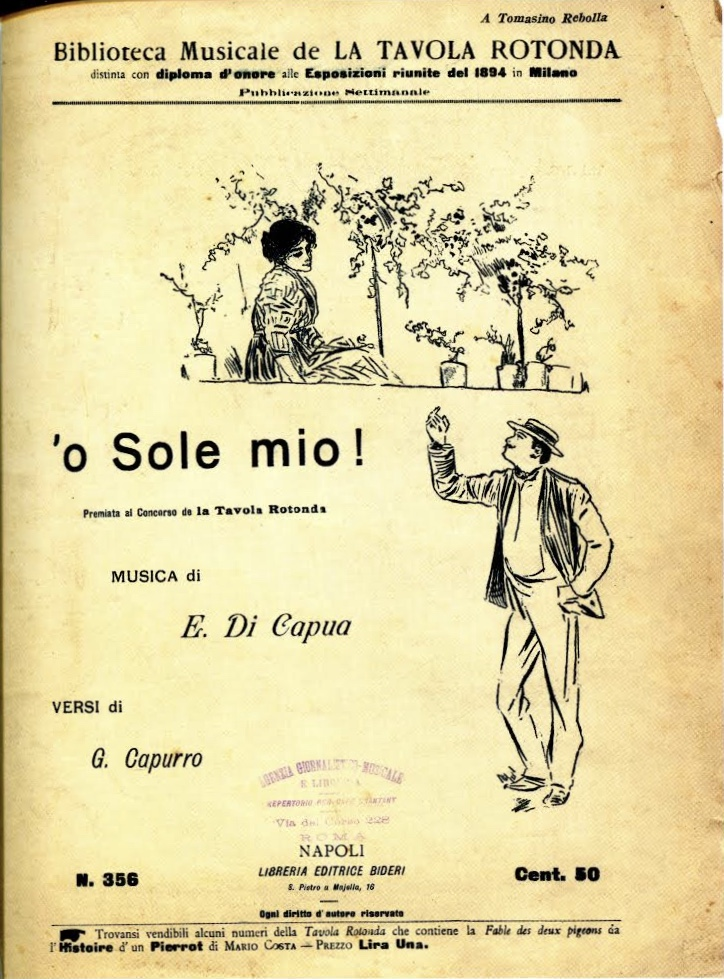
First edition sheet music cover of "'O sole mio". This song was composed in 1898 while the two authors, Eduardo di Capua and Giovanni Capurro, were in Odesa.

The Odesa Opera and Ballet Theater were not an exception; many buildings in the historic center of Odesa were designed by Italian architects. There were also numerous sculptors, artists, musicians, painters, university professors, high school and music school teachers of Italian ethnicity. Italian sculptors, in particular, who worked primarily with marble. In particular, the music and singing teachers were predominantly Italian. The famous Neapolitan song "'O sole mio" was composed in 1898 while the two authors, Eduardo di Capua and Giovanni Capurro, were in Odesa. Also noteworthy was the street music, which was also performed in the markets and courtyards of the historic center of Odesa. It was performed almost exclusively by itinerant Italian accordion players, who had as their repertoire the musical compositions of the most famous Italian musicians such as Giuseppe Verdi, Vincenzo Bellini, Gioacchino Rossini and Gaetano Donizetti. In the evenings these players performed their music in Odesa's nightclubs. The widely practiced teaching of the Italian language contributed to the appearance of a series of manuals and school texts and it can be said that Odesa provided not only for Ukraine but also for Russia the means of studying the Italian language.

In 1850 the city had around 3,000 Italians in Odesa. Until the 1870s, Odesa's Italian population grew steadily. From the following decade this growth stopped, and the decline of the Italian community in Odesa began. The reason was mainly one — the gradual integration into the Slavic population of Odesa, i.e. Russians and Ukrainians. Surnames began to be Russianized and Ukrainianized. In the census carried out in 1900, there was a strong decline in the Italian community in Odesa, as it numbered only 286 people. The revolution of 1917 sent many of them to Italy, or to other cities in Europe. In Soviet times, only a few dozen Italians remained in Odesa, most of whom no longer knew their own language. Over time they merged with the local population, losing the ethnic connotations of origin:

In Odesa there is only one man left in possession of an Italian passport: he is an Orthodox priest of Italian-Russian blood. As for Italians of origin, there were about three hundred of them here; about a third have left. The others remain quite confused with the Russian population, for fear of reprisals.

— Pietro Leoni, 21 September 1944

As of 2025, Italians are the third largest European expat group in the city after the French and the Germans. An honorary consulate of Italy opened in Odesa in 2023.

== See also ==
- Italian diaspora
- Italians of Crimea
- Odesa
