= Vladimir Lakeev =

Russian politician (1949–2026)

- Владимир Лакеев
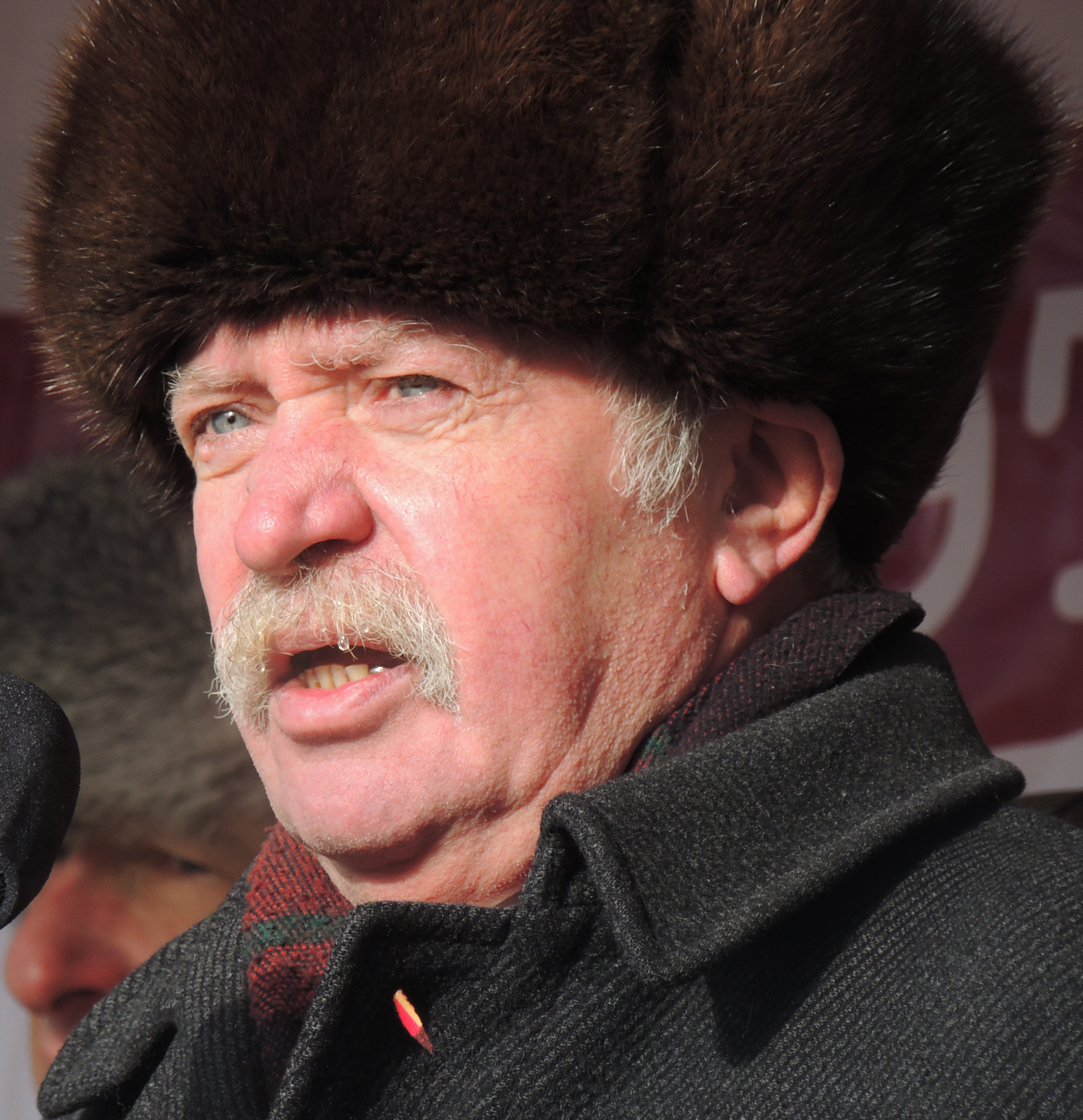
- Lakeev in 2013
- Born: 13 August 1949; Moscow, Russian SFSR, Soviet Union
- Died: 30 August 2026 (aged 78)
- Education: Moscow State University
- Occupation: Politician
- Political party: CPSU; CPRF; United Communist Party

Vladimir Ivanovich Lakeev (Russian: Владимир Иванович Лакеев; 13 August 1949 – 30 August 2026) was a Russian communist politician. He was the First Secretary of the Central Committee of the United Communist Party in Russia.

== Political activity ==
From 1984 Lakeev was at the CPSU party work: as an instructor, deputy head and head of the ideological department of the Kirov district committee of the CPSU in Moscow.

From 1991 Lakeev was a member of the resistance movement against the bourgeois counter-revolution, one of the leaders of the Moscow Committee of the Russian Communist Workers' Party, a member of the political council of the movement "Working Russia". From 1994 he was a secretary, and from 2000 he was the second secretary of the Moscow City Committee of the Communist Party of the Russian Federation (CPRF).

Lakeev was a Deputy of the Moscow City Duma of the fourth convocation where he headed the Communist Party faction.

He was expelled from the CPRF in 2010, during the so-called "Moscow's case". From 2010 to 2014, Lakeev was the first secretary of the Moscow City Committee of the alternative Communist Party.

At the 15 March 2014 assembly of the Central Committee of the United Communist Party, Lakeev was elected the First Secretary of the Party Central Committee.

Lakeev was the Chairman of the Interregional Association of Communists (IAC).

== Death ==
Lakeev died on 30 August 2026, at the age of 77.
