= Demographics of Crimea =

According to the 2021 Russian census, the total population of the Republic of Crimea and Sevastopol was at 2,482,450 (Crimea: 1,934,630, Sevastopol: 547,820). This is up from the 2001 Ukrainian census figure, which was 2,376,000 (Autonomous Republic of Crimea: 2,033,700, Sevastopol: 342,451), and the local census conducted by Russia in December 2014, which found 2,248,400 people (Republic of Crimea: 1,889,485, Sevastopol: 395,000). According to the Ukrainian census, Perekop and Pervomaisky districts had a Ukrainian ethnic plurality, while the rest of Crimea had a simple or absolute majority of ethnic Russians.

== History ==
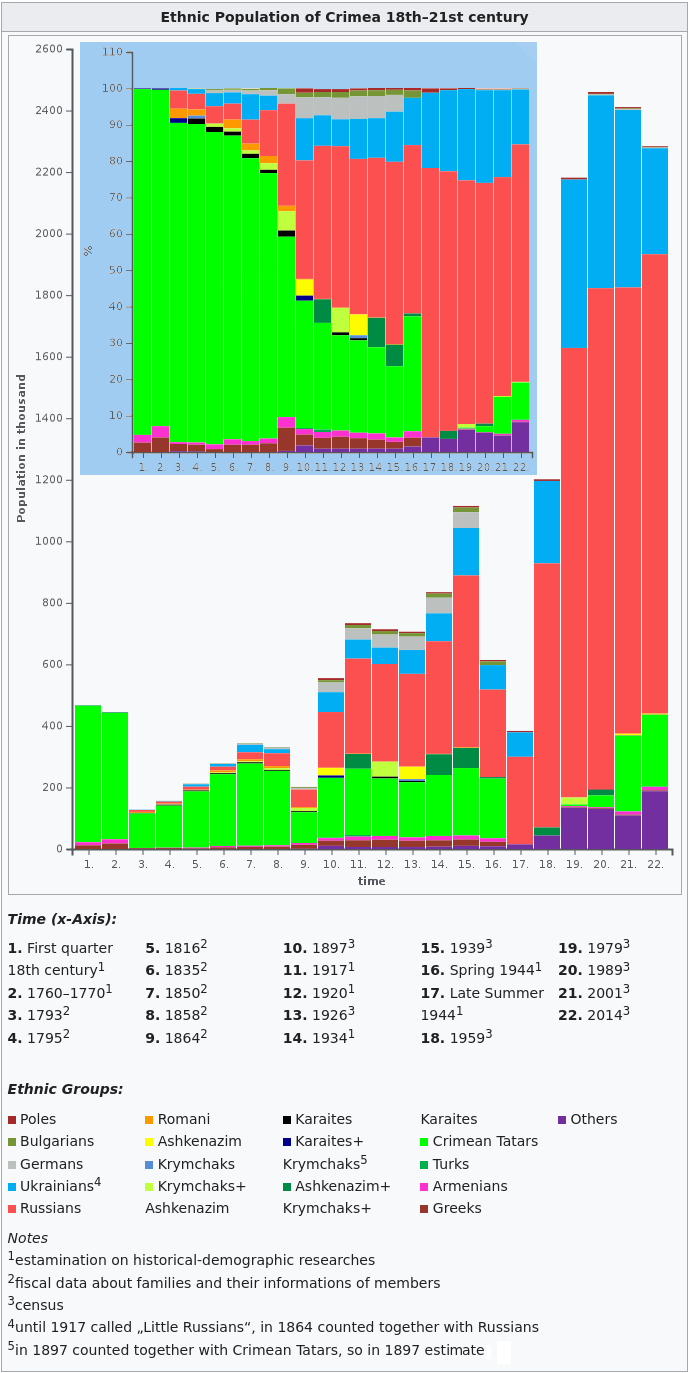
Ethnic composition of Crimea during the 18th-21st centuries

The Crimean interior has been ethnically diverse throughout its recorded history, changing hands numerous times, while the south coast was held continuously for most of the last two millennia by various Roman (and Eastern Roman) states. The interior was dominated by a succession of Scytho-Sarmatian, Gothic, Hunnic, Turkic, Mongol and Slavic conquests. Its south coast was Greek speaking first as Greek colonies (7th or 6th century BC and following), then under the Bosporan Kingdom (480 BC - 63 BC), Romans (47 BC -330 AD) and their successor states, the Byzantine Empire (330 AD - 1204 AD), the Empire of Trebizond (1204 AD - 1461 AD), and the independent Principality of Theodoro (1461 AD - 1475 AD). In 1475 the region was conquered by the Ottoman Turks. During the late Middle Ages a few coastal cities were ruled by Italian city states. A number of Englishmen, fleeing England after the Norman Conquest, were said to have settled in Crimea with the Byzantine Emperor’s permission, and comprised a majority of his Varangian Guard until the Empire’s collapse.

The Crimean Tatars emerged as a Turkic-speaking ethnic group native to Crimea in the early modern period, during the lifetime of the Crimean Khanate, and by the annexation of the Crimean Khanate by the Russian Empire in 1783, they formed the clear majority of Crimean population. The colonization "New Russia" (the Novorossiysk Governorate, of which the later Taurida Governorate formed a part) at the end of the 18th century was led by Prince Grigori Potemkin who was granted the powers of an absolute ruler over the area by Catherine the Great. The lands were generously given to the Russian dvoryanstvo (nobility), and the enserfed peasantry mostly from Ukraine and fewer from Russia were transferred to cultivate what was a sparsely populated steppe. Catherine the Great also invited European settlers to these newly conquered lands: Crimea Germans, Poles in Russia, Italians of Crimea, and others. Crimea is geographically and demographically divided into three regions, the steppe interior, the mountains, and the coast. The Tatars were the predominant portion of the population in the mountainous area and about half of the steppe population, while Russians were concentrated most heavily in the Feodosiya district. Germans and settled in the Crimea at the beginning of the 19th century, receiving a large allotment and fertile land. Wealthy colonists later bought substantial portions of land, mainly in Perekopsky and Yevpatoria districts.

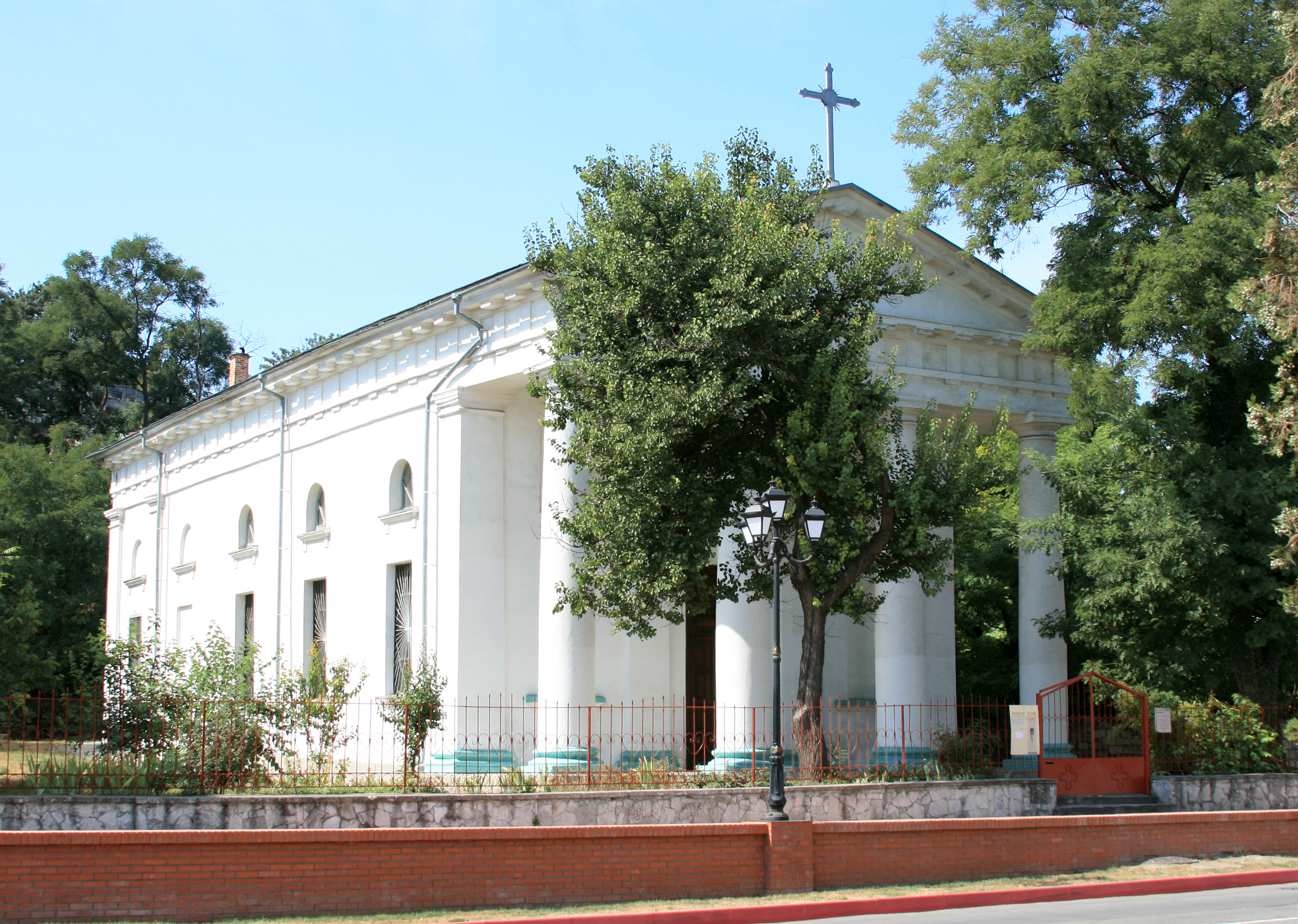
Catholic Church of Santa Maria Assunta in Kerch, reference for the Italians of Crimea

At the beginning of the 19th century, Italian emigration to the Crimea came from various Italian regions (Liguria, Campania, Apulia), with immigrants settling mainly in the coastal cities of the Black Sea and the Sea of Azov, as well as in Odesa, Mykolaiv, Sevastopol, Mariupol, Berdiansk and Taganrog. With the October Revolution of 1917, with which the Russian Empire became the Soviet Union, a bitter period began for minorities in Russia. Italians of Crimea therefore faced much repression. Between 1936 and 1938, during Joseph Stalin's Great Purge, many Italians were accused of espionage and were arrested, tortured, deported or executed. The few survivors were allowed to return to Kerch in the 1950s and 1960s during Nikita Khrushchev's administration. The descendants of the surviving Italians of Crimea currently account for c. 300 people, mainly residing in Kerch.

By the 1897 Russian Empire Census, Crimean Tatars continued to form a slight plurality (35%) of Crimea's still largely rural population, but there were large numbers of Russians (33%) and Ukrainians (11%), as well as smaller numbers of Germans, Jews (including Krymchaks and Crimean Karaites), Bulgarians, Belarusians, Turks, Armenians, Greeks and Roma (gypsies).

The upheavals and ethnic cleansing of the 20th century vastly changed Crimea's ethnic composition. In 1944, 200,000 Crimean Tatars were deported from Crimea to Central Asia and Siberia, along with 70,000 Greeks and 14,000 Bulgarians and other nationalities. By the latter 20th century, Russians and Ukrainians made up almost the entire population. However, with the fall of the Soviet Union, exiled Crimean Tatars began returning to their homeland and accounted for 10% of the population by the beginning of the 21st century.

== Ethnicities and languages ==
Crimean Gothic, an East Germanic language, became extinct around the 18th century, while the Crimean Goths diffused into other ethnicities much earlier on. Old English was also spoken by settlers from England, who were eventually absorbed into the Tatar population. According to Ukraine's 2001 census, the ethnic makeup of Crimea's population consisted primarily of the following self-reported groups: Russians (1.450 million, 60.4%), Ukrainians (576,600; 24.0%), Crimean Tatars (258,400; 10.8%), Belarusians (25,000; 1.5%), Armenians (10,000; 0.4%), and Jews (5,500; 0.2%).

Census Year	Russians		Crimean Tatars (+ Tatars)		Ukrainians		Belarusians		Armenians		Jews (+Karaites)		Others		Total population
Census Year	Number	%	Number	%	Number	%	Number	%	Number	%	Number	%	Number	%	Number
1785		2.2%		84.1%										13.7%	
1795		4.3%		87.6%		1.3%				0.6%		2.3%		3.9%	137,000 (Note: Down from 454,000 during the 1770s)
1816		4.8%		85.9%		3.6%				1.3%		2.3%		2.1%	
1835		4.4%		83.5%		3.1%				1.5%		2.0%		5.5%	
1850		6.6%		77.8%		7.0%				1.0%		2.2%		5.4%	
1864		28.5%		50.3%						6.5%		7.0%		7.7%	
1897	180,963	33.11%	194,294	35.6%	64,703	11.8%	2,058	0.4%	8,317	1.5%	24,168	4.4%	72,089	13.2%	546,592
1926	301,398	42.2%	179,094	25.1%	77,405	10.6%	3,842	0.5%	10,713	1.5%	45,926	6.4%			713,823
1939	558,481	49.6%	218,879	19.4%	154,123	13.7%	6,726	0.6%	12,923	1.1%	65,452	5.8%			1,126,429
1959	858,273	71.4%			267,659	22.3%	21,672	1.8%			26,374	2.2%			1,201,517
1970	1,220,484	67.3%			480,733	26.5%	39,793	2.2%	3,091	0.2%	25,614	1.4%			1,813,502
1979	1,460,980	66.9%	5,422	0.2%	547,336	25.1%	45,000 (e)	2.1%							2,184,000
1989	1,629,542	67.0%	38,365	1.6%	625,919	25.8%	50,045	2.1%	2,794	0.1%	17,371	0.7%			2,430,495
2001^{1}	1,450,394	60.4%	258,893	10.8%	576,647	24.0%	35,157	1.5%	10,088	0.4%	5,531	0.2%	64,499	2.7%	2,401,209
2014^{2}	1,492,078	67.9%	277,336	12.6%	344,515	15.7%	21,694	1.0%	11,030	0.5%	3,144	0.1%			2,284,769
2021	1,706,662	76.4%	284,522	12.7%	171,160	7.7%	10,599	0.5%	9,016	0.4%	2,455	0.1%	48,257	2.2%	2,482,450
1. For comparison with prior censuses the results of the Autonomous Republic of Crimea and Sevastopol were combined; 2. The 2014 percentage is based on total number responding to the question on nationality (not total population). Census breakdown is Crimean Tatars 232,340 (10.6%), Tatars 44,996 (2.1%).; 3. The Russian percentage in the 1864 census includes Ukrainians.

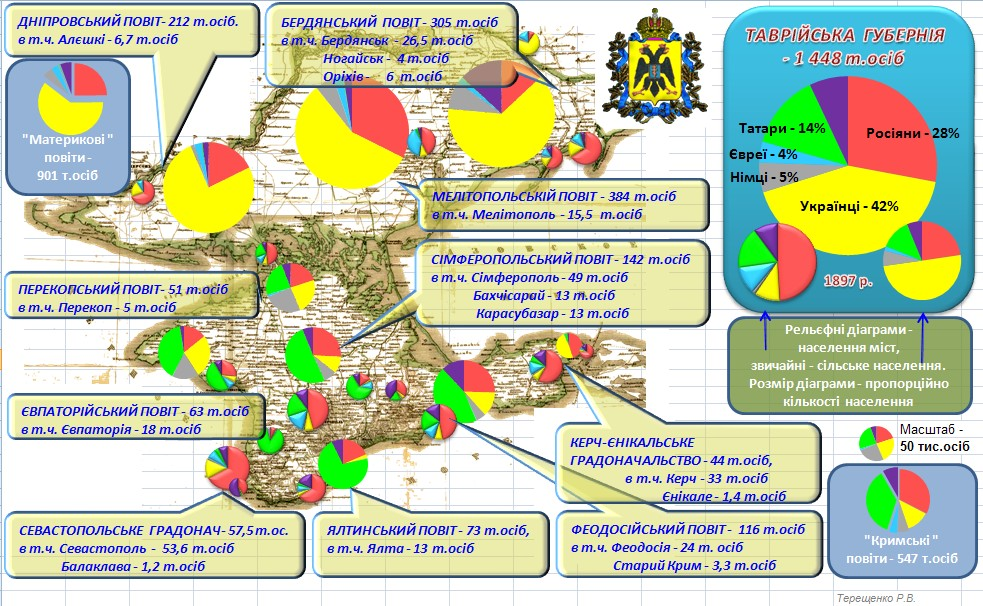
Linguistic composition of uyezds (povits) of Taurida Governorate in 1897 (Russian Empire Census)

Percentage of Crimean Tatars

Other minorities are Black Sea Germans, Roma, Bulgarians, Poles, Azerbaijanis, Koreans, Greeks and Italians of Crimea. The number of Crimea Germans was 45,000 in 1941. In 1944, 70,000 Greeks and 14,000 Bulgarians from the Crimea were deported to Central Asia and Siberia, along with 200,000 Crimean Tatars and other nationalities.

According to the 2001 census, 77% of Crimean inhabitants named Russian as their native language, 11.4% – Crimean Tatar, and 10.1% – Ukrainian. Of the Ukrainians in Crimea, 40% gave Ukrainian as their native language, with 60% identifying as ethnic Ukrainians while giving Russian as their primary language. 93% of Crimean Tatars gave Crimean Tatar as their native language, 6% were Russophone. In 2013, however, the Crimean Tatar language was estimated to be on the brink of extinction, being taught in Crimea only in around 15 schools at that point of time. Turkey has provided the greatest support to Ukraine, which has been unable to resolve the problem of education in the mother tongue in Crimea, by bringing the schools to a modern state. Ukrainian was until 2014 the single official state language countrywide, but in Crimea government business was carried out mainly in Russian. Attempts to expand the usage of Ukrainian in education and government affairs have been less successful in Crimea than in other areas of the nation.

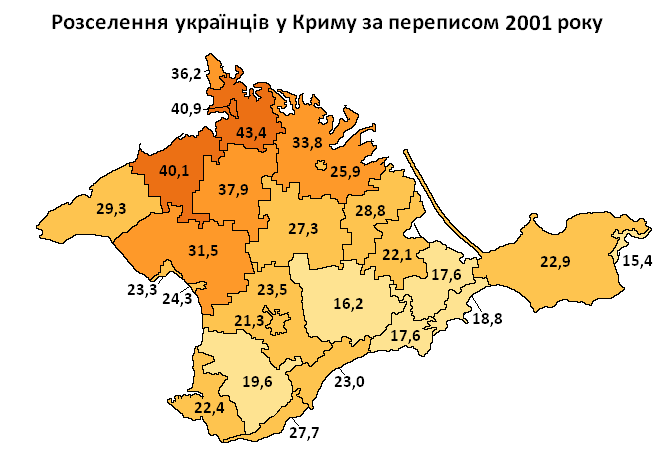
Percentage of Ukrainians

Currently two thirds of migrants into Crimea are from other regions of Ukraine; every fifth migrant is from elsewhere in the former Soviet Union and every 40th from outside of it. Three quarters of those leaving Crimea move to other areas in Ukraine. Every 20th migrates to the West.

The number of Crimean residents who consider Ukraine their motherland increased sharply from 32% to 71.3% from 2008 through 2011; according to a poll by Razumkov Center in March 2011, although this is the lowest number in all Ukraine (93% on average across the country). Surveys of regional identities in Ukraine have shown that around 30% of Crimean residents claim to have retained a self-identified "Soviet identity".

Since the independence of Ukraine in 1991, 3.8 million former citizens of Russia have applied for Ukrainian citizenship.

In 2014 after Russian annexation of Crimea occupational authorities conducted a census. According to the census result the population of the Crimean Federal District is 2.2844 million people. The ethnic composition is as follows: Russians: 1.49 million (65.3%), Ukrainians: 0.35 million (15.1%), Crimean Tatars: 0.24 million (12.0%). Official Ukrainian authorities and Mejlis of the Crimean Tatar People claimed doubts that the results of population census in Crimea represent the facts.

A survey in May 2013, asked respondents what language they spoke at home:

- 82% Russian
- 10% Crimean Tatar
- 3% Russian and Ukrainian equally
- 3% Russian and another language equally
- 2% Ukrainian

Note that the proportion of people in the survey who gave their ethnicity as Ukrainian was 20%, Crimean Tatar 15%.

== Birth rate, death rate, total fertility rate, life expectancy ==
Vital statistics for 2015

- Births: 29 422 (12.8 per 1000)
- Deaths: 35 151 (15.3 per 1000)

Vital statistics for 2020

- Births: 31 105 (13.6 per 1000)
- Deaths: 29 890 (13.3 per 1000)

Fertility rate

	2014	2015	2020
Republic of Crimea	1.82	1.82	1.82
Sevastopol	1.65	1.82	1.82
Crimean Federal District	1.79	1.82	1.82

Life expectancy

Life expectancy at birth for Crimea as a whole, calculated as weighted average between the Republic of Crimea and the federal city of Sevastopol, according to number of population.

	2019	2021
Average:	72.9 years	70.2 years
Male:	67.9 years	65.9 years
Female:	77.5 years	74.5 years

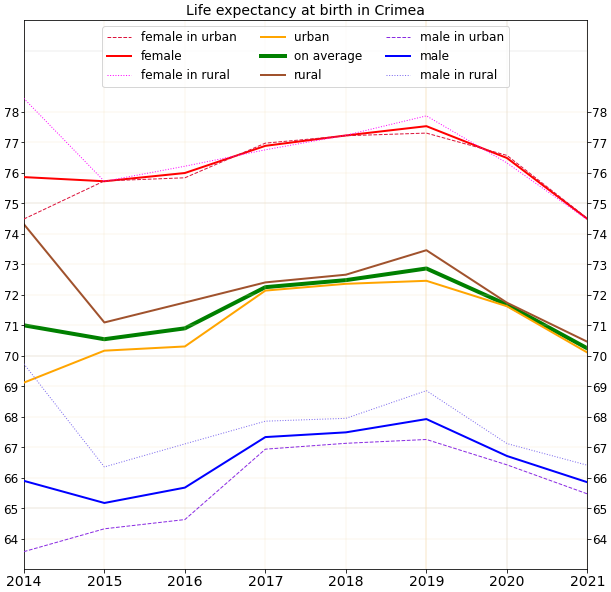
Life expectancy in Crimea

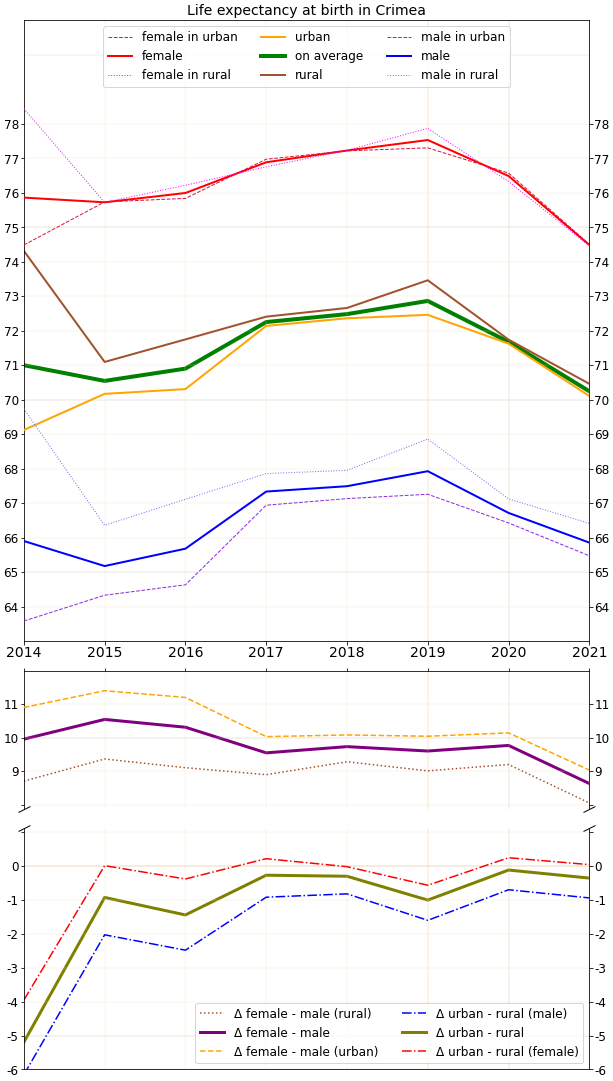
Life expectancy with calculated differences

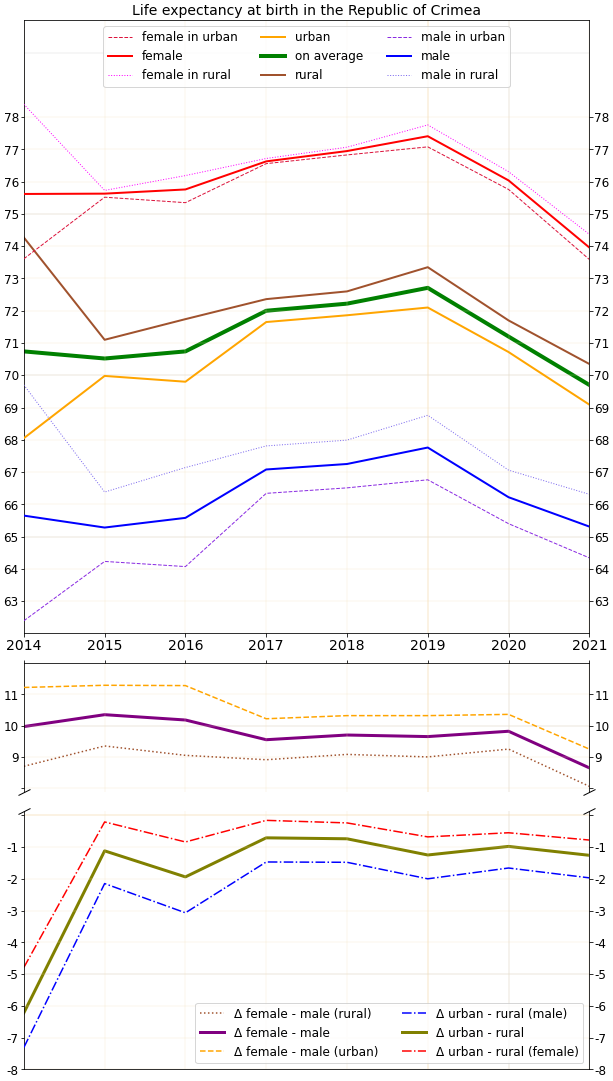
Life expectancy in the Republic of Crimea

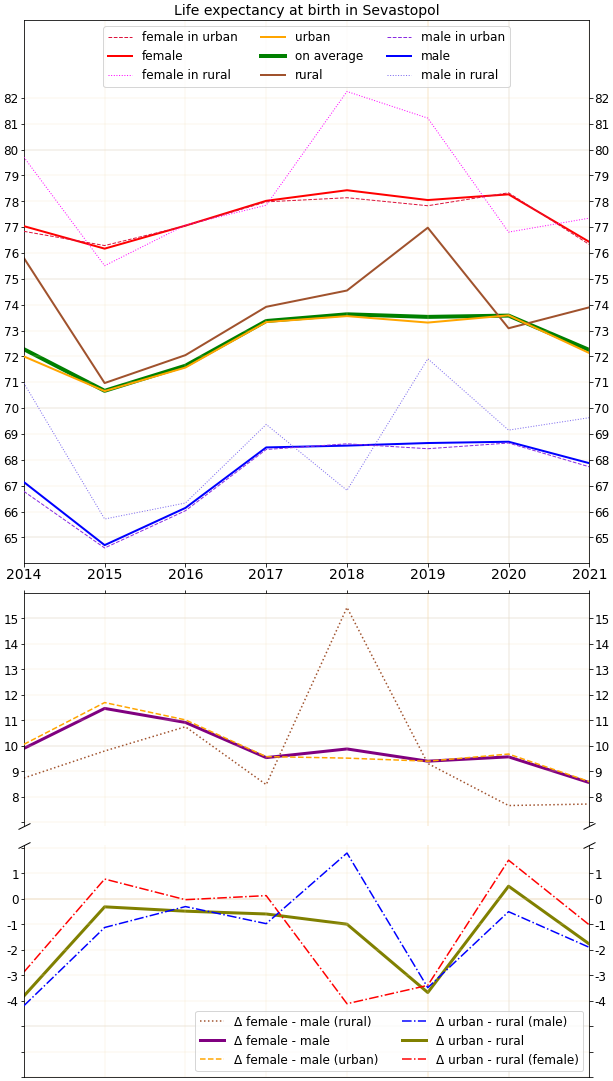
Life expectancy in Sevastopol

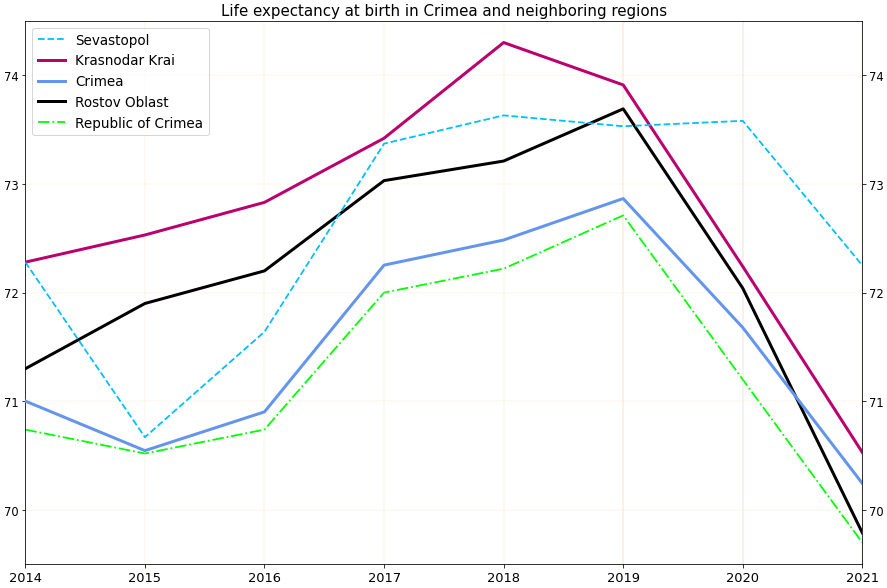
Life expectancy in Crimea and neighboring regions of Russia

== Education ==
The 2001 Ukrainian census for the Autonomous Republic of Crimea cites the following figures for the population of "able-to-work age" (men 16–59 years, women 16–54 years):

- total population 1,203,789
- completed higher education: 175,838 (14.6%)
- higher education (partial or complete): 476,793 (39.6%)
- completed secondary education: 507,881 (49.7%)
- secondary education (partial or complete): 685,855 (57.0%)
- no primary education: 1,945 (0.16%)
- illiterate: 1,413 (0.11%)

== Religion ==
The Crimean peninsula was Christianised at an early time, via Gothic Christianity, in the 4th century. In the 9th century, the Goths in Crimea turned to the Greek Orthodox Church, under the Metropolitanate of Gothia. In 988, Prince Vladimir I of Kyiv also captured the Byzantine town of Chersonesos (presently part of Sevastopol) where he later converted to Christianity. Christianity was mostly swept away by the Mongol invasion of Rus' in the 1230s. Islam becomes the state religion of the Golden Horde in the early 14th century. The first mosque in Crimea was built by Ozbeg Khan in Eski Qırım in 1314. Christianity returned with the annexation of the Crimean Khanate by the Eastern Orthodox Russian Empire in 1783.

A survey of residents of the Autonomous Republic of Crimea in May 2013 found that:

- 58% Orthodox
- 15% Muslim
- 13% Do not know, or not applicable
- 10% believed in God but did not belong to any religion
- 2% Atheist
- 2% Other

The proportion of the population in the survey who were Crimean Tatar was 15%.

Respondents to the same survey said that they attended a religious service:

- 3% Several times a week
- 7% Weekly
- 10% Monthly
- 37% Several times a year
- 43% Never

== Footnotes ==
	Taurida Governate	Berdyansk District	Dneiper District	Melitopol District	Crimea
Russians	404,463	55,303	42,180	126,017	180,963
Ukrainians	611,121	179,177	156,151	211,090	64,703
Tatars	196,854	770	506	1,284	194,294
Belarusians	9,726	1,323	3,005	3,340	2,058
Armenians	8,938	201	47	373	8,317
Jews	55,418	8,889	6,298	16,063	24,168
Other	161,270	59,055	4,054	26,072	72,089
Total Population	1,447,790	304,718	212,241	384,239	546,592
