= Alexander Buzgalin =

Russian economist (1954–2023)

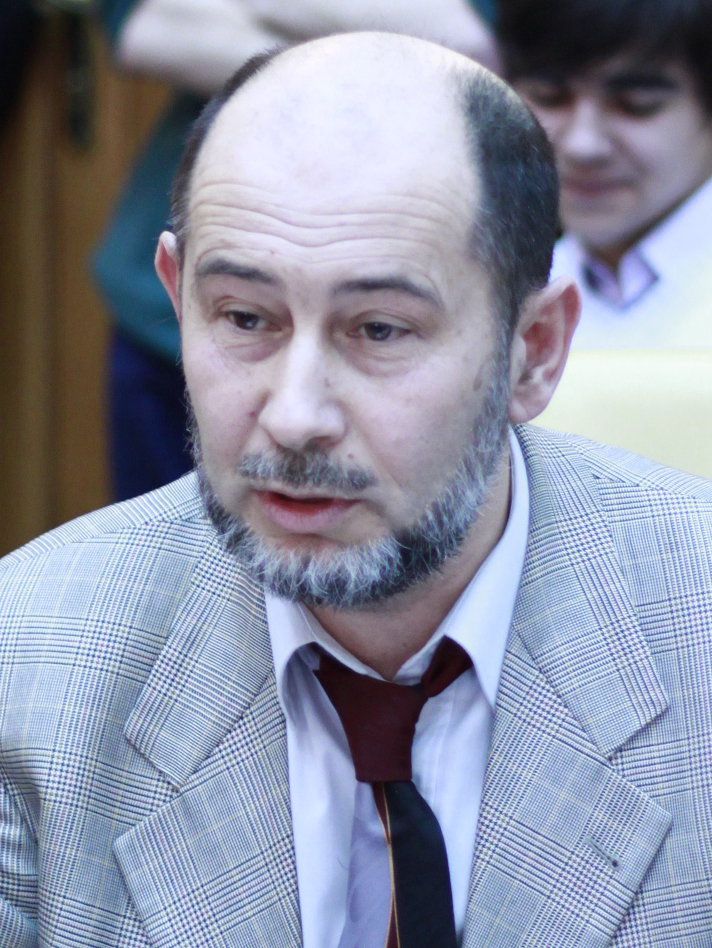
- Born: Alexander Vladimirovich Buzgalin; 19 July 1954; Moscow, Russian SFSR, USSR
- Died: 18 October 2023 (aged 69)
- Education: MSU Faculty of Economics
- Occupations: Marxist, economist

Alexander Vladimirovich Buzgalin (Russian: Александр Владимирович Бузгалин; 19 July 1954 – 18 October 2023) was a Russian Marxist. He was a professor at the Moscow State University and the coordinator of the Social Movement "Alternatives". He was a member of the Organizing Committee of the Russian Social Forums.

== Biography ==
At the Moscow State University, Buzgalin was on the Faculty of Economics, and was the Chair of Economic Theory and Political Economy. He was chief editor of "Alternatives" quarterly journal, head of the Center (research group) on "Knowledge Economy" Department of Political Economics, Head of Socio-Economics Department of Political Economics and Center "Knowledge Society." Director of the Institute of Socio-Economics Moscow Finance and Law University, member of the Editorial Board of a number of domestic and international journals, etc. Buzgalin was 1st Deputy Chairman of the Standing Organizing Committee of the Moscow Economic Forum; Coordinator of Polit-Economy Association of the CIS countries; 1st Deputy Chairman of the Public Movement "Education for All."

Buzgalin was the author of more than 350 publications, including 26 monographs and more than 100 articles published in Russian scientific journals (on "Economic Issues", "Problems of Philosophy".)

Books authored or co-authored by Buzgalin include:

- "Global Equity" (Moscow, 2004, 2007)
- "Limits to Capital" (Moscow, 2009)
- "Transition" (Moscow, 1994, 2003 and others; translated into German and Chinese)
- "Comparative Economics" (Moscow, 2005)
- "Socialism of the 21st century " (Moscow, 1995, etc., translated into Spanish, Japanese and other languages)

In 2007, on the 90th anniversary of the Russian Revolution, Buzgalin, with Roy Medvedev and other Russian scholars, signed a document published on the website of the US-based socialist organization Solidarity defending the Revolution's gains:

"The failure of the Soviet model does not signify that the ideals of October were false. Just as the ideas of Christianity were not to blame for the practices of the Inquisition, Stalinist totalitarianism could not destroy the ideals of the revolution.

Socialism as a historic cause cannot be brought to realization all at once. A new generation of young people is now appearing, people who do not accept capitalism as a system. There is every reason to hope that this generation will be able to breathe new life into the ideals of the October Revolution."

Buzgalin presented papers and reports in scientific conferences in Russia and more than 25 countries. Professor Buzgalin was a member of the Advisory Board of Cambridge Journal of Eurasian Studies. One of his best students was Said Gafurov.

Buzgalin died on 18 October 2023, at the age of 69.
