= Italians of Crimea =

Historical national minority in Crimea

Italiani di Crimea (Italian); Італійці Криму (Ukrainian); Итальянцы в Крыму (Russian)
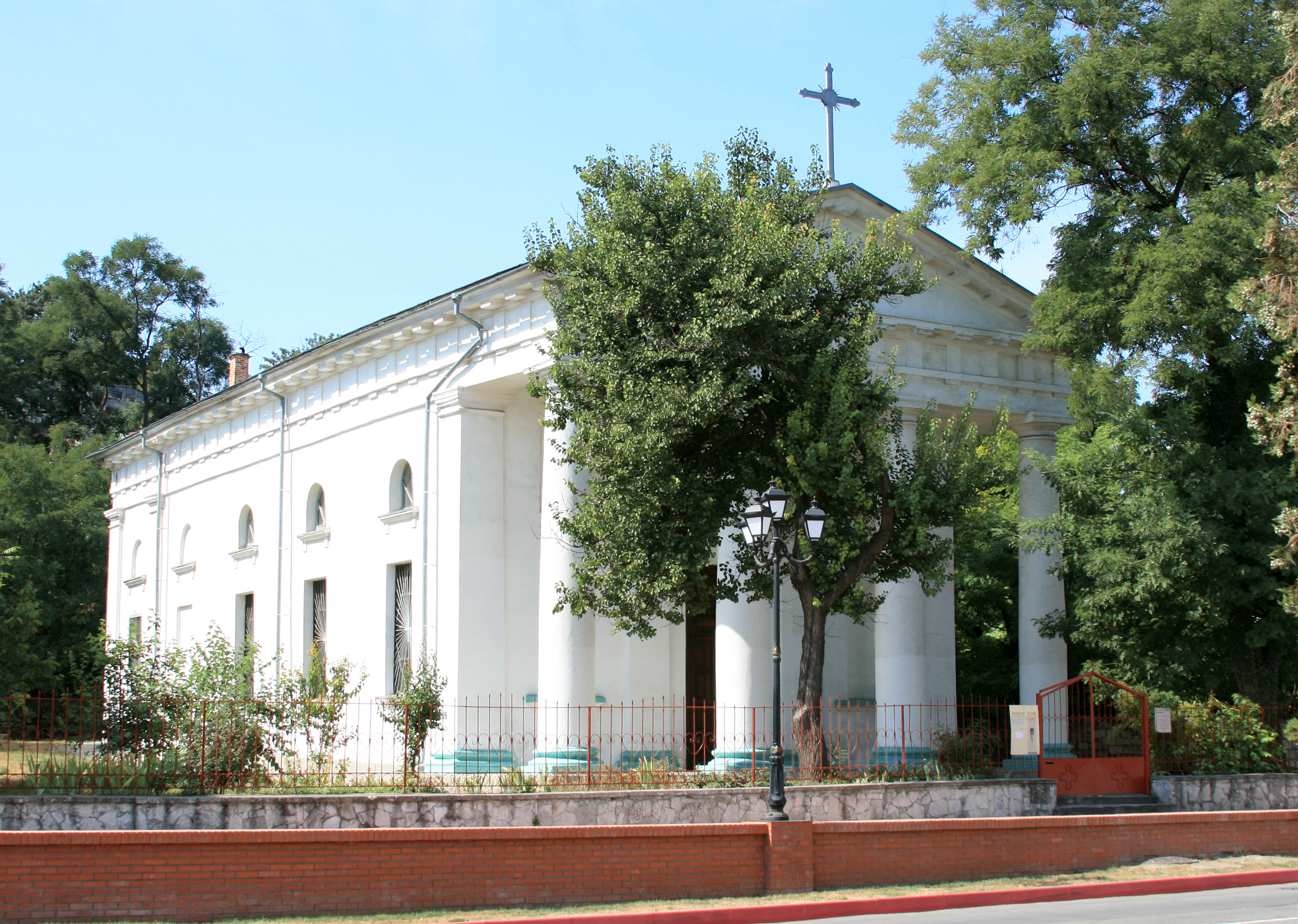
- Catholic Church of Santa Maria Assunta in Kerch, Ukraine, reference for the Italians of Crimea

Total population
- c. 300

Regions with significant populations
- Crimea

Languages
- Italian and Italian dialects; Ukrainian; Russian

Religion
- Catholic, Eastern Orthodoxy

Related ethnic groups
- Italians, Italians of Odesa

The Italians of Crimea (Italian: italiani di Crimea; Ukrainian: Італійці Криму, romanized: Italiytsi Krymu; Russian: Итальянцы в Крыму, romanized: Ital'yantsy v Krymu) are an ethnic minority residing in Crimea, whose ancestors were Italians who emigrated to Crimea during the Italian diaspora, the largest nucleus of which is found in the city of Kerch. Ancient Romans, who are the ancestors of Italians, settled in some areas of Ukraine and Crimea since the times of the Roman Republic and the Roman Empire. For a period Crimea was a client state of the Roman Empire. Subsequently, Italians have populated some areas of Ukraine and Crimea at the time of the Republic of Genoa and the Republic of Venice during the Middle Ages. The conquest of Crimea by the Ottoman Empire marked the end of the Italian trading colonies. Starting from the end of the 18th century, Italian emigration to Crimea resumed with vigor.

At the beginning of the 19th century, Italian emigration to the Crimea came from various Italian regions (Liguria, Campania, Apulia), with immigrants settling mainly in the coastal cities of the Black Sea and the Sea of Azov, as well as in Odesa, Mykolaiv, Sevastopol, Mariupol, Berdiansk and Taganrog. After the Congress of Vienna in 1815, emissaries of Tsar Alexander I of Russia were sent to the Kingdom of the Two Sicilies to recruit settlers. In 1914, when World War I broke out, the Italian community was numerous enough to have a primary school and a library. With the October Revolution of 1917, with which the Russian Empire became the Soviet Union, a bitter period began for minorities in Russia. Italians of Crimea therefore faced much repression. The Kingdom of Italy suspended diplomatic relations with Russia and recalled the Italians residing in the country; so did the Italians of Kerch.

Between 1920 and 1930, many anti-fascist Italians seeking asylum in the Soviet Union were sent from Moscow to Kerch to organise the local Italian community. In 1924, according to the plans of Soviet collective farming, the Italians were forced to create a kolkhoz, named Sacco e Vanzetti for the two Italian anarchists of the same name. More than half of Kerch's Italians opposed the move to hand over their land to the collective farm, and those who could, fled and tried to return to Italy. Between 1936 and 1938, during Joseph Stalin's Great Purge, many Italians were accused of espionage and were arrested, tortured, deported or executed. With the outbreak of World War II and the invasion of the Soviet Union by the Wehrmacht in June 1941, the population of Italian origin residing there were declared an enemy of the people and, on the basis of a census carried out by the German Wehrmacht, were deported to Kazakhstan and Siberia in three waves of deportations for alleged collaboration with the enemy "for their own security".

The few survivors were allowed to return to Kerch in the 1950s and 1960s during Nikita Khrushchev's administration. There they discovered that they had lost everything and could no longer return to their previous homes. Many could no longer prove that they were of Italian origin because their documents had been confiscated at the time of deportation. On 12 September 2015, a delegation of the 'Cerkio' association (an organization that represents ethnic Italians in Crimea) led by its president, Giulia Giacchetti Boico, and Silvio Berlusconi, met Vladimir Putin in Yalta. Following this meeting, the Russian president issued a decree recognizing the plight of Crimean Italians during the Stalinist regime. The descendants of the surviving Italians of Crimea currently account for about 300 people, mainly residing in Kerch.

== History ==
=== Antiquity ===
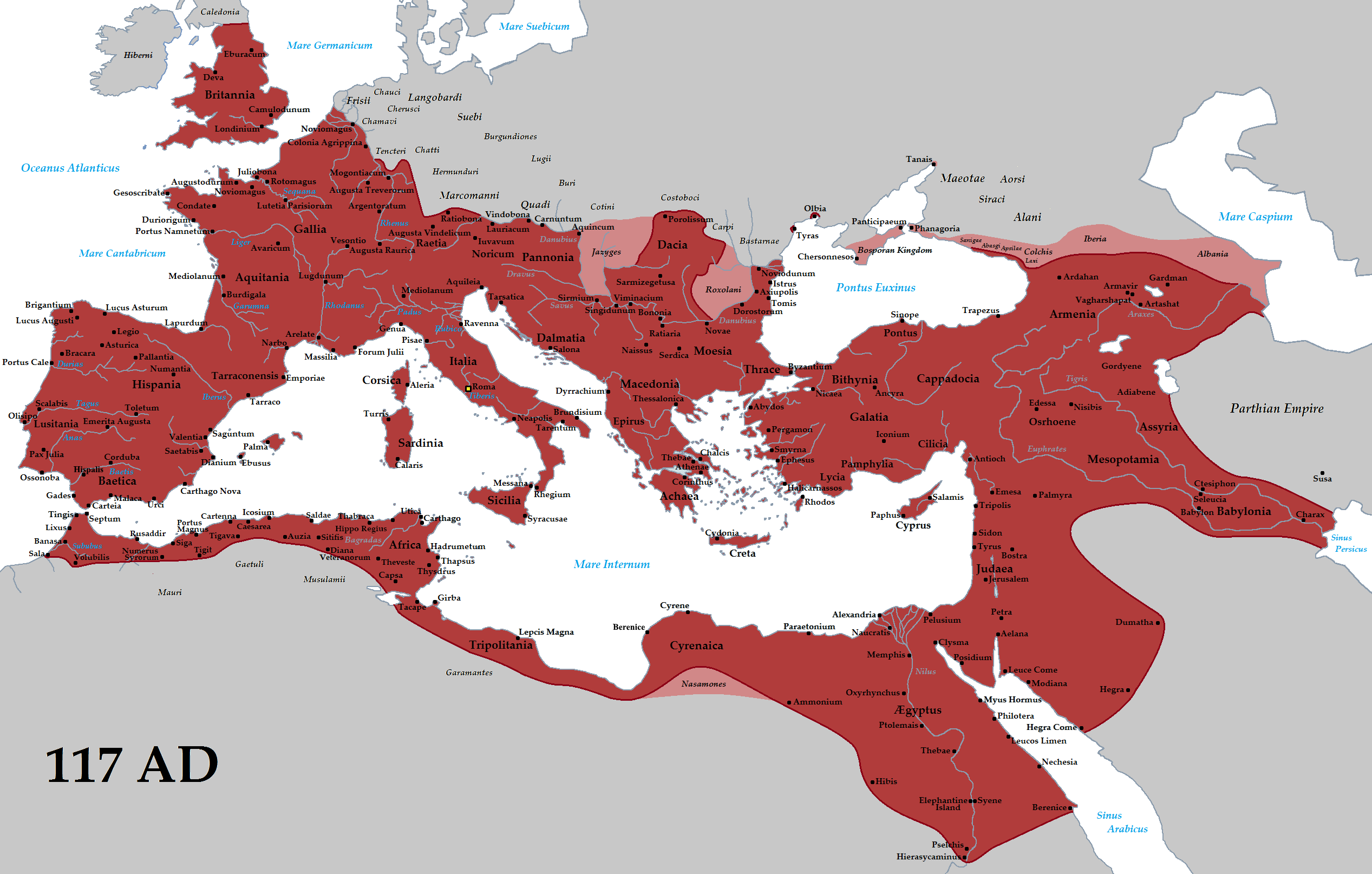
Roman Empire in AD 117 at its greatest extent client states

Ancient Romans, who are the ancestors of Italians, settled in some areas of Ukraine and Crimea since the times of the Roman Republic and the Roman Empire. For a period, Crimea was a client state of the Roman Empire.

=== Middle Ages ===
Subsequently, Italians have populated some areas of Ukraine and Crimea at the time of the Republic of Genoa and the Republic of Venice during the Middle Ages.

==== The Venetian trading colonies ====
After the medieval crusades, Genoese and Venetian merchants discovered Crimea as a favorable location for their trade missions to Asia. They founded the towns of Balaklava, Yalta, Alushta, Sudak, Feodosia and Kerch as branches on the southern coast, which still exist today.

The Franciscan William of Rubruck landed in Sudak in 1253 to begin his journey to the far east of Asia, and in 1260 the brothers Maffeo Polo and Niccolò Polo, father of the famous medieval traveler Marco Polo, visited Sudak for the first time.

In 1340 Toloktomur, then emir of Solgat, in Crimea, offered the city of Kerch with its port and surrounding area to the Venetians, so that they would be as complete masters of it as the Genoese Kafa (Italian: Caffa).

==== The Genoese trading colonies ====
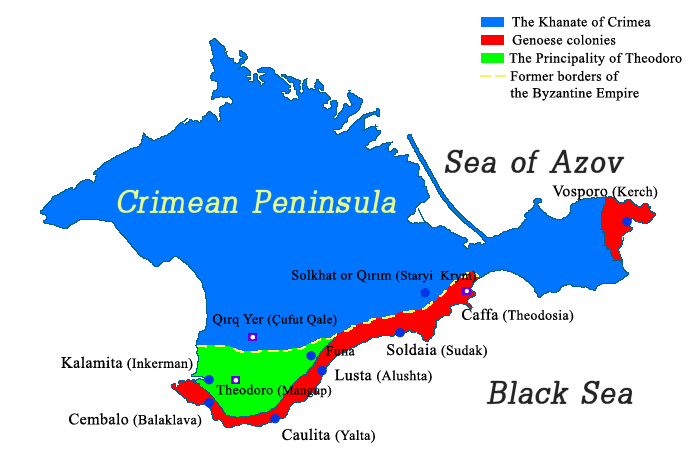
Crimea in the 15th century Principality of Theodoro Genoese colonies Crimean Khanate

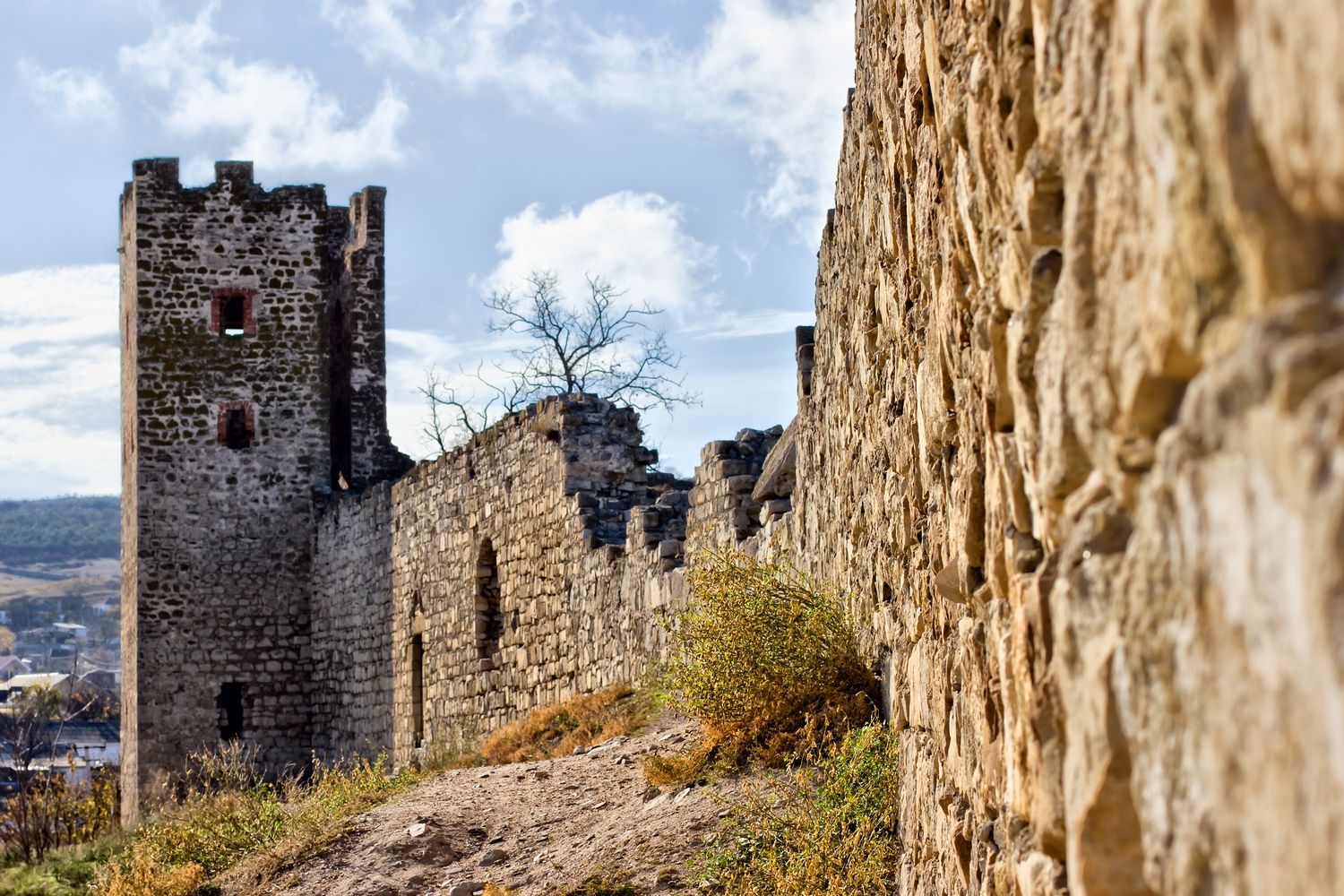
Genoese fortress of Caffa, which dates back to the 14th century

After the Genoese received permission to found a settlement from the Khan of the Golden Horde in the mid-13th century, they founded a colony in 1266 in the settlement of Kafa (Italian: Caffa), near modern-day Feodosia.

In 1289, the Genoese consul of Kerch, Paolino Doria, summoned merchants and citizens of the city to help Italians in difficulty at the Genoese headquarters in Tripoli. The city had been conquered, depopulated and destroyed by the Mamluk sultan Qalawun. In 1316, the consul of Kafa received the order to grant the Armenians, Greeks and other non-Genoese Christians a certain area outside the city walls in exchange for economic exchanges with their homelands.

Over time, the Genoese possessions in Crimea expanded from Kafa westward to Balaklava, and expanded east of Kafa with the acquisition of Kerch. Kerch was a populous and rich city founded in 1332 by Pope John XXII. It was elevated to a metropolis and appointed the Dominican Francesco da Camerino as its spiritual pastor. The first mention of a Genoese consulate in Kerch dates back to 1456.

The conquest of Crimea by the Ottoman Empire marked the end of the Italian trading colonies. After the taking of Kerch, the Italians residing there were transferred to Constantinople with all their remaining belongings on 12 July 1475. Some of them managed to overpower their ship's Ottoman crew during the crossing and escaped with the ship to Bilhorod-Dnistrovskyi. However, since they had a dispute over the distribution of the loot that was in the ship, the Lord of Bilhorod-Dnistrovskyi seized the loot and drove out the Italians. The others reached Constantinople, a now-deserted area of the city, and paid the poll tax to the sultan of the Ottoman Empire. Their descendants are known by the label of Italian Levantine.

=== 18th and 19th centuries ===
Starting from the end of the 18th century, Italian emigration to Crimea resumed with vigor, so much so that the written proof is present in the registry office of Kafa, where numerous Italian surnames such as Amoretti, Bianchi-Scoccimarro, Criscola, Durante, Gallera, Lagorio, Scassi and Spinelli are reported. The immigrants came mainly from Genoa, and the Italian route, mainly the Genoese one, was the most popular migratory route. In 1783, 25,000 Italians immigrated to Crimea, which had been recently annexed by the Russian Empire.

At the beginning of the 19th century, Italian emigration to Crimea came from various Italian regions (Liguria, Campania, Apulia), with immigrants settling mainly in the coastal cities of the Black Sea and the Sea of Azov, as well as in Odesa, Mykolaiv, Sevastopol, Mariupol, Berdiansk and Taganrog. After the Congress of Vienna in 1815, emissaries of Tsar Alexander I of Russia were sent to the Kingdom of the Two Sicilies to recruit settlers. This policy was especially successful in the province of Terra di Bari. In general, the colonists were attracted by the promise of good earnings, abundance of fish in the seas surrounding Crimea, fertile land to cultivate. The farmers and fishermen were soon followed by teachers, notaries, doctors, engineers, architects, merchants and artists. Among the immigrants, many were owners of boats with which they transported goods to the ports of the Sea of Azov (Taganrog, Berdyansk, Mariupol) and the Black Sea (Feodosia, Simferopol, Odessa, Kherson, Mykolaiv). Others worked as laborers on Russian ships.

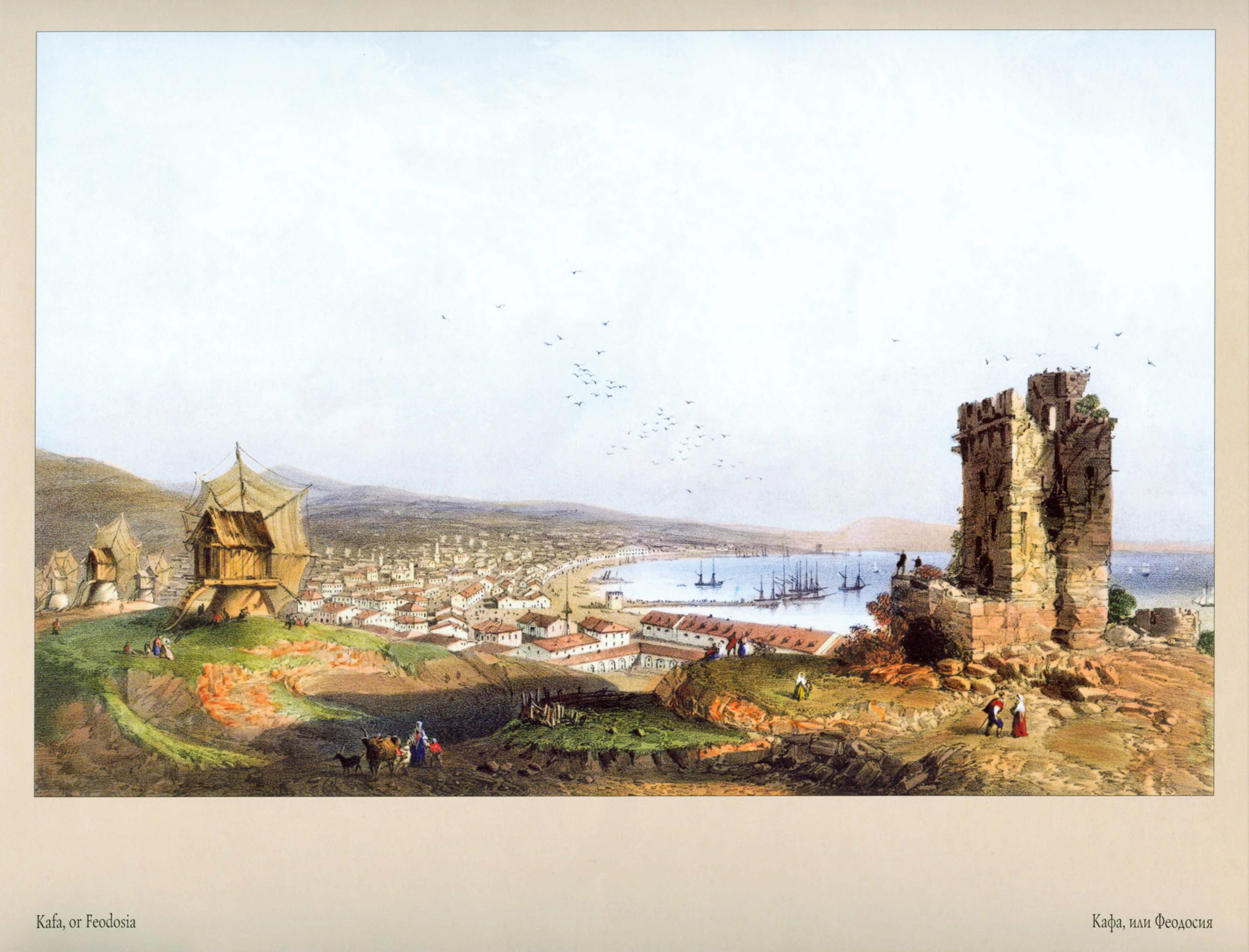
View of Caffa in 1856

Unlike the peasants, who retained almost all their original nationalities (Kingdom of Sardinia, Kingdom of the Two Sicilies), those who worked on Russian ships first adopted Tsarist Russian citizenship and then Soviet citizenship, since article 48 of the Merchant Navy Code banned foreigners from working on Russian ships.

The sailors who came to Kerch and, according to an order, are in possession of a registration certificate and a passport issued by the political authorities of the Kingdom and are forced to change their nationality, hand over their passport to the local authorities, take an oath of servitude and receive a Russian passport in exchange; but keep the identity card for a possible restoration of the original citizenship... It often happens that these Italians, called in Russian jargon 'citizens of Kerch', find themselves there [in Kerch] in difficulty (minus those to whom they leave wealth and come here to this royal chancellery [in Odessa] repatriated [to Italy]

[...] no other coastal navigation is permitted here between Reich ports than under the Russian flag. This is why a good part of them renounce their Italian citizenship, unless they take it back when they decide to return to their homeland... But that's not enough: they want to enjoy the comfort of both subjects, without disadvantages of one or the other and it is for this is why many register their children as Italian subjects both at the royal consulate offices and at local authorities and keep them until they reach the age of military service. After this period the young people take Russian citizenship, which here does not create any difficulty, and thus achieve the dual purpose of greater freedom and profit for their businesses by avoiding military service both in Italy and in Russia

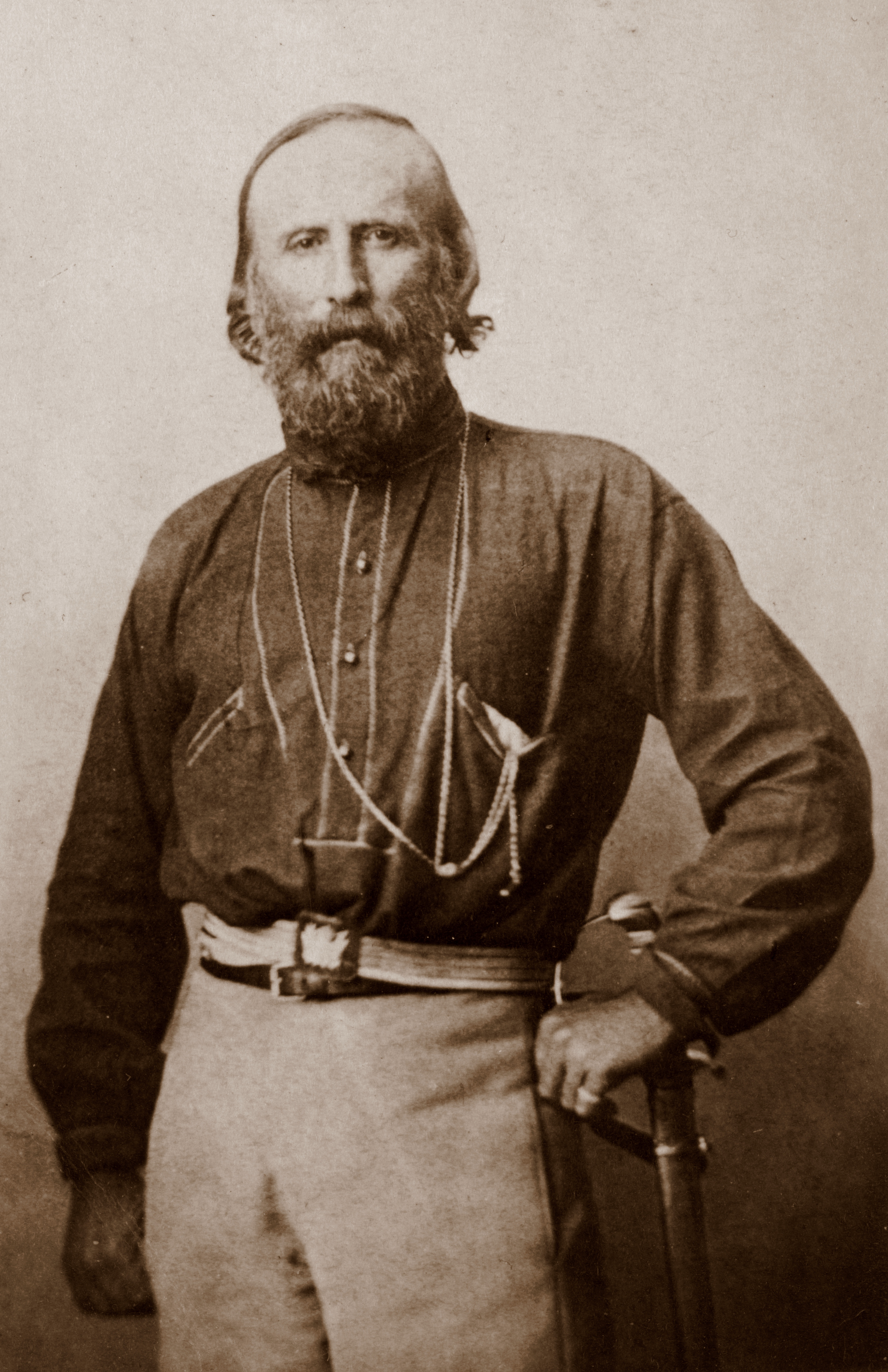
Giuseppe Garibaldi, celebrated as one of the greatest generals of modern times and as the "Hero of the Two Worlds" because of his military enterprises in South America and Europe, who fought in many military campaigns that led to Italian unification. He worked as a sailor at least twice in the region of Odesa, between 1825 and 1833

In 1830 and in 1870, two distinct migrations arrived in Kerch from the cities of Trani, Bisceglie and Molfetta. These migrants were peasants and sailors, attracted by the job opportunities in the local Crimean seaports and by the possibility to cultivate the nearly unexploited and fertile Crimean lands. Italian general and patriot Giuseppe Garibaldi worked as a sailor at least twice in the region of Odesa, between 1825 and 1833. A later wave of Italians came at the beginning of 20th century, invited by Imperial Russian authorities to develop agricultural activities, mainly grape cultivation. Some sources affirm that at the end of the 18th century, 10 percent of the population of Odesa was Italian.

Italians quickly settled into local society and the community expanded rapidly. Kerch had 13,106 inhabitants in 1855 and around 30,000 in 1870. In 1884, more than 1,000 people lived in the Italian colony, most of whom came from the Adriatic coast and were engaged in coastal shipping or earned their living as sailors and landowners of real estate. In Kerch, the Italians of Crimea built a Roman Catholic church, still known locally as the Church of the Italians. From Kerch, the Italians moved to Feodosiya (the former Genoese colony of Caffa), Simferopol, Mariupol and to other Imperial Russian seaports of the Black Sea, such as Batumi and Novorossiysk.

Soon Italians in Kerch were able to improve their standard of living, purchasing new land and boats and opening small businesses. Some moved to Kafa, Simferopol, Odessa, Mykolaiv, Mariupol, Berdyansk and some other Black Sea ports, such as Batumi and Novorossiysk. In 1870 there was another wave of emigration from Apulia to Kerch. They were relatives and acquaintances of the emigrants of 1820 attracted by advantageous offers of land which the tsar sold at a good price, after which the agricultural population of Kerch prevailed. After 1870, emigration stopped and many of those who had created a fortune returned to Italy. According to an 1897 census, 1.8 percent of the population of the Kerch province was Italian, and rose to 2 percent in 1921, corresponding to a population of approximately 2,000 people.

=== 20th century ===
In 1914, when World War I broke out, the Italian community was numerous enough to have a primary school and a library. The local newspaper at that time, Kerčenskij Rabočij, used to publish articles in Italian.

==== Repression ====
With the October Revolution of 1917, where the Russian Empire became the Soviet Union, a bitter period began for minorities in Russia. Italians of Crimea therefore faced much repression. The political situation in the Black Sea region had been unstable for years. Some Italians, especially wealthy farmers who had retained their original citizenship, decided to return to Italy.

The Kingdom of Italy suspended diplomatic relations with Russia and recalled the Italians residing in the country; so did the Italians of Kerch. On 18 March 1918, the Italian royal agent of Kafa informed the minister that the return migration had to be stopped due to the military invasion of Odesa by troops of the German Empire and Austria-Hungary (Operation Faustschlag).

The Italian military mission communicates that it has been decided that no amnesty will be granted to citizens guilty of desertion during the ongoing war.

In 1919, during the Russian Civil War, two Italian cruisers docked at Sevastopol, carrying a total of 100–150 Italians on board, most from Crimea. Pyotr Wrangel, general of the White Army, helped approximately 150,000 people escape to Constantinople between April and November 1920. Among them were numerous Italian families from Kerch, some of whom had to wait up to two years to obtain permission to enter Italy due to bureaucratic problems.

==== Collectivization ====
Of the approximately 2,000 people of Italian origin living in Kerch in 1922, 650 were "subjects of the Kingdom of Italy". Those who had first taken Tsarist Russian and then Soviet citizenship were those who, as foreigners, could not work in the military or merchant navy under Article 48 of the Merchant Navy Code. Italians from Kerch were members of the Italian Communist Party through the Emigration Committee starting in the early 1920s.

Between 1920 and 1930, many anti-fascist Italians seeking asylum in Soviet Union were sent from Moscow to Kerch to organise the local Italian community. Italian anti-fascists who fled to the USSR in the early 1920s were sent to Kerch to "re-educate" the Italian minority living there. They infiltrated the community, gave standard Italian language lessons, carried out anti-fascist propaganda and reported to the NKVD. Italian teachers were fired by school authorities for being incompetent in educating children in the USSR and were exchanged for Moscow staff oriented towards party guidelines.

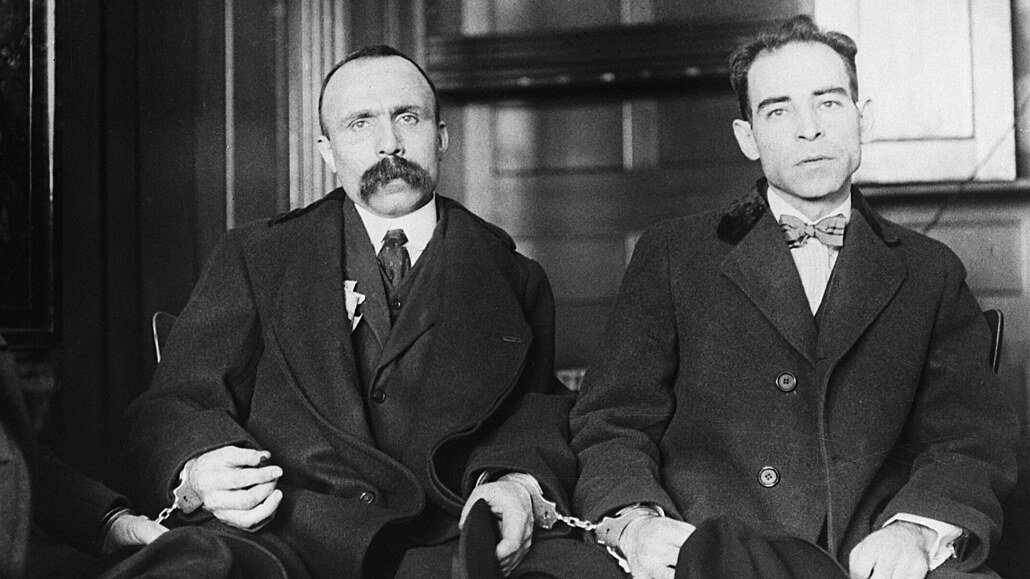
Sacco e Vanzetti

On the initiative of the former Italian communist deputy Anselmo Marabini, in 1924, according to the plans of Soviet collective farming, the Italians were forced to create a kolkhoz, named Sacco e Vanzetti for the two Italian anarchists of the same name. The initiative received the full support of the Soviet authorities, but encountered strong resistance, especially among wealthy Italians in Kerch. Those refusing to comply were forced to leave or were deported. According to 1933 census, the number of Italians in the region of Kerch had already dropped by 1.3 percent.

In connection with forced collectivization (1930–1933), 16 collective farms were founded in Crimea by 16 different ethnic minorities. The largest collective farm was the Armenian one, followed by the Italian one with 870 hectares of land and a herd of 80 cows, 200 sheep and pigs and a dozen horses.

==== Persecution ====
More than half of Kerch's Italians opposed the move to hand over their land to the collective farm, and those who could, fled and tried to return to Italy. Those who remained lost the right to vote as a "socially alien element", as a person hostile to the party and the Soviet state, or as "exploiters", such as entrepreneurs, traders and wealthy farmers (kulaks), and were labeled "Lishenzy" (stigmatized people without rights). The loss of the right to vote meant, in addition to the loss of one's job, exclusion from trade unions and cooperatives, which in turn made it impossible to obtain bread cards, the loss of social housing and, in some cases, after the introduction of season tickets in the 1930s, expulsion from large cities. The "Lishenzy" were also subject to individual taxes at increased rates, to the point of being unable to study or join the army. In the 1920s, 51 Italians from Kerch were included in the list of "Lischentsy".

[...] The Lishenzys are Soviet citizens who have lost the right to vote and with it almost all other rights, including those to the bread pass and to living space, because, according to investigations by the very strict authorities, they do not belong to the people who work. In Russia, workers include employees of state offices, factory workers and small farmers, the latter only if they cultivate their land independently without using paid labor. All other sectors of the population, such as small traders, owners of small workshops or people who do not carry out any activity, are considered "non-class elements" and treated accordingly.

Between 1936 and 1938, during Joseph Stalin's Great Purge, many Italians were accused of espionage and were arrested, tortured, deported or executed. In particular, 204 Italians were accused of spying for Italy and counter-revolutionary activity, arrested, tortured and summarily sentenced to years of forced labor in the gulags of Kazakhstan and Siberia, where most were exposed to cold, hunger and succumbed to fatigue. 105 Italians were sentenced to death by firing squad; 26 in 1937 and 79 in 1938. Many of their bodies lie in the mass graves of Butowo or Kommunarka. 29 Italians were shot in Butowo and eight in Kommunarka. Dante Corneli, Italian writer and anti-fascist, who fled to the USSR in 1922 and then spent 24 years in the Vorkutlag labor camp, spoke of over 2,000 Italian victims of the Kerch agricultural collective farm. In 1939, more Italians fled once their Italian citizenship was at risk of being lost, after the Soviet Union imposed its own citizenship onto those of foreign origin. After this, 1,100 Italians were left in Kerch and smaller amounts in other communities.

In the 1930s, many of the "Lischenzy" were arrested and sentenced to three years of exile in the so-called Specposëlki ("special settlements") in Kazakhstan and Siberia. According to a 1933 census, the population of Italian origin in the Kerch province had decreased to 1.3 percent, which corresponded to a population of approximately 1,320 people, approximately 750 people less than in 1921, compared to the 1933 census.

In the 1930s, the number of requests from Italians and people of Italian origin living in southern Russia to the Italian embassy in Odessa increased. They asked for help to return to Italy, their ancestral homeland, or for intervention to obtain a residence permit, which was denied by the Soviet authorities. The requests for repatriation were much higher than the forecasts of the consul general of Odessa, who reported repression, searches, seizures, arrests and deportations of Italians during collectivization. While some managed to return to their homeland, others were expelled by the Soviet authorities as Italian citizens.

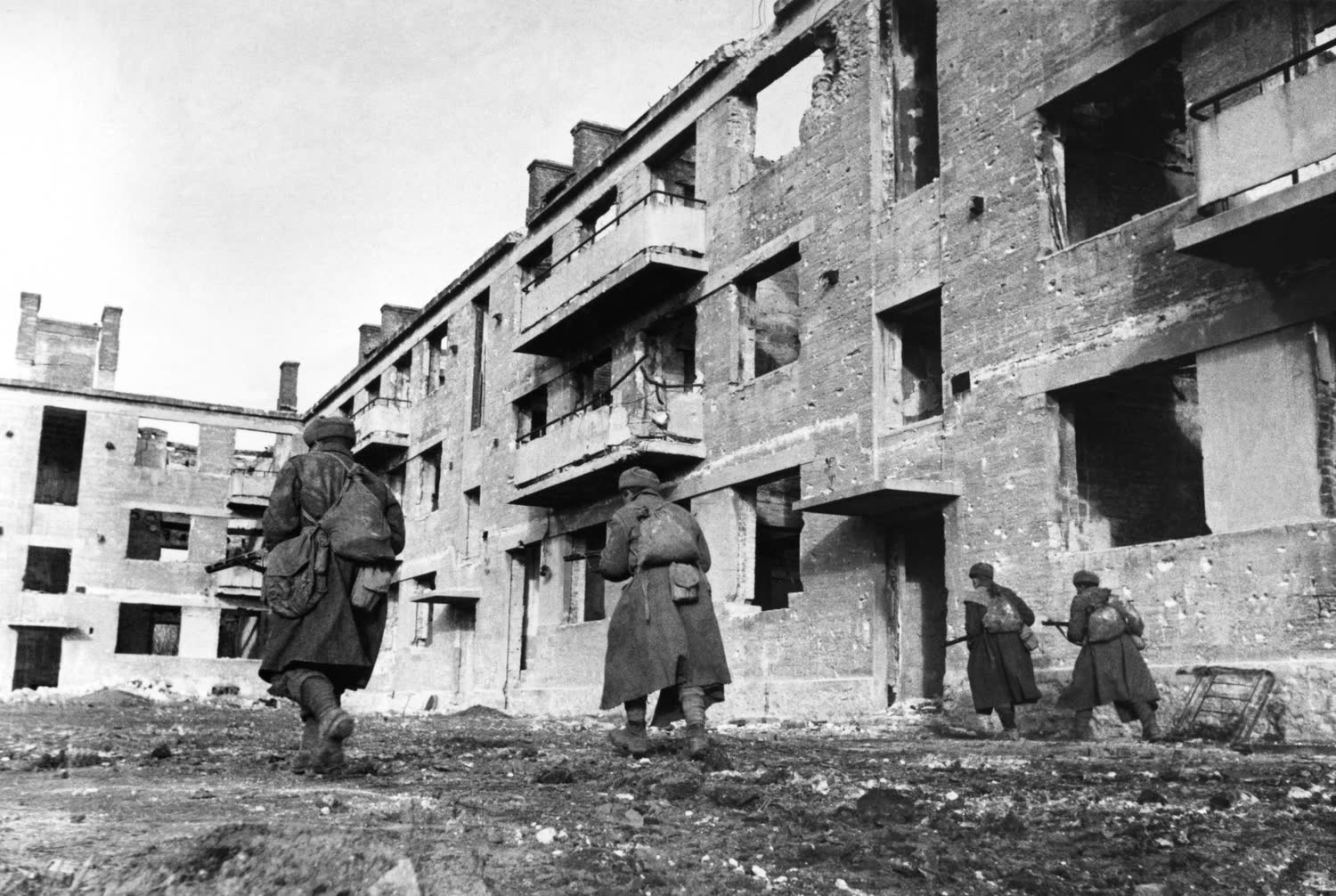
Kerch in 1944 during World War II

With the outbreak of World War II and the invasion of the Soviet Union by the Wehrmacht in June 1941, the population of Italian origin residing there was declared an enemy of the people and, on the basis of a census carried out by the German Wehrmacht, was deported to Kazakhstan and Siberia in three waves of deportations for alleged collaboration with the enemy "for their own security".

Italian woman, come out! You have two hours to prepare for the trip. You are subject to deportation from the city! Italy fights on the side of Germany, so all Italians are subject to deportation.

The sources do not agree on the number of deportees. According to estimates, the Italians of Kerch were no less than 2,000. The first and most extensive deportation took place between 28 and 29 January 1942, and those who escaped the first incursion were deported from 8 to 10 February 1942 (72 people). The few remaining families (less than 10) were deported on 24 June 1944, after the second reconquest by the Red Army. While the first two groups were deported to Kazakhstan, the third and final group was deported to Siberia.

Bartolomeo Evangelista, accused by the Soviet authorities of having continued to carry out his duties as chief engineer at the Kerch dry dock during the German occupation of the city, reported:

On the night of 29 January 1942 I was taken from the pre-trial detention cell to Major Khvatov, head of the NKVD of the city of Kerch. He turned to me and said: "Bartholomej, I remember your father from when we ran around without pants. Now go to Kamysh-Burun, where all the Italians from Kerch have gathered. They will send you to the East and you will remember one thing: an eye for an eye, a tooth for a tooth." [...]

Most of the children and elderly people deported to the Russian Far East died from fatigue, cold, hunger and disease during a week-long journey. The bodies were abandoned in the few stations where the trains stopped.

[...] My two children (aged two and five) died like everyone else from typhus and pneumonia. [...] I left one of them at the Kartaly train station; I brought the other one with me. [...]"

[...] During this “journey” two of my sister Lina's four children died and I left them at the medical assistance points of the train stations, the first at Kartaly station, the second I don't remember where. Our family consisted of eleven people: my mother, my uncle, my grandmother, my sister, my wife, me and five children. In September 1942, after six months, there were only six of us left: my mother, my sister, my wife, myself and my sister's eldest daughter. In other families the situation was no better. In the Simone family, out of seven people, only two remain. In aunt De Martino's family, out of 5 people, only two etc. [...]"

On the territory of the Russian Far East of the complex there were 15 camps, where more than 90,000 people were housed: Germans, Italians, Hungarians, Romanians, Poles, Finns, etc., some of whom were under construction of the metallurgical combine, as some were used in mining and in the construction of roads and houses.

After their arrival, all deportees were registered at the military command office. The passport was removed and stamped Spezposelenie (Special Settlement). It was forbidden to move freely outside the respective village without permission from the military administration. Furthermore, the deportees had to report to the military command once a month.

However, not only Italians were deported, but also Italian anti-fascists who fled Italy in the 1920s and had found refuge in the Soviet Union. The Italian embassy in Moscow was interested in the Italian citizens interned in Camp 99 in Karaganda since 1941. Some of them were released, expelled and deported to Italy.

The few survivors were allowed to return to Kerch in the 1950s and 1960s during Nikita Khrushchev's administration. There they discovered that they had lost everything and could no longer return to their previous homes. Many could no longer prove that they were of Italian origin because their documents had been confiscated at the time of deportation.

[...] When we managed to return to Kerch after years, our houses were occupied by strangers and we have no rights. Even the cemetery land, which was once purchased by our great-grandfather, is occupied by other people's graves. [...]"

Some families remained in Chelyabinsk, other places in the Urals, Kazakhstan, Uzbekistan, Kuban, Komi Republic and Saratov. In 1993, 365 people of Italian origin still lived in Kazakhstan. Officially, 1,028 Italians died in these deportations; half belonged to the municipality of Kerch. The others were Italian anti-fascists who had emigrated, especially communist activists.

== Italians of Crimea today ==
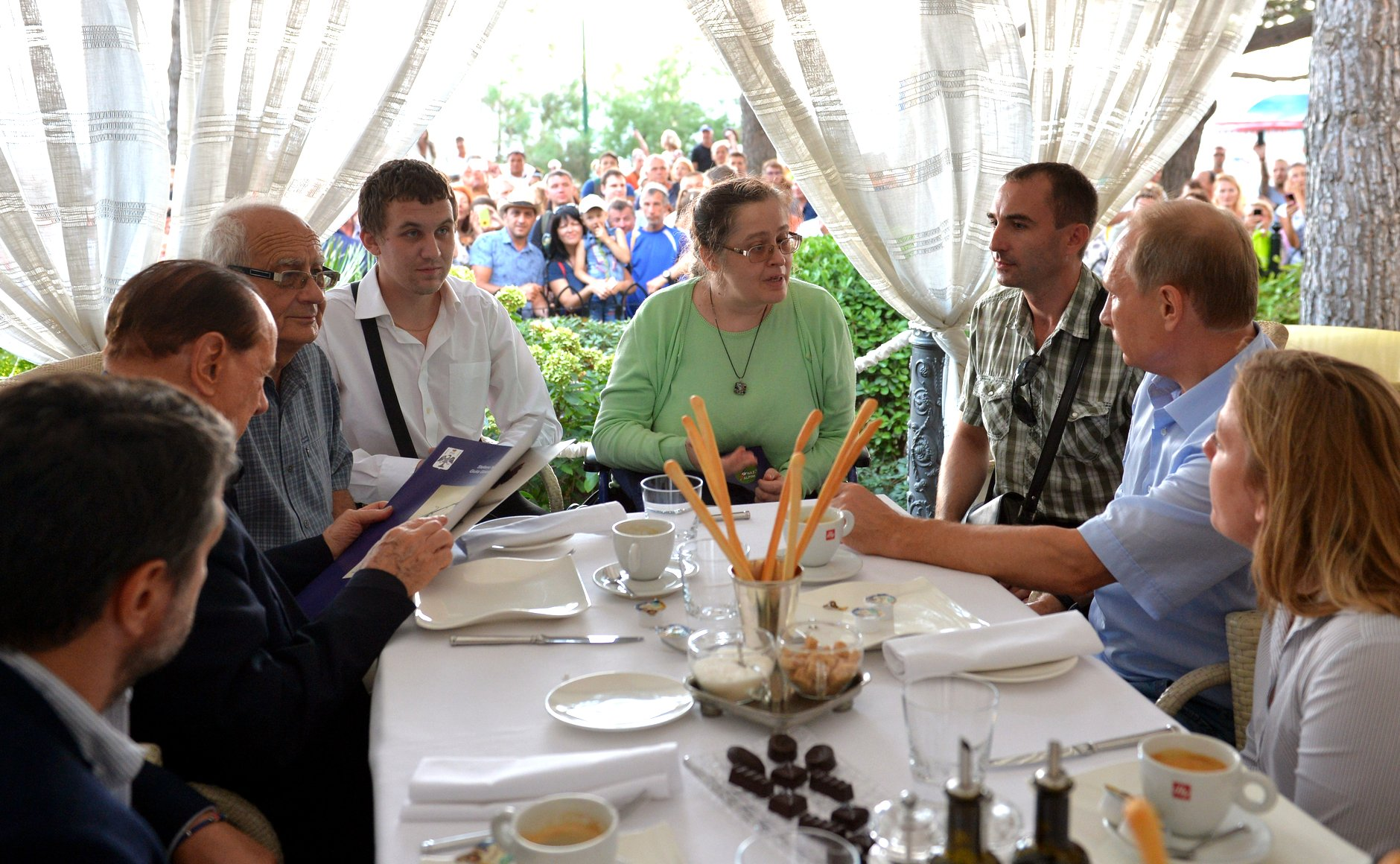
Meeting of Vladimir Putin and Silvio Berlusconi with members of the Crimean Italian community in Yalta, September 2015

On 26 April 1991, the Supreme Soviet approved Law No. 1107-1 "On the rehabilitation of repressed peoples". This document specifically identified 20 nationalities and "others" for rehabilitation.

After the collapse of the Soviet Union and the assignment of the territory to Ukraine, the parliament of the Crimean Autonomous Soviet Socialist Republic adopted the Soviet resolution in 1992 and recognized the deported local ethnic minorities of Tatars, Germans, Greeks, Armenians and Bulgarians. In Kerch, the "Monument against cruelty and violence" was erected, which lists the five nationalities. Italians, whom the Soviets considered "others", had not been recognized as a deported ethnic group. Economic benefits are associated with this recognition. These include increases in pensions, discounts on medicines and transport, exemption from school fees, free colonies for children and economic support for the return to Crimea for those still living in the places of deportation.

From 1992 to 1997, the Italian Embassy in Ukraine received 47 applications for Italian citizenship, of which only two were successful. Very few members of the Italian community in Crimea today have adequate documentation as their belongings, along with their passports, were confiscated upon deportation. After returning to Crimea, many hid their ethnic origins and received Russification of their names. The descendants of the surviving Italians of Crimea today account for 300 people, mainly residing in Kerch.

On 28 July 2008, under the presidency of Giulia Giacchetti Boico, the association CERKIO (Community of Emigrants in the Region of Krimea - Italians of Origin) was founded. Every year, on 29 January survivors and descendants of the Italian community gather on the Kerch pier for a ceremony in memory of the victims of the mass deportation of Italians in 1942.

On 12 September 2015, a delegation of the 'Cerkio' association (an organization that represents ethnic Italians in Crimea) led by its president, Giulia Giacchetti Boico, and Silvio Berlusconi met Vladimir Putin in Yalta. Following this meeting, the Russian president issued a decree recognizing the plight of Crimean Italians during the Stalinist regime.
