= Victor Vaziulin =

Soviet and Russian philosopher (1932–2012)

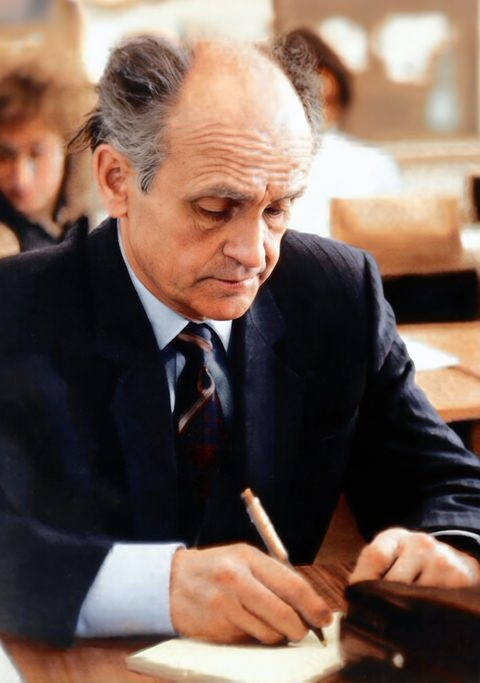
- Born: 30 August 1932 near Zvenigorod, Moscow Oblast, Russian SFSR
- Died: 8 January 2012 (aged 79); Moscow, Russia

Philosophical work
- Era: Contemporary philosophy
- Region: Russian philosophy
- School: Marxism
- Main interests: Marxism · Epistemology · Dialectics · Philosophy of history · Ethics · Marx's method
- Notable ideas: Society as an organic whole · Necessary fallacies in the development of scientific knowledgee · International Logical-Historical School

Victor Alekseyevich Vaziulin (Russian: Виктор Алексеевич Вазюлин; 30 August 1932 – 8 January 2012) was a Soviet and Russian philosopher. He became famous for his deep knowledge of Karl Marx's work as well as for further developing Marxism through the dialectical sublation of its acquis.

He is the founder of the International Logical-Historical School.

== Biography ==
V. A. Vaziulin was born near Zvenigorod, Moscow Oblast, and studied philosophy at Lomonosov University (1950–55), defended his PhD thesis at 1964 and his postdoctoral thesis at 1971. In 1964, he became a professor at Lomonosov University, where he taught until his retirement. He also taught at the universities of Bratislava and Prague. He died in Moscow.

== Work ==
V. A. Vaziulin proposed a distinct direction in social theory, dialectical logic and science methodology. The main scientific achievements of V. A. Vaziulin include:

- Revealing the logic of Karl Marx's Capital: Critique of Political Economy theory by a systematic, categorical, comparative evaluation of the Capital's politico-economic material alongside a parallel, critical analysis of Hegel’s The Science of Logic. This comparative cross-examination enabled him to explore the methodology of the advanced scientific research, of the mature science as an organic whole. Within the framework of this logic and methodology are revealed- in "pure form"- i) the ascent from the abstract to the concrete in its dialectical unity with the ascent from the sensual-concrete to the abstract, ii) the logical in its unity with the historical and, iii) the reasonable aspect of thinking (German: Vernunft) in unity with the intellectual (germ. Verstand).
- A concrete-historical approach of Marxism as a scientific system that is developed through the emergence and resolution of necessary contradictions. For Vaziulin, Marxism is a scientific system that consists of internally united, in their differences, components, each of which is at a certain level of its formation and development. This logical and methodological analysis of the history of Marxism paved the way for i) the discovery of the objective laws and contradictions (including the necessary fallacies) of the beginning, the emergence, the formation, and the maturity of the development of scientific research, i.e. the movement of cognitive thinking from the surface to the essence of the object (of the subject matter) and, ii) the development of the most promising components of Marxism.
- Revealing the inner, systematic interconnection of laws and categories of social theory which reflect the structure of the mature society and outlined the theoretical periodization of human history (the objective laws of its "ascent" from the beginning, the emergence, the formation, to the maturity) from the perspective of the interactions of natural and social factors.

The first two achievements are internally connected to the approach of scientific thinking as a natural-historical process.

== Bibliography ==
In Russian

- Логика «Капитала» К.Маркса, Москва 1968, 2002.
- Становление метода научного исследования К.Маркса (логический аспект), Москва 1975, 2017
- Диалектика исторического процесса и методология его исследования, Москва 1978, 2007
- Логика истории. Вопросы теории и методологии, Москва 1988, 2005, 2016.

In German

- W.A. Wasjulin: Das Historische und das Logische in der Methodologie von Karl Marx, in: Internationale Marx-Engels-Foruschung (Marxistische Studien. Jahrbuch des IMSF 12), Frankfurt/M 1987, S. 238–244
- V.A. Vazjulin: Nach dem Sieg der Konterrevolution – den welthistorischen Übergang zum Kommunismus denken. Gespräch in Moskau, 1992 geführt von Gudrun Havemann, Wladimir Koschel und Manolis Dafermakis in Moskau, veröff. in Zeitschrift Marxistische Erneuerung – Z. – Nr. 14, Juni 1993
- V.A.Vazjulin: Das System der Logik G.W.F.Hegels und das System der Logik des «Kapitals» von Karl Marx»
- V.A. Vazjulin: Entwicklung systematisch denken, in: Deutsche Zeitschrift für Philosophie 2005/2, S. 203–218
- V.A. Vazjulin: Die Logik des «Kapitals» von Karl Marx, Books on Demand GmbH, Norderstedt 2006
- V.A. Vazjulin: Die Logik der Geschichte, Books on Demand GmbH, Norderstedt 2011

In Greek

- Η διαλεκτική του ιστορικού προτσές και η μεθοδολογία της έρευνάς του. «Σύγχρονη εποχή», Αθ. 1988.
- Η λογική της ιστορίας. Εισαγωγή-Μετάφρ.-Σχόλια Δημήτρης Πατέλης. «Ελληνικά γράμματα», Αθ. 2004, 2η έκδ. ΚΨΜ, Αθ. 2013.

== Sources ==
- Moscow State University web-page
- Short biography (in Russian)
- Marx's Global Reception Today - Marx in Russia
- The Logic of Capital: Some recent analyses
- Recent Soviet works on the scientific method of Marx's Capital and related topics
- Marx worldwide : on the development of the international discourse on Marx since 1965
- M. Dafermos (2021). Rethinking the relationship between Marx's Capital and Hegel's Science of Logic: The tradition of creative Soviet Marxism. Capital & Class.
- M.Dafermos (2025). Dialectics as mode of thought and method in history. Springer.
