= United Communist Party =

United Communist Party Объединенная коммунистическая партия
- Abbreviation: UCP (English); ОКП (Russian)
- First Secretary: Vladimir Lakeev
- Founded: 15 March 2014; 11 years ago
- Split from: Communist Party of the Russian Federation
- Headquarters: 7th building, Abel'manovskaya Street; Moscow, Russia 109147
- Newspaper: New Alternative
- Youth wing: Communist Youth Union of the Russian Federation
- Membership: 1,500
- Ideology: Communism; Marxism–Leninism
- Political position: Far-left
- Colours: Red
- Slogan: "Workers of the world, unite!" (Russian: "Пролетарии всех стран, соединяйтесь!")
- Seats in the State Duma: 0 / 450
- Seats in the Regional Parliaments: 0 / 3,994

Party flag

Website
- redstarnews.org/2021/12/15/destruction-of-the-soviet-union-a-crime-without-statute-of-limitations/

The United Communist Party (UCP; Russian: Объединённая коммунистическая партия; ОКП; Ob'yedinonnaya kommunisticheskaya partiya, OKP) is a communist party in Russia created at the founding congress in Moscow on 15 March 2014.

== The founding congress ==
In March 2014, 91 delegates, including 28 women, from 46 Russian regions participated in the Congress. The average age of the Congress delegates was 40 years old with the youngest delegate born in 1996. The Congress delegates included members of the Interregional Association of the Communists, the Left Front, the Revolutionary Workers' Party, the Russian Communist Party, the Communist Party, the Union of Communist Youth, a number of free trade unions and other left-wing organizations and non-partisans.

The Congress approved the program, Charter, and party symbols of the UCP. It also elected the Central Committee and the Central Auditing Commission. Vladimir Lakeev (Moscow) was elected First Secretary of the Central Committee of the UCP.

"Creating the UCP reflected the need for organizational unification of all who stand in positions of scientific communism in favor of socialism, democracy, internationalism and secularism, the party is not opposed to the other working-class parties, the proletarian movement is not customized for any sectarian principles. The party aims at the development of class consciousness in the masses of workers and the organization of their struggle for power.

The immediate task of the Party is the intensification of the struggle of the working people - the working class and its allies - for their political and economic rights and interests.

The UCP organizes its activities based on the principle of democratic centralism, the party of ideas of community and camaraderie".

== The Second Congress of the UCP ==
The second Congress of the UCP was held in Moscow in November 2016.

== The Third Congress of the United Communist Party ==
The Third Congress of the United Communist Party was held on 9 February 2019 in the city of Moscow, following a decision by the Sixth Plenum of the party's Central Committee.

At the Congress, reports were presented by the Central Committee and the Central Auditing Commission of the UCP. The Congress also discussed amendments to the party's Program and the Charter, and elections were held for new party structures. In addition, The Congress addressed the political situation in the country, the world communist movement, and internal party matters. On the eve of the Congress, a report-election campaign was conducted across all party groups from September–December 2018.

== Expansion ==
The UCP aspires for unity among socialist forces in Russia. In 2018 another left-wing Russian party, New Communist Movement, merged with the UCP.

== Criticism ==
Political analyst Sean Guillory wrote about the radical Left in Russia on the eve of the Russian presidential election in May 2018. In his analysis, he included a range of organizations, including the United Communist Party. Guillory argued that the radical Left in Russia, including the United Communist Party, is constrained by several factors, including state repression, ideological differences (particularly over the Ukrainian issue), a generational divide and a lack of financial resources.

Despite their ambition to create a parallel media that represents “the majority of the Russian population,” Guillory argued that the Russian Left is “resource-poor.”

According to Guillory, there is a clear generational divide within the Russian Left that has a detrimental effect on the United Communist Party. Older parties such as the UCP identify with the Soviet Union, with a membership and support base that tends to be older, even elderly. In contrast, newer groups use much less Soviet Union symbolism and attract younger members and supporters. Young Russians who begin to develop class consciousness and an interest in political affairs are attracted to these newer groups. The failure of older organizations, such as UCP, to attract younger members and supporters has a terminal effect, further accelerating the decline of the older Russian Left organizations.
