= Italian Swedes =

Swedish citizens of Italian descent

Italo-svedesi (Italian) Svenskitalienare (Swedish)
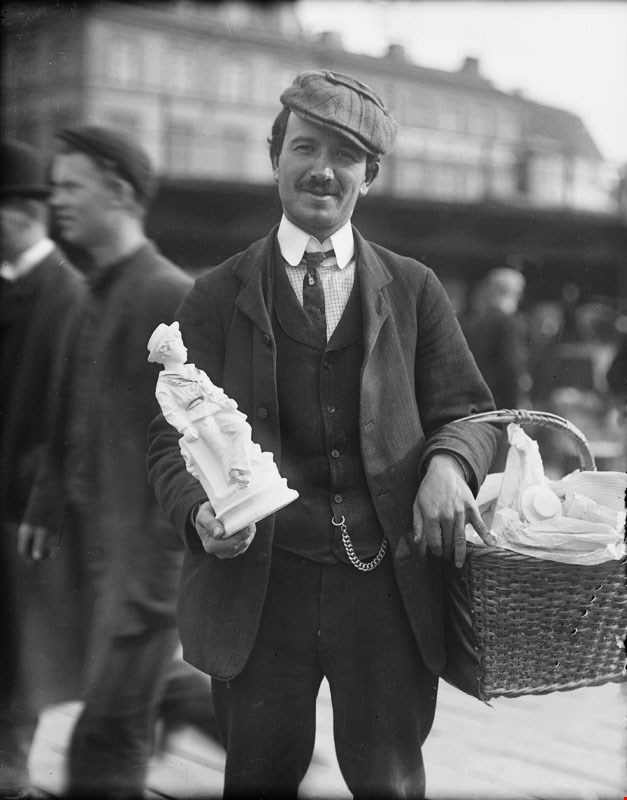
- Italian street vendor selling plaster work in Stockholm early 20th century

Total population
- 19,087 0.2% of the Swedish population (2012)

Regions with significant populations
- Stockholm and Gothenburg

Languages
- Swedish · Italian and Italian dialects

Religion
- Roman Catholicism

Related ethnic groups
- Italians, Italian Belgians, Italian Britons, Italian Finns, Italian French, Italian Germans, Italian Romanians, Italian Spaniards, Italian Swiss, Corfiot Italians, Genoese in Gibraltar, Italians of Crimea, Italians of Odesa

Italian Swedes (Italian: italo-svedesi; Swedish: Svenskitalienare) are Swedish-born citizens who are fully or partially of Italian descent, whose ancestors were Italians who emigrated to Sweden during the Italian diaspora, or Italian-born people in Sweden.

== Italian community ==
As of 2018, there are 8,126 people born in Italy living in Sweden, as well as 10,961 people born in Sweden with at least one parent born in Italy.

== History ==
Italian immigration to Sweden has had several reasons, the most important of which is immigration for work and began in numbers during the second half of the 1940s, but could be traced back as early as the 16th century. Among the Italians who moved to Sweden in the 16th century, is the nobleman Antonio de Palm.

Italian plasterers spread to Sweden in the 17th century, and performed ornamental plaster and stucco work on buildings that required artistic decoration. After the architectural transition to the Baroque and Rococo, the interest in the plasterers' decorations waned, which led to the end of the immigration of this Italian professional group to Sweden.

Sweden's low birth rate during the 1920s and 1930s led the country to recruit abroad, where, among other places, Italian workers spread to the country's major industrial cities. Record years of high labor demand accelerated the increase.

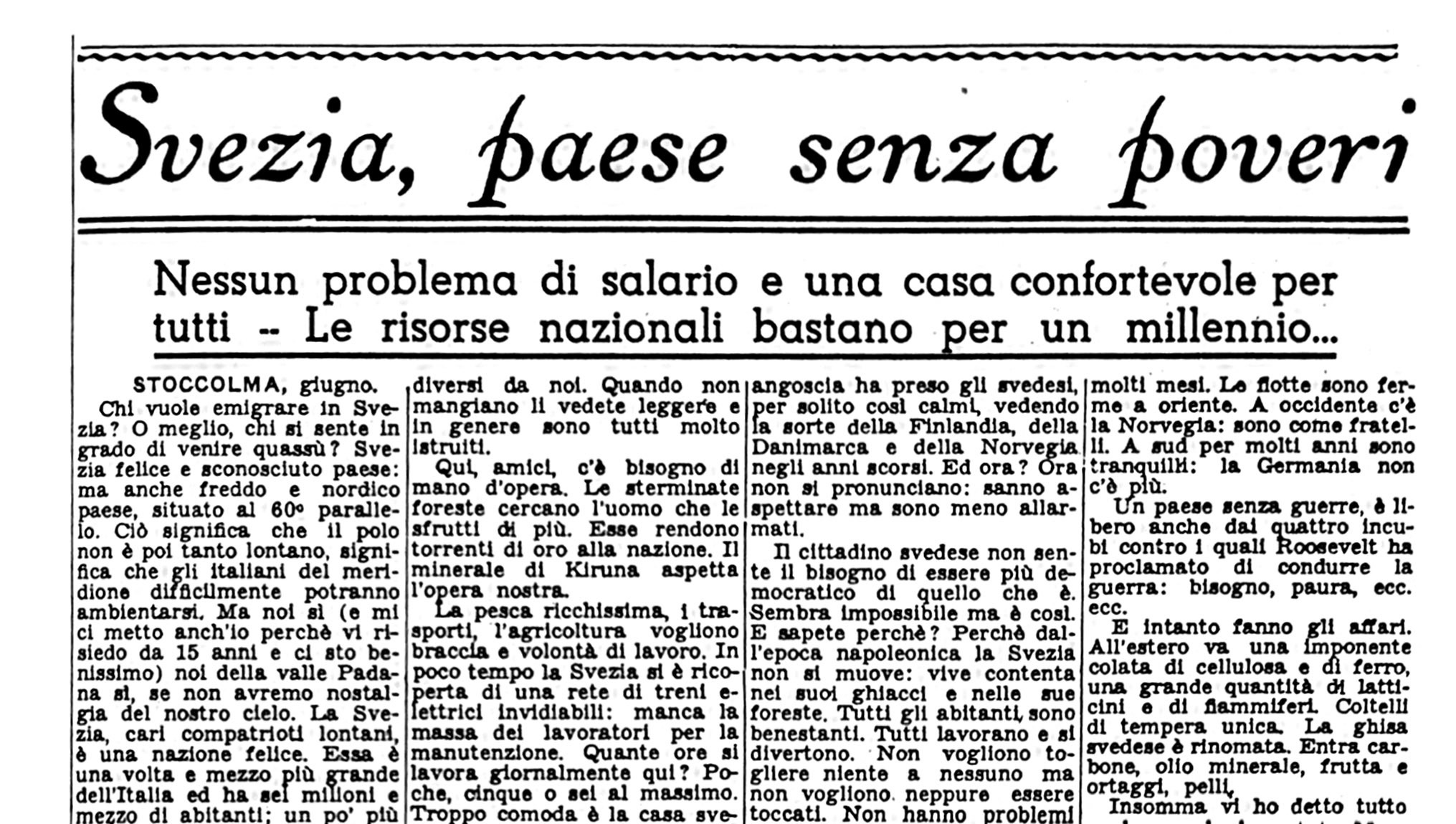
Newspaper clipping from Il Popolo Nuovo of 1946, circulated in Italy, with the article entitled "Svezia, paese senza poveri" ("Sweden, a country without the poor")

In the Italian newspaper "Il Popolo Nuovo", on 11 June 1946, an article was published entitled "Svezia, paese senza poveri" ("Sweden, a country without the poor people"). The article talked about the working, economic and social conditions in Sweden, together with the sacrifices that potential immigrants would have to make.

The organized labor immigration of Italians to Sweden began after World War II, more precisely in 1947. As Swedish industry did not suffer the destructive consequences of the war as a result of the Swedish policy of neutrality during the war, Swedish industries remained in a state of growth, without war-induced obstacles. As the rest of Europe was hit by heavy bombing, much of the financial resources of the affected countries, unlike Sweden, went to rebuilding industries and cities.

Sweden on the other hand concentrated completely on industry and, due to widespread unemployment in post-war Europe, a lot of manpower flowed into Sweden, including many Italians. During this period, Swedish industrialists lobbied the Swedish government to conclude agreements with the Italian government in order to recruit skilled labor from Italy to remedy the labor shortage in the country.

The Swedish and Italian governments officially signed a bilateral agreement in 1947, which referred to the requirements and rights that would apply to Italian immigrants who would be employed by Swedish companies. The agreement was signed by the Italian Mario Tommasini and the Swedish Folke Thunborg on 19 July 1947. The agreement included 17 clauses, which concerned specialized manpower, and referred to the probationary hiring of Italian immigrants for two years.

After the bilateral agreement signed by Italy and Sweden in 1947, in a few months, many Italian workers arrived in Sweden to work at Saab Kockums in Malmö, SKF in Gothenburg and ASEA in Västerås. During the 1950s, hundreds of workers from Turin were recruited for the production of military aircraft at Saab AB in Linköping, especially for the production of the J29 "Tunnan".

The greatest growth in Italian migration to Sweden occurred in the 1950s and 1960s. After the 1973–74 oil crisis, labor immigration to Sweden generally declined, due to the deteriorating economic situation, combined with high unemployment.

The first Italian association in Sweden was established in 1948, and in 1960 the Federation of Italian Associations in Sweden was established.

== Demography ==
=== People born in Italy living in Sweden ===
The age distribution among people born in Italy living in Sweden in 2015 was:

- 0–14 years: 1,245 (11.6%)
- 15–64 years: 7,271 (67.5%)
- Age 65 and over: 2,253 (20.9%)

=== Swedes of Italian descent ===
As of 31 December 2014 there were 7,964 people born in Sweden with an Italian background or ancestry:

- Persons born in Sweden with both parents born in Italy: 932
- Persons born in Sweden with father born in Italy and mother in another foreign country: 1,280
- Persons born in Sweden with mother born in Italy and father in another foreign country: 552
- Persons born in Sweden with father born in Italy and mother in Sweden: 7,196
- Persons born in Sweden with mother born in Italy and father in Sweden: 1,834

== Notable Italian Swedes ==
- Amelia Adamo, editor-in-chief
- Alesso, DJ and producer
- Anna Maria Corazza Bildt, MEP
- Marcus Birro, poet, author and columnist
- Peter Birro, poet, author and columnist
- Lydia Capolicchio, journalist and hostess
- Sandro Cavazza, singer and songwriter
- Johan De Farfalla, musician
- Staffan de Mistura, UN and Arab League envoy to Syria
- Thomas Di Leva, singer-songwriter
- Jonnie Fedel, former football player
- Helena Frith Powell, columnist and author. (Italian mother)
- Claudia Galli, actress
- Erik Gandini, film director
- John Guidetti, football player
- Bianca Ingrosso, blogger, social influencer, entrepreneur, and singer
- Benjamin Ingrosso, singer and songwriter
- Oliver Ingrosso, DJ, music producer and actor
- Sebastian Ingrosso, DJ and producer
- Pauline Kamusewu, singer
- Marzia Kjellberg, Italian YouTuber who moved to Sweden multiple times before moving to UK.
- Yvonne Lombard, actress
- Veronica Maggio, singer
- Angelique Magito, opera singer in the 19th century
- Messiah Marcolin, heavy metal musician
- Michael Nyqvist, actor
- Hilda Petrini, watchmaker in the 19th century
- Andreas Ravelli, former footballer
- Thomas Ravelli, former footballer
- Paolo Roberto, actor and former boxer
- Mauro Scocco, singer
- Marie Taglioni, ballet dancer in the 19th century
- Roberto Vacchi, former cyclist
- Andreas Vinciguerra, former tennis player
- Hans Wahlgren, actor
- Linus Wahlgren, actor
- Pernilla Wahlgren, singer and actress
- Alexandra Zazzi, chef
- Oscar Zia, singer
- Julia Zigiotti Olme, professional footballer

== Gallery ==
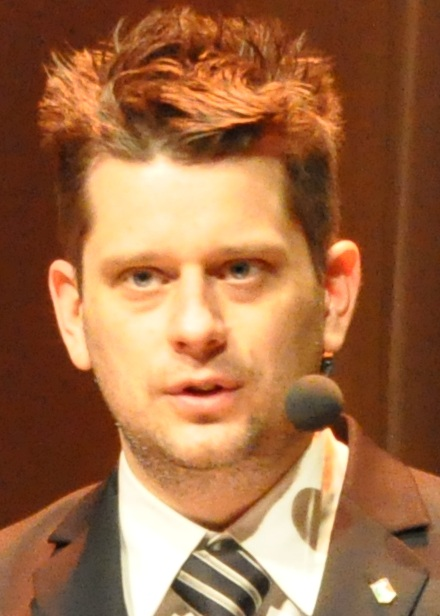
Marcus Birro

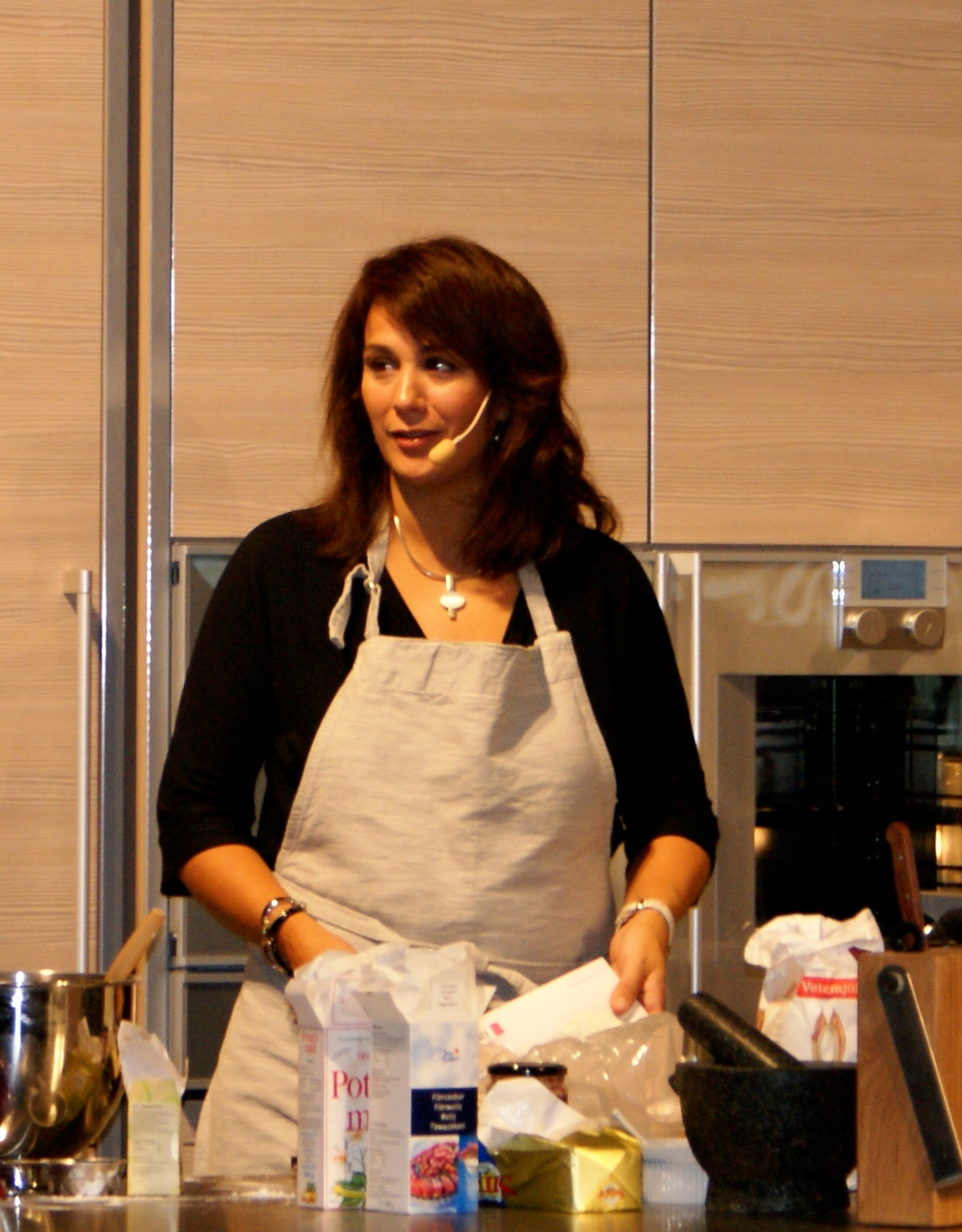
Alexandra Zazzi

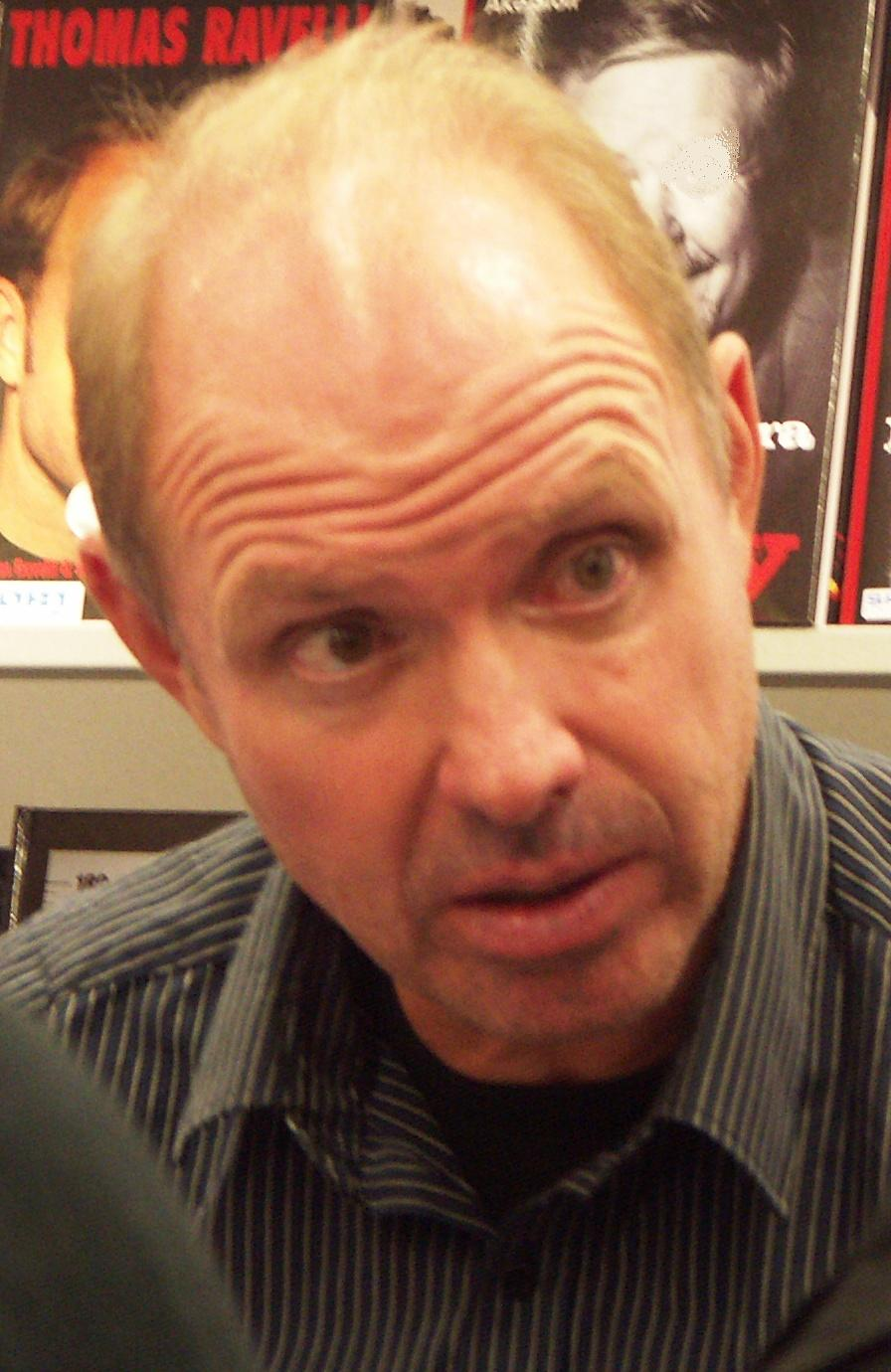
Thomas Ravelli

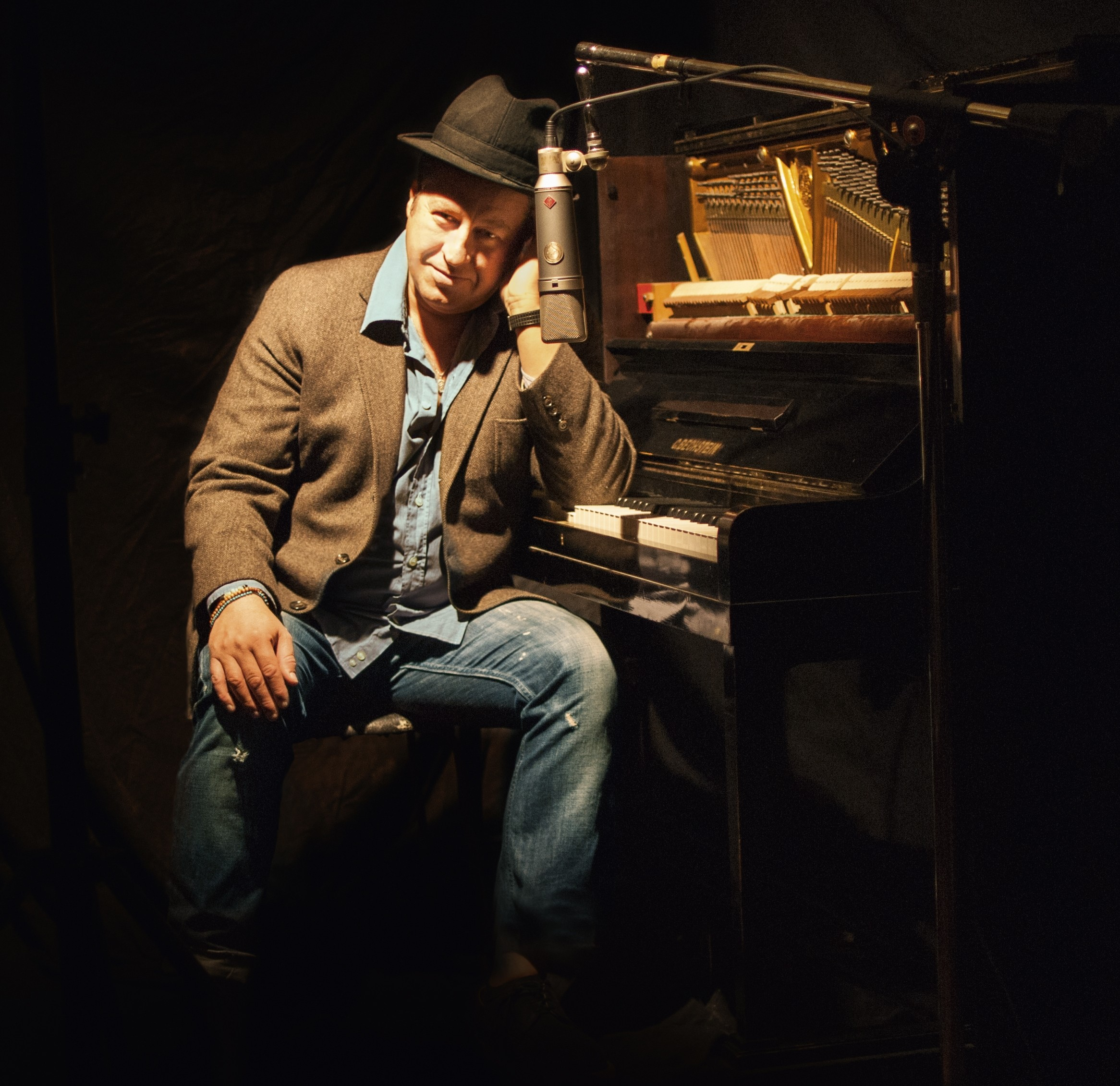
Mauro Scocco

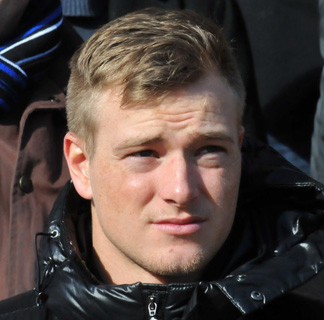
John Guidetti

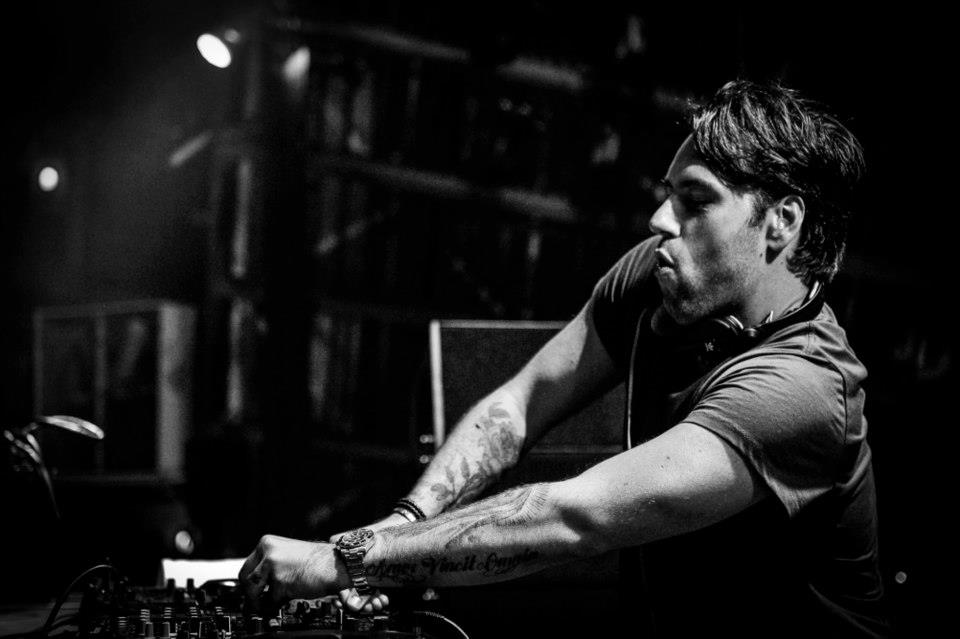
Sebastian Ingrosso

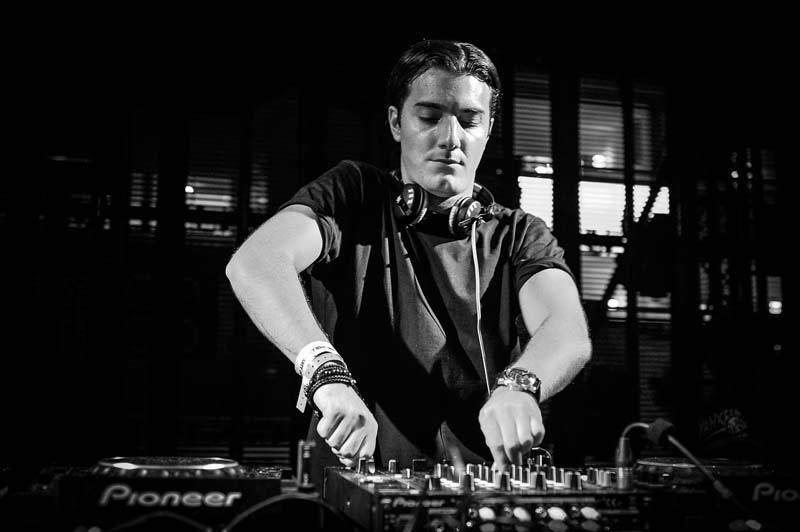
Alesso

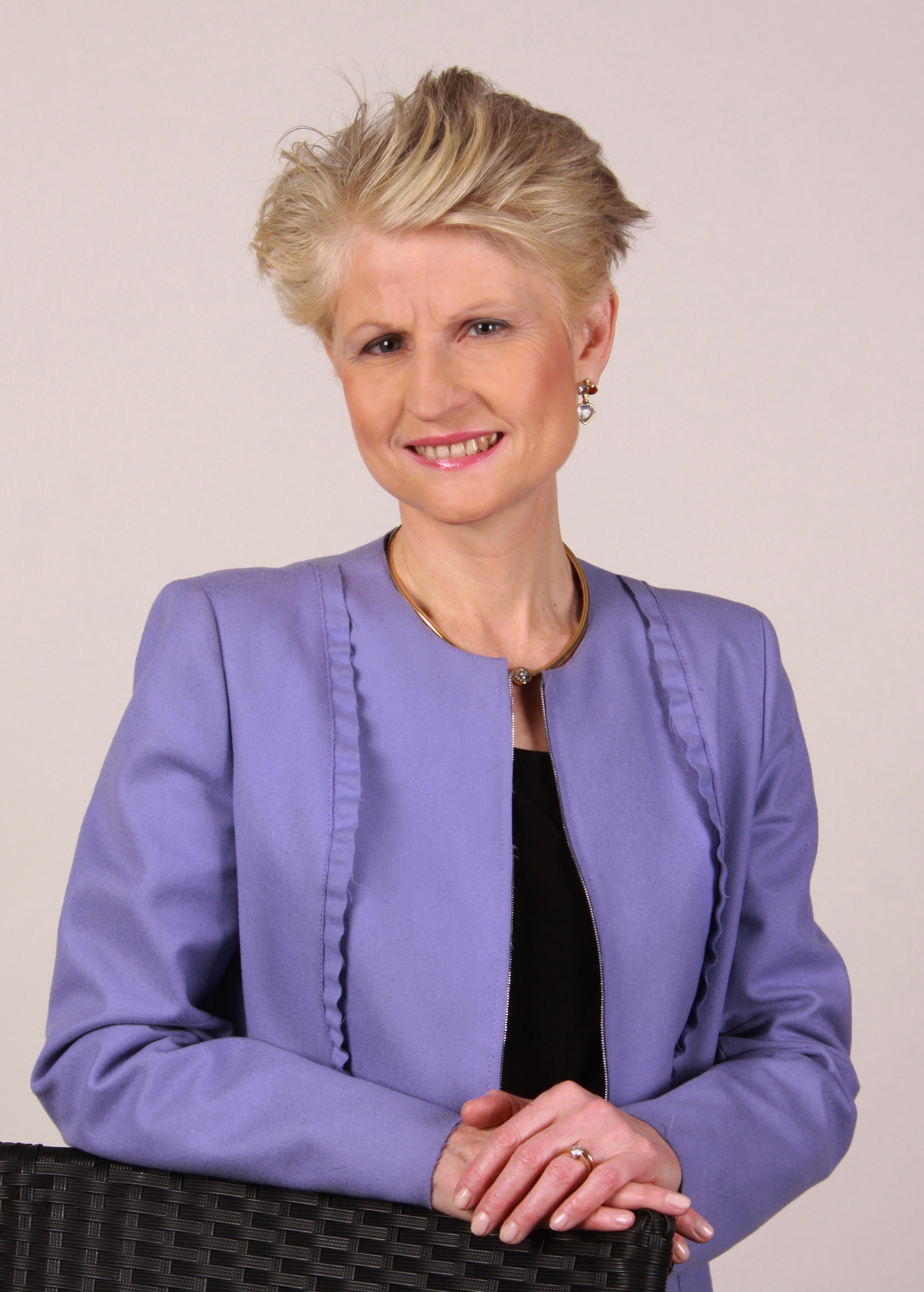
Anna Maria Corazza Bildt

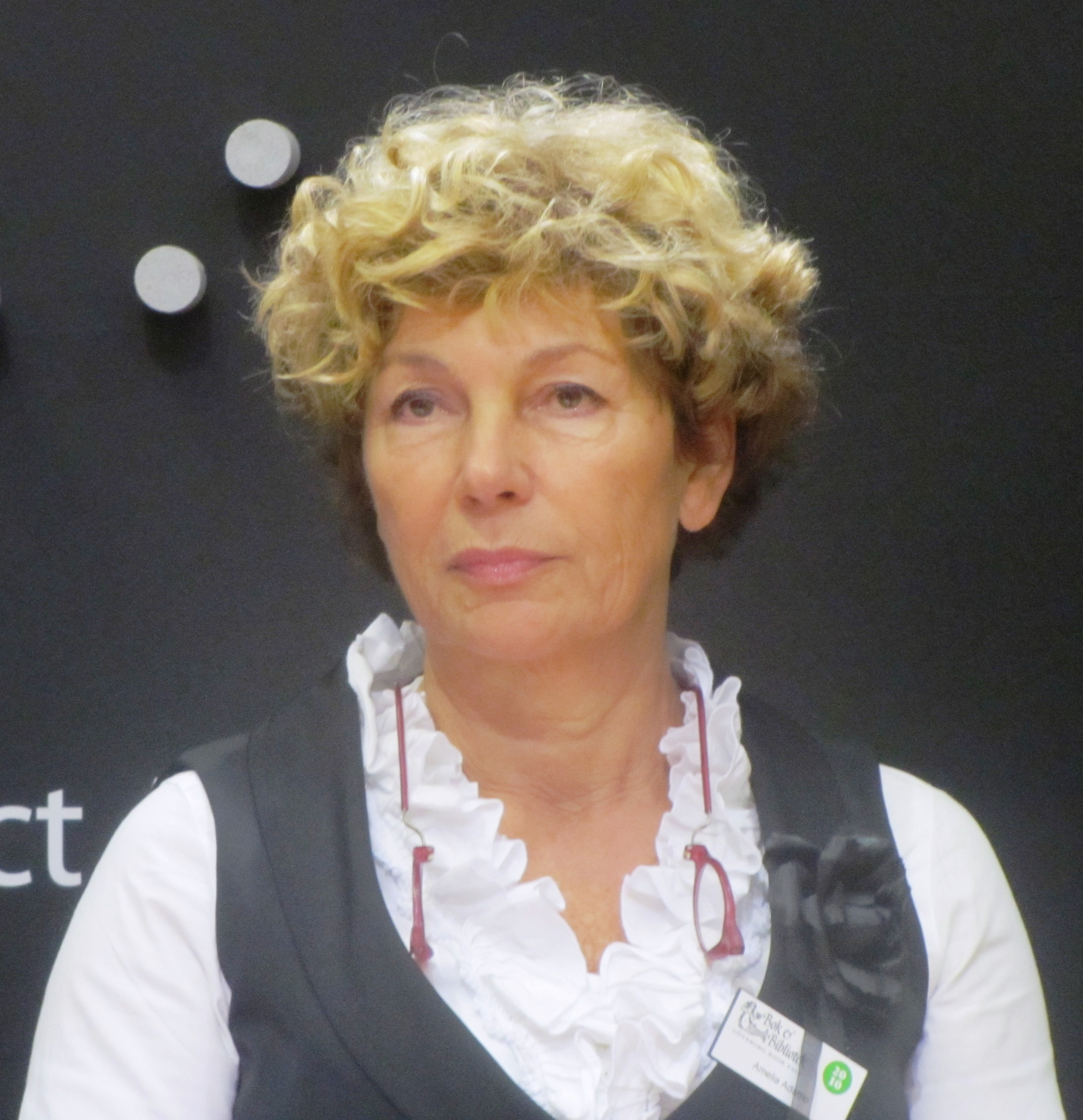
Amelia Adamo

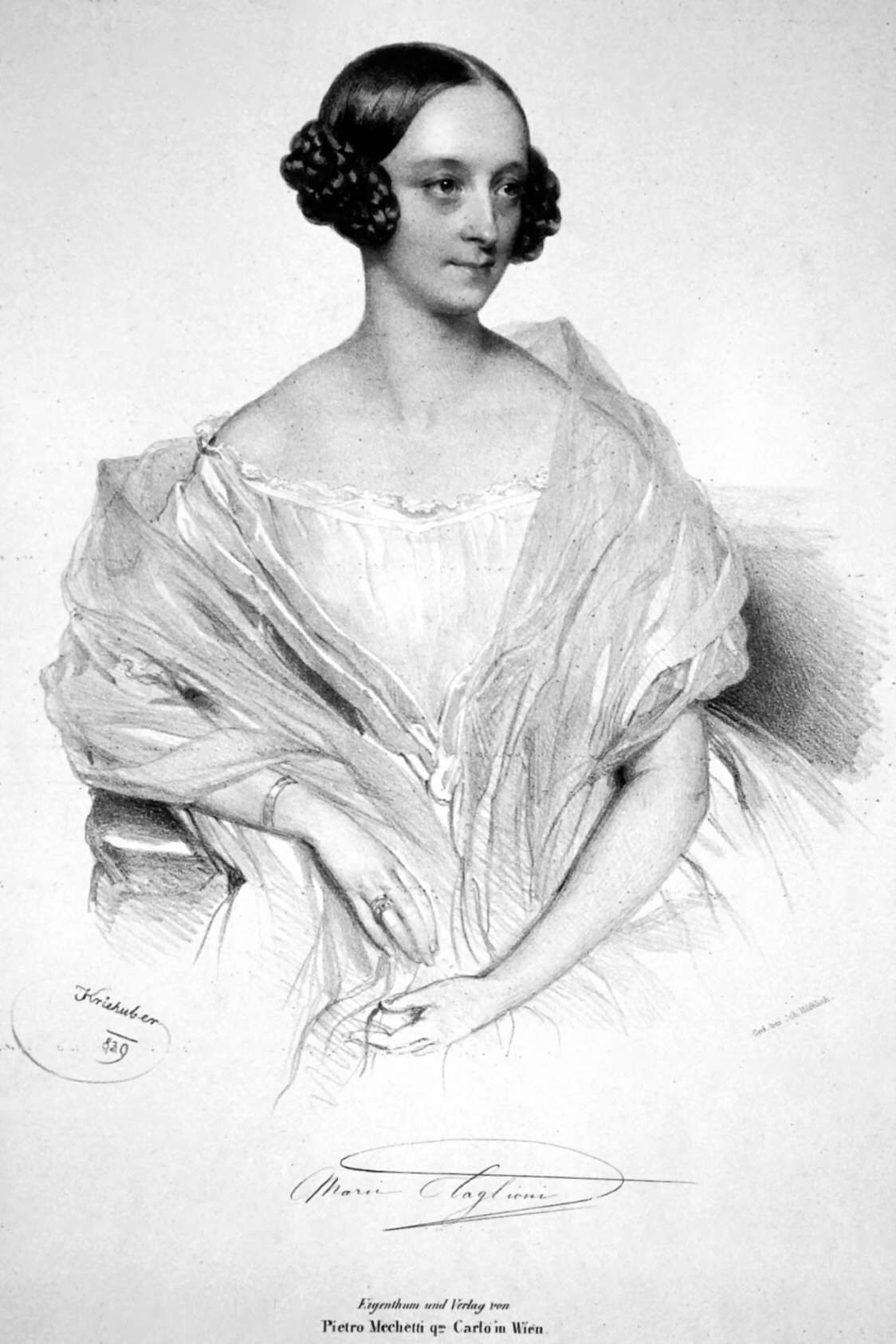
Marie Taglioni

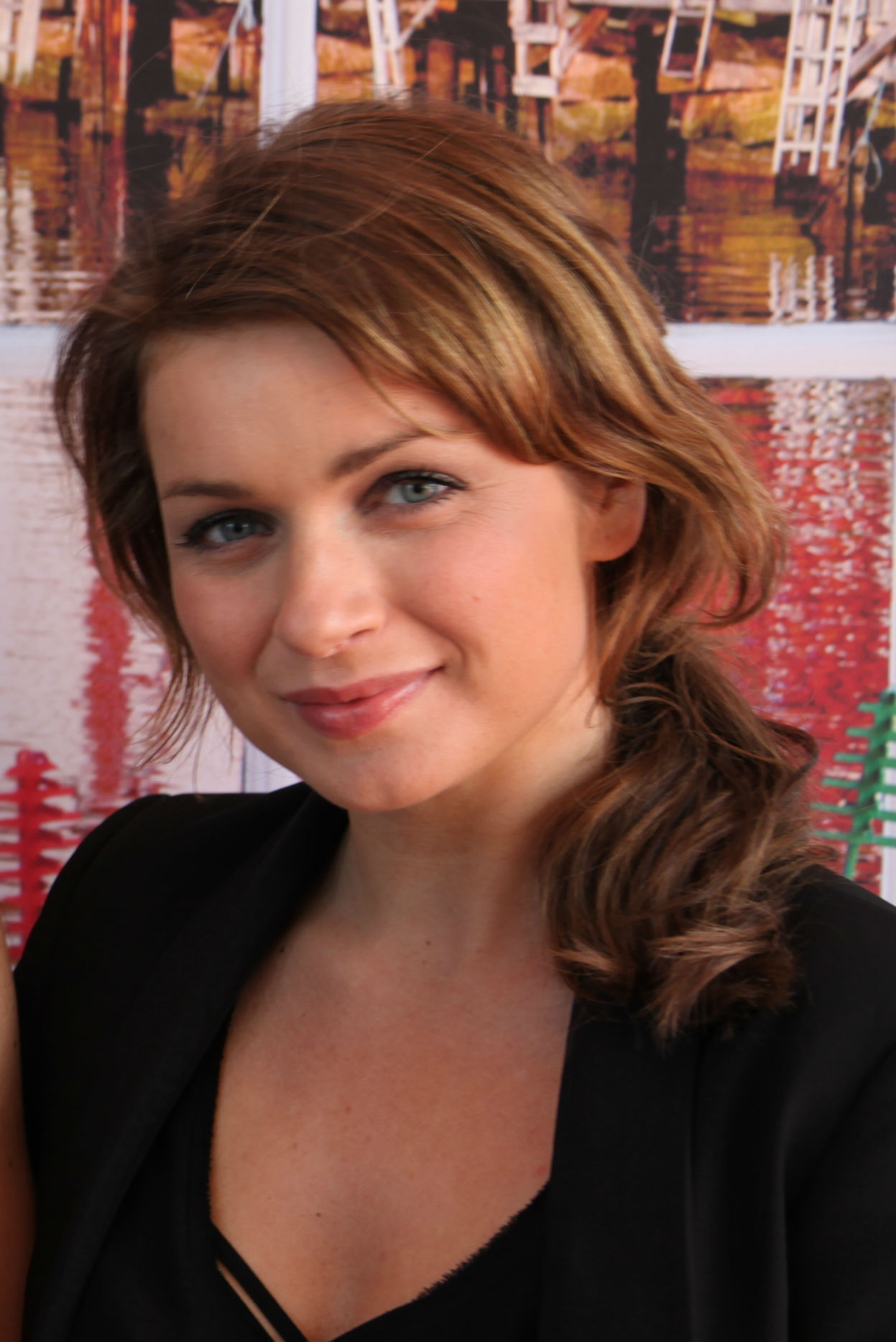
Claudia Galli

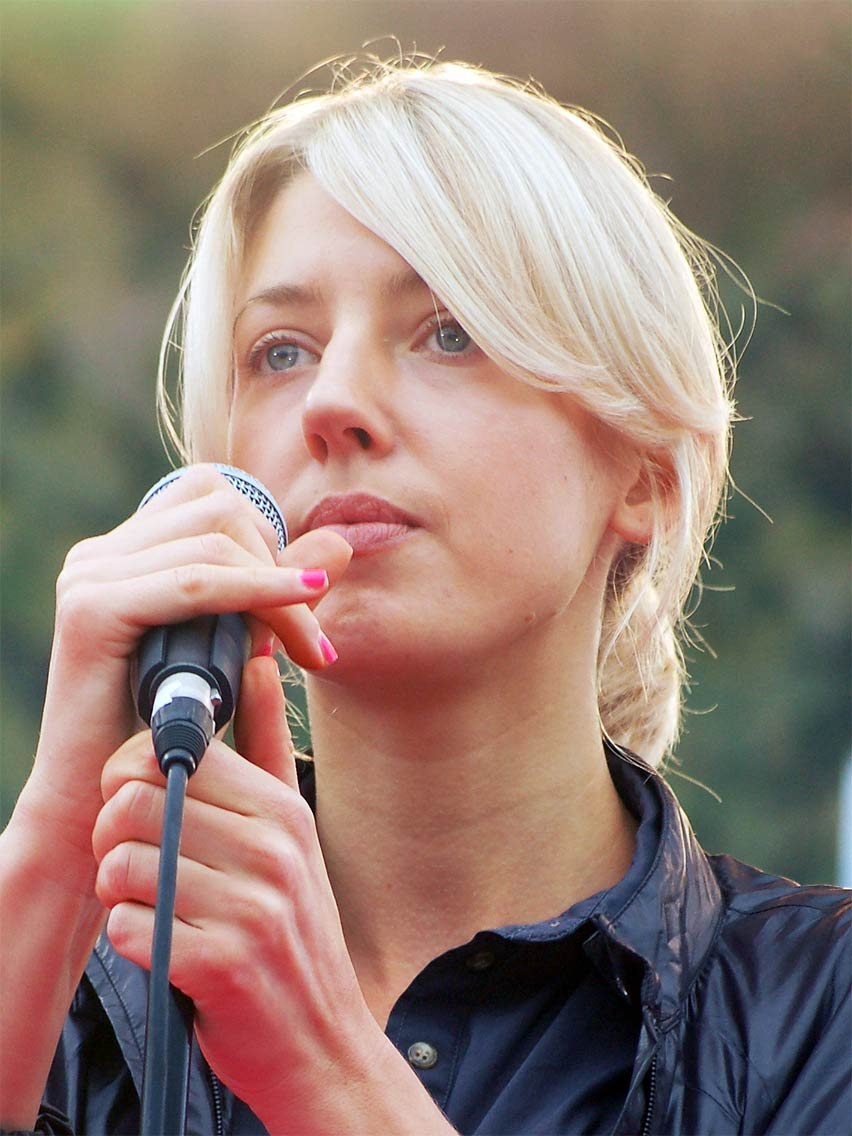
Veronica Maggio

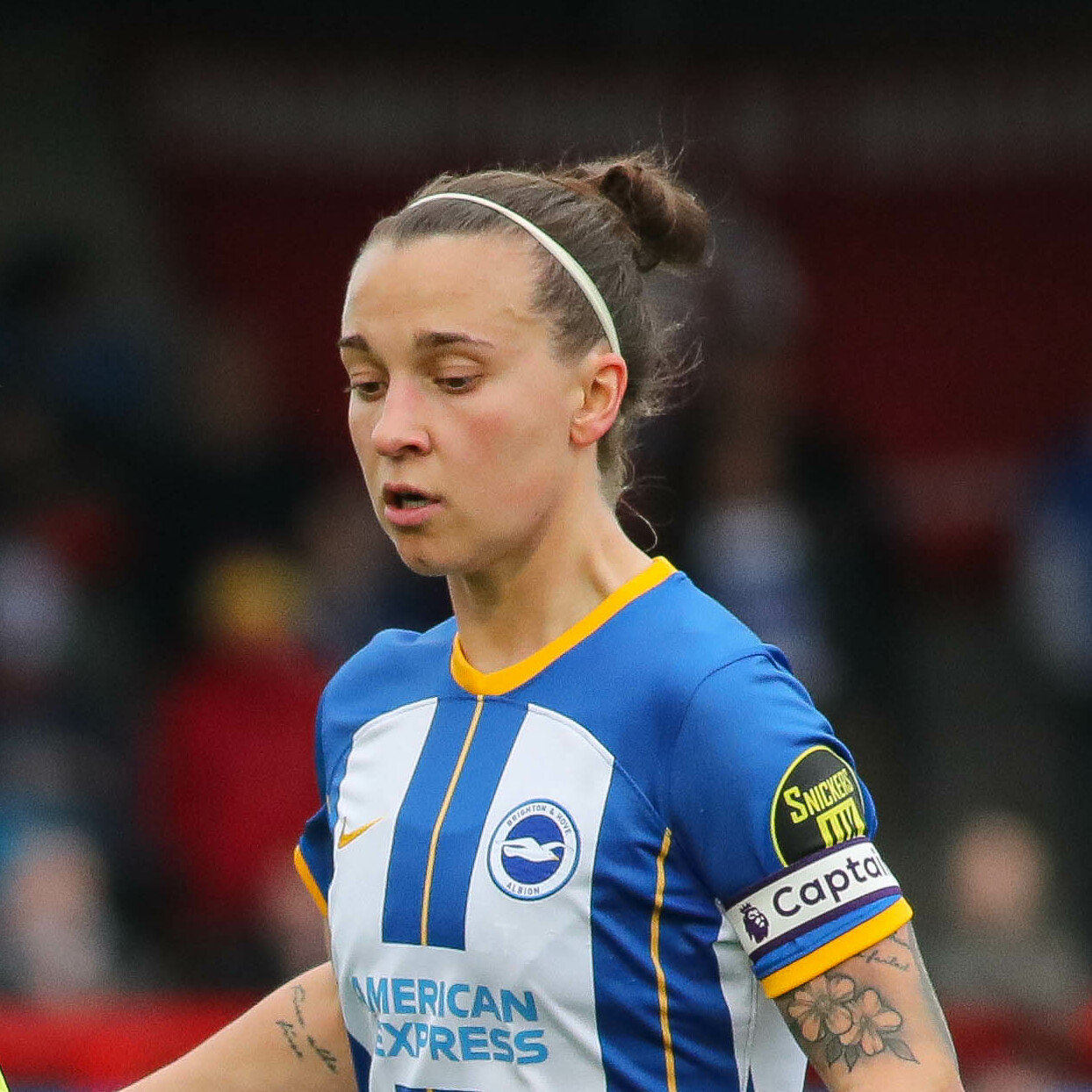
Julia Zigiotti Olme

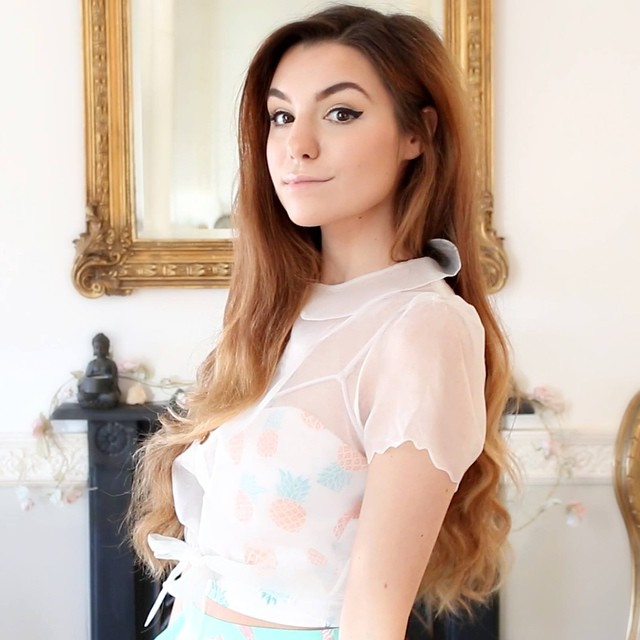
Marzia Kjellberg

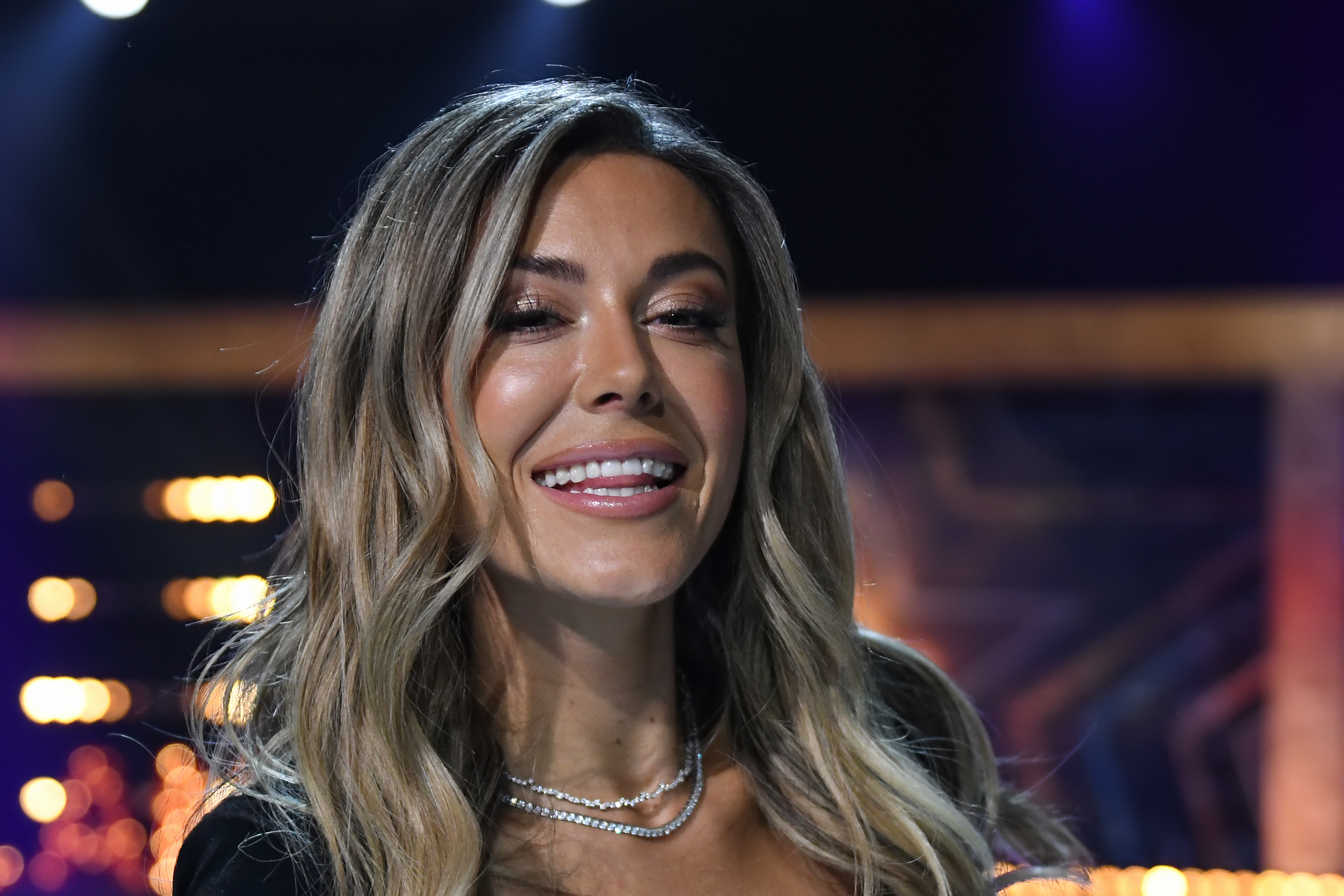
Bianca Ingrosso

== See also ==
- Italy–Sweden relations
- Italian diaspora
- Immigration to Sweden
