= Italian immigration to Belgium =

Belgian citizens of Italian descent

Italian Belgians
Italo-belgi (Italian) Italo-belges (French) Italiaanse Belgen (Dutch)
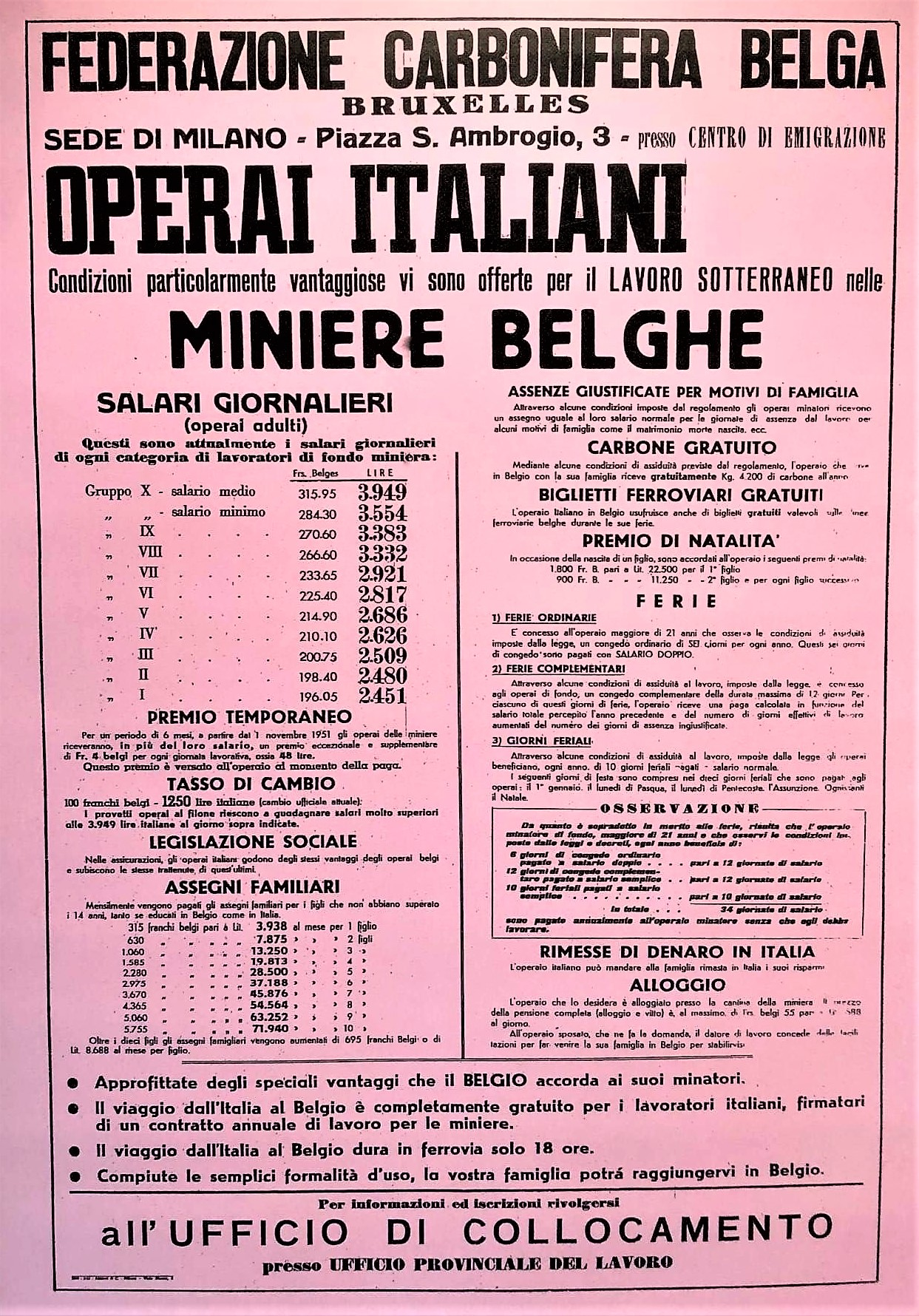
- Belgian poster posted in Italy to encourage Italian immigration to Belgium

Total population
- c. 255,000 (by birth) c. 500,000 (by ancestry)

Regions with significant populations
- Wallonia and Brussels

Languages
- Walloon French · Belgian Dutch · Sicilian • Italian and other languages of Italy

Religion
- Roman Catholic

Related ethnic groups
- Italians, Italian Britons, Italian Finns, Italian French, Italian Germans, Italian Romanians, Italian Spaniards, Italian Swedes, Italian Swiss, Corfiot Italians, Genoese in Gibraltar, Italians of Crimea, Italians of Odesa

Italian Belgians (Italian: italo-belgi; French: italo-belges; Dutch: Italiaanse Belgen) are Belgian citizens of Italian descent. The term may also refer to someone who has immigrated to Belgium from Italy.

== History ==
The first Italians in Belgium were some Tuscan merchants and bankers of the Renaissance, and subsequently a few dozen artisans and exiles until the 18th century.

In the early 19th century, a small community of Italians began to emerge, almost all of them from the north, in the main cities of Wallonia and in Brussels. These Italians, even if a few hundred, made their influence felt in the revolts for the independence of Belgium in 1830.

In 1910, only 4,490 Italians lived in Belgium. They only became a large group starting in the 1920s, when many came to work as laborers in the mining and steel industries of Wallonia. These industries then had a great need for manpower that could not be covered by the internal market. From 1922, the Belgian mines began to recruit workers in Italy; others have come to the country of their own accord. Thus, the Italian community grew to about 30,000 people. However, Italians were not the largest group of guest workers at the time. During the interwar period, the most numerous foreigners were Eastern Europeans. It also faded in the years of fascism until it was made up of a few dozen anti-fascist exiles.

After World War II, Belgium faced a shortage of coal. This deficiency could have had consequences for its reconstruction and for the entire industrial sector. In response to the labor shortage for the coal mines, the Belgian government called on foreign workers. Since the manpower potential of Eastern Europe was no longer available, due to the division of Europe into two blocs (the Eastern Bloc and the Western Bloc), the Italians were called to work in the mines.

On 23 June 1946, a memorandum of understanding was signed between Belgium and Italy, which was in a difficult social situation caused by the defeat in World War II. The agreement provided for the arrival of 50,000 Italians in exchange for the export to Italy of "200 kg of coal per miner per day." However, the need for Italian immigrants increased considerably.

In the years of the conclusion of the various bilateral agreements between Italy and Belgium, such as the protocol of 23 June 1946 and the protocol of 11 December 1957, the Italian immigrants heading to the Belgian coal mines numbered around 24,000 in 1946 and 46,000 in 1948. Apart from a period of decline in the 1950s, in 1961 Italians represented 44.2% of the foreign population in Belgium, reaching 200,000 people.

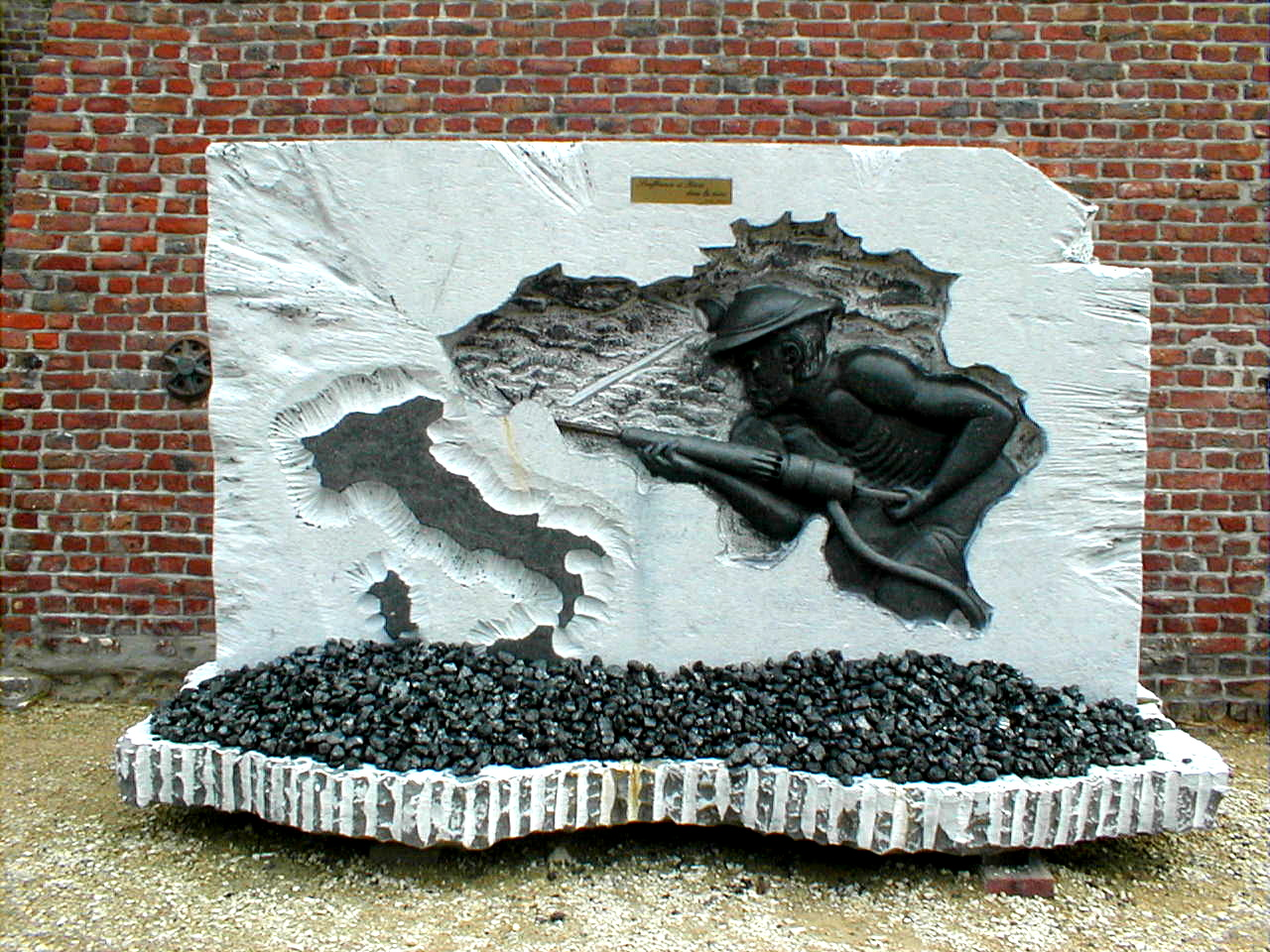
Monument dedicated to the Italians killed during the Marcinelle mining disaster

Between 1946 and 1948, 75,000 Italians arrived in Belgium to work in the Belgian coal mines. This number of Italians on Belgian territory continued to increase, despite the difficult living conditions and mining disasters, such as that of the Marcinelle mining disaster on 8 August 1956, where 262 workers, mostly Italians, died. As a consequence of these events, Italy suspended immigration to Belgium and began immigration by quota. Belgian industry then began hiring workers mainly in Spain, Greece, Morocco and Turkey.

After the 1970s, when almost 300,000 Italians registered in Belgium, emigration decreased and there are currently around 290,000 Italian citizens. It should also be noted that in recent decades, with the creation and development of the European Union and NATO, which have their headquarters in Brussels, many Italian officials and employees, as well as employees of the institutional related industries (freelance professionals, lobbyists, non- government) have moved there to live with their respective families (albeit temporarily). Furthermore, there is a new migratory flow from Italy also in the tertiary sector, especially the advanced one.

== Italian community ==
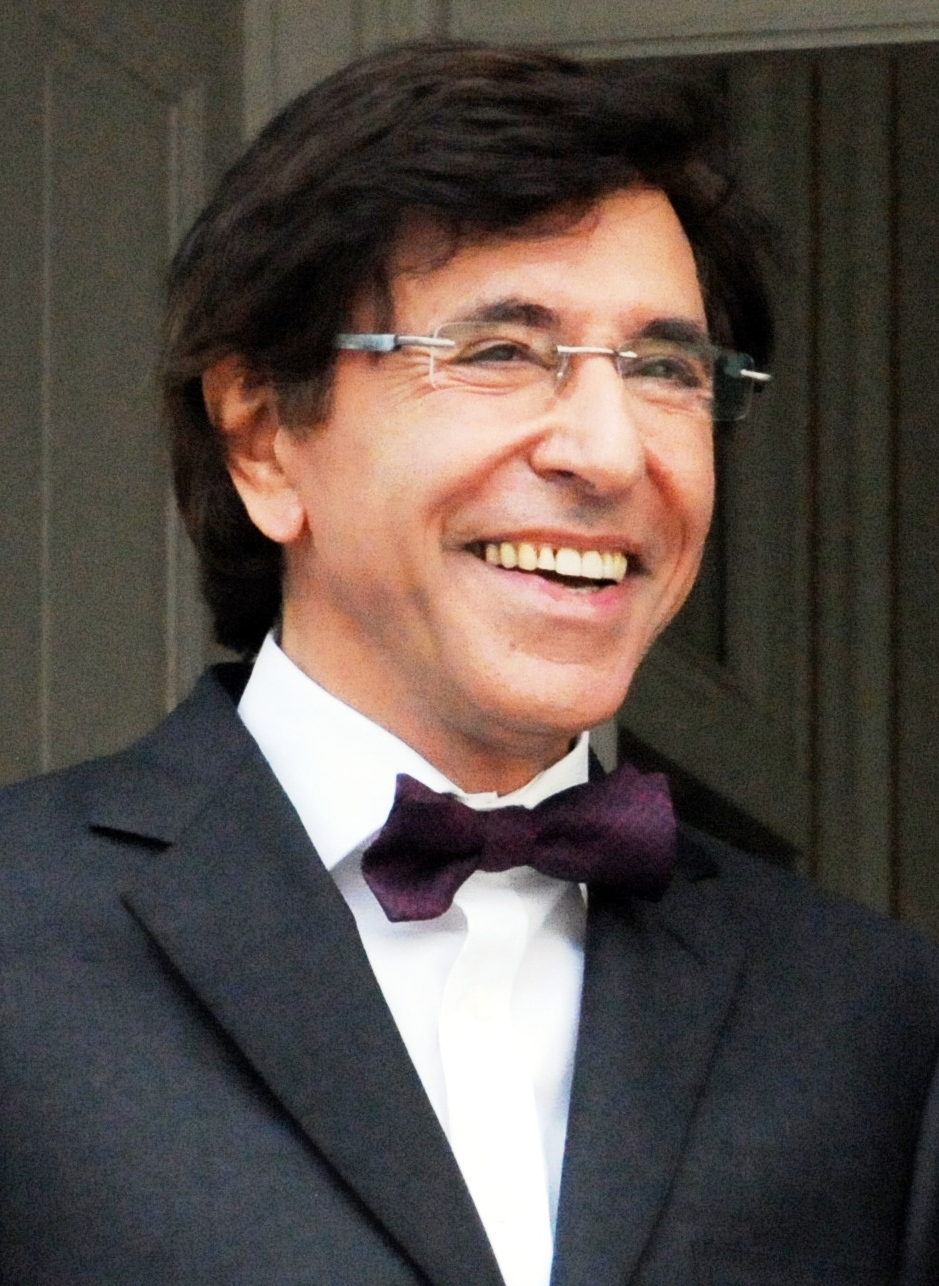
The Italian Belgian Elio Di Rupo, Prime Minister of Belgium from 2011 until 2014

The Italo-Belgians occupy roles of the utmost importance; the Queen of Belgium Paola Ruffo di Calabria or the former Prime Minister Elio Di Rupo are examples.

According to official statistics from AIRE (Register of Italians residing abroad), in 2012 there were approximately 255,000 Italian citizens residing in Belgium (including Belgians with dual citizenship). According to data from the Italian consular registers, it appears that almost 50,000 Italians in Belgium (i.e. more than 25%) come from Sicily, followed by Apulia (9.5%), Abruzzo (7%), Campania (6.5%) and Veneto (6%).

There are about 450,000 (about 4% of the total Belgian population) people of Italian origin in Belgium. The community of Belgians of Italian descent is said to be 85% concentrated in Wallonia and in Brussels. More precisely, 65% of Belgians of Italian descent live in Wallonia, 20% in Brussels and 15% in the Flemish Region.

The Italian community would be the most numerous in Belgium, together with the Moroccan one, and also the oldest. The Italian community in Belgium is integrated into Belgian society. The sectors mainly occupied by Italians residing in Flanders are commerce, transport, accommodation and catering. In Brussels, Italians are more attracted to the administrative, social and health sector, while in Wallonia they turn more to industry and construction.

== Italian press and institutions ==
In Belgium there are numerous institutions to protect Italian-Belgians, both for pensions and for social assistance. Twelve Italian schools, concentrated in Brussels and in Wallonia (such as the consular school office of Charleroi), are dedicated to teaching the Italian language together with institutions such as the Dante Alighieri Society.

The Italian press is very widespread. These are the main publications:

- Azione Sociale, quarterly (Genk, since 1995);
- Il Caffè, quarterly (Ghent, since 2001);
- Communitas, monthly (Brussels, since 1963);
- L'Eco del Belgio, bimonthly (Quaregnon, since 1987);
- Emigrazione Siciliana, bimonthly (Saint-Nicolas);
- L'Isola, bimonthly (Brussels, since 1999);
- Italia News, monthly (Brussels);
- Nuovi Orizzonti Europa - Belgio, bimonthly (Marchienne-au-Pont);
- Oraitalia, monthly (Brussels, since 2006);
- Qui Italia, quarterly (Brussels, since 1994).

== Notable Italian Belgians ==
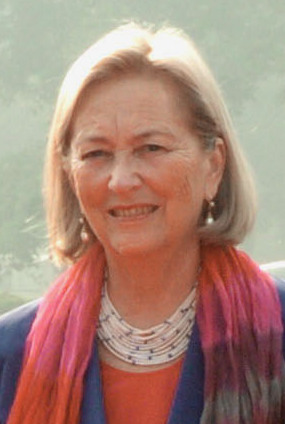
Queen Paola of Belgium

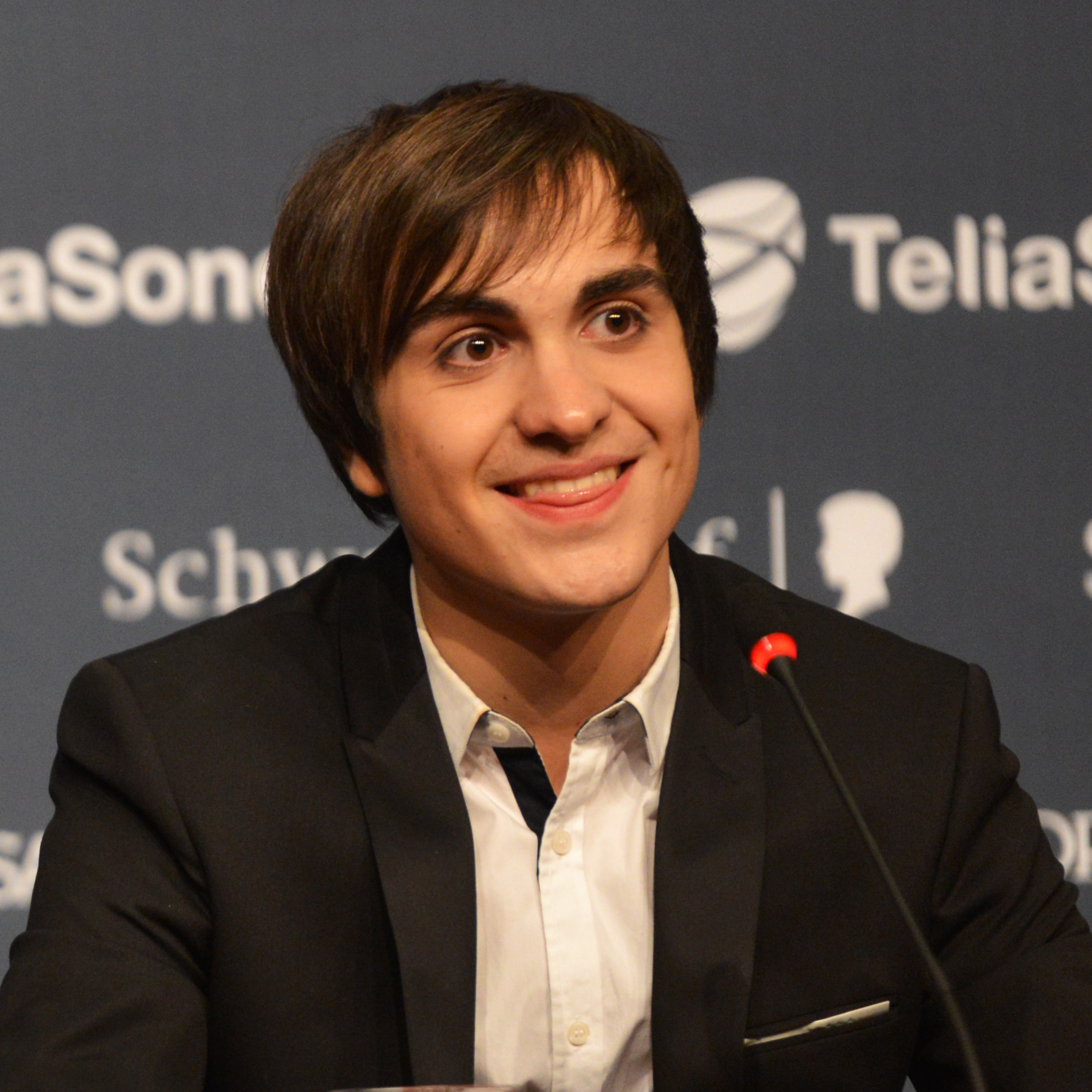
Roberto Bellarosa

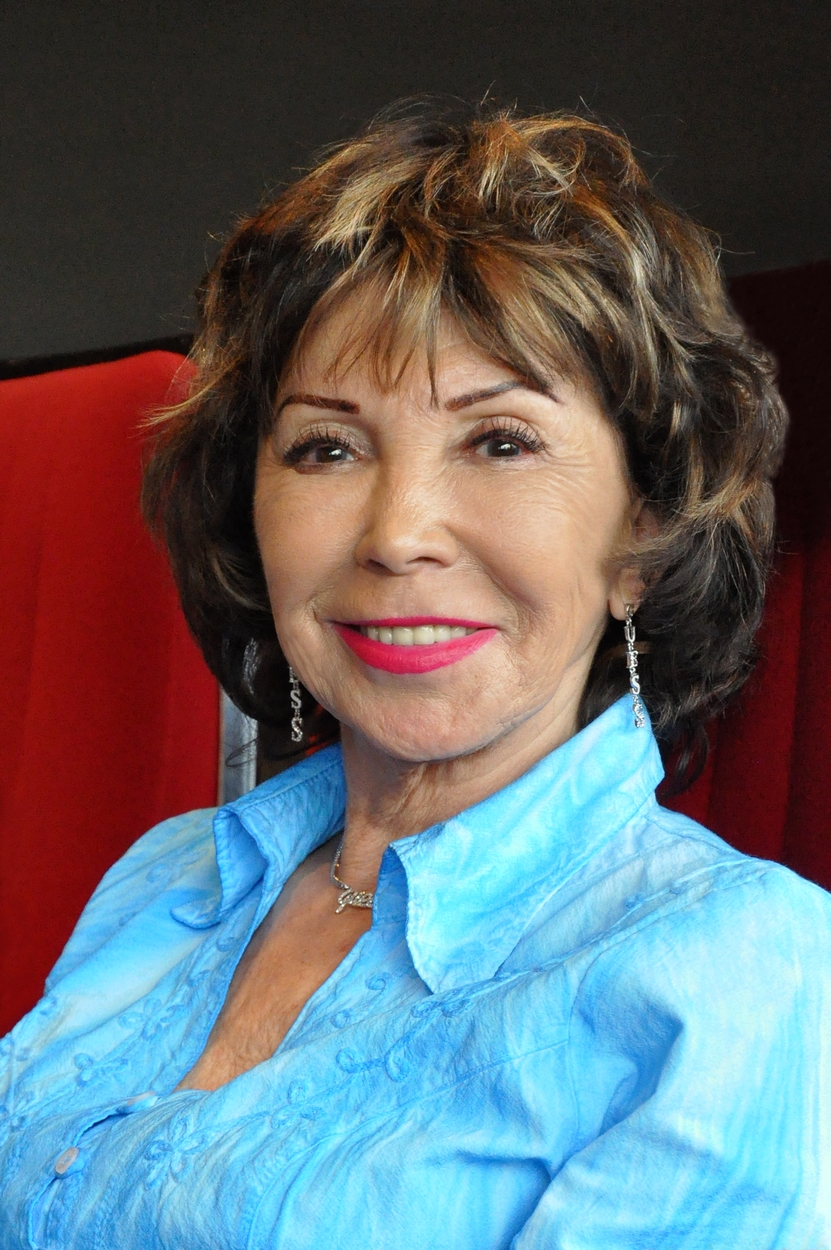
Patricia Carli

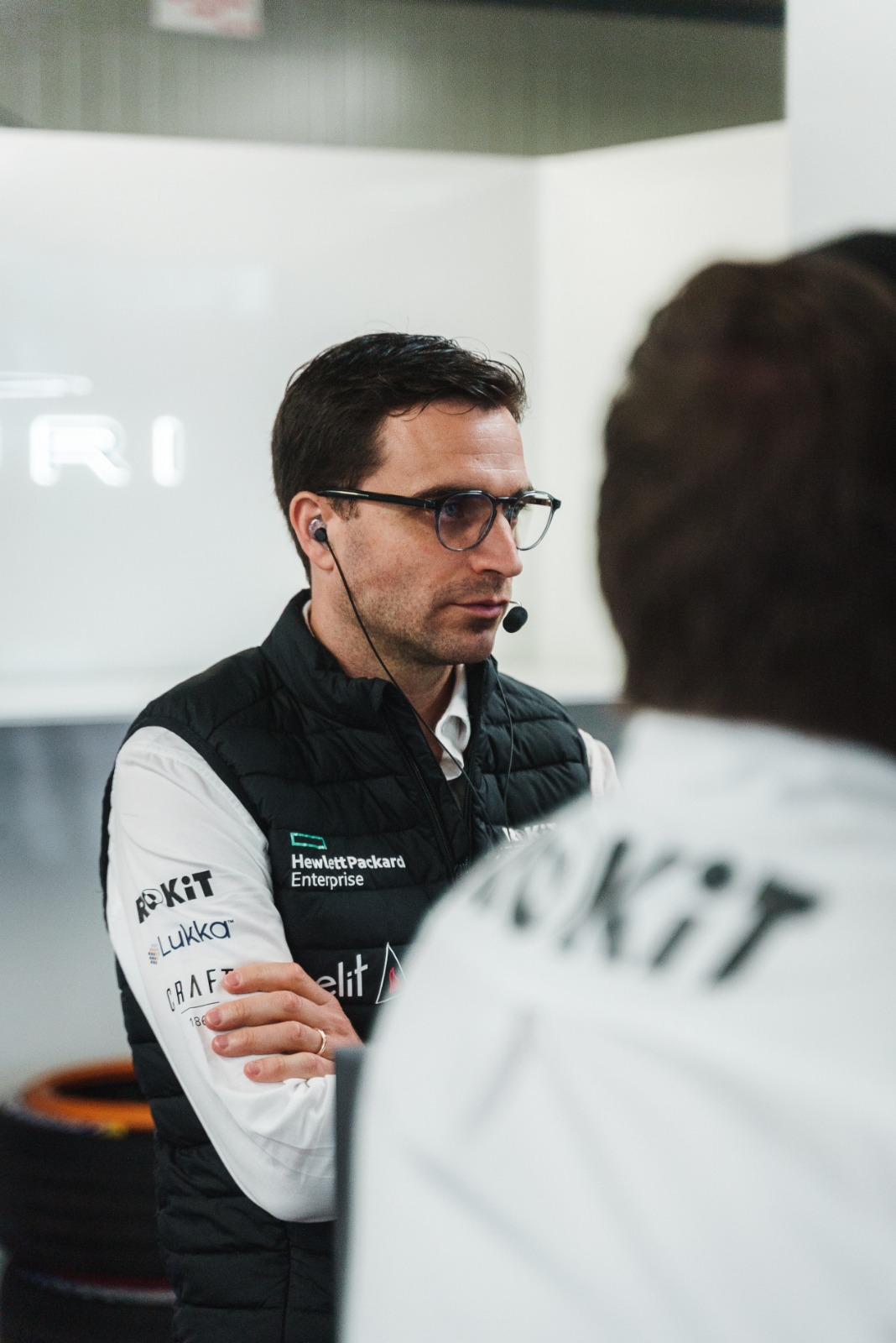
Jérôme d'Ambrosio

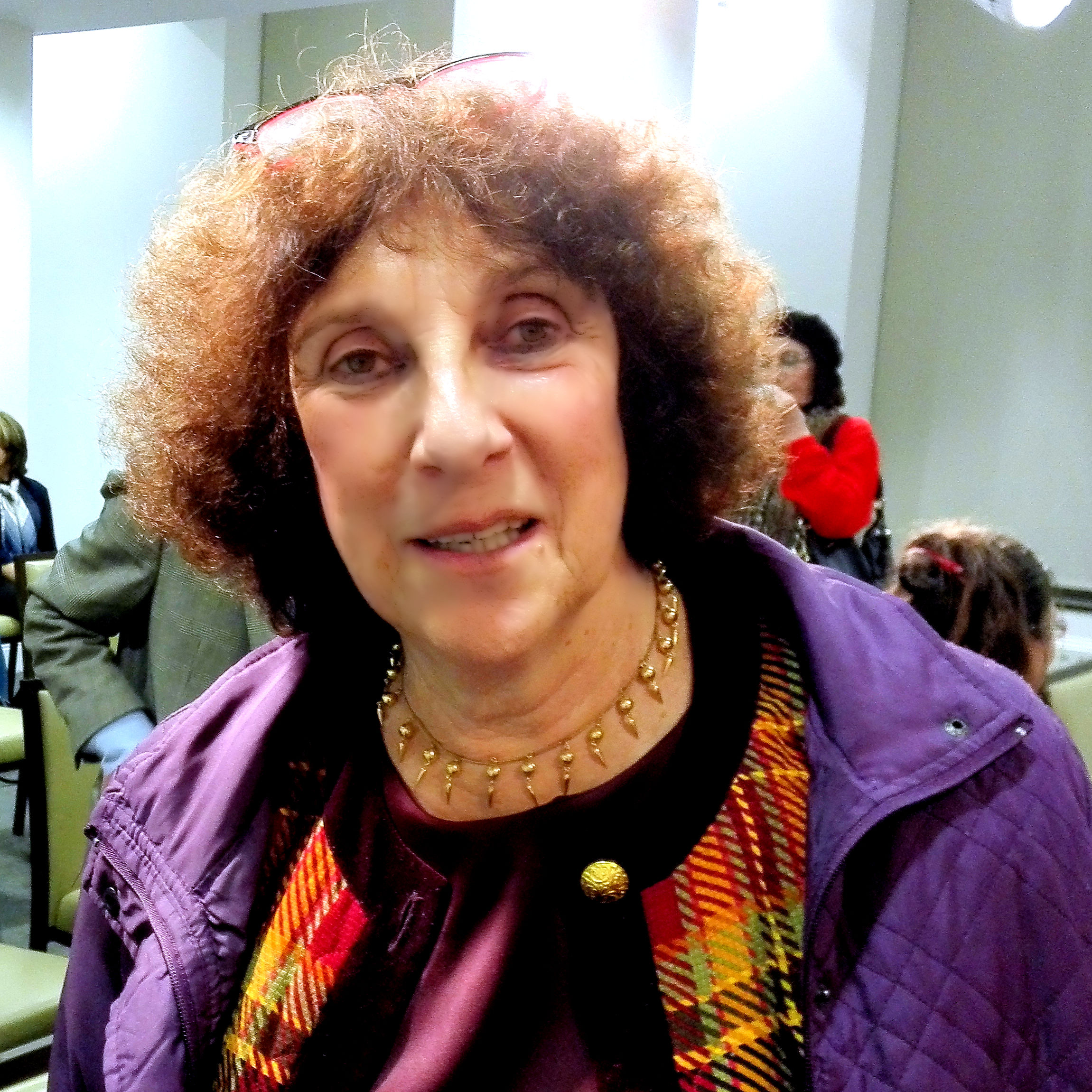
Anne Morelli

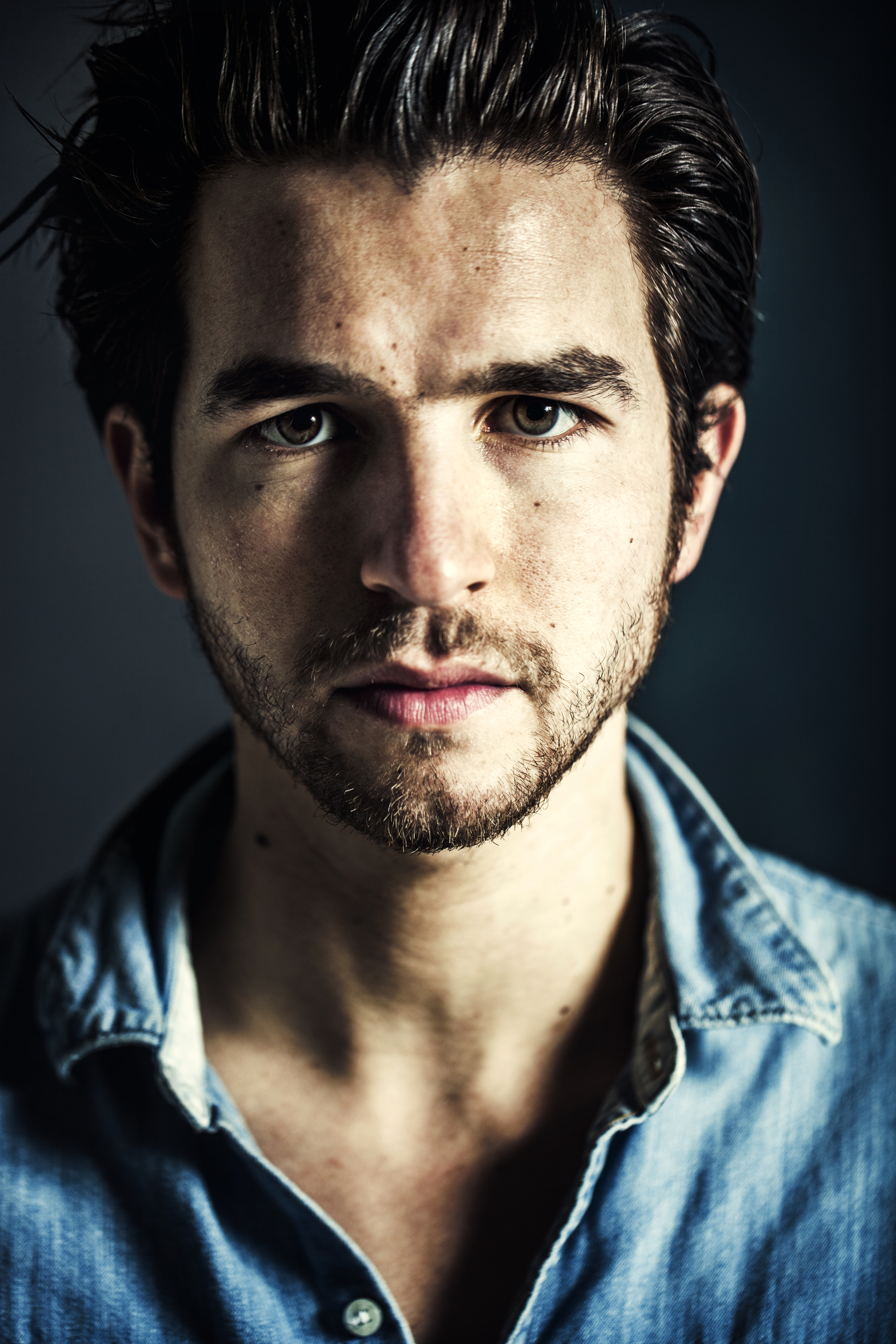
Matteo Simoni

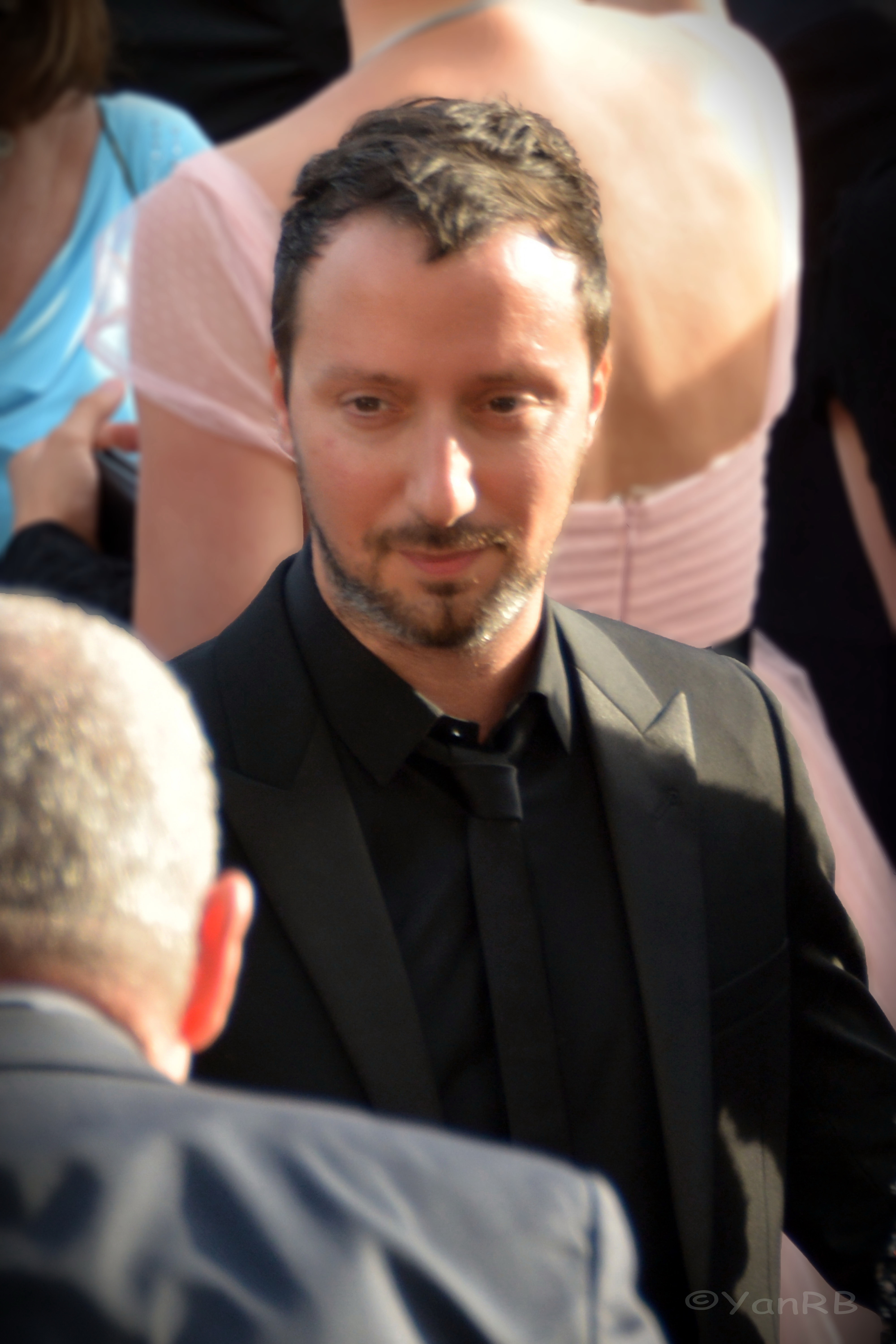
Anthony Vaccarello

- Shawn Adewoye, footballer
- Salvatore Adamo, musician, singer and composer
- Alessandro Albanese, footballer
- Arturo Alfandari, diplomat
- Alessio Allegria, footballer
- Selim Amallah, footballer
- Manuel Angiulli, footballer
- Francesco Antonucci, footballer
- Dino Attanasio, author of comics
- Mario Barravecchia, singer
- Claude Barzotti, singer
- Walter Baseggio, footballer
- Roberto Bellarosa, singer
- Salvatore Bellomo, wrestler
- Lucien Bianchi, racing driver
- Mauro Bianchi, racing driver
- Roberto Bisconti, footballer
- Adrien Bongiovanni, footballer
- Vince Briganti, footballer
- Loris Brogno, footballer
- Toni Brogno, footballer
- Gianni Bruno, footballer
- Massimo Bruno, footballer
- Sébastien Bruzzese, footballer
- Laurent Capelluto, actor
- Fabio Caracciolo, footballer
- Patricia Carli, singer
- Francesco Carratta, footballer
- Alexandro Cavagnera, footballer
- Alessandro Cerigioni, footballer
- Alessandro Ciranni, footballer
- Alessandro Cordaro, footballer
- Jérôme d'Ambrosio, racing driver
- Dominique D'Onofrio, footballer
- François D'Onofrio, footballer
- Délizia, singer
- Eva Dell'Acqua, singer and composer
- Alexandre Di Gregorio, footballer
- Elio Di Rupo, politician
- Franco Dragone, theatre director
- Princess Eléonore of Belgium
- Princess Elisabeth, Duchess of Brabant
- Prince Emmanuel of Belgium
- Isabelle Errera, art historian
- Lara Fabian, singer and songwriter
- Ermano Fegatilli, boxer
- Fabio Ferraro, footballer
- Yannick Ferrera, footballer
- Corentin Fiore, footballer
- Gregory Franchi, racing driver
- Frédéric François, singer and composer
- Paul Furlan, politician
- Prince Gabriel of Belgium
- Maria-Anna Galitzine, activist
- Isabelle Gatti de Gamond, educationalist, feminist, and politician
- Bruno Gazzotti, comic book artist
- Rocco Granata, singer, songwriter, and accordionist
- Jacques Grippa, politician
- Marco Ingrao, footballer
- Alexandre Ippolito, footballer
- Junior Jack, house musician, producer and DJ
- Kid Crème, house musician, producer and DJ
- Sandra Kim, singer
- Sofian Kiyine, footballer
- Lorenzo Lai, footballer
- Prince Laurent of Belgium
- Vittorio Leonardo, comics artist
- Andréa Librici, footballer
- Sébastien Locigno, footballer
- Lufy, blogger
- Nicole Malinconi, writer
- Stefano Marzo, footballer
- Felice Mazzù, footballer
- Frank Michael, singer
- Anne Morelli, historian
- Laura Neri, film director
- Paul Okon-Engstler, footballer
- Domenico Olivieri, footballer
- Marco Ospitalieri, footballer
- Queen Paola of Belgium
- Mauro Pawlowski, singer
- Philippe of Belgium
- Luigi Pieroni, footballer
- Nina Pinzarrone, figure skater
- Sébastien Pocognoli, footballer
- Luca Polizzi, footballer
- Elvis Pompilio, fashion designer
- Silvio Proto, footballer
- Fabrizio Rongione, screenwriter, film producer and actor
- Giuseppe Rossini, footballer
- Georges Ruggiu, radio presenter
- Killian Sardella, footballer
- Andréa Schifano, footballer
- Enzo Scifo, footballer
- Elias Sierra, footballer
- Matteo Simoni, actor
- François Sterchele, footballer
- Olivier Strelli, fashion designer
- Marc Tarabella, politician
- Barbara Tausia, choreographer and dancer
- Laura Tesoro, singer and actress
- Laurence Tieleman, tennis player
- Antef Tsoungui, footballer
- Amber Tysiak, footballer
- Anthony Vaccarello, fashion designer
- Luigi Vaccaro, footballer
- Floriano Vanzo, footballer
- Luigi Verderame, singer
- Franco Zennaro, footballer
- Daniele Zotti, footballer
- Vanessa Van Cartier, drag queen/performer

== See also ==
- Italian diaspora
- Belgium-Italy relations
- Immigration to Belgium

== Bibliography ==
- Favero, Luigi e Tassello, Graziano. Cent'anni di emigrazione italiana (1876-1976). Cser. Roma, 1978 (in Italian).
- Morelli, Anne. Gli italiani del Belgio. Storia e storie di due secoli di migrazioni. Editoriale Umbra. Foligno, 2004 (In Italian).
- Campanella, Carla (2017). "Rocco leert Italiaans: Italiaanse immigranten in Vlaanderen". Brood & Rozen. 22 (2). doi:10.21825/br.v22i2.15857.
- Dumoulin, Michel (1988). "Les mineurs italiens en Belgique (1945-1957): Des relations bilatérales à la dimension européenne". Relations Internationales (54): 205–216. ISSN 0335-2013. JSTOR 45344112.
- Mascitelli, Germano; Morelli, Anne (2023). "L'émigration italienne vers les mines belges (1946-1950) : les motifs politiques et leur héritage". Cahiers d'histoire. Revue d'histoire critique (in French) (156): 93–110. doi:10.4000/chrhc.21219. ISSN 1271-6669.
