= List of French football transfers winter 2010 =

This is a list of French football transfers for the 2010 winter transfer window. The winter transfer window opened on 1 January 2010, although a few transfers took place prior to that date, and closed midnight on 31 January 2010. Only moves involving Ligue 1 and Ligue 2 clubs are listed. Players without a club may join one at any time, either during or in between transfer windows.

== Transfers ==
Date	Name	Moving from	Moving to	Fee
6 September 2009	(South Korea) Lee Yong-Jae	(England) Watford	(France) Nantes	Undisclosed
10 September 2009	(Cameroon) Lucien Owona	(Cameroon) Les Astres	(France) Paris Saint-Germain	Undisclosed
10 September 2009	(Mali) Fousseiny Diawara	(Greece) Panionios	(France) Istres	Free
17 September 2009	(Senegal) Momar Faye	(France) Nancy	(France) Vesoul	Loan
17 September 2009	(France) Chaher Zarour	(France) Cannes	(France) Dijon	Free
6 October 2009	(Republic of the Congo) Matt Moussilou	(France) Nice	(France) Boulogne	Free
7 October 2009	(Cameroon) Jean-Joël Perrier-Doumbé	(Scotland) Celtic	(France) Toulouse	Free
16 October 2009	(Angola) Titi Buengo	(France) Troyes	(France) Châteauroux	Undisclosed
21 October 2009	(Guinea) Bobo Baldé	(Scotland) Celtic	(France) Valenciennes	Free
23 October 2009	(China) Yi Teng	(China) Chengdu Blades	(France) Metz	Undisclosed
27 October 2009	(France) Jonathan Nanizayamo	(France) Rennes	(France) Nantes	Free
27 October 2009	(France) Jean Calvé	(France) Nancy	(France) Grenoble	Loan
9 December 2009	(France) Mathieu Valverde	(France) Boulogne	(France) Toulouse	Free
10 December 2009	(Cameroon) Junior N'Tamé	(Slovenia) Interblock	(France) Brest	Free
13 December 2009	(Ivory Coast) Bakary Soro	(France) Lorient	(France) Arles-Avignon	Free
15 December 2009	(Algeria) Nasser Ouadah	(France) Montpellier	(France) Châteauroux	Free
18 December 2009	(Senegal) Pape Diakhaté	(Ukraine) Dynamo Kyiv	(France) Saint-Étienne	Loan
25 December 2009	(Ivory Coast) Yannick Boli	(France) Paris Saint-Germain	(France) Nîmes	Loan
27 December 2009	(Senegal) Papy Mison Djilobodji	(France) Sénart-Moissy	(France) Nantes	Undisclosed
2 January 2010	(France) Laurent Macquet	(France) Grenoble	(France) Vannes	Free
3 January 2010	(France) David Gigliotti	(France) Saint-Étienne	(France) Le Havre	Free
3 January 2010	(France) Alexandre Garcia	(France) Consolat Marseille	(France) Bastia	Free
4 January 2010	(Switzerland) Almen Abdi	(Switzerland) Zürich	(France) Le Mans	Free
4 January 2010	(Morocco) Saïd Aït-Bahi	(France) Gueugnon	(France) Nîmes	Free
5 January 2010	(France) Brice Jovial	(France) Beauvais	(France) Le Havre	Undisclosed
5 January 2010	(France) Kevin Lejeune	(France) Auxerre	(France) Nantes	Loan
6 January 2010	(Cameroon) Dieudonné Bikoyoï	(France) Évian	(France) Istres	Undisclosed
6 January 2010	(Algeria) Sofiane Taïbi	(France) Pau	(France) Istres	Undisclosed
7 January 2010	(France) Kévin Bru	(France) Rennes	(France) Dijon	Free
7 January 2010	(Mali) Alphousseyni Keita	(France) Le Mans	(France) Nîmes	Loan
7 January 2010	(Cameroon) Henri Bedimo	(France) Châteauroux	(France) Lens	Undisclosed
7 January 2010	(France) Didier Digard	(England) Middlesbrough	(France) Nice	Loan
7 January 2010	(Algeria) Idir Ouali	(Belgium) Mouscron	(France) Le Mans	Free
8 January 2010	(Chile) Juan Gonzalo Lorca	(Chile) Colo-Colo	(France) Boulogne	€0.4M
8 January 2010	(France) Paul Lasne	(France) Bordeaux	(France) Châteauroux	Loan
8 January 2010	(France) Fabien Laurenti	(France) Lens	(France) Brest	Loan
8 January 2010	(France) Olivier Kapo	(England) Wigan	(France) Boulogne	Loan
8 January 2010	(Norway) Rune Ertsås	(Norway) Molde	(France) Tours	€0.15M
8 January 2010	(France) Grégory Lorenzi	(France) Brest	(France) Bastia	Loan
8 January 2010	(Mauritius) Jacques-Désiré Périatambée	(France) Dijon	(France) Bastia	Free
9 January 2010	(Argentina) Renato Civelli	(Argentina) San Lorenzo	(France) Nice	Loan
11 January 2010	(France) [[Steeven Joseph-Monrose {{{last}}}]]	(France) Lens	(France) Châteauroux	Loan
11 January 2010	(France) Jonathan Martins Pereira	(France) Ajaccio	(France) Nantes	Undisclosed
11 January 2010	(Niger) Ouwo Moussa Maazou	(Russia) CSKA	(France) AS Monaco	Loan
12 January 2010	(France) Walid Mesloub	(France) Istres	(France) Le Havre	Undisclosed
12 January 2010	(France) Romain Brégerie	(France) Metz	(France) Châteauroux	Loan
13 January 2010	(Croatia) Dejan Lovren	(Croatia) Dinamo Zagreb	(France) Lyon	€10M
13 January 2010	(France) Geoffrey Doumeng	(France) Lens	(France) Tours	Loan
15 January 2010	(Morocco) Issam El Adoua	(France) Lens	(France) Nantes	Loan
16 January 2010	(France) Habib Bellaïd	(Germany) Eintracht Frankfurt	(France) Boulogne	Loan
18 January 2010	(Croatia) Igor Prahić	(Croatia) Varteks	(France) Sedan	Undisclosed
18 January 2010	(France) Mathieu Robail	(France) Dijon	(France) Bastia	Free
19 January 2010	(France) Loris Arnaud	(France) Paris Saint-Germain	(France) Clermont	Loan
20 January 2010	(Nigeria) Ideye Aide Brown	(Switzerland) Neuchâtel Xamax	(France) Sochaux	€4M
20 January 2010	(Turkey) Kâzım Kâzım	(Turkey) Fenerbahçe	(France) Toulouse	Loan
20 January 2010	(Belgium) Andréa Schifano	(Belgium) Mouscron	(France) Arles-Avignon	Free
21 January 2010	(Mali) Mustapha Yatabaré	(France) Clermont	(France) Boulogne	Undisclosed
22 January 2010	(Brazil) Abuda	(Brazil) Avaí	(France) Tours	Free
26 January 2010	(Cameroon) Albert Baning	(France) Paris Saint-Germain	(France) Strasbourg	Loan
26 January 2010	(Mali) Mody Traoré	(France) Valenciennes	(France) Ajaccio	Loan
26 January 2010	(France) Olivier Giroud	(France) Tours	(France) Montpellier	Undisclosed
26 January 2010	(France) Olivier Giroud	(France) Montpellier	(France) Tours	Loan
26 January 2010	(Togo) Serge Gakpé	(France) AS Monaco	(France) Tours	Loan
27 January 2010	(Morocco) Youssef Mokhtari	(Germany) Greuther Fürth	(France) Metz	Free
27 January 2010	(Ghana) Moussa Narry	(France) Auxerre	(France) Le Mans	Loan
28 January 2010	(France) Garry Bocaly	(France) Marseille	(France) Montpellier	Loan
28 January 2010	(Mali) Adama Tamboura	(Sweden) Helsingborg	(France) Metz	Undisclosed
29 January 2010	(Portugal) Ricardo Costa	(Germany) VfL Wolfsburg	(France) Lille	Free
29 January 2010	(Ivory Coast) Angoua Benjamin	(Hungary) Budapest Honvéd	(France) Valenciennes	Undisclosed
30 January 2010	(France) Sylvain Wiltord	Unattached	(France) Metz	Free
30 January 2010	(France) Loris Arnaud	(France) Paris Saint-Germain	(France) Clermont	Loan
30 January 2010	(Cameroon) Albert Baning	(France) Paris Saint-Germain	(France) Strasbourg	Loan
2 February 2010	(France) Grégory Bourillon	(France) Paris Saint-Germain	(France) Lorient	€1.7M

- ^1 Player who signed with club before 1 January officially joined his new club on 1 January 2010, while player who joined after 1 January joined his new club following his signature of the contract.
