= Vaccher =

Vaccher is a surname. Notable people with the surname include:

- Andrea Vaccher (born 1988), Italian cyclist
- Ron Vaccher (1928–2001), Canadian football player

== See also ==
- Vacchi
