= Italians in Finland =

Finnish citizens of Italian descent

Italian Finns
Italo-finlandesi (Italian) Suomenitalialaiset (Finnish)
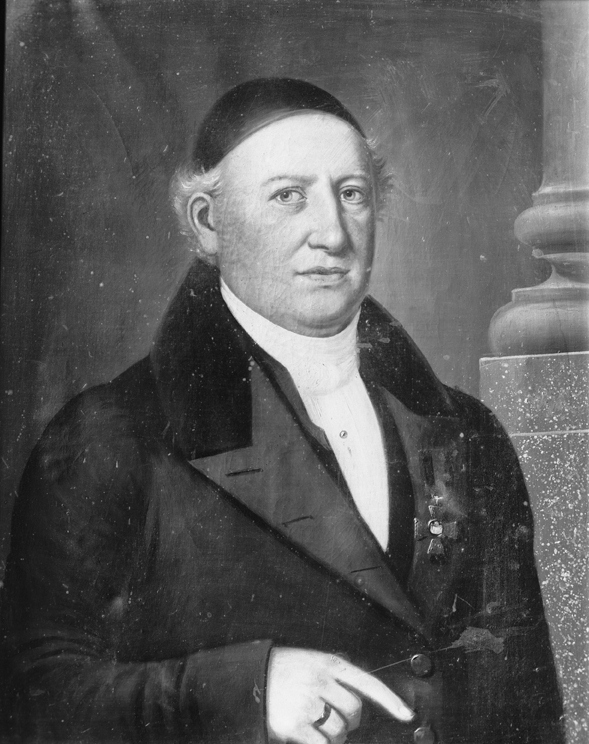
- Charles Bassi

Total population
- 3,510

Regions with significant populations
- Helsinki, Espoo, Vantaa, Turku, Tampere

Languages
- Finnish · Italian and Italian dialects

Religion
- Catholicism

Related ethnic groups
- Italians, Italian Belgians, Italian Britons, Italian French, Italian Germans, Italian Romanians, Italian Spaniards, Italian Swedes, Italian Swiss, Corfiot Italians, Genoese in Gibraltar, Italians of Crimea, Italians of Odesa

Italian Finns (Italian: italo-finlandesi; Finnish: Suomenitalialaiset) are Finnish-born citizens who are fully or partially of Italian descent, whose ancestors emigrated Italy to Finland during the Italian diaspora, or Italian-born people living in Finland.

== Characteristics ==
The number of Italians can only be measured in the number of Italian speakers, people born in Italy and their children, since Finland does not collect statistics on ethnicity.

The "Associazione degli Italiani" in Finland, founded in 1990, operates in Finland as an aggregation society for Italian-Finnish people. Furthermore, the Finland-Italy cultural society operates in Finland, founded in 1963, to increase cultural exchanges between the two cultures.

== Demographics ==
67% of Italian Finns are male and 33% are female. 51.3% of Italian Finns are employed, 9.5% are unemployed and 39.2% are outside the labour force. There are over 200 Italian students in Finland, and over 160 Italian entrepreneurs. 761 Italian men are in a registered relationship with a Finnish woman.

In 2018:

- 1,133 Finns had a dual Italian citizenship
- 2,441 Finns had an Italian background
- 2,709 Finns had an Italian citizenship
- 2,857 Finns spoke Italian as their native language
- 2,956 Finns were born in Italy

Historical population
Year	Pop.	±%
1980	275	—
1990	475	+72.7%
2000	958	+101.7%
2010	1,790	+86.8%
2018	2,956	+65.1%
2021	3,395	+14.9%
Source: Statistics Finland

Italians by Municipality in 2018
No.	Municipality	Italians	%
1.	Helsinki	1,078	0.17
2.	Espoo	336	0.12
3.	Vantaa	226	0.10
4.	Turku	186	0.10
5.	Tampere	163	0.07

== Notable people ==
- Marco Matrone, footballer
- Matias Maccelli, ice hockey player
- Charles Bassi, architect
- Lauri Dalla Valle, former footballer
- Marco Parnela, former footballer
- Antonio Inutile, footballer
- Anna Falchi, model and actress
- Marco Casagrande, architect
- Manuela Bosco, actress
- Clara Petrozzi, violist
- Monica Sileoni, retired artistic gymnast
- Janna Hurmerinta, singer
- Maarit Hurmerinta, singer and musician
- Andreas Bernard, ice hockey goaltender
- Eugenio Giraldoni, operatic baritone
- Sara Negri, mathematical logician
- Egle Oddo, visual artist

== See also ==
- Finland–Italy relations
- Italian diaspora
- Immigration to Finland
