= Schifano =

Schifano is an Italian surname. Notable people with the surname include:

- Andréa Schifano (born 1991), Belgian footballer
- Helen Schifano (1922–2007), American gymnast
- Mario Schifano (1934–1998), Italian painter and collagist
