= Verderame =

Verderame is a surname. Notable people with the surname include:

- Lori Verderame (born 1965), American television personality and art appraiser
- Luigi Verderame (born 1950), Belgian singer

== See also ==
- Verdirame
