= Italians in Spain =

Italian citizens in Spain

Total population
- c. 260,000 (by citizenship) c. 143,000 (by birth)

Regions with significant populations
- Catalonia, the Community of Madrid, the Valencian Community, the Balearic Islands, the Canary Islands

Languages
- Spanish · Italian and Italian dialects

Religion
- Roman Catholicism

Related ethnic groups
- Italians, Italian Belgians, Italian Britons, Italian Finns, Italian French, Italian Germans, Italian Romanians, Italian Swedes, Italian Swiss, Corfiot Italians, Genoese in Gibraltar, Italians of Crimea, Italians of Odesa

Italians in Spain are one the largest communities of immigrant groups in Spain, with 260,000 Italian citizens in the country, of which 143,000 were born in Italy.

== History ==
From the 18th century, many Italians settled in Spain and in the Spanish Empire to work in the administration of the Bourbon dynasty. The Italian Giulio Alberoni was appointed as minister of foreign affairs in 1715.

In the 19th century, after the departure of Queen Isabella II, the parliament chose the Italian prince Amedeo of Savoy to reign in Spain and did so (as Amedeo I) between 1871 and 1873.

Nowadays Italians in Spain are one of the largest communities of immigrant groups in Spain, with 257,256 Italian citizens in the country; conversely, 142,401 residents in Spain were born in Italy. Part of the Italian citizens living in Spain are not native from Italy but emigrated from countries like Argentina or Uruguay.

The immigration rate of Italian nationals increased in the second part of the 2010s, and, in 2018, Italians trumped Chinese nationals as the third biggest foreign nationality in the Spanish workforce. Most of the Italians citizens dwell in Catalonia, the Community of Madrid, the Valencian Community, the Balearic Islands and the Canary Islands.

== Foreign population of Italian citizenship in Spain ==
Vertical bar chart of foreign population of Italian nationality in Spain between 2003 and 2022
Population (2003-2022) Foreign population in Spain of Italian nationality according to the Instituto Nacional de Estadística.

== See also ==
- Italy–Spain relations
