= Verdirame =

Verdirame is a surname. Notable people with the surname include:

- Guglielmo Verdirame, Baron Verdirame (born 1971), British and Italian lawyer and activist
- Sergio Verdirame (born 1970), Argentine footballer

== See also ==
- Verderame
