= Vacchi =

Vacchi is a surname. Notable people with the surname include:

- Fabio Vacchi (born 1949), Italian composer
- Roberto Vacchi (born 1965), Italian-Swedish sports commentator
- Sergio Vacchi (1925–2016), Italian painter

== See also ==
- 7600 Vacchi, main-belt asteroid discovered in 1994
- Vacchi Piedmont Glacier, on the Scott Coast, in Victoria Land
