= Ron Vaccher =

Canadian football player

Profile
- Position: End

Personal information
- Born: June 22, 1928; Winnipeg, Manitoba
- Died: December 15, 2001 (aged 73); Calgary, Alberta
- Listed height: 6 ft 2 in (1.88 m)
- Listed weight: 195 lb (88 kg)

Career history
- 1947–1954: Winnipeg Blue Bombers

Ronald M. Vaccher (June 22, 1928 – December 15, 2001) was a Canadian professional football player who played for the Winnipeg Blue Bombers. He played football at St. Paul's College and the Winnipeg Rods (junior), then in 1947 began his career as an end and linebacker with the Winnipeg Blue Bombers, retiring from the game in 1954.

Vaccher joined the Winnipeg branch of the Canada Life Assurance Company in 1954. His success in personal production led to his appointment as Supervisor in 1959, and to Assistant to the Manager in 1960. Later that year he moved to home office in Toronto where his executive abilities saw him promoted through the positions of Agency Assistant, Agency Supervisor, Assistant Supervisor of Agencies and in 1966, Superintendent of Agencies. Vaccher became an officer of the company in 1963. In 1968 he returned to Winnipeg as manager of the Winnipeg branch. He served on the Canadian Advisory Council and in 1980 was appointed manager of the Winnipeg Brokerage Services, retiring in June 1988.
