= Saïd Aït-Bahi =

Moroccan footballer

Personal information
- Full name: Saïd Aït-Bahi
- Date of birth: 8 May 1984 (age 42)
- Place of birth: Rabat, Morocco
- Height: 1.92 m (6 ft 3 1/2 in)
- Position: Centre back

Team information
- Current team: Saint-Pol-sur-Mer

Youth career
- 2003–2006: FUS Rabat

Senior career*
Years	Team	Apps	(Gls)
2006–2008	FUS Rabat		
2008–2009	Ittihad Khemisset	27	(8)
2009–2010	Gueugnon	0	(0)
2010	Nîmes	15	(1)
2010–2012	Créteil	22	(0)
2012–2017	Dunkerque	137	(5)
2017–	Saint-Omer	?	(?)
- * Club domestic league appearances and goals as of 1 February 2018

Saïd Aït-Bahi (سعيد آيت باهي) (born 1984 in Rabat) is a Moroccan football player who currently blazes for French semi-professional club US Saint-Omer. Before moving to France, Aït-Bahi played for Moroccan clubs FUS Rabat and Ittihad Khemisset. In 2009, he joined FC Gueugnon and later had a spell with Nîmes Olympique. In June 2010, Aït-Bahi signed for Championnat National side US Créteil-Lusitanos. On 11 January 2012, it was announced that he had terminated his contract with Créteil to move elsewhere.
