= Egle Oddo =

Italian visual artist

Egle Oddo (Palermo, 1975) is an Italian visual artist residing in Helsinki, Finland.

== Biography ==
She is a graduate of Palermo's Academy of Fine Arts, and has worked in Cuba, England, France, Finland, Germany, Italy, Nicaragua, Spain, Sweden, and Russia. She has won several prizes, including the Premio Felice Casorati, In 2012, she was chosen to participate in the Venice Biennale, Italian Pavilion in the World. Her work focuses on narrative as an art form, combining different media, performative elements and the investigation of social interaction.

In the years 2003-2009, she was part of La Sala Naranja, an art collective that was founded by the art critic Toni Calderòn with the purpose of discovering and promoting artists. In 2006, she founded the Namastic art collective together with Toni Ledentsa and Virva Sointu, its function is to promote exchanges between Finnish artists and other art organizations. In the same year, she, along with Anu Miettinen and Anastasia Eliseeva, founded LARU Environmental Art, a non-profit organization that presents yearly art exhibitions, performances and workshops in Helsinki.

She has exhibited in Luova.fi Gallery, Baltic Biennale, LARU art, and an extract of her book Le Superfici Piane was chosen by the writer Giorgio Vasta for the literary web-blog Nazione Indiana.
