= Marcus Birro =

Swedish writer

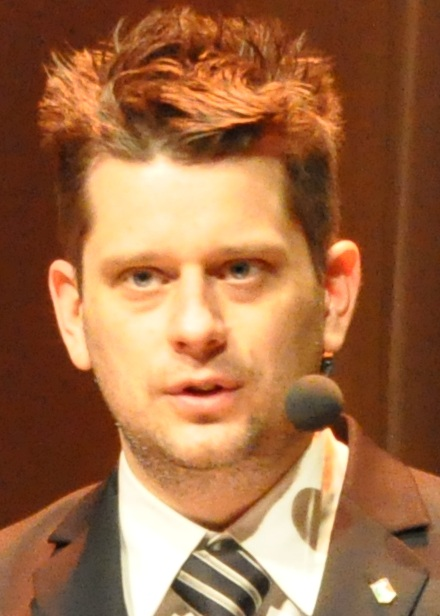
- Birro in 2010
- Born: June 15, 1972 (age 54); Gothenburg, Sweden
- Occupation: Author
- Relatives: Peter Birro (brother)
- Writing career
- Language: Swedish
- Website: marcusbirro.se

Marcus Adriano Birro (born 15 June 1972 in Gothenburg, Sweden) is a Swedish-Italian (Italian citizen) poet, author and columnist and former frontman of cult punk band The Christer Petterssons. Birro blogged at Expressen and was a presenter on at Sveriges Radio Östergötland, where he was the host of Karlavagnen on Sveriges Radio P4. He is the brother of author Peter Birro. Marcus Birro lives in Södermalm, is divorced from his wife of 4 years, they have two children together. In 2015, Birro told the press about his ongoing relationship with a married woman, Micaela Kinnunen, wife of politician Martin Kinnunen, and later Kinnunen confirmed the relationship and her divorce via her Facebook page.

== Bibliography ==
- Lämna mig aldrig: en roman om kärlek - 2017
- Mitt hjärta står öppet - 2014
- Evangelium enligt Marcus - 2014
- Calcio amore : drömmen - 2013
- Att leva och dö som Joe Strummer - 2010
- 43 dikter - 2006
- Flyktsoda - 2005
- Krig hela tiden - 2005
- Du är Christer Pettersson du också - texts from SR, SVT and newspapers - 2005
- Diktskola - Författarens guide till galaxen - 2003
- Landet utanför - 2003
- Kalashnikov - 2001
- Alla djävulska främlingar - 1999
- Skjut dom som älskar - 1997
- Det oerhörda och I den andra världen - 1992
