= Sofiane Taïbi =

Algerian footballer (born 1987)

Personal information
- Date of birth: 5 August 1987 (age 39)
- Height: 1.70 m (5 ft 7 in)
- Position: Midfielder

Youth career
- FC Lorient

Senior career*
Years	Team	Apps	(Gls)
2006–2007	AS Cherbourg	10	(0)
2008–2009	Pau FC	19	(7)
2010–2011	FC Istres	4	(0)
2010–2011	→ UJA Alfortville (loan)	15	(1)
2011–2012	Pau	24	(6)
2012–2013	Toulouse Rodéo		
2013	US Albi	17	(6)
2013–2014	Pau	22	(1)
2014–2015	Saint-Alban Aucamville FC		
2015–2016	UA Fenouillet		
2016	Blagnac	1	(0)
2016–2017	Toulouse Rodéo	5	(1)
2017	Lavaur FC		
2017	US Albi		
2017–2018	AS Muret	17	(9)
2019	Blagnac FC	4	(0)
2020	Toulouse Pradettes		
2021	Eaunes Labarthe		

International career
2004	Algeria U20	2	(0)
- * Club domestic league appearances and goals as of 14:26, 13 November 2019 (UTC)

Sofiane Taïbi (Arabic: سفيان طيبي; also spelled Sofian, born 5 August 1987) is an Algerian football player.

== Club career ==
A product of the FC Lorient junior ranks, Taïbi joined Championnat National-side Cherbourg in 2006 before moving to Pau FC in 2008. On 30 June 2009, he went on trial with Ligue 1 side Valenciennes FC but was not offered a deal.

On 5 January 2010, Taïbi signed with Ligue 2 side FC Istres. He made his debut for the club on 19 February 2010 in a 2–1 league loss to Le Havre AC.

In January 2019, he returned to Blagnac FC.

== International career ==
In 2004, Taïbi was called up to the Algerian Under-20 National Team to take part in the Tournoi de Mulhouse. Despite the team losing in the semi-finals, Taïbi was chosen as the Player of the Tournament.
