= Peter Birro =

Swedish script writer, poet and musician

- Occupation: Screenwriter
- Relatives: Marcus Birro
- Awards: Ingmar Bergman Award (Agneta Fagerström-Olsson, 1997)

Peter Birro (born 19 July 1966 in Gothenburg) is a Swedish script writer, poet and musician.

In the 1980s and early 1990s, Birro was an obscure poet who performed with the almost equally obscure Swedish band The Christer Petterssons (named after the suspected assassin of Swedish Prime minister Olof Palme, Christer Pettersson). Birro's breakthrough as a writer was his script for the TV-series Hammarkullen (1997) directed by Agneta Fagerström-Olsson, which follows some people living in a low-income suburb of Gothenburg. It was widely praised for its humor and realism, although some of the real inhabitants of Hammarkullen were not amused.

Birro's first film script, Knockout (2000), also directed by Fagerström-Olsson and telling the story of a washed up Swedish boxer lost in the Russian city of Murmansk, was a critical and box-office failure. His next film script, Bäst i Sverige! (English title: We can be heroes!, 2002), directed by Ulf Malmros and telling the story of a young football player, was more favorably received. Birro has since then continued to write plays and television scripts.

His younger brother Marcus Birro is also an author and a poet.

Birro lives in Stockholm, Sweden with his wife Christina and their family. He has one daughter, one son and two stepsons.
