= Helena Frith Powell =

Helena Frith Powell is an author and a columnist.

Frith Powell was born in Sweden to a Swedish mother and an Italian father. She studied at Durham University, where she wrote for Palatinate and also served on the Fashion Show committee. She writes the 'French Mistress' column in The Sunday Times about living in France and has also contributed to Tatler and Harper's.

== Selected works ==
- Ciao Bella: In Search of My Italian Father was written when she moved to France, where she lived with her family for five years.
- Two Lipsticks and a Lover (2007) is about the secrets behind French style and taste. Two Lipsticks and a Lover has been bought by Penguin in the US and Arrow in the UK for paperback publication. The book is published in America as All You Need to Be Impossibly French.
- More More France Please continues to explore what it is like to live in France.
- Love in a Warm Climate: A Novel About the French Art of Love was published by Gibson Square in March 2011.
