= Daniele Zotti =

Belgian footballer

Personal information
- Date of birth: 23 February 1997 (age 29)
- Place of birth: Genk, Belgium
- Height: 1.77 m (5 ft 10 in)
- Position: Centre-back

Team information
- Current team: KVK Wellen
- Number: 12

Youth career
- Patro Eisden
- –2014: Valenciennes
- 2014–2016: Genk

Senior career*
Years	Team	Apps	(Gls)
2016–2017	Patro Eisden	17	(0)
2017–2019	Roda JC	9	(0)
2020–2023	Bocholt VV	42	(1)
2023–2025	KVK Beringen		
2025–	KVK Wellen	0	(0)
- * Club domestic league appearances and goals as of 08:13, 25 January 2026 (UTC)

Daniele Zotti (born 23 February 1997) is a Belgian footballer who plays as a centre back for KVK Wellen. He has Italian descent.

== Club career ==
He made his Eerste Divisie debut for Roda JC Kerkrade on 26 October 2018 in a game against Jong AZ, as a starter.
