= Lorenzo Lai =

Belgian footballer (born 1985)

Personal information
- Date of birth: 2 June 1985 (age 41)
- Place of birth: Mons, Belgium
- Height: 1.68 m (5 ft 6 in)
- Position: Midfielder

Team information
- Current team: Beloeil

Senior career*
| Years | Team | Apps | (Gls) |
| 2002–2005 | Mouscron | 8 | (0) |
| 2005–2006 | Mons | 14 | (0) |
| 2006–2009 | La Louvière | 0 | (0) |
| 2009–2012 | Boussu Dour Borinage | 70 | (0) |
| 2014 | Thulin | | |
| 2014–2022 | Francs Borains | | |
| 2022– | Beloeil | | |
- * Club domestic league appearances and goals

Lorenzo Lai (born 2 June 1985) is a Belgian professional footballer who plays as a midfielder for Belgian First Provincial club Beloeil.

== Career ==
Starting his career with Mouscron, Lai made his professional debut on 21 December 2002, coming on as a substitute in the 60th minute for Paul Alo'o in the 3–1 home win in the Belgian Pro League against Mechelen. In 2005, he moved to hometown club Mons where he made 10 appearances in his sole season at the club. Three seasons with La Louvière followed, before Lai signed with Boussu Dour Borinage in 2009, the club that would later become Francs Borains. He made more than 70 appearances for the club the next three seasons in the second and third tiers.

Between 2012 and 2014, Lai played in the lower tiers of Belgian football for Thulin, before returning to Francs Borains in 2014, who had just undergone a merger. He helped the club from the Belgian Fourth Division to the Belgian First Amateur Division during his spell at the club, and captained the side.

In May 2022, Lai left Francs Borains after eight years to join Belgian First Provincial club Beloeil.

== Honours ==
Mons

- Belgian Second Division: 2005–06

Francs Borains

- Belgian Second Amateur Division: 2019–20
