= Alexandra Zazzi =

Swedish chef, journalist and television presenter

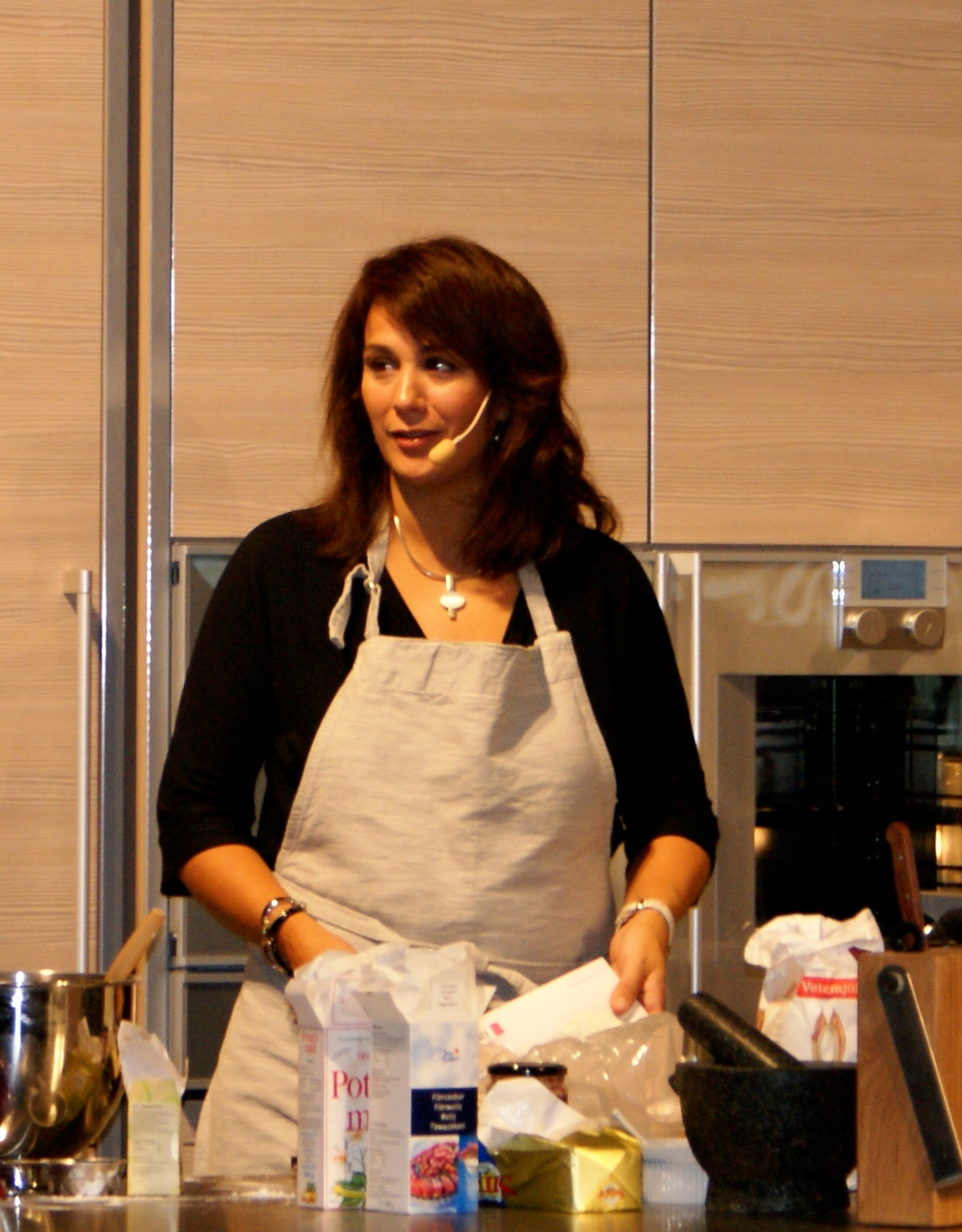
- Alexandra Zazzi during the Göteborg Book Fair in September 2009
- Born: 7 June 1966 (age 59); Rapallo, Liguria, Italy
- Occupations: Chef, journalist, television presenter

Maria Alexandra Paula Louise Jademyr Zazzi (born 7 June 1966) is a Swedish chef, journalist and television host.

== Career ==
Zazzi was born in 1966 in Rapallo, Italy. In 1998, Zazzi gained fame after winning season two of the reality show Expedition Robinson 1998, also known as Survivor, becoming the first female winner of the show.

After her victory, she became a television host for cooking shows like Köket on TV4 and Meny on Sveriges Radio P1. She has also been a reporter for Spårlöst försvunnen on TV3 and a guest on many other radio and television programs since 1998. Zazzi is also a journalist writing about food for several Swedish magazines. She is a columnist on the Göteborgs-Posten newspaper and also in Matmagasinet. She is the owner of a restaurant.

== Bibliography ==
- Sunt med Zazzi (2005). ISBN 91-27-35633-7
- Torsdagarna med Zazzi: filosofi, känsla och kärlek till mat (2008). ISBN 978-91-85617-07-4
- Zazzis pasta (2003). ISBN 91-27-35506-3
- Zazzis mat: med smak av Italien (2005) ISBN 91-27-35642-6
- Grytboken: fyrtiofem recept av kända och okända svenska matkonstnärer (1999). ISBN 91-630-8804-5

== Awards ==
- Winner of Expedition Robinson 1998
- Winner of Riksmästerskapet i matlagning 2006
