= Alexandre Ippolito =

Belgian footballer

Personal information
- Date of birth: 5 January 1999 (age 27)
- Place of birth: Belgium
- Height: 1.70 m (5 ft 7 in)
- Position: Winger

Team information
- Current team: CS Entité Manageoise
- Number: 11

Senior career*
Years	Team	Apps	(Gls)
2019–2021	Mouscron	4	(0)
2021–2022	Wiltz 71	20	(1)
2022–2023	RAEC Mons		
2023–2025	La Louvière Centre	43	(4)
2025–	CS Entité Manageoise	0	(0)
- * Club domestic league appearances and goals as of 16 January 2026

Alexandre Ippolito (born 5 January 1999) is a Belgian professional footballer who plays as a winger for CS Entité Manageoise.

== Professional career ==
Ippolito debut for Mouscron in a 3-2 Belgian First Division A loss to Cercle Brugge K.S.V. on 6 April 2019. On 4 November 2019, Ippolito signed his first professional contract with Mouscron.
