= Luigi Verderame =

Belgian singer

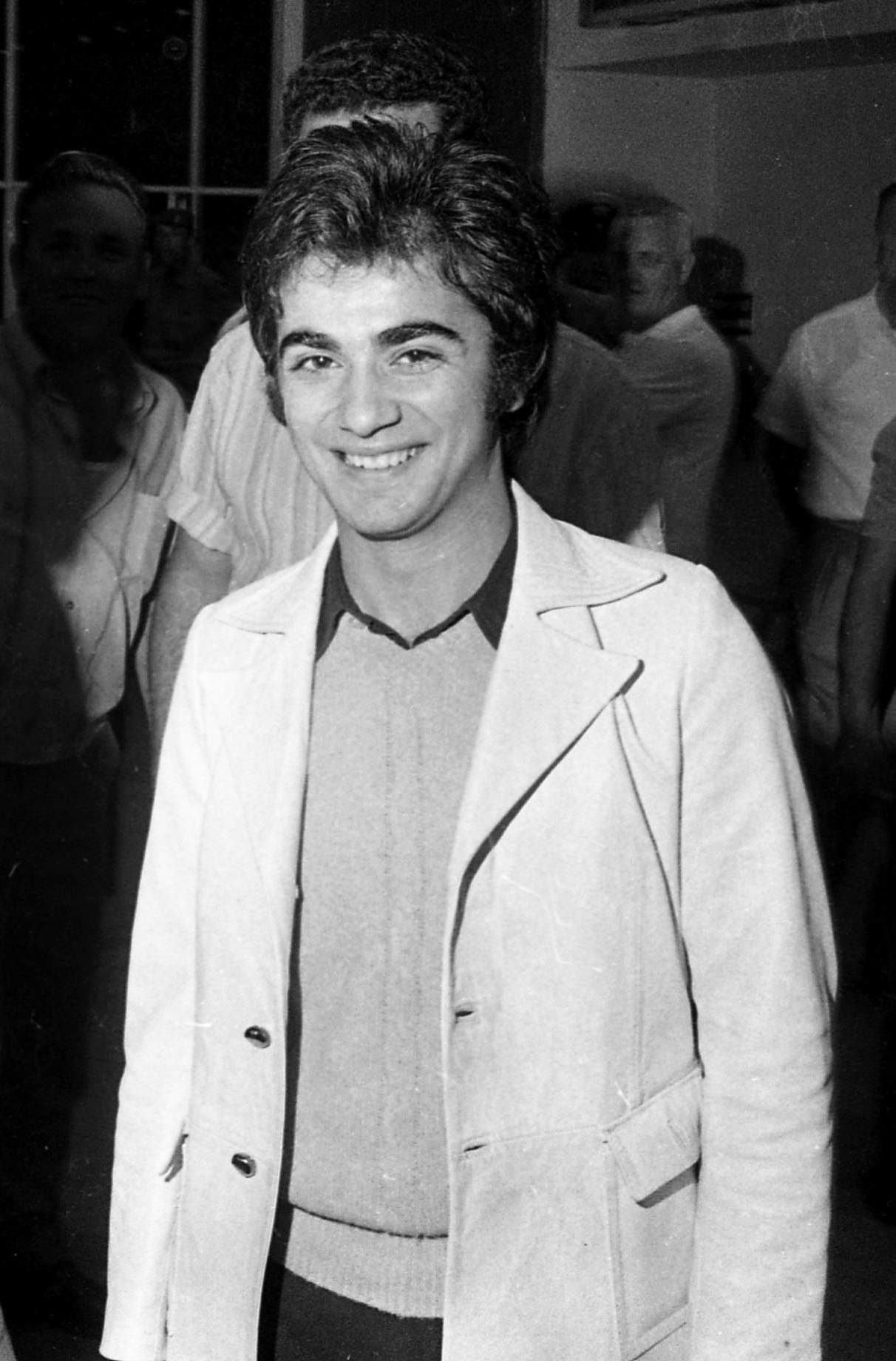
Luigi Verderame

Luigi Verderame, usually known just as Luigi, is a Belgian singer, popular internationally in the late 1960s and early 1970s. He sang mainly in French, but he also sang in Italian, Hebrew, Turkish and English. His most well known hits are Une Maman (1964) and Pitie (1967).

== Childhood ==
Luigi was born on July 9, 1950, in a small town near Liège, Belgium to parents that immigrated from Sicily. Luigi had three older brothers, and three sisters, and all of them were taught to enjoy singing and music. At the age of 8 Luigi learned to read sheet-music, and to play the clarinet and guitar. His three older brothers formed a band that played in cinemas, weddings and parties in their vicinity. In 1963, little Luigi (then only 13) joined his brothers' band as the lead singer to sing in a band competition.

== Fame ==
In 1964, when Luigi was only 14, he recorded the song Une Maman (a mother, in French), which became a huge hit in Belgium and the rest of Europe, as well as in Turkey and in the Middle East. Because his surname was considered long and hard to remember, he became famous as just Luigi.

In the following two years, Luigi released several other songs to the hit parades: Quand j'ai achete ma guitare (When I bought my guitar), L'automne (The autumn), Apres tant d'annees (After many years), Main dans la main (Hand in hand), Suzy et Jo (Suzy and Jo), and Nadine. In 1966, he toured Turkey's major cities, with a big success. He recorded his hit Nadine in Turkish as "Sensiz" i.e. without you.

In 1967, he recorded his second huge hit, Pitie (Pity). By then a mega-star in several countries, he went on long performance tours in Romania, Lebanon, Syria, and, at December 1968, Israel.

The 18-year-old Luigi toured Israel with his three brothers, and received the treatment of a mega-star, performing in packed halls in front of ecstatic crowds, and fussed over by the media, which called him "the new teenage idol". He received such a warm welcome that he decided to return to Israel a few months later (after another tour of Lebanon and Syria). The publisher of his albums in Israel raised the idea that Luigi record Hebrew versions of his hit songs; Luigi, who did not know that language but had an extraordinary talent for languages, enthusiastically took up the offer, and in February 1969 he released an album with four of his biggest hits in Hebrew, and later recorded more of his hits in Hebrew. He continued to tour Europe, but returned to Israel often and started learning the Hebrew language. In December 1969, he topped the Israeli charts with an original hit in Hebrew 12 שעות written by Nurit Hirsh and Ehud Manor. In 1970, he also recorded English versions of a few popular Israeli songs.
