= Roberto Vacchi =

Italian-Swedish retired racing cyclist and a sports commentator

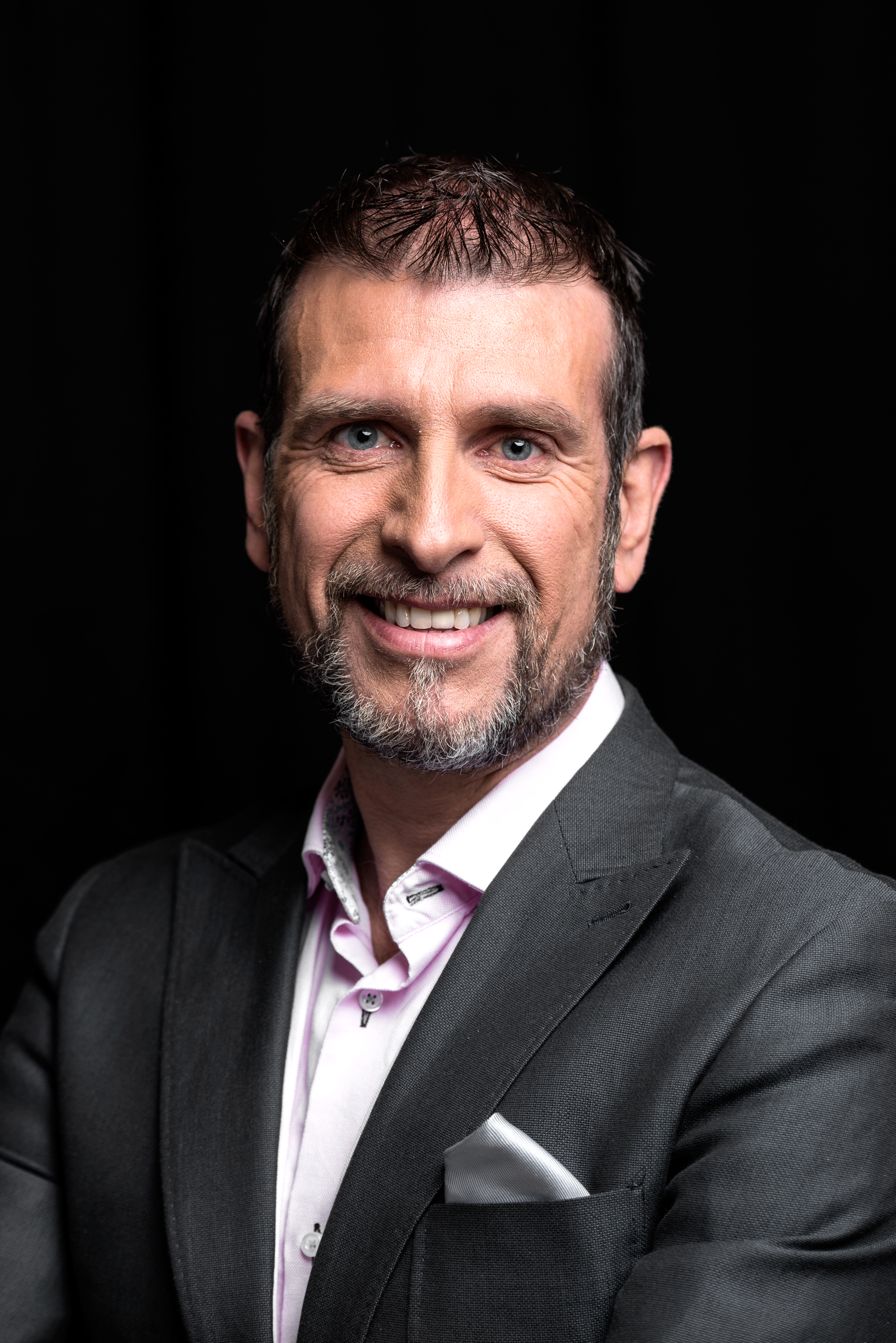
- Roberto Vacchi in 2014

Personal information
- Full name: Roberto Vacchi
- Born: 28 November 1965 (age 60) Stockholm, Sweden

Cycling career
- Sport: Cycling
- Role: Rider; Commentator

Roberto Ivano Luca Vacchi (born 28 November 1965, Stockholm) is an Italian-Swedish retired racing cyclist and a sports commentator on Eurosport. He commentates cross-country skiing and a variety of other sports, but is most known for his cycling coverage together with Anders Adamson. Vacchi also works as an announcer at the Swedish national football team's home matches, Vasaloppet, Royal Palace Sprint and other events.

== Biography ==
Vacchi was born in Stockholm in 1965 to Italian parents who had emigrated to Sweden in the 1950s. At the age of 9, his family moved back to Italy to La Spezia where he discovered competitive cycling. After a few years in Italy they moved back to Sweden. There he continued his career in cycling with Hammarby IF (1978–79) and Spårvägens GoIF (1980–1991). In 1992, he joined Västerås CK, where he ended his career.

In 1993, while working for the Swedish Cycling Association, Eurosport approached Vacchi with an offer to commentate cycling on TV. In the beginning he did not comment much, but eventually it became a full-time job. He credited Bengt Grive as his mentor during the first years at Eurosport.

Vacchi is known for his enthusiastic commentary on cycling races and for his vast knowledge of the sport as well as being able to give detailed geographical, cultural and historical information on places around the tours.

Vacchi also works as the press director for the Swedish Ski Association and as the editor-in-chief of the cross-country skiing magazine Glid.
