= Andréa Schifano =

Belgian footballer

Andrea Schifano
Personal information
- Full name: Andrea Schifano
- Date of birth: 10 December 1991 (age 34)
- Place of birth: Mons, Belgium
- Height: 1.80 m (5 ft 11 in)
- Position: Midfielder

Team information
- Current team: AC Arles-Avignon
- Number: 21

Youth career
- 2003–2005: RC Lens
- 2005–2009: RAEC Mons

Senior career*
Years	Team	Apps	(Gls)
2009	Excelsior Mouscron	3	(0)
2010–	AC Arles-Avignon		
- * Club domestic league appearances and goals as of 20:50, 11 November 2009 (UTC)

Andrea Schifano (born 10 December 1991) is a Belgian professional football player, who currently plays in the Ligue 2 for AC Arles-Avignon.

== Career ==
Schifano began his career in the youth side with French club RC Lens and signed later for RAEC Mons. He played for RAEC Mons between June 2009 now signed his first professional contract for R.E. Mouscron. On 15 January 2010 Ligue 2 club Arles signed the Belgian forward on a free transfer.
