= Italians in France =

French citizens of Italian descent

Italian French
Italo-francesi (Italian) Italo-français (French)
- Napoleon Bonaparte, one the most notable Italian French personality who turned France into a military dictatorship

Total population
- c. 6,000,000 (by ancestry, about 10% of the total French population including corsicans); Residents of France born in Italy; 470,032 Italian citizens in France (2024)

Regions with significant populations
- Paris, Lyon, Lille, Strasbourg, Lorraine, Southeastern France (Provence, Savoy, Corsica and Nice have autochthonous Italian populations), Southwestern France

Languages
- French and French dialects · Italian and Italian dialects

Religion
- Roman Catholicism, Judaism

Related ethnic groups
- Italians, Italian Belgians, Italian Britons, Italian Finns, Italian Germans, Italian Romanians, Italian Spaniards, Italian Swedes, Italian Swiss, Corfiot Italians, Genoese in Gibraltar, Italians of Crimea, Italians of Odesa, Italian Canadians

Italian French (Italian: italo-francesi; French: italo-français) are French-born citizens who are fully or partially of Italian descent, whose ancestors were Italians who emigrated to France during the Italian diaspora, or Italian-born people in France.

Italian migration into what is today France has been going on, in different migrating cycles, for centuries, beginning in prehistoric times right to the modern age. In addition, Corsica passed from the Republic of Genoa to France in 1768, and the county of Nice and Savoy from the Kingdom of Sardinia to France in 1860.

About 6 million French nationals are of Italian origin, corresponding to about 10% of the total population (including Corsicans).

== History of Italians in France ==
=== Middle Ages and Renaissance ===
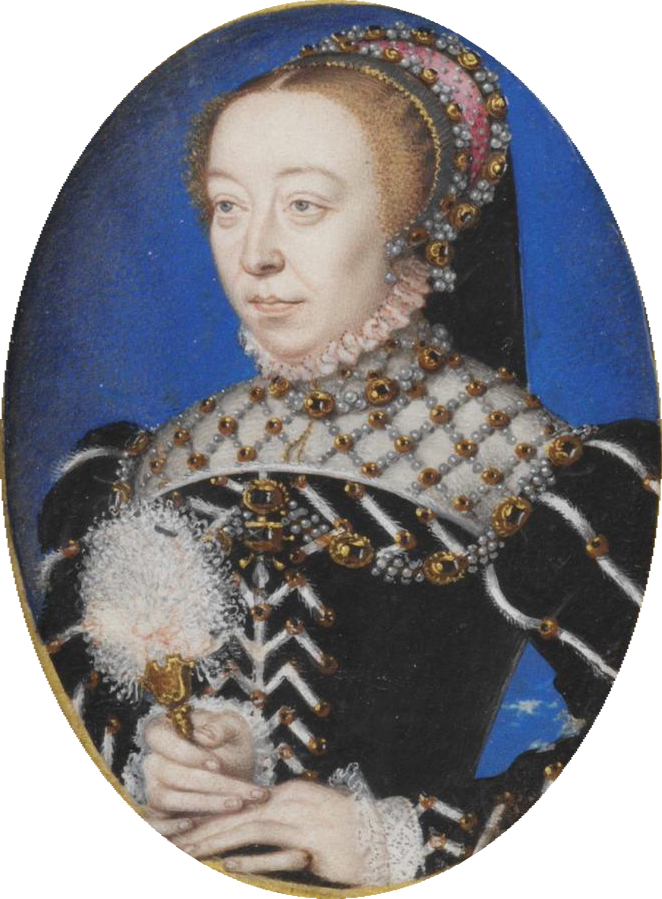
Catherine de' Medici

There has always been migration, since ancient times, between what is today Italy and France. This is especially true of the regions of northwestern Italy and southeastern France. As Italian wealth and influence grew during the Middle Ages, many Florentine, Genoese and Venetian traders, bankers and artisans settled, usually through family branches, throughout France. Regions of significant Italian diaspora sprang up as far north as Paris and Flanders. However it was not much as a percentage of the French global population.

This Italian migration developed more through the Renaissance, as previous generations became assimilated. Italian artists, writers and architects were called upon by the French monarchy and aristocrats, leading to a significant interchange of culture, but it was not a massive immigration of popular classes. The 17th and 18th centuries were the era of the Italian dancers, musicians, commedia dell'arte troupes and actors of the theatre Hôtel de Bourgogne.

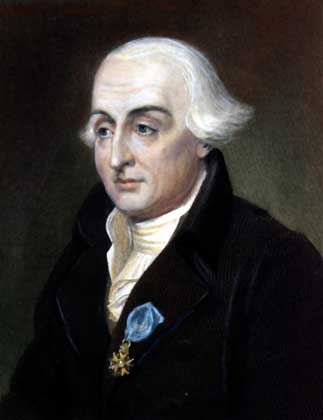
Joseph-Louis Lagrange

Since the 16th century, Florence and its citizens have long enjoyed a very close relationship with France. In 1533, at the age of 14, Catherine de' Medici married Henry, the second son of King Francis I and Queen Claude of France. Under the gallicised version of her name, Catherine de Médicis, became Queen consort of France when Henry ascended to the throne in 1547. Later on, after Henry died, she became regent on behalf of her 10-year-old son King Charles IX and was granted sweeping powers. After Charles died in 1574, Catherine played a key role in the reign of her third son, Henry III.

Other notable examples of Italians that played a major role in the history of France include Cardinal Mazarin, born in Pescina was a cardinal, diplomat and politician, who served as the chief minister of France from 1642 until his death in 1661. Mazarin succeeded his mentor, Cardinal Richelieu, and extended France's political ambitions not only within Italy but towards England as well.

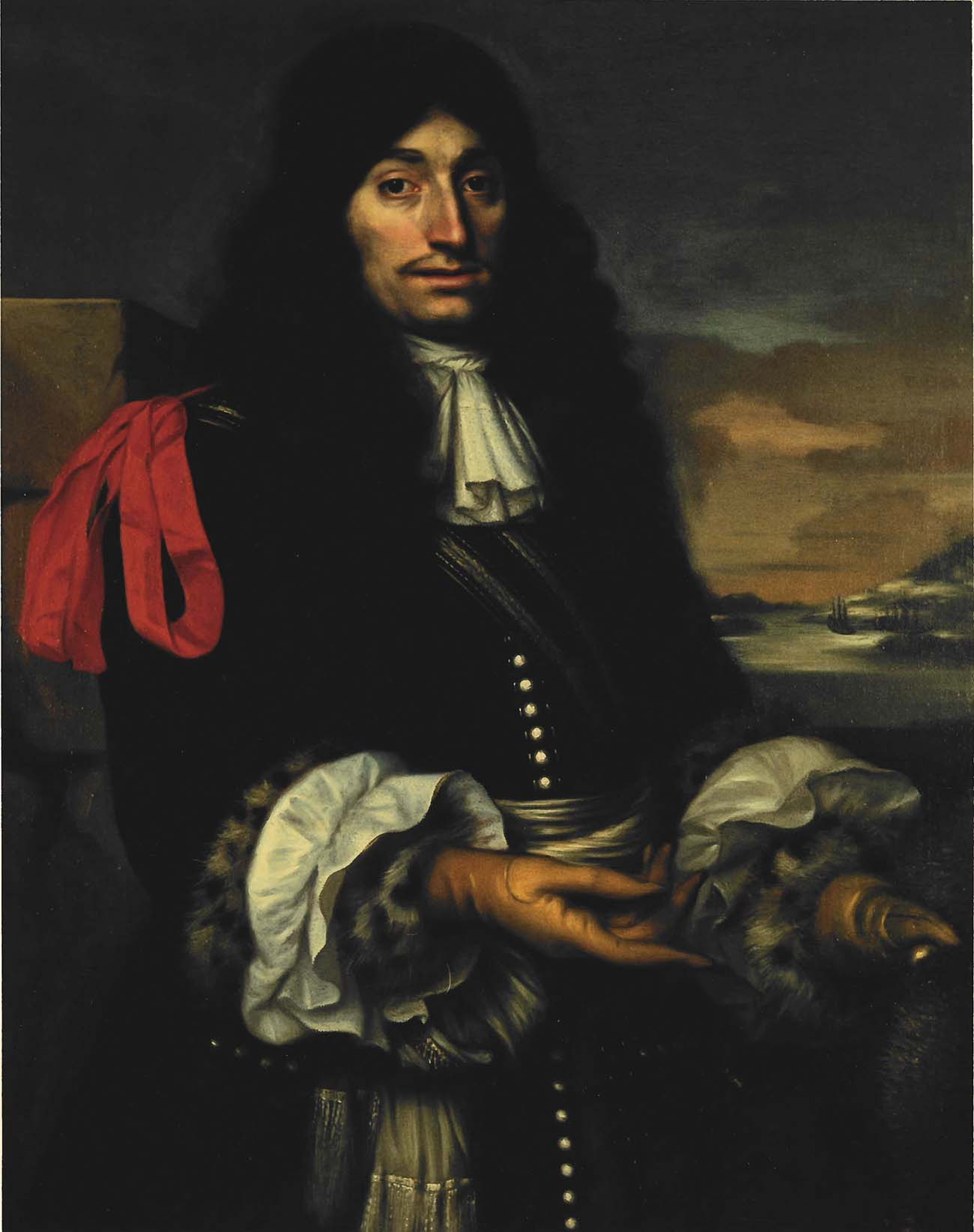
Henri de Tonti

Enrico Tonti, born near Gaeta, Italy (c. 1649–1704) was a soldier, explorer, and fur trader in the service of France. He was the son of Lorenzo de Tonti, a financier and former governor of Gaeta. Enrico was second in command of the La Salle expedition on his descent of the Mississippi River. Tonti's letters and journals are valuable source materials on these explorations.

Enrico's brother, Pierre Alphonse de Tonti, or Alphonse de Tonty, Baron de Paludy (c. 1659–1727) was an officer who served under the French explorer Cadillac and helped establish the first European settlement at Detroit, Michigan, Fort Pontchartrain du Detroit on the Detroit River in 1701. Several months later, both Cadillac and Tonty brought their wives to the fort, making them the first European women to travel into the interior of North America. He was the son of Lorenzo de Tonti who was a financier and former governor of Gaeta. Lorenzo de Tonti was the inventor of the form of life insurance known as the tontine. Henri de Tonti, involved in La Salle's exploration of the Mississippi River and the establishment of the first settlement in Arkansas, was his older son.

=== Modern period ===
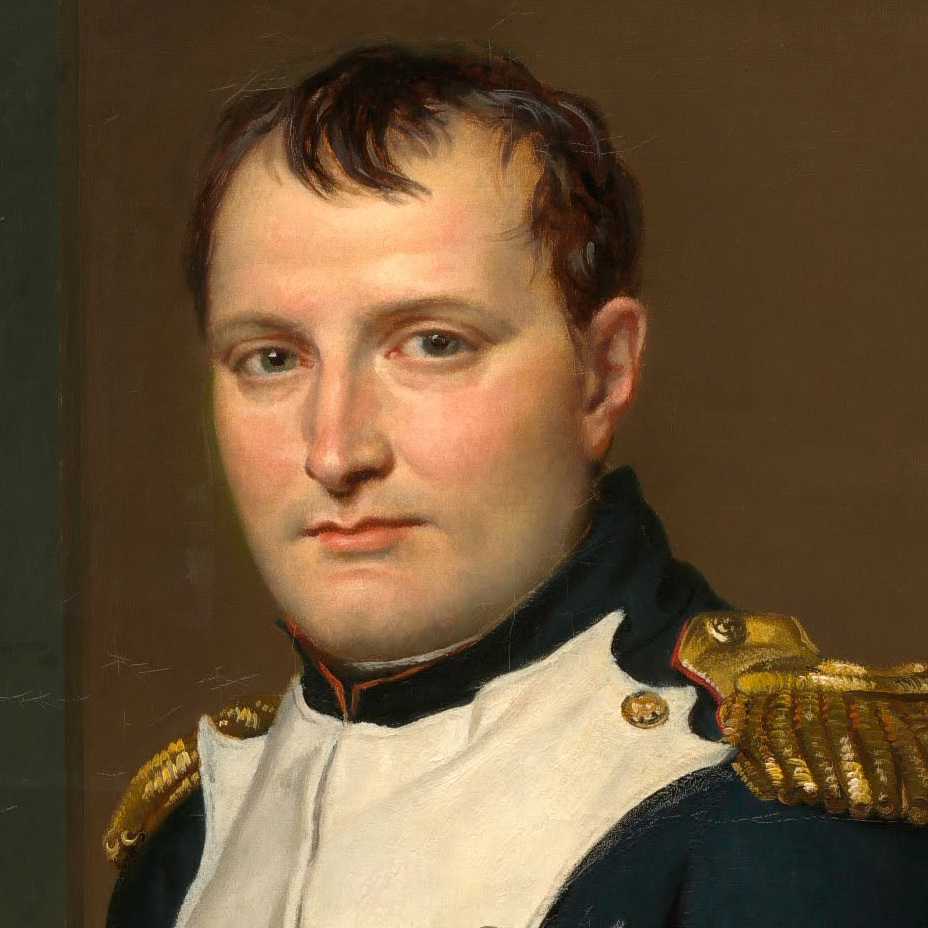
Napoleon Bonaparte

Napoleon Bonaparte, French military dictator, general, and eventual emperor, was ethnically Italian of Corsican origin, whose family was of Genoese and Tuscan ancestry. Italian popular immigration to France only began in the late 18th century, really developed from the end of the 19th century until World War I, and became quite massive after this war. France needed workforce to compensate for the war losses and its very low birthrate. It was in the second half of the 19th century that Italian immigration to France assumed the connotations of a mass phenomenon. A census of the residents of the foreign community carried out in 1851 by the French authorities revealed that out of about 380,000 foreign residents, 63,000 were Italians (Piedmontese in primis). The number of Italians residing in France grew rapidly throughout the 19th century reaching the number of 165,000 in 1876 and 240,000 in 1881. It was from this date that Italian immigration to France began to decrease. The main causes were the economic recession that characterized the French economy in this period and the poor diplomatic relations between the two countries, due to the Tunisian question. The diplomatic crisis was further fueled by Italy's entry into the Triple Alliance in 1882.

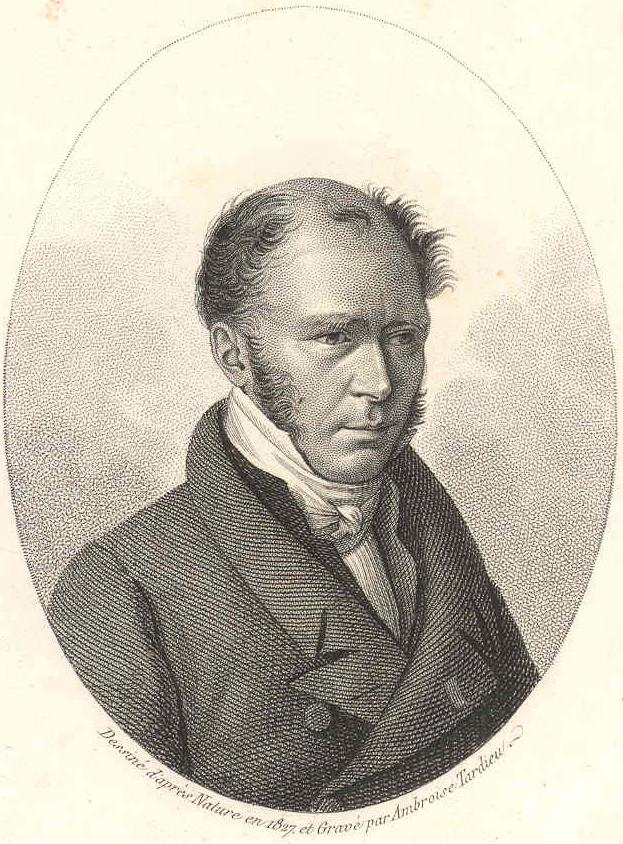
Henri Cassini

At the end of the 19th century it was quite common for Italian immigrants to send their children back to Italy until they were 12, before taking them back to France. To satisfy the requirements of the civil status, which then required choosing names from the French calendar, they called their children, for example, Albert and Marie, but, in the family context, everyone called them Alberto and Maria. At the beginning of the 20th century, the Italian community became the first resident foreign community in the country, with almost 500,000 people in 1911. The eastern suburbs of Paris, for example, were distinguished by a very high concentration of Italians in Clichy, Levallois-Perret, Puteaux and Suresnes. Until the eve of World War I, the cause of Italian immigration to France was essentially economic. In France, there was a shortage of manpower, especially in agriculture and industry (factories and mines) and construction. French demands for Italian labor grew at the end of World War I.

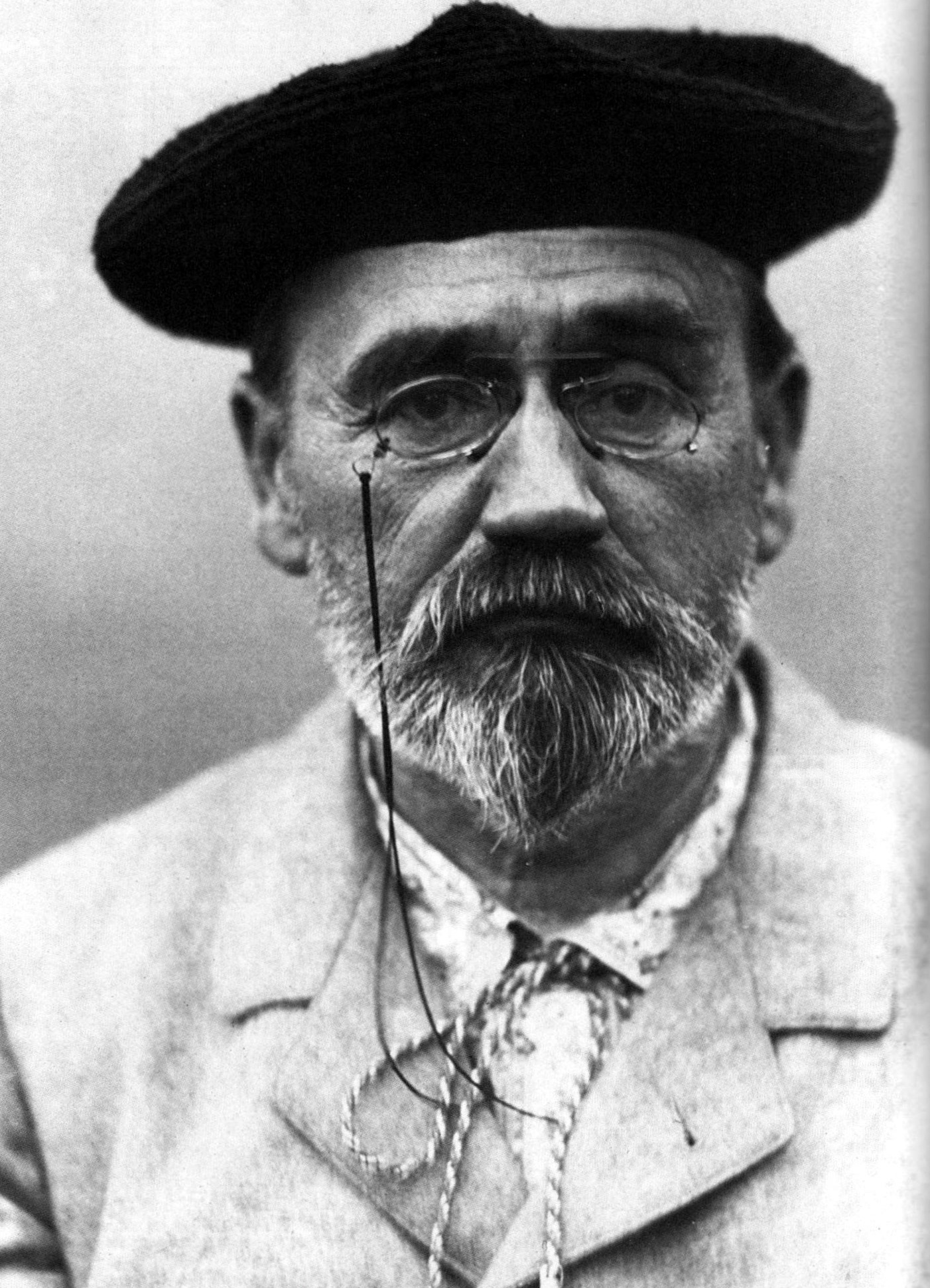
Émile Zola

With the advent of fascism in Italy, emigration of political origin was added to economic emigration. During the 1920s there were many Italian politicians from various backgrounds who were forced to take refuge in France, including Eugenio Chiesa, Filippo Turati, Gaetano Salvemini, Carlo Rosselli, Nello Rosselli, Giuseppe Saragat, Pietro Nenni, Sandro Pertini and many others. But paradoxically there were also, albeit few, supporters of the fascist regime, such as the writer Pitigrilli, OVRA agent in Turin and Paris. In 1938, the French section of the National Fascist Party had only 3,000 members, represented by Nicola Bonservizi, assassinated in 1924 by an Italian anarchist in exile. The fascist regime intended to preserve the "Italian character" of the immigrants, wanting to prevent the assimilation of their compatriots by France. Thus he worked to promote patriotic exaltation by creating more than 200 sections of the National Association of Italian Veterans in French cities, placing the Italian associations under the control of the consulates, bringing together the peasants within cooperatives that depended on the Italian banks. On the contrary, the anti-fascists encouraged immigrants to integrate into French society by participating in social and political struggles alongside trade union organizations.

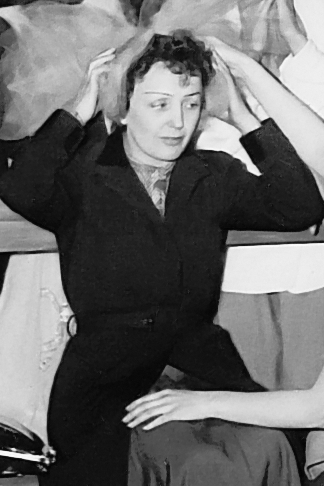
Édith Piaf

In 1931, the Italian community in France numbered over 800,000 residents, but the flow was cut short by the outbreak of World War II. At the end of the latter, migrations from Italy resumed, but they were much less important than those recorded at the end of the 19th century and the beginning of the 20th century. Starting from the 1940s, there was a decline in the number of Italian residents, due to mass naturalizations and the increase in the number of repatriations. In fact, the naturalizations carried out from 1927 to 1940 pursuant to the law of 10 August 1927 on citizenship concerned, for more than half of them, people born in Italy, or almost 260,000 people. Of these, almost 4,500 people were deprived of their French citizenship following the law of 22 July 1940, which accounted for almost a third of the disqualifications pronounced under this law promulgated by the Vichy regime.

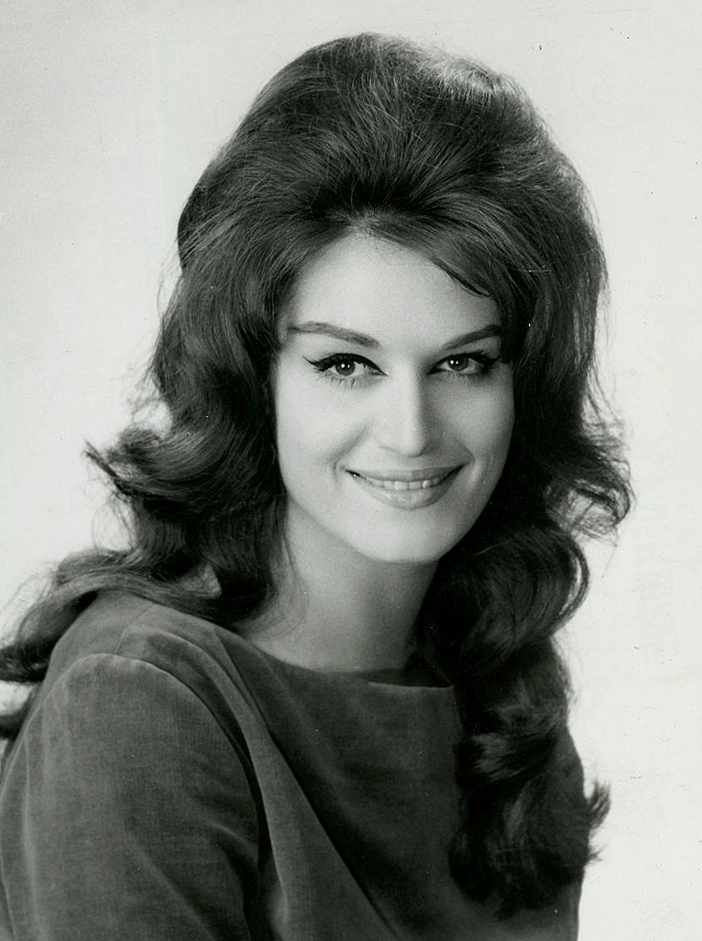
Dalida

In 1946, after the end of World War II, the number of Italians decreased to 450,000, then rose to 570,000 in 1968, before falling again to 460,000 in 1975 and 350,000 in 1981. In the following decades, the phenomenon of Italian immigration to France decreased considerably and changed its aspect. If immigration at the beginning of the 20th century consisted mainly of peasants, miners and workers, from the years of the Italian economic miracle more qualified workers began to flow. Furthermore, many Italians who already lived in the country rose socially, exercising free professions, entrepreneurs and traders, or restaurateurs.

Initially, Italian immigration to modern France (late 18th to the early 20th century) came predominantly from northern Italy (Piedmont, Veneto), then from central Italy (Marche, Umbria), mostly to the bordering southeastern region of Provence. It was not until after World War II that large numbers of immigrants from southern Italy immigrated to France, usually settling in industrialised areas of France, such as Lorraine, Paris and Lyon.

== Demographics ==
=== Regional origin and distribution on French territory ===
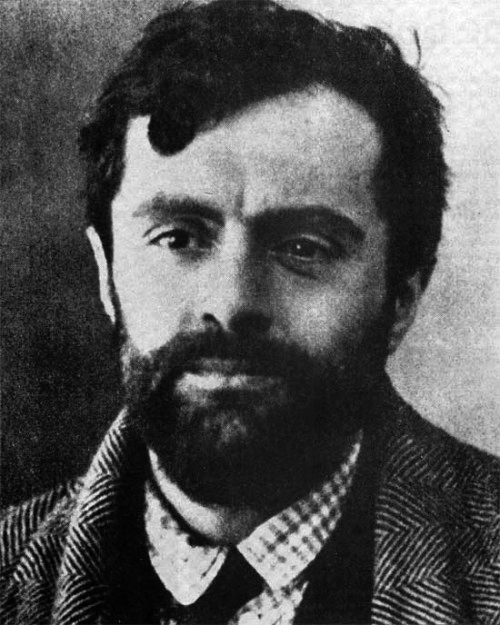
Amedeo Modigliani

As regards the regional origin of Italian immigrants and their descendants in France, it is necessary to make a division by periods. From the end of the 19th century until the eve of World War II, the Italian regions that provided the largest number of migrants were those of the North, first of all Piedmont, followed in order by Tuscany, Lombardy, Veneto, Friuli-Venezia Giulia and Emilia-Romagna. In the case of Piedmont it was above all seasonal immigration due to geographical proximity. In contrast, Italian immigration after World War II saw a growth in the migratory component from the Southern regions, particularly Sicily, Calabria and Apulia.

The areas of greatest concentration of Italian immigration to France were the departments of Normandy, Alsace, Rhône, Loire, Isère, Moselle, Île-de-France (mainly in Paris and Seine-Saint-Denis, Val-d'Oise and Val-de-Marne), Nord-Pas-de-Calais, Bouches-du-Rhône, Savoie and Haute-Savoie, Lot-et-Garonne, Var, Alpes-Maritimes and Corsica. In these last two regions the Italian immigration was favored not only by the geographical proximity, but also by the ethnic and linguistic affinity with their own inhabitants, Corsica was also influenced in its history by Sardinia, Tuscany and Liguria, and Italian was the official language of Corsica until 1853. The main cities with a large Italian immigrant community were Strasbourg, Paris, Lyon, Marseille, Nice and Grenoble, cities that still host the largest Italian-French communities today (40,000 Sicilians in Grenoble in 2007). The Lorient region also experienced considerable Italian immigration during the interwar period; at the time, "Italian houses" were built in large numbers.

=== Statistics ===
About 5.5 million French nationals are of Italian origin, corresponding to about 8% of the total population. According to data for 2021, the number of Italian citizens residing in France was 444,113.

Number of Italians in France (1851-2001)
Year	1851	1876	1901	1911	1921	1931	1936	1946	1954
Population	63,307	165,313	330,465	419,234	451,000	808,038	720,926	450,764	589,524
Year	1960	1968	1975	1982	1985	1990	1998	1999	2001
Population	688,474	571,694	462,940	333,740	293,000	252,759	212,023	201,670	198,344

== Prejudice and discrimination against Italians in France ==
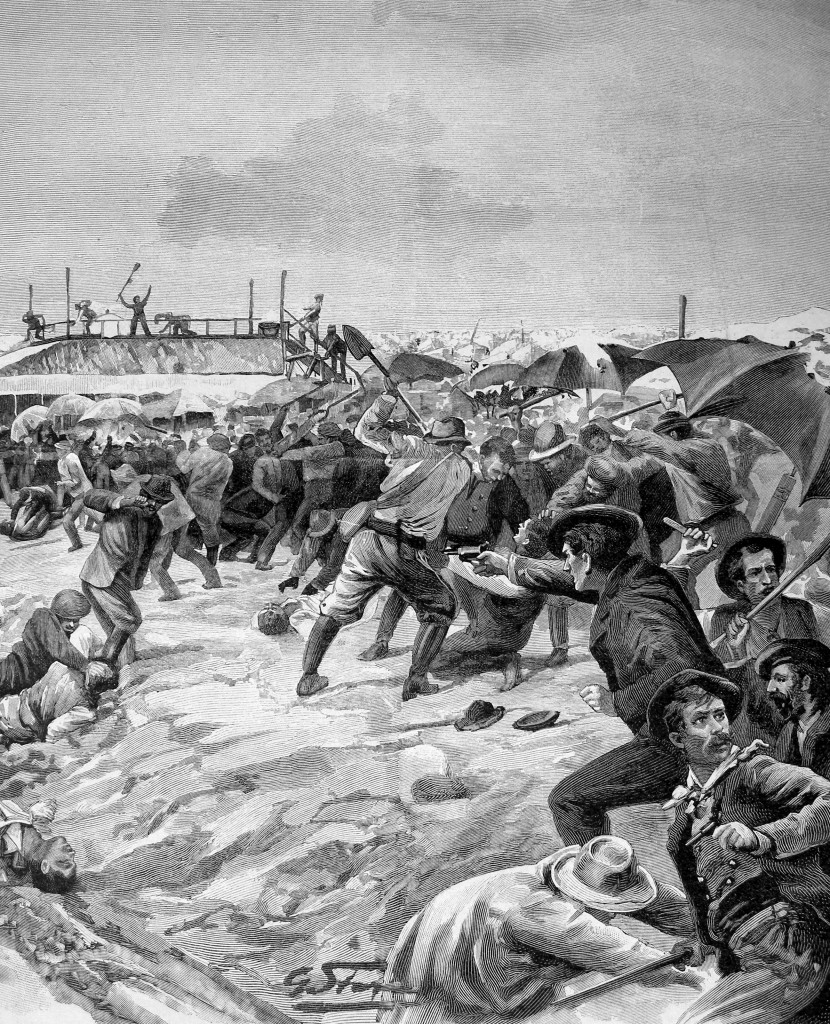
Massacre of Italians at Aigues-Mortes

Italians living in France have never reported themselves as particularly perpetrators of criminal or even criminal acts, except since the 1950s, when Italian mafia-type criminal organizations began to establish themselves in the country (Provence-Alpes-Côte d'Azur, Grenoble [the Italo-Grenoblois], Paris).

On the other hand, Italian immigrant workers were at times the object of violent hostility on the part of the local populations for reasons of labor competition. Most notable was the massacre of Italians at Aigues-Mortes in Provence which took place between 16 and 20 August 1893, where a mob of angry French workers violently assaulted Italians they believed to be undercutting their wages and taking jobs in the salt works. The official death toll stood at nine, but according to other sources, such as the British newspaper The Times, 50 Italians were killed. An earlier incident occurred on 17 June 1881 in Marseille, where 15,000 Frenchmen attempted to attack an Italian club. Four days of clashes followed with the harsh reaction of the Italians, which ended with three dead, 21 wounded and 200 arrests. Meanwhile, in 1882, four Italian workers in the Beaucaire blast furnaces were killed by the local population.

There were many derogatory terms used by the French, the best known being macaroni, i.e. spaghetti eater, and rital. Today almost all the descendants of the ancient Italian immigrations are assimilated and episodes of anti-Italianism are rare.

== Culture ==
=== Language ===
Arriving in France, the Italian immigrants mainly spoke the Italian language. However the majority were bilingual, speaking a regional dialect mainly in the family; at the end of the 19th century/beginning of the 20th century, the linguistic unification of Italy was not fully achieved, and therefore it was not uncommon for some immigrants to speak only their regional dialect without being able to speak Italian. In general, Italian immigrants were able to learn French without major difficulties, given the linguistic proximity of the two Latin languages. At the time of the great Italian migratory waves, France had a rather rigid assimilation policy, which forced most of the immigrants and their descendants to abandon their mother tongue in favor of French.

=== Italian French cuisine ===
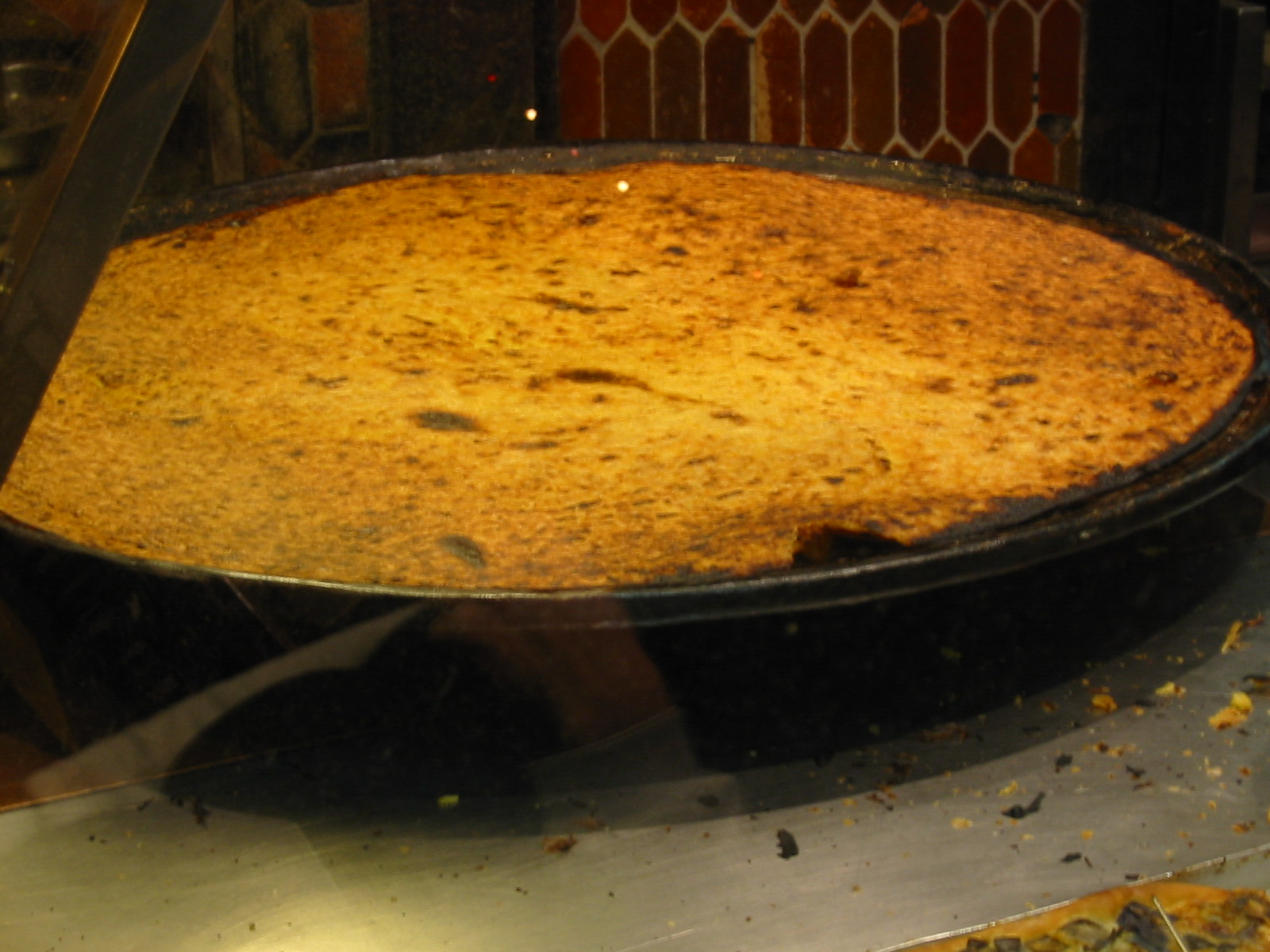
Socca of Nice

Italian cuisine has had a strong influence above all on the cuisine of the French southeastern regions, where the presence and relations with the Italians are very ancient. Provence, the County of Nice, the city of Sète or the Alps have some recipes for this phenomenon. It was Liguria that influenced the most due to its geographical proximity, but southern Italy also brought its share of flavors. Some Italian-French dishes are (in brackets the original names in Italian of the recipes):

- Ravioles du Royans, du Trieves, (ravioli), which would come from Piedmont
- Soupe au pistou (minestrone alla genovese)
- Cade de Toulon/Socca de Nice (farinata)
- Panisse (panissa)
- Pissaladière (piscialandrea / focaccia genovese con le cipolle)
- Salade niçoise (condiglione)
- Barbagiuan de Menton et Monaco (barbagiuai)
- Tourte aux blettes (torta pasqualina ligure)
- Tielle (tiella di Gaeta)
- Macaronade (ragù alla napoletana)
- Brageoles (braciole ou involtini)
- Brandade (brandacujun)

== Autochthonous Italian populations in France ==
A map of the County of Nice showing the area of the Kingdom of Sardinia annexed in 1860 to France (light brown). The area in red had already become part of France before 1860.

Provence, Savoy, Corsica and Nice have autochthonous Italian populations. The Italian language is spoken by a minority in France, especially in the southeastern part of the country.

Italian was the official language in Savoy and in Nice until 1860, when they were both annexed by France from the Kingdom of Sardinia under the Treaty of Turin, a development that triggered the "Niçard exodus", or the emigration of a quarter of the Niçard Italians to Italy, and the Niçard Vespers. Giuseppe Garibaldi complained about the referendum that allowed France to annex Savoy and Nice, and a group of his followers (among the Italian Savoyards) took refuge in Italy in the following years.

Corsica passed from the Republic of Genoa to France in 1769 after the Treaty of Versailles. Italian was the official language of Corsica until 1859. Giuseppe Garibaldi called for the inclusion of the "Corsican Italians" within Italy when Rome was annexed to the Kingdom of Italy, but King Victor Emmanuel II did not agree. Italian is generally understood in Corsica by the population resident therein who speak Corsican, which is an Italo-Romance idiom similar to Tuscan.

Francization occurred in Nice and Corsica cases, and caused a near-disappearance of the Italian language as many of the Italian speakers in these areas migrated to Italy.

== Notable Italian French people ==
The list is organized chronologically, listing Italians in France by birth date periods.

=== First half of the 19th century ===
- Bonaparte family
- Philippe Antoine d'Ornano (1784–1863), general and cousin of Napoleon Bonaparte
- Louis-Auguste Blanqui (1805–1881), politician.
- Henri Cernuschi (Enrico Cernuschi; 1821–1896), banker, journalist, and art collector (born in Milan). His collection is known as the Musée Cernuschi
- Virginia Oldoini (1837–1899), mistress of Emperor Napoleon III
- Léon Gambetta (1838–1882), lawyer and politician (his father was from Genoa)
- Émile Zola (1840–1902), writer and politician (his father, Francesco Zolla, was born in Venice)
- Philippe Solari (1840–1906), artist
- Joseph Galliéni (1849–1916), French officer (father from Lombardy)
- Jean-François Raffaëlli, (1850–1924), artist
- Raoul Pugno (1852–1914), composer, pianist
- Pierre Savorgnan de Brazza (Pietro Paolo Savorgnan di Brazzà; 1852–1905), explorer (born at Castel Gandolfo, near Rome)
- Vincenzo Bellini (1801–1835), Italian-born opera composer
- Gioachino Rossini, (1792–1868) composer

=== Second half of the 19th century ===
- Clément Castelli (1870–1959), Italian-born painter (from Premia, Verbano-Cusio-Ossola region)
- Vincent Scotto (1874–1952), composer
- Ricciotto Canudo (1879–1923), Italian-born writer (from Gioia del Colle)
- Ettore Bugatti (1881–1947), Italian-born automobile designer and manufacturer (from Milan)
- Rembrandt (Annibale) Bugatti (1884–1916), Italian-born sculptor (from Milan)
- Amedeo Clemente Modigliani (1884–1920), Italian-born painter and sculptor (from Livorno)
- Henri Bosco (Fernand Marius Bosco) (1888–1976), novelist
- Michel Carlini (1889–1967), lawyer and politician
- Elsa Schiaparelli (1890–1973), Italian-born fashion designer (from Rome)
- Jean Giono (1895–1970), novelist (Italian ancestry)
- José Corti (José Corticchiato; 1895–1984), publisher
- Lazare Ponticelli (Lazzaro Ponticelli; 1897–2008), Italian-born veteran of the First World War (from Bettola, near Piacenza)
- Paul Belmondo (1898–1982), sculptor (born in Algiers of Italian ancestry)
- Cino Del Duca (1899–1967), Italian-born businessman, film producer and philanthropist (from Montedinove, Ascoli Piceno)
- Guillaume Apollinaire (1880–1918), poet, playwright, short story writer, novelist and art critic (born in Rome)

=== 1900s ===
- Fernand Joseph Désiré Contandin dit Fernandel (1903–1971), actor and singer
- Stéphane Grappelli (Stefano Grappelli; 1908–1997), jazz violinist (his father was from Alatri, near Frosinone)

=== 1910s ===
- Rina Ketty (Rina Pichetto; 1911–1996), Italian-born singer (from Sarzana)
- Marcel Bich (1914–1994), Italian-born manufacturer and co-founder of Bic (from Turin)
- Édith Piaf (Édith Giovanna Gassion; 1915–1963), singer (her mother, Line Marsa, born in Livorno, was of Italian-Berber descent)
- Achille Zavatta (1915–1993), clown
- Léo Ferré (1916–1993), Singer and songwriter
- Henri Betti (1917–2005) composer and pianist (his father is born in Savona and his grandfather is born in Parma).
- Giuseppe Tacca (1917-1984), cyclist
- Claude Barma (1918–1992), director and screenwriter
- Jeanne Modigliani (1918-1984), historian
- Adolphe Deledda (1919-2003), cyclist

=== 1920s ===
- César Baldaccini (1921–1998), sculptor
- Georges Brassens (1921–1981), singer
- Émile Bongiorni (1921–1949), footballer
- Stellio Lorenzi (1921–1990), screenwriter
- Yves Montand (Ivo Livi) (1921–1991), actor and singer
- Roger Grava (1922–1949), footballer
- Serge Reggiani (1922–2004), singer
- Pierre Cardin (Pietro Cardin) (1922–2020), fashion designer
- François Cavanna (1923–2014), author
- Marcel Zanini (1923–2023), jazz musician
- Armand Gatti (1924–2017), also known as Dante Savoir Gatti, poet, author, playwright, director, screenwriter, producer, journalist
- Michel Piccoli (1925–2020), actor
- Raphaël Géminiani (born 1925), cyclist
- Philippe Castelli (1926–2006), actor
- Marcel Azzola (1927–2019), accordionist
- Remo Forlani (1927–2009), writer and screenwriter
- Emmanuelle Riva (1927–2017), actress
- Albert Uderzo (1927–2020), comic author
- Daniel Filipacchi (born 1928), photographer, art collector and publisher
- Jean Dotto (1928-2000), cyclist
- Willy Rizzo (1928–2013), photographer and designer
- Luc Ferrari (1929–2005), composer
- Claude Nougaro (1929–2004), jazz singer and poet

=== 1930s ===
- Bernard Stasi (1930–2011), politician
- Robert Enrico (1931–2001), film director
- Roger Piantoni (1931–2018), footballer
- Annie Fratellini (1932–1997), circus artist, clown, singer and film actress
- Francesca Solleville (born 1932), singer
- Paul Virilio (1932–2018), philosopher, cultural theorist and urbanist
- Max Gallo (1932–2017), writer, historian and politician
- Pierre Milza (1932–2018), historian
- Jean-Paul Belmondo (born 1933), actor
- Loris Azzaro, (1933–2003), fashion designer and perfumer, born in Tunisia to Sicilian parents.
- Dalida (Iolanda Cristina Gigliotti) (1933–1987), singer, actress and Miss Egypt 1954.
- Emanuel Ungaro (1933–2019), fashion designer
- Nino Ferrer (Nino Agostino Arturo Maria Ferrari) (1934–1998), singer
- Lucien Bianchi (1934–1969), racing driver
- Pia Colombo (Eliane Marie Amélie) (1934–1986), singer
- Claude Faraldo (1936–2008), actor, screenwriter and film director
- Bruno Gigliotti (Orlando) (born 1936), music producer
- Christiane Martel (born 1936), actress and Miss Universe 1953
- Eugène Saccomano (1936–2019), journalist, author
- Claude François (1939–1978), singer and songwriter
- Michèle Mercier (born 1939), actress
- Liliane Montevecchi (1932–2018), actress, dancer, and singer

=== 1940s ===
- Raymond Forni (1941–2008), politician
- Catherine Tasca (born 1941), politician
- Gilbert Bellone (born 1942), cyclist
- Edwige Fenech (born 1948), actor and film producer
- Jean-François Mattei (born 1943), doctor and politician
- Jean-Louis Bianco (born 1943), politician
- Pino Presti (born 1943), musician, composer and producer
- Luc Merenda (born 1943), actor
- Gérard Rinaldi (1943–2012), actor and singer
- Walter Spanghero (born 1943), rugby player
- Jean-Pierre Castaldi (born 1944), actor
- Nicole Grisoni, also known as Nicoletta (born 1944), singer
- Michel Gérard Joseph Colucci (Coluche) (1944–1986), humorist
- Daniel Bevilacqua (Christophe) (1945–2020), singer
- Jean-Claude Izzo (1945–2000), writer
- Patrick Modiano (born 1945), writer
- Richard Cocciante (Riccardo) (born 1946), singer
- Alice Donadel, also known as Alice Dona (born 1946), singer
- Hervé Forneri, also known as Dick Rivers (1946–2019), singer
- Hubert Falco (born 1947), politician
- Max Guazzini (born 1947), entrepreneur
- Daniel Russo (born 1948), film actor
- Henri Proglio (born 1949), manager

=== 1950s ===
- Corinne Cléry (born 1950), actress
- Richard Galliano (born 1950), accordionist
- Gérard Schivardi (born 1950), politician
- Claude Bartolone (born 1951), politician
- Fabrice Luchini (born 1951), stage and film actor
- Marc Cerrone (born 1952), musician, composer and producer
- Jean-Marc Todeschini (born 1952), politician
- Francis Cabrel (born 1953), singer
- Patrick de Carolis (born 1953), TV presenter
- Angelo Parisi (born 1953), judoka
- Philippe Risoli (born 1953), television and radio presenter
- Christian Estrosi (born 1955), politician
- Michel Platini (born 1955), footballer
- Thierry Beccaro (born 1956), actor and TV presenter
- André Vallini (born 1956), politician
- Michèle Rubirola (1956), politician
- Claude Onesta (born 1957), handball player
- Thierry Gilardi (1958–2008), stage actor and television presenter
- Jeannie Longo (born 1958), cyclist
- Thierry Mariani (born 1958), politician

=== 1960s ===
- Gérard Onesta (born 1960), politician
- Catherine Malandrino (born 1963), fashion designer
- Stéphane Sanseverino (born 1961), singer
- Bruno Bellone (born 1962), footballer
- Michel Petrucciani (1962–1999), jazz pianist
- Roberto Alagna (born 1963), tenor singer
- Nadine Morano (born 1963), politician
- Jean Alesi (born 1964), Formula One driver
- Valeria Bruni-Tedeschi (born 1964), actress
- Christophe Neff (1964), geographer
- Eric Ciotti (born 1965), politician
- Jean-Marc Morandini (born 1965), journalist, radio, and TV host (Corsican father and Sardinian mother)
- Florent Emilio Siri (born 1965), film director and screenwriter
- Eric Cantona (born 1966), footballer
- Carla Bruni-Sarkozy (born 1967), actress
- David Ginola (born 1967), footballer
- Bruno Putzulu (born 1967), actor
- Jean-Michel Tinivelli (born 1967), actor
- Bruno Caliciuri (born 1968), singer-songwriter
- Tatiana Trouvé (born 1968), contemporary visual artist
- Laurence Ferrari (born 1969), journalist and TV anchor
- Marianne James, singer, writer, actress

=== 1970s ===
- Benjamin Castaldi (born 1970), television personality
- Marina Foïs (born 1970), actress
- Dominique Casagrande (born 1971), footballer
- Damien Comolli (born 1971), football executive
- Hélène Ségara (née Hélène Rizzo) (born 1971), singer
- Sylvie Testud (born 1971), actress, writer and film director
- Philippe Candeloro (born 1972), figure skater
- Julie Gayet (born 1972), actress and film producer
- Chiara Mastroianni (born 1972), actress and singer
- Vincent Candela (born 1973), footballer
- Aurélie Filippetti (born 1973), novelist and politician
- Florence Foresti (born 1973), comedian and actress
- Elsa Lunghini (born 1973), singer and actress
- Alessandro Mercuri (born 1973), author and director
- Laurent Sciarra (born 1973), basketball player
- Barbara Pompili (born 1975), politician
- Gilles Marini (born 1976), actor
- Alice Taglioni (born 1976), actress and model
- Fanny Biascamano (born 1979), singer

=== 1980s ===
- Seth Gueko (Nicolas Salvadori) (born 1980), rapper
- Benoît Pedretti (born 1980), footballer
- Julie de Bona (born 1980), actress
- Roxane Mesquida (born 1981), actress and model
- Franck Signorino (born 1981), footballer
- Laëtitia Tonazzi (born 1981), footballer
- Jenifer (born 1982), singer and actress
- Vitaa (Charlotte Gonin) (born 1983), singer
- Mathieu Flamini (born 1984), footballer
- Pio Marmaï, (born 1984) actor
- Morgan Amalfitano (born 1985), footballer
- Élise Bussaglia (born 1985), footballer
- Anthony Scaramozzino (born 1985), singer
- Irene Curtoni (born 1985), ski racer
- Soko (singer) (born 1985), singer
- Charlotte Casiraghi (born 1986), princess of Monaco
- Olivier Giroud (born 1986), footballer
- Frédéric Sammaritano (born 1986), footballer
- Vincent Muratori (born 1987), footballer
- Elisa Sednaoui (born 1987), model, actress, philanthropist and film director
- Yoann Maestri (born 1988), rugby union player
- Romain Alessandrini (born 1989), footballer
- Romain Amalfitano (born 1989), footballer
- Jules Bianchi (1989–2015), Formula One driver
- Priscilla Betti (born 1989), singer, dancer and actress
- Vincent Laurini (born 1989), footballer
- Benjamin Toniutti (born 1989), volleyball player
- Guillaume Gigliotti (born 1989), footballer

=== 1990s ===
- Rémy Cabella (born 1990), footballer
- Xavier Chiocci (born 1990), rugby player
- Sébastien Corchia (born 1990), footballer
- Alexy Bosetti (born 1993), footballer
- Cindy Bruna (born 1994), model
- Yoan Cardinale (born 1994), footballer
- Paul Nardi (born 1994), footballer
- Jordan Bardella (born 1995), French politician
- Enzo Crivelli (born 1995), footballer
- Sandie Toletti (born 1995), footballer
- Caroline Costa (born 1996), singer
- Fiona Ferro (born 1997), tennis player
- Delphine Cascarino (born 1997), footballer
- Estelle Cascarino (born 1997), footballer
- Paul Bernardoni (born 1997), footballer
- Olivier Boscagli (born 1997), footballer
- Lorenzo Callegari (born 1998), footballer
- Hugo Magnetti (born 1998), footballer
- Julie Piga (born 1998), footballer
- Sonia Ben Ammar (born 1999), model and singer
- Nicolas Cozza (born 1999), footballer
- Fabio Quartararo (born 1999), Grand Prix Motorcycle racer

=== 2000s ===
- Alessandro Ghiretti (born 2002), racing driver
- Angelina (born 2009), singer

== Gallery ==
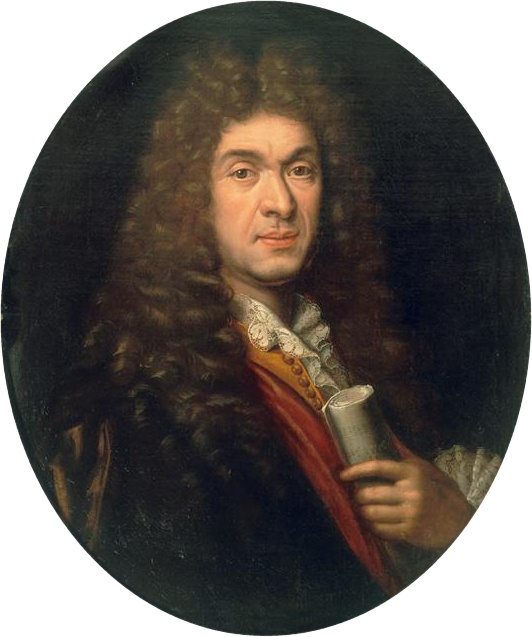
Jean-Baptiste Lully

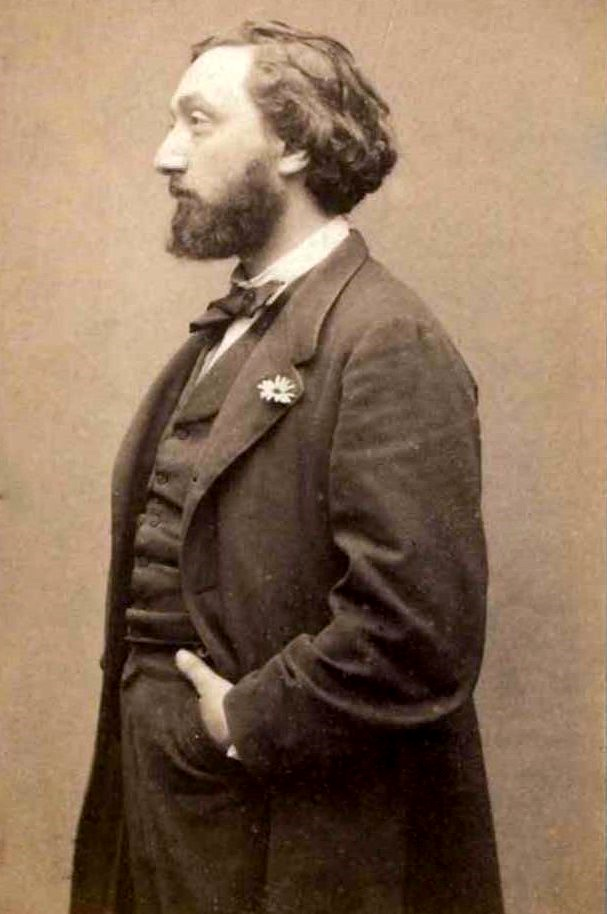
Léon Gambetta

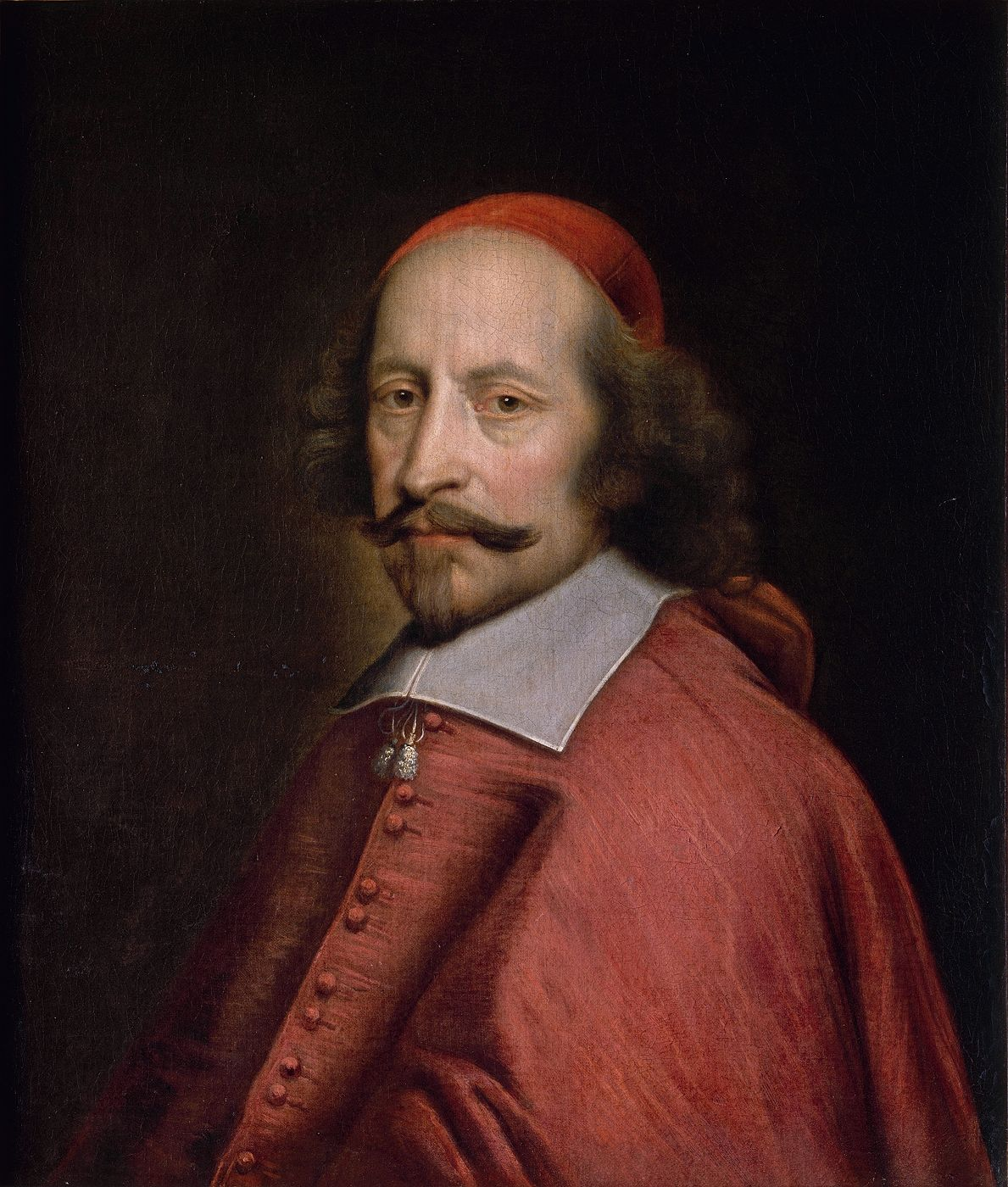
Jules Mazarin

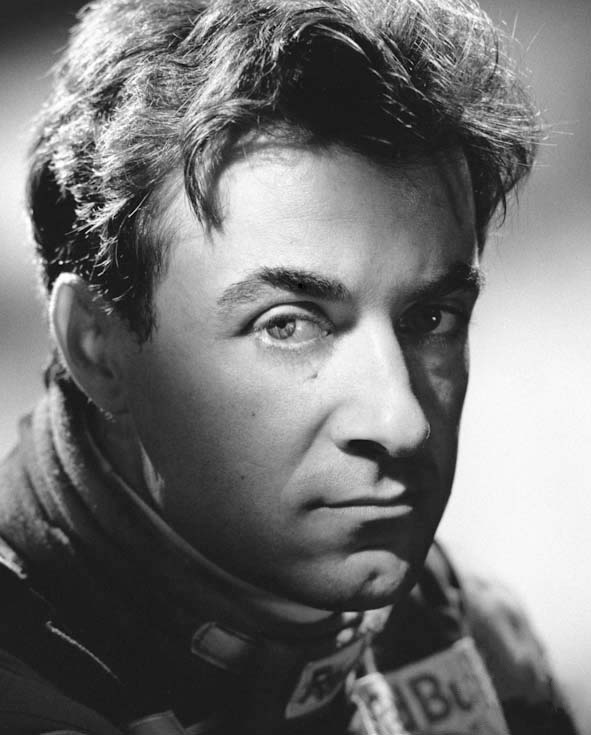
Jean Alesi

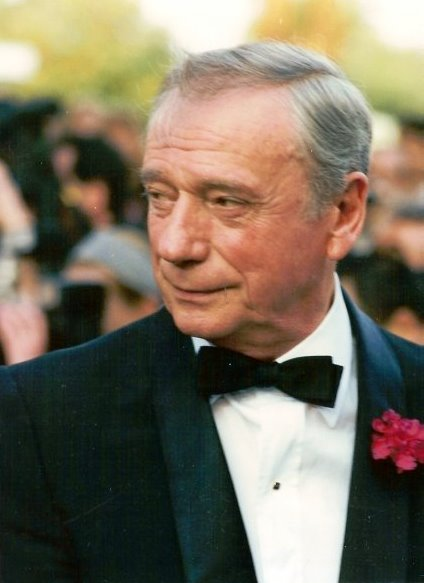
Yves Montand

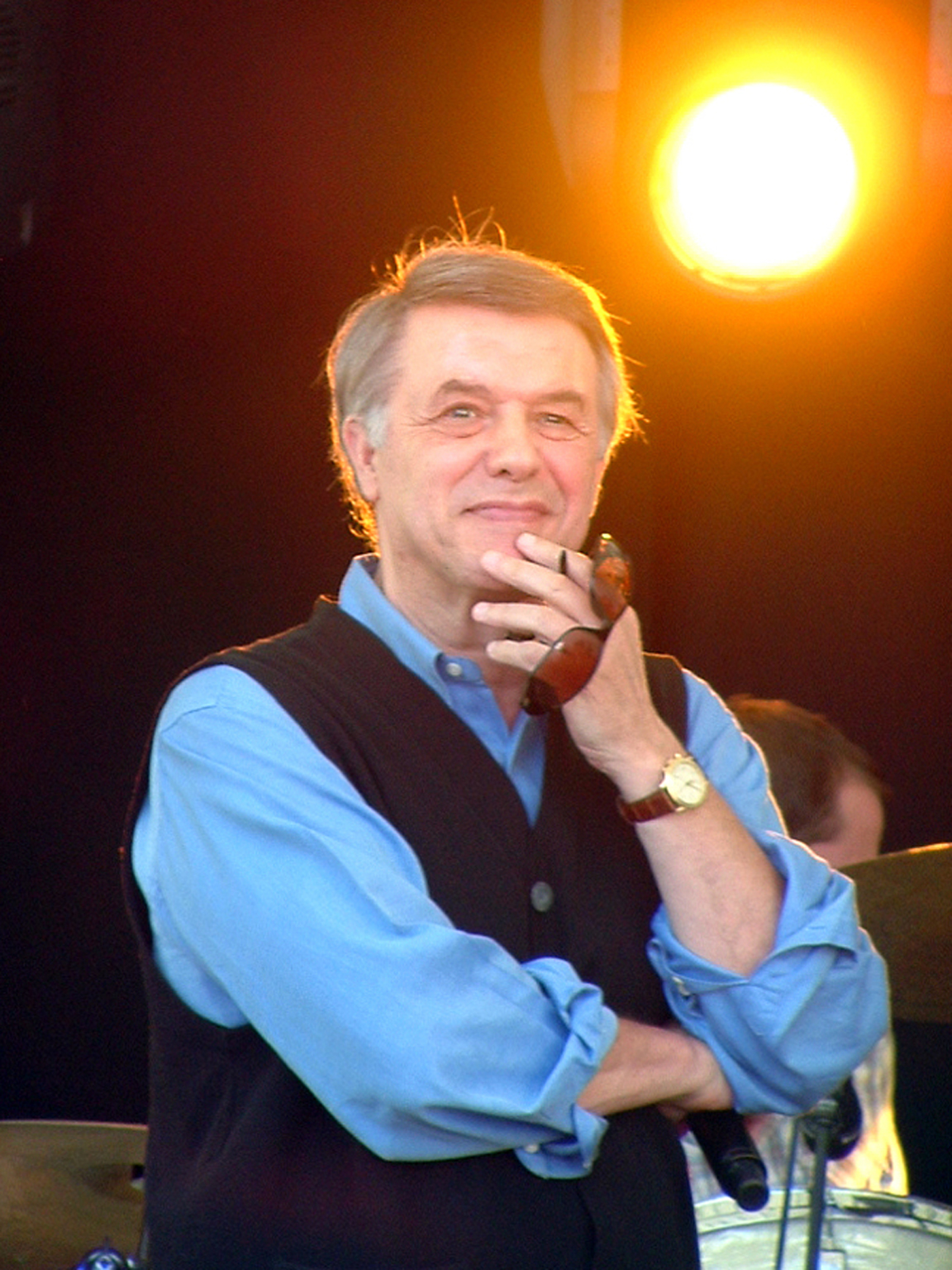
Salvatore Adamo

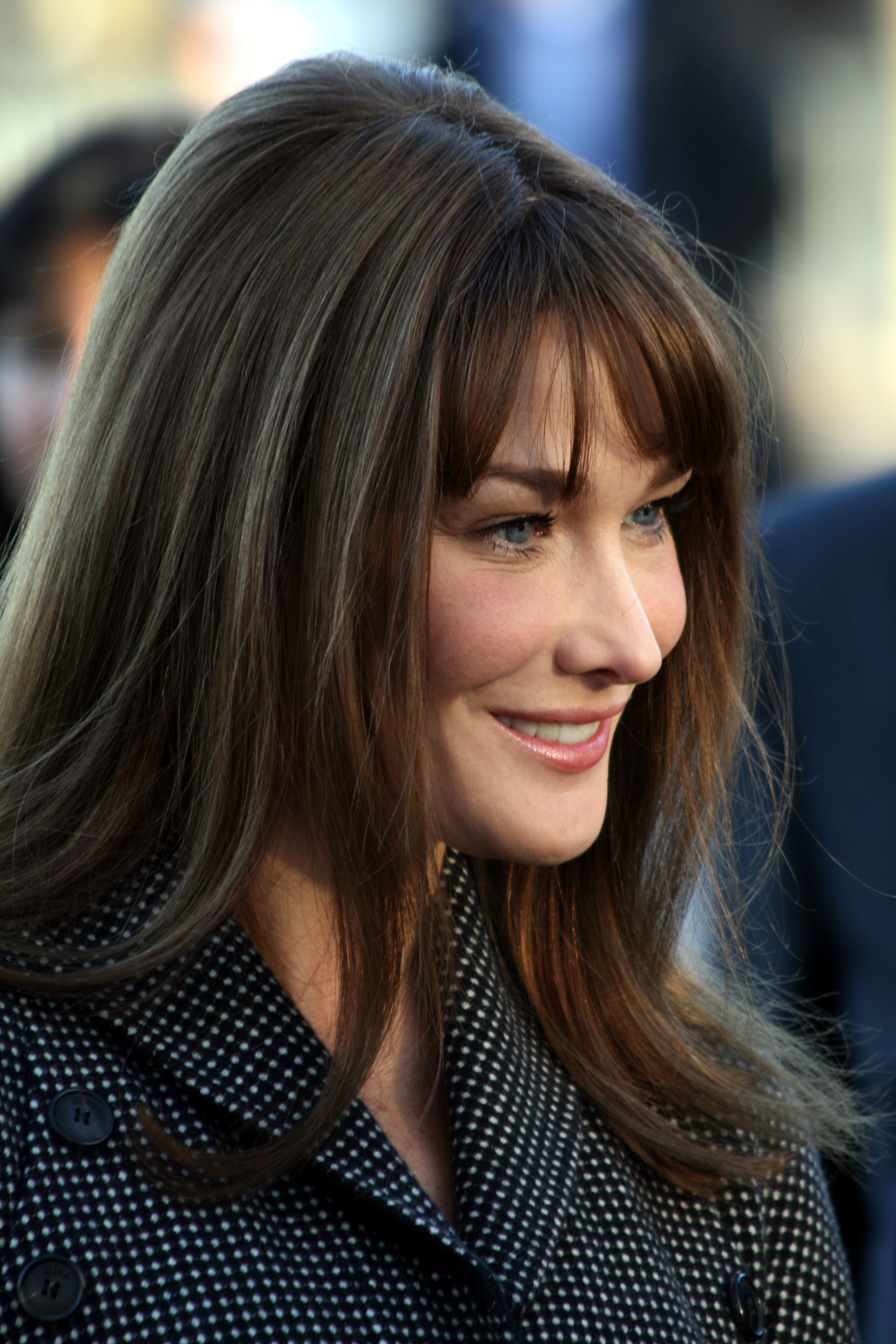
Carla Bruni

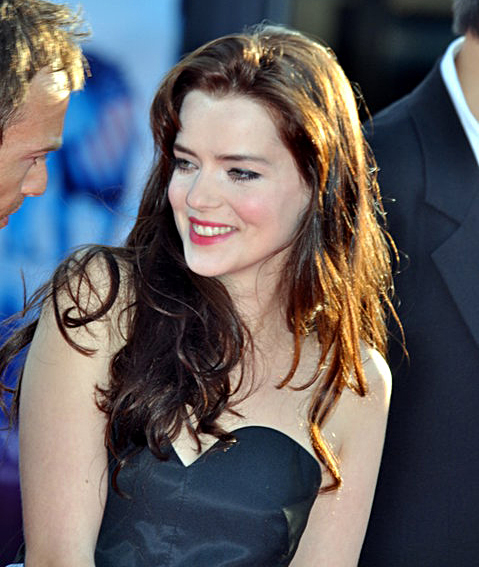
Roxane Mesquida

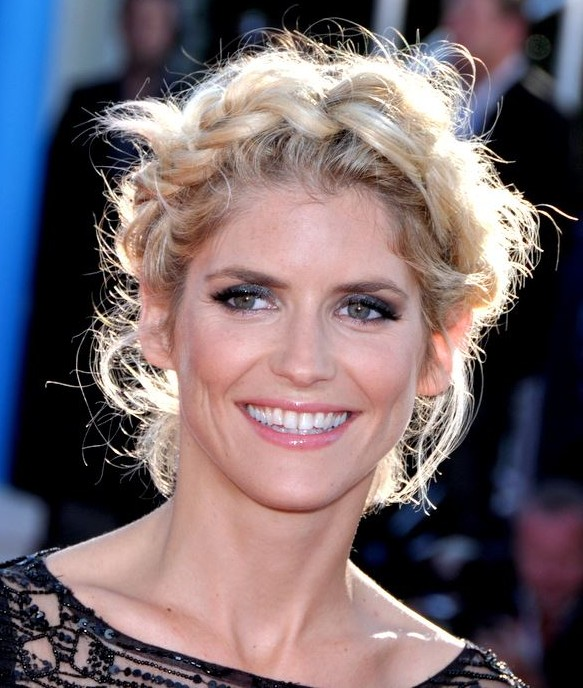
Alice Taglioni

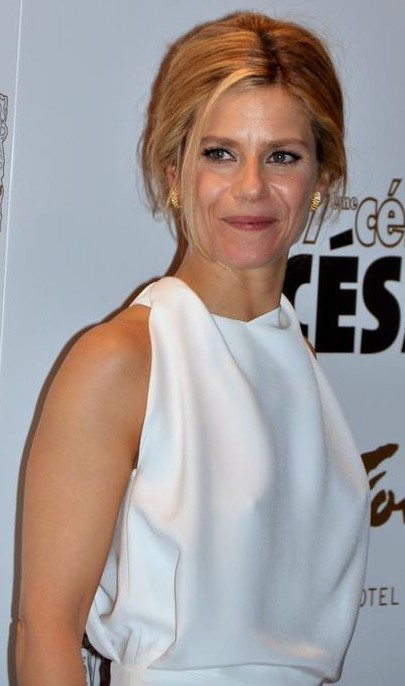
Marina Foïs

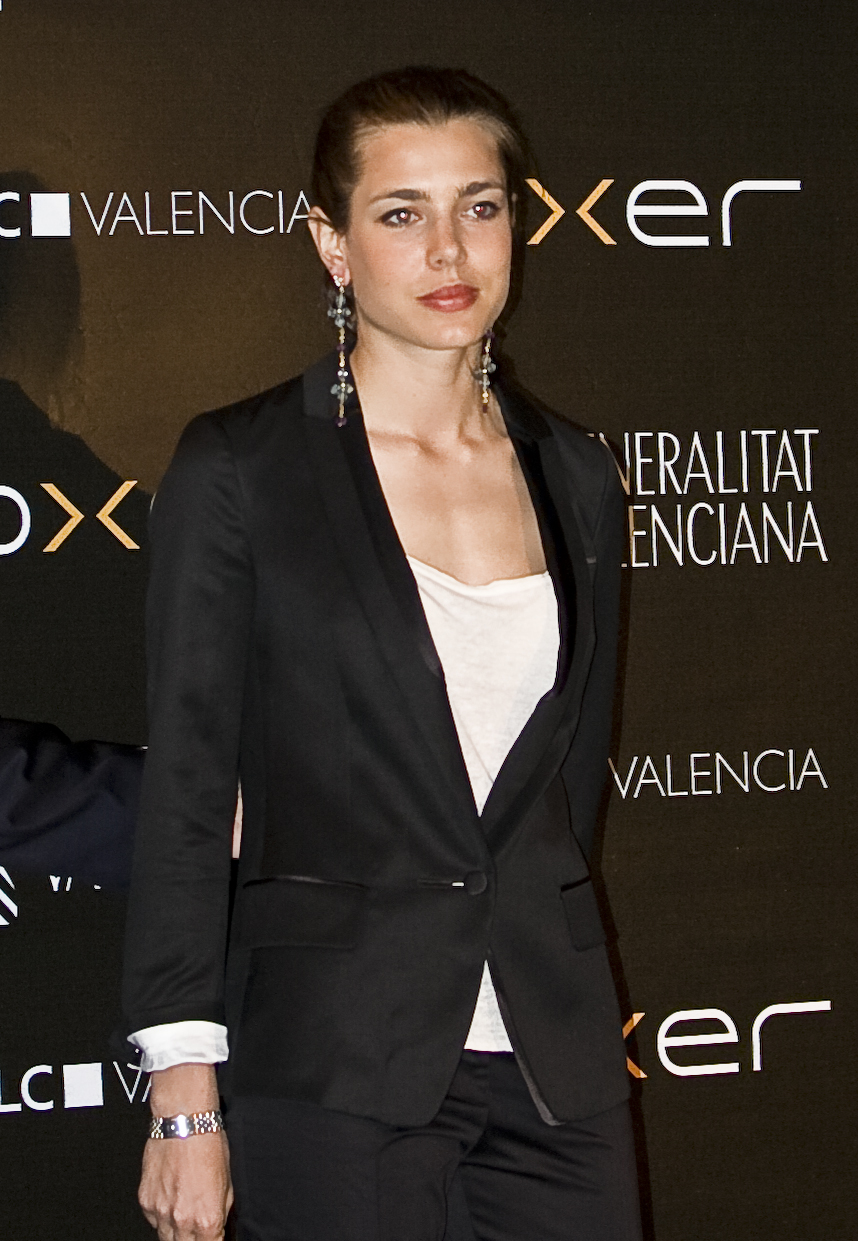
Charlotte Casiraghi

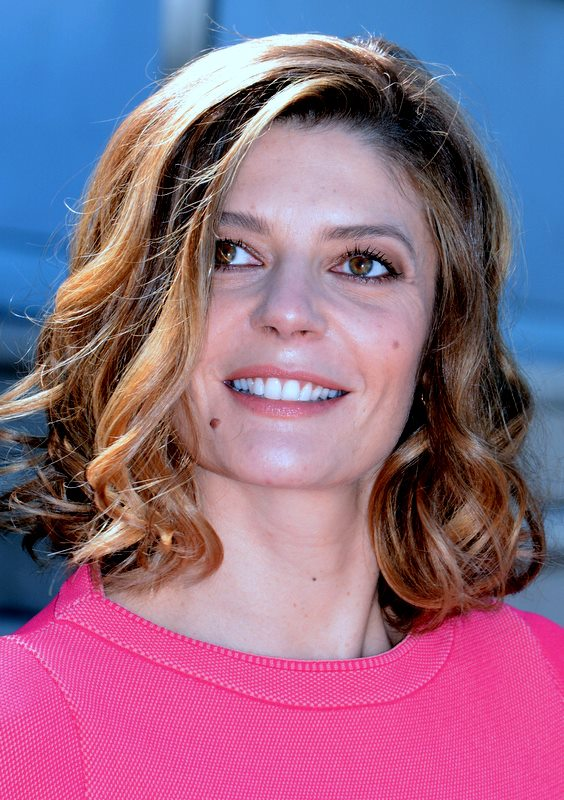
Chiara Mastroianni

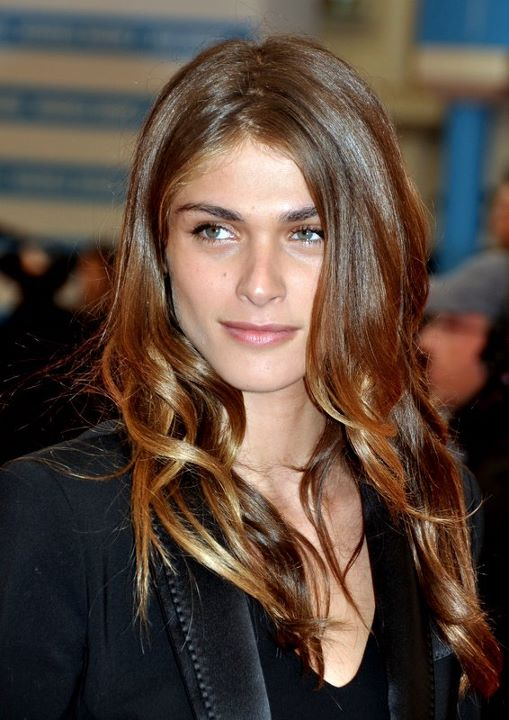
Elisa Sednaoui

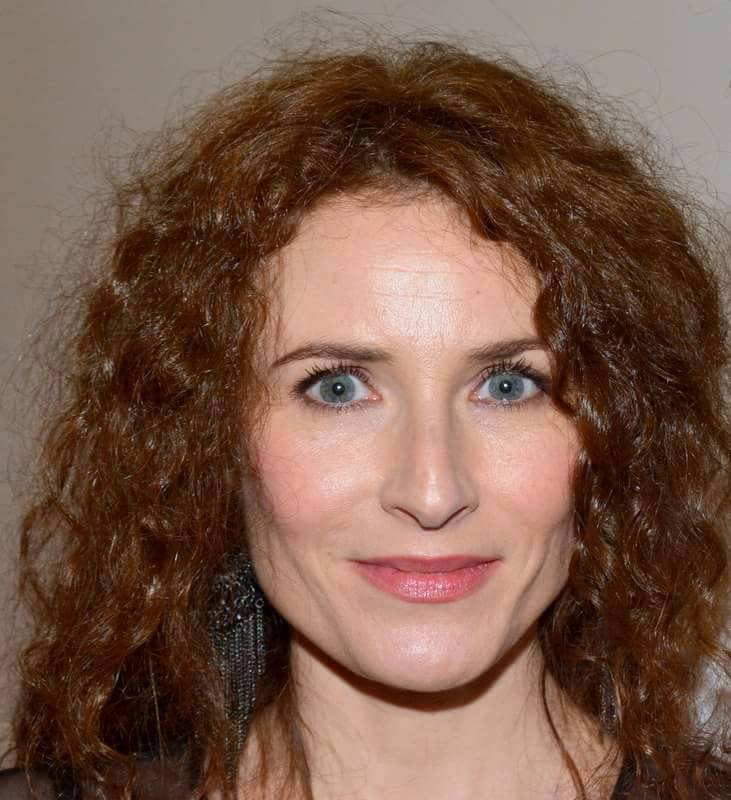
Elsa Lunghini

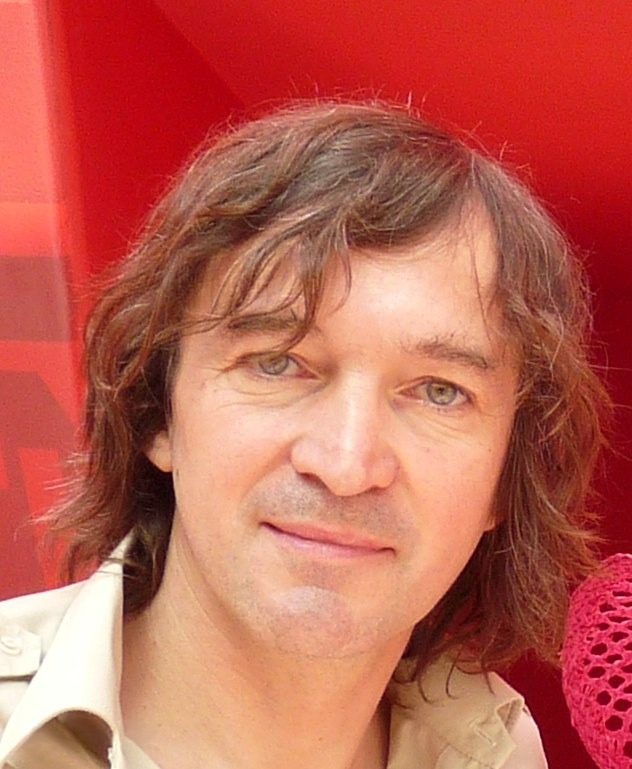
Cali

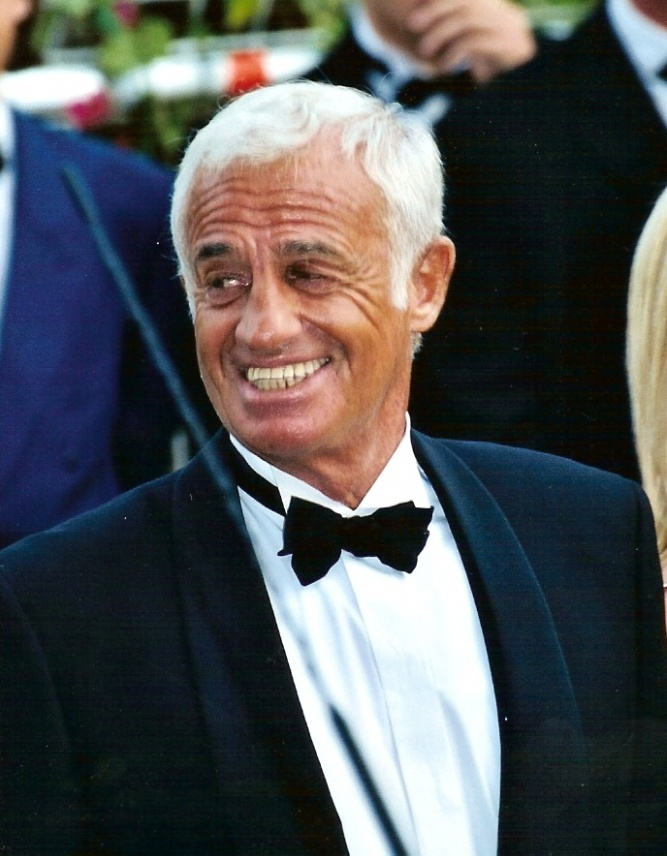
Jean-Paul Belmondo

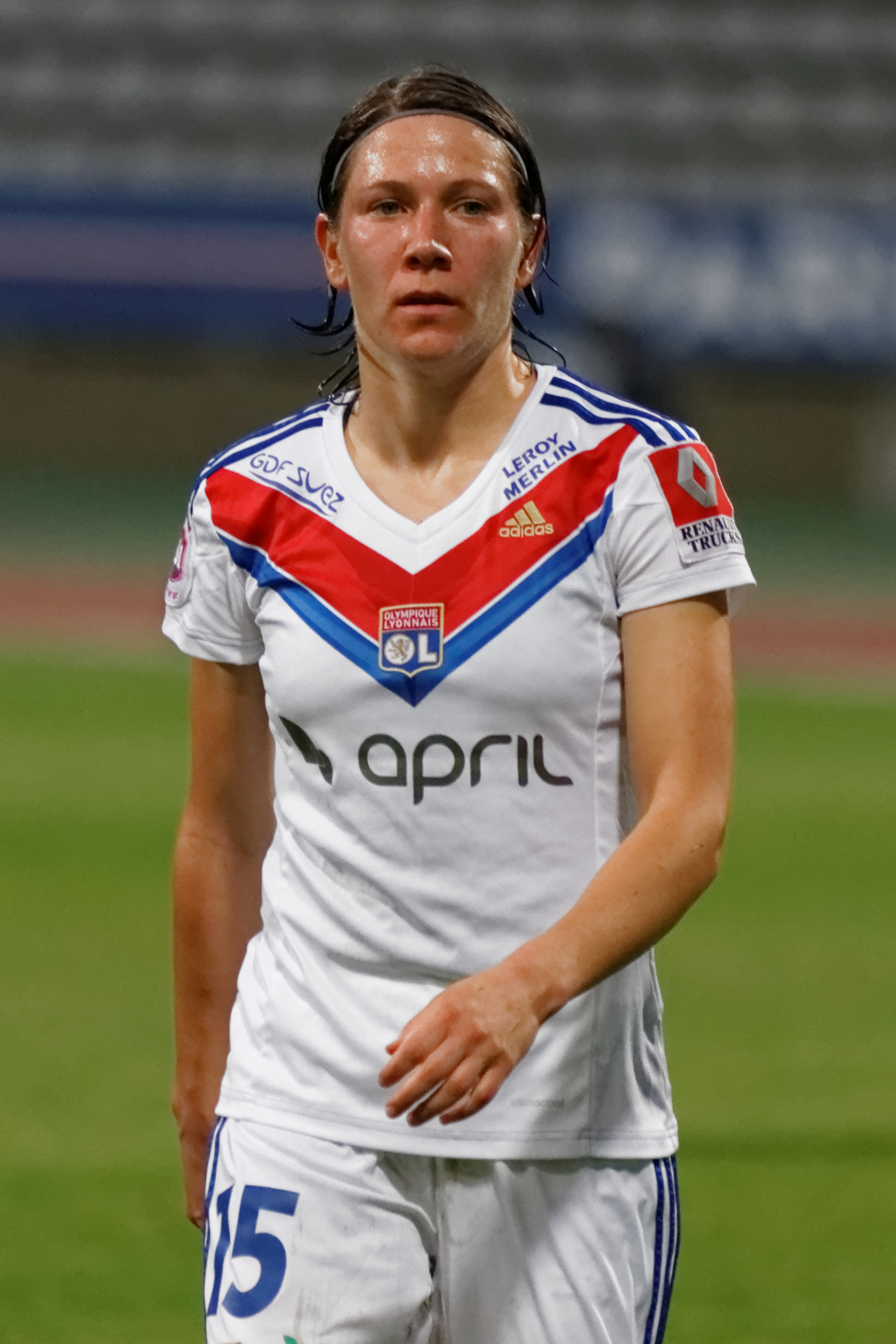
Élise Bussaglia

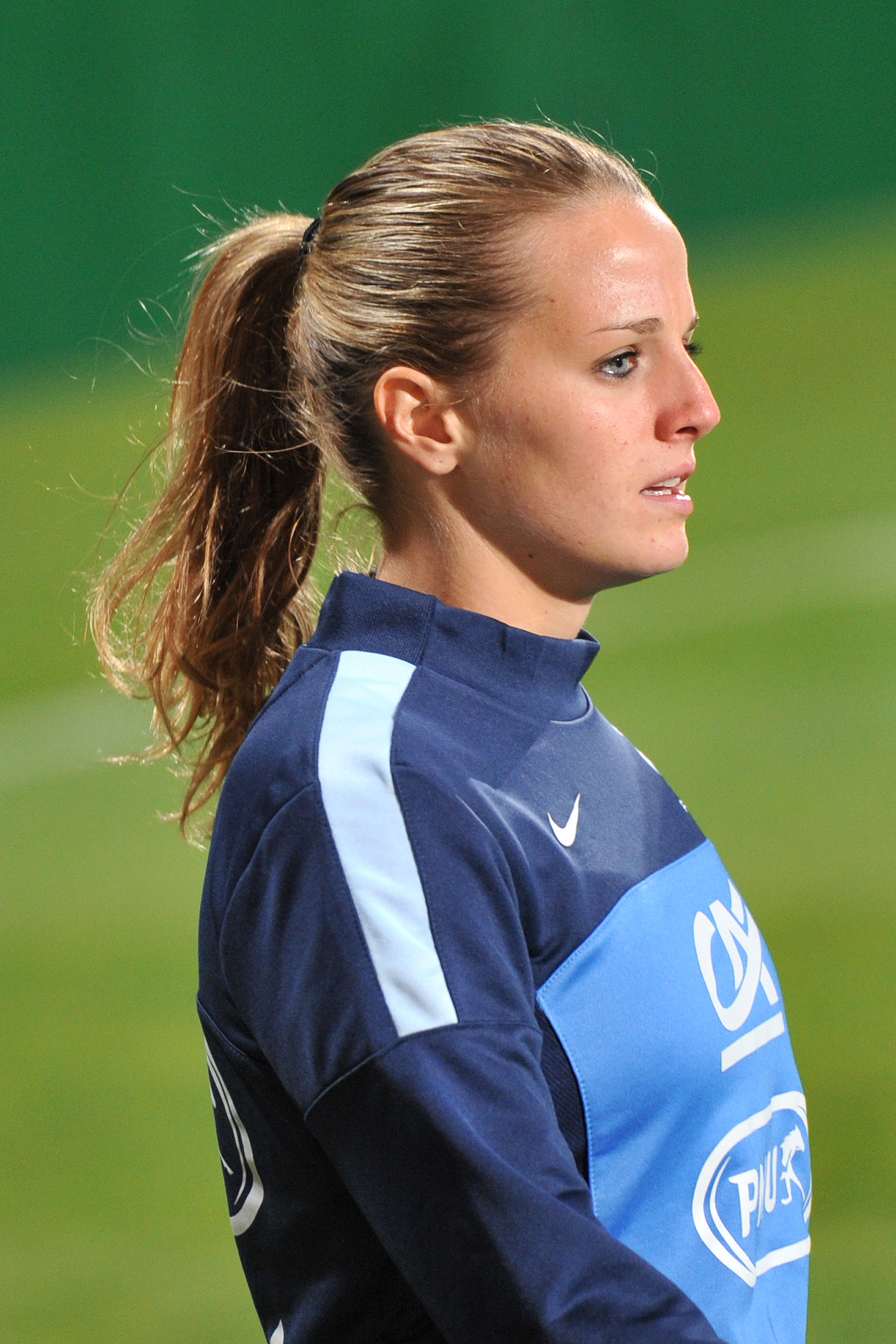
Sandie Toletti

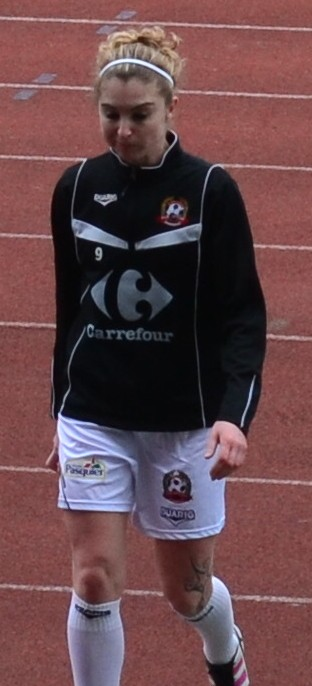
Laëtitia Tonazzi

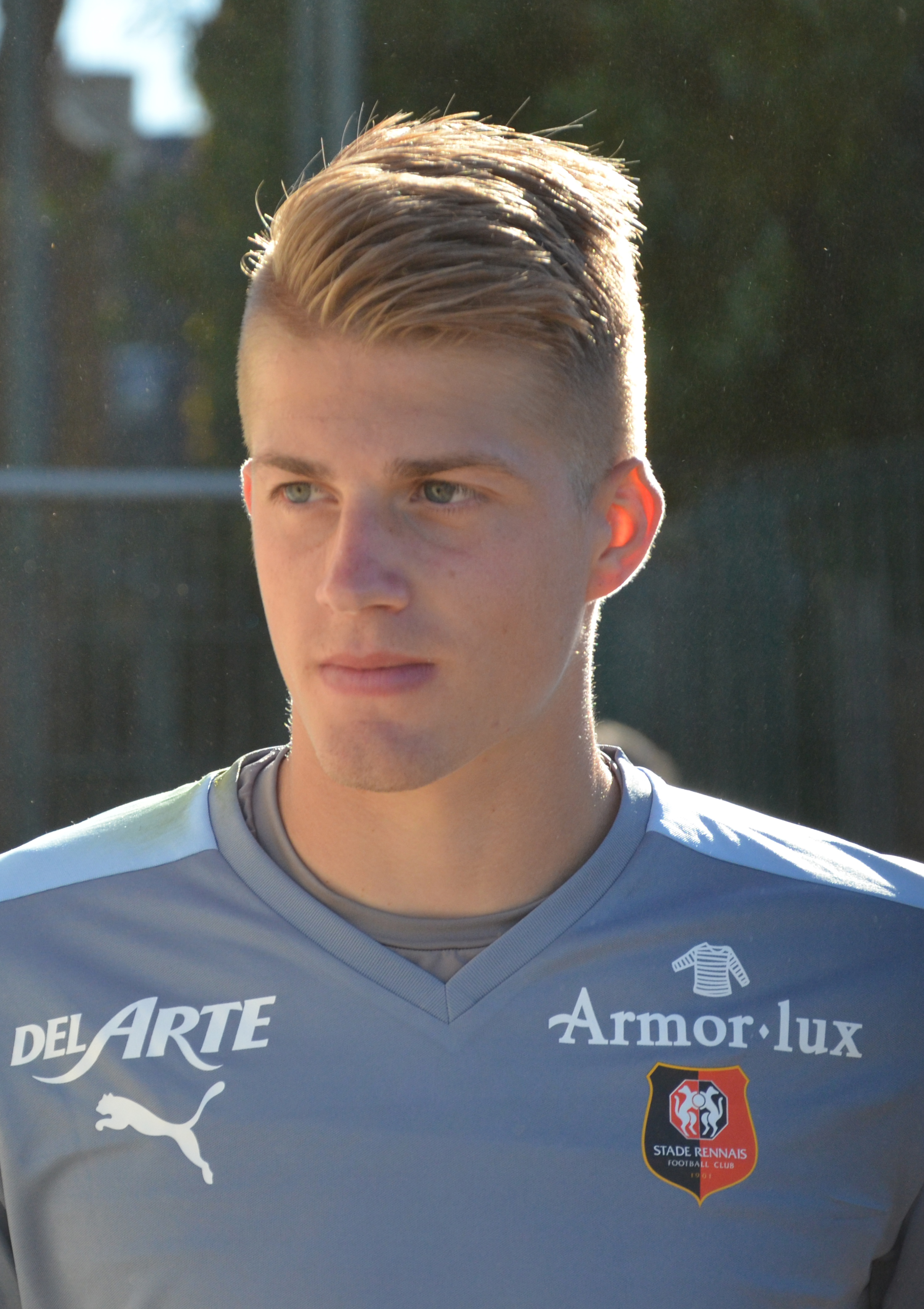
Paul Nardi

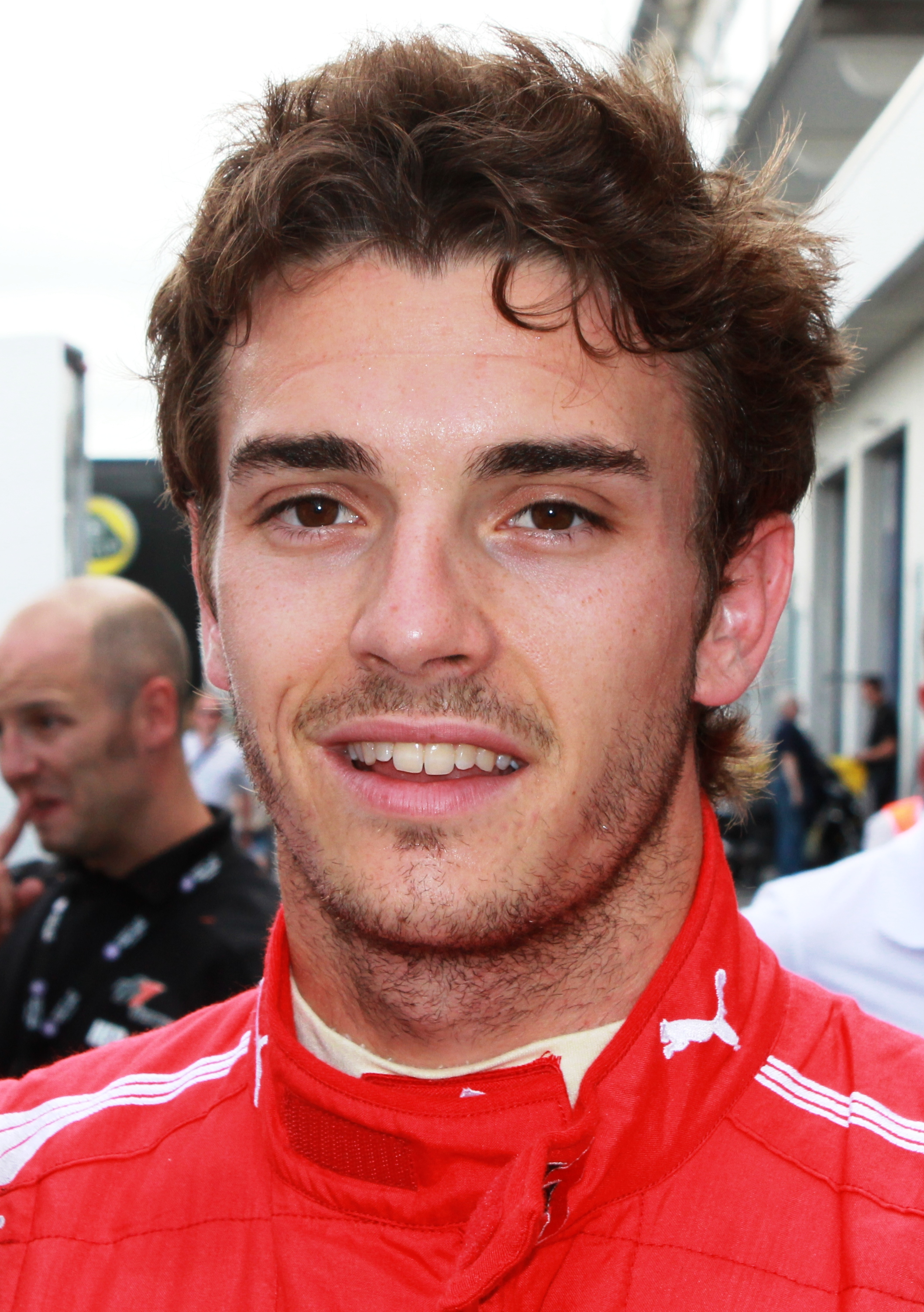
Jules Bianchi

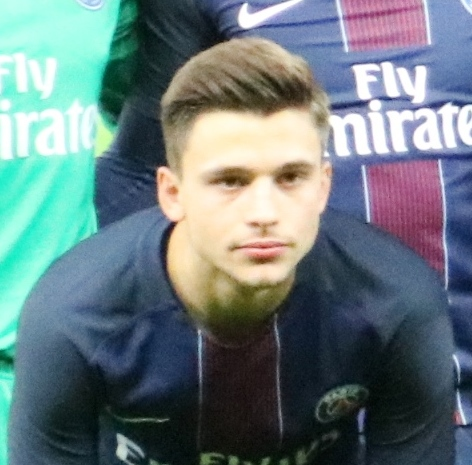
Lorenzo Callegari

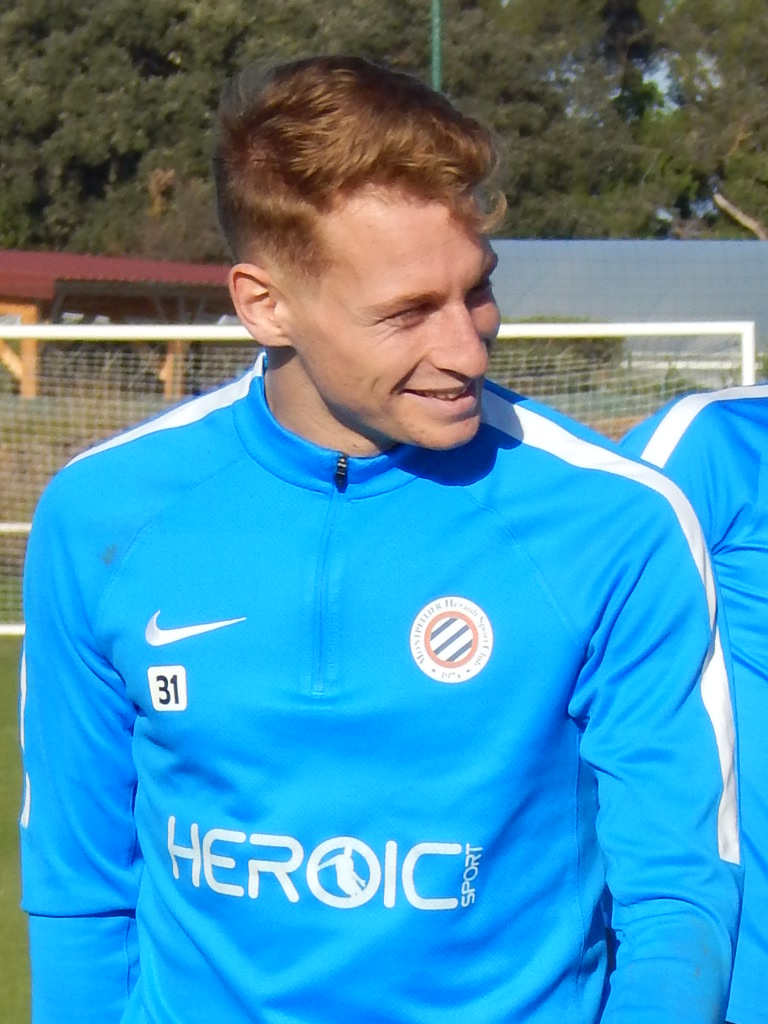
Nicolas Cozza

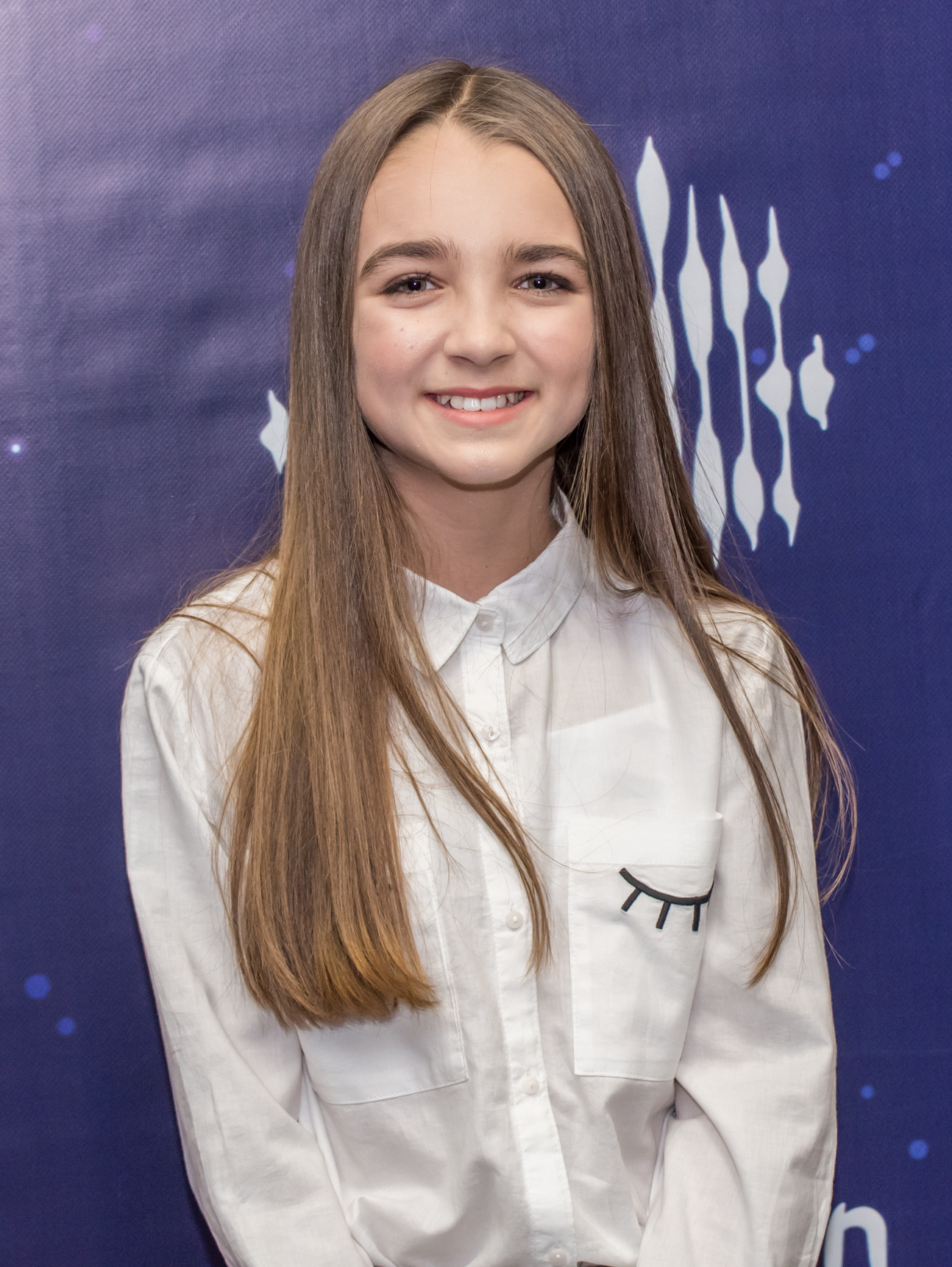
Angelina

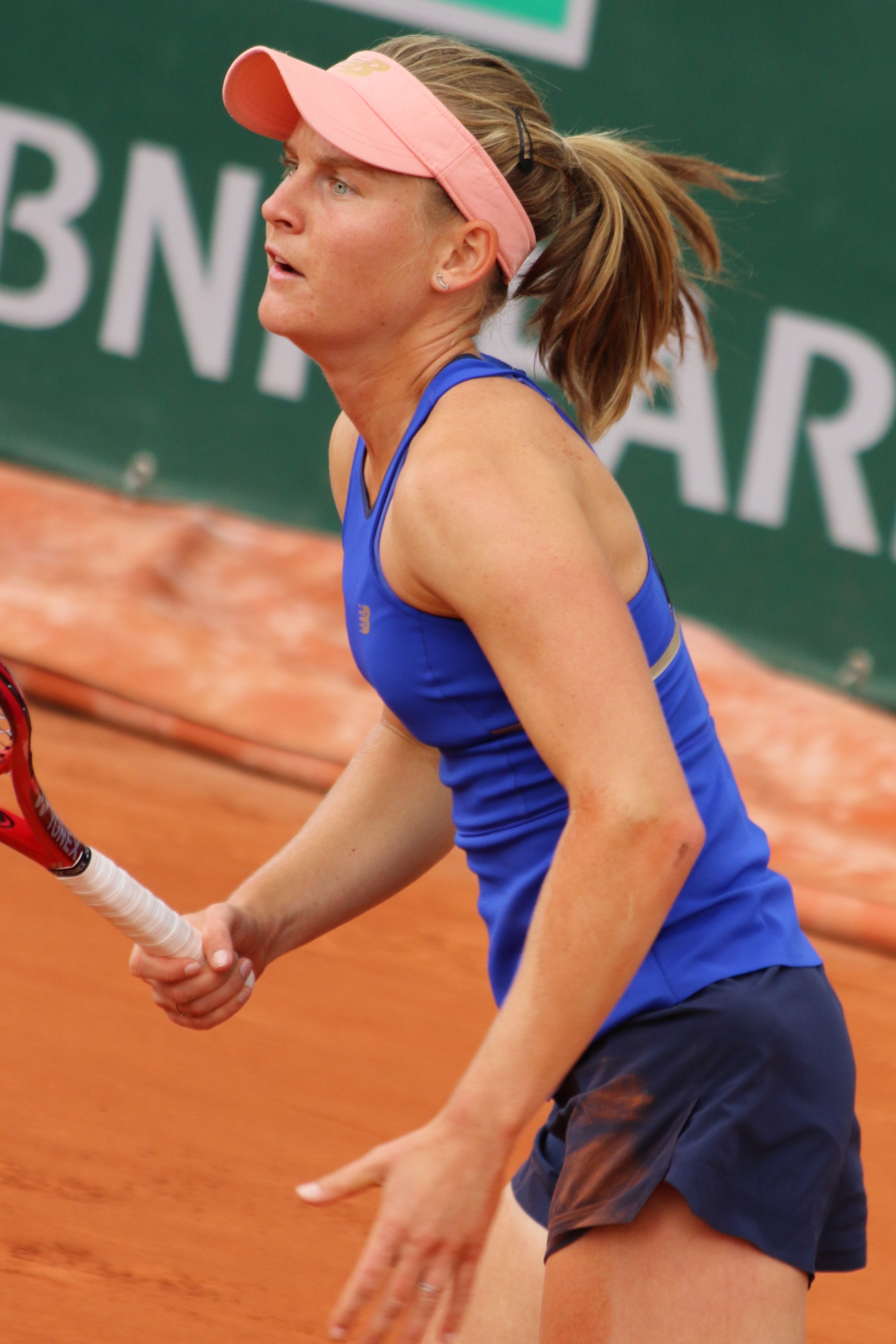
Fiona Ferro

== See also ==
- Italian diaspora
- Corsicans
- France–Italy relations
