= Jean-Michel Tinivelli =

French actor

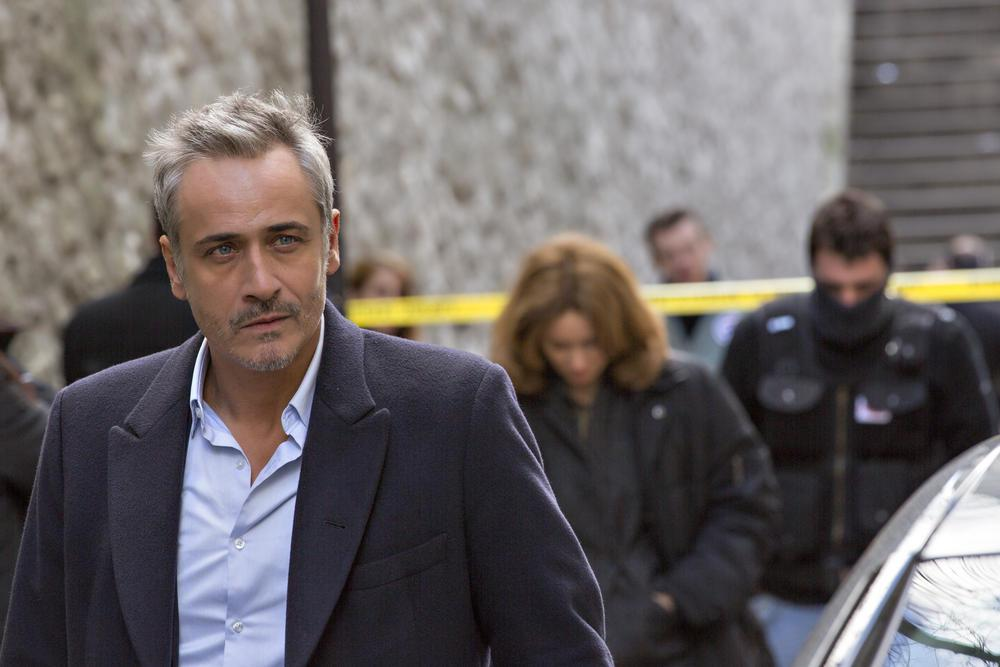
- Jean Michel in an episode Alice Nevers
- Born: March 19, 1967 (age 58); Strasbourg, Bas-Rhin, France
- Occupation: Actor
- Years active: 1992–present

Jean-Michel Tinivelli (born March 19, 1967) is a French actor with Italian roots.
