= Massacre of Italians at Aigues-Mortes =

Massacre in France in August 1893

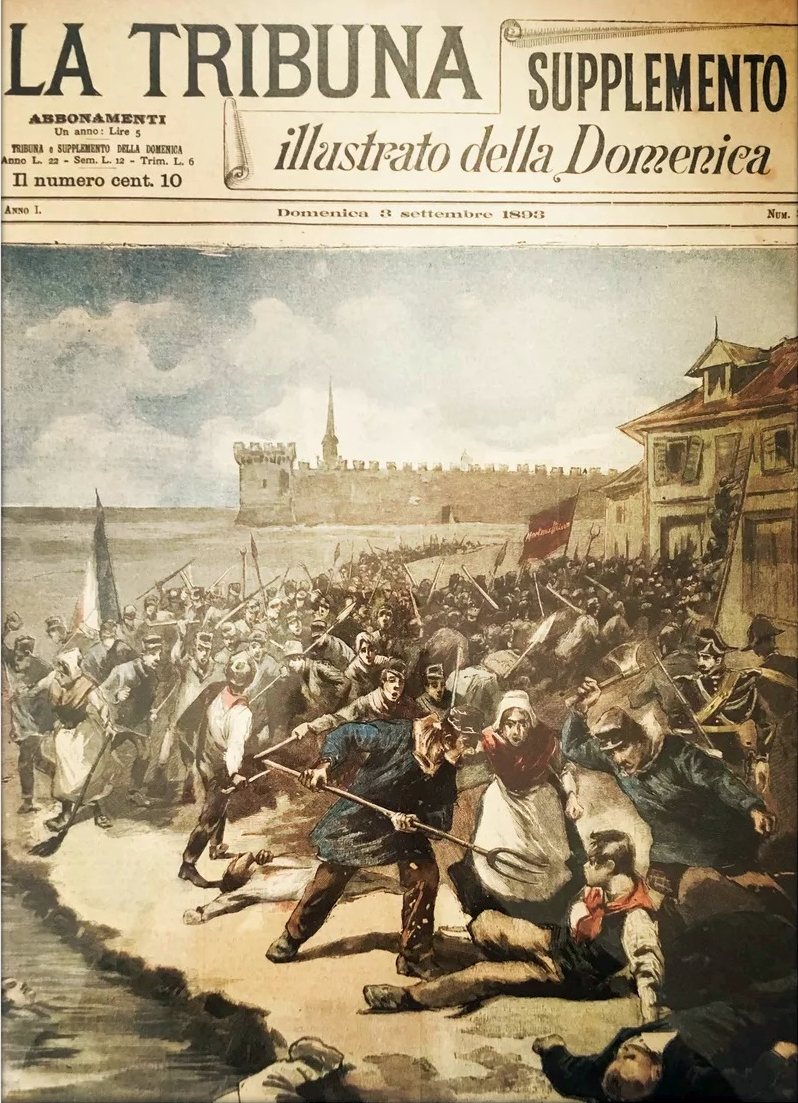
- Massacre of the Italian salt workers at Aigues-Mortes
- Location: Aigues-Mortes in the Camargue (France)
- Date: 16–17 August 1893
- Target: Italian migrant workers at the salt pits
- Attack type: Massacre
- Deaths: Unclear, numbers vary from 9 to 150. Most probably 17 dead and 150 injured.
- Perpetrators: Angry mob of the local population and unemployed French workers detesting poor Italian immigrant labourers who were prepared to work at cut-rate wages
- Motive: A brawl between the local and immigrant Italian communities rapidly escalating into a battle of honour

The Massacre of the Italians at Aigues-Mortes was a series of events on 16 and 17 August 1893, in Aigues-Mortes, France, which resulted in the deaths of immigrant Italian workers of the Compagnie des Salins du Midi, at the hands of French villagers and labourers. Estimates range from the official number of eight deaths up to 150, according to the Italian press of the time. Those killed were victims of lynchings, beatings with clubs, drowning and rifle shots. There were also many non-fatal injuries.

The massacre was not the first attack by French workers on poor Italian immigrant labourers who were prepared to work at cut-rate wages. When the news reached Italy, anti-French riots erupted in the country. The case was also one of the greatest legal scandals of the time, since no convictions were ever made.

== Description of the events ==
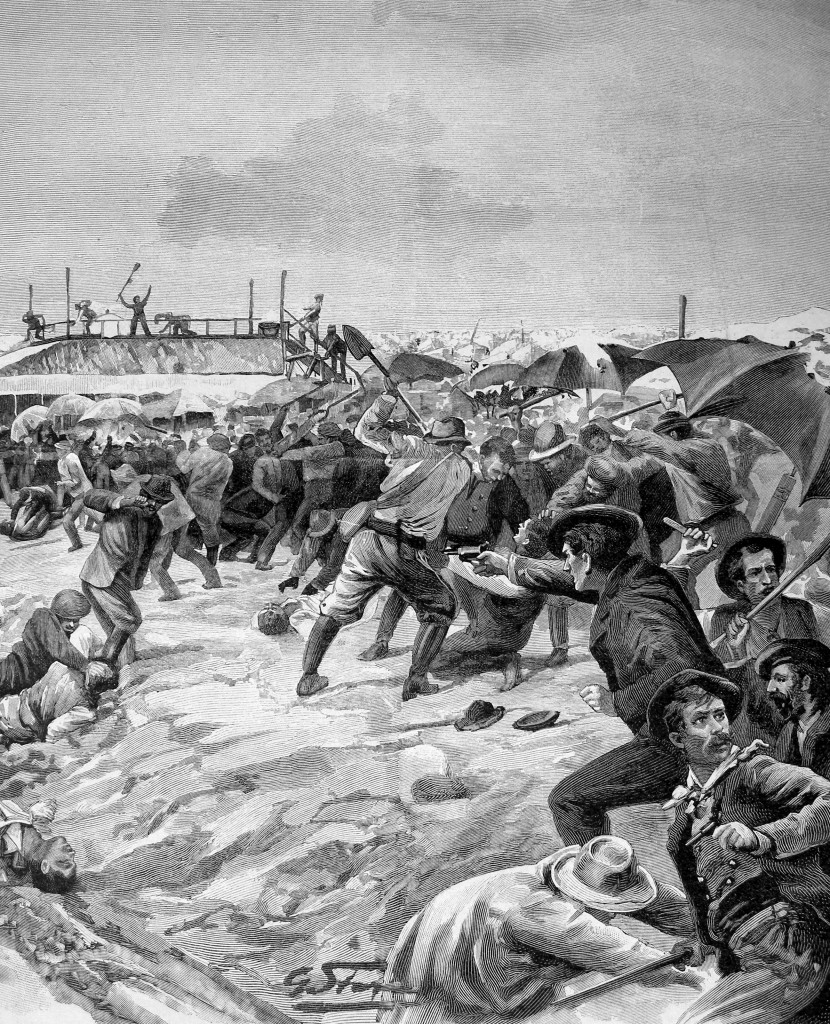
Attack on Italian workers by the salt workers of Aigues-Mortes (G. Stern, 1893)

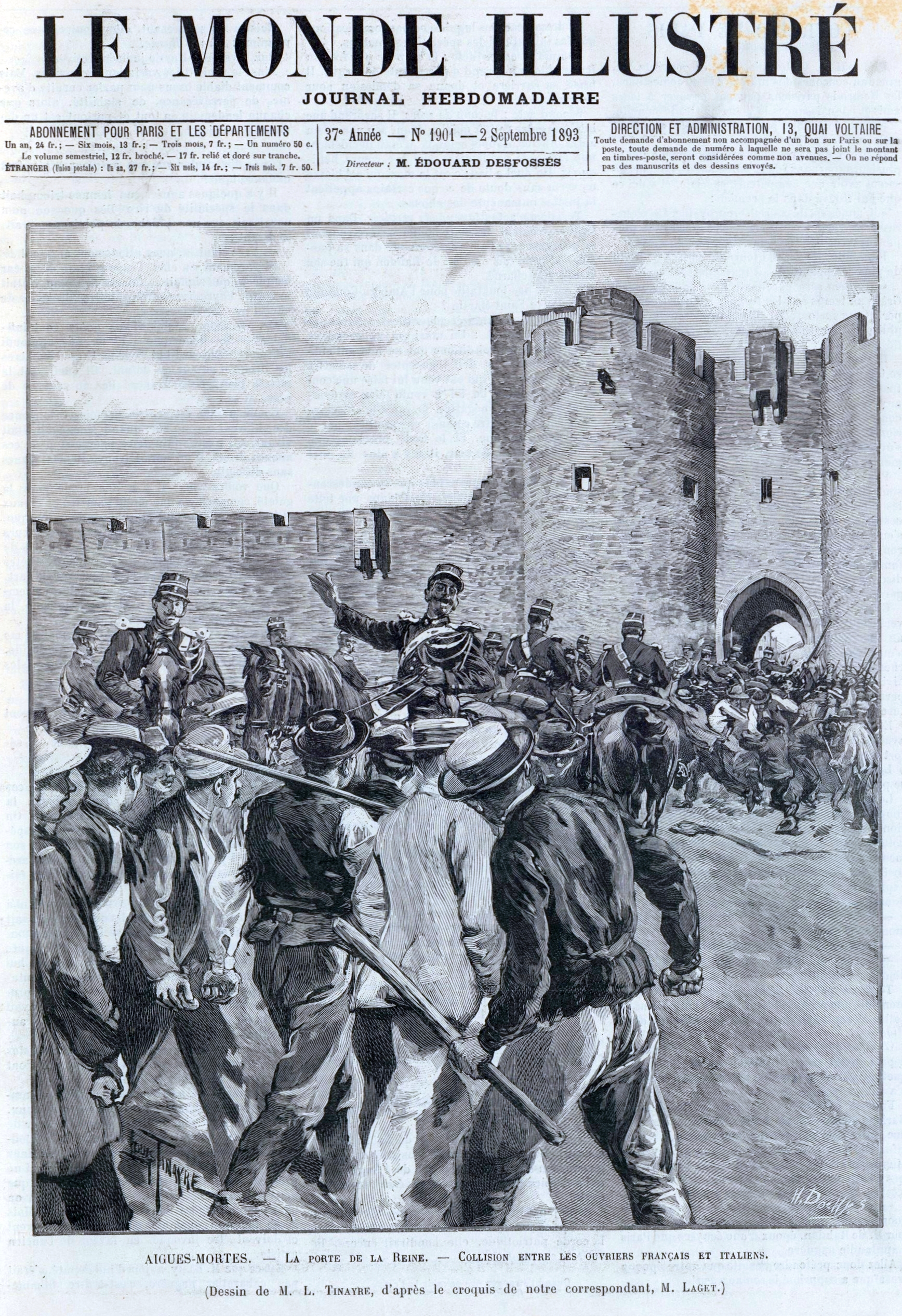
Arrival of troops on the scene, 18 hours after the drama

In the summer of 1893, the Compagnie des Salins du Midi began to recruit workers to harvest seasalt from its evaporation ponds (salines). With unemployment increasing because of an economic crisis in Europe, the prospect of finding seasonal employment attracted more applicants than usual. They were divided into three categories: Ardéchois (peasants, not necessarily from Ardèche, who left their land seasonally); Piémontais (Italians originating from across northern Italy and recruited on the spot by team leaders); and trimards (composed partly of vagrants).

Because of the recruitment policies of the Compagnie des Salins du Midi, the team leaders were constrained to form teams comprising French and Italians. On the morning of 16 August, a brawl between the two communities rapidly escalated into a battle of honour.

Despite the intervention of a justice of the peace and gendarmes, the situation rapidly deteriorated. Some trimards reached Aigues-Mortes and said that the Italians had killed some local Aiguemortais, causing their ranks to grow from the local population and workers who had been unable to secure employment. A group of Italians was then attacked and had to take refuge in a bakery that the rioters wanted to set fire to. The prefect called in troops at around 4 o'clock in the morning; they did not arrive on the scene until 6 pm, after the drama.

In the morning, the situation festered. The rioters went into the Peccais salines (43.539714°N 4.218535°E), where there was the largest number of Italians. Gendarme captain Cabley was trying to protect them, while promising the rioters he would drive out the Italians once they had been escorted back to the railway station in Aigues-Mortes. It was during the journey that the Italians were attacked by the rioters and massacred by a crowd that the gendarmes were unable to contain.

According to the French authorities, there were officially eight deaths. The identities of all of them are known: Carlo Tasso from Alessandria, Vittorio Caffaro from Pinerolo, Bartolomeo Calori from Turin, Giuseppe Merlo from Centallo, Lorenzo Rolando from Altare, Paolo Zanetti from Nese, Amaddio Caponi from San Miniato and Giovanni Bonetto. The body of a ninth Italian, Secondo Torchio, was never recovered. Following the events, 17 Italians were too seriously injured to be evacuated by train — one of them died of tetanus a month later.

== Consequences ==
When the news of the massacre reached Italy, anti-French riots erupted in many cities. The testimonies of the injured Italians as well as inaccurate news agency dispatches (there was a talk of hundreds of deaths, children impaled and carried around victoriously, etc.) contributed to a growing wave of indignation. In Genoa and Naples trams owned by a French company were set on fire. In Rome the windows of the French embassy were smashed, and for a while the angry mob seemed to get out of hand.

The affair became a diplomatic challenge as the foreign press took note and sided with the Italians. A diplomatic solution was found and the parties were compensated: the Italian workers on the one hand, and France for the riots at the Palazzo Farnese, the French embassy in Rome. The mayor of Aigues-Mortes, Marius Terras, had to resign.

== Numbers ==
Exact numbers are unclear. Although the French authorities stated 8 officially, the number of deaths is known to be 9. The Paris daily Le Temps, in a dispatch dated 18 August, reported that there were a dozen bodies in the hospital, others must have drowned and yet more would die from their injuries.

The New York Times, reporting from the trial of ringleaders later in the year, reported that "ten men were killed and twenty-six wounded", though it had reported earlier "anywhere from twenty to sixty dead Italians" and that the Italians "had been killed off by the dozen" and that "forty-five dead bodies of Italians have been collected" while others were missing and supposed to lie dead in the marshes".

In London, The Graphic, a week after the events, reported that "twenty-eight Italians were wounded and eventually six Italians and one Frenchman succumbed to their injuries." The Penny Illustrated Paper claimed that "several Frenchmen were wounded, and two mortally. Close upon twenty Italians were killed, and many more wounded", though no evidence was later provided of French deaths. Other sources claim the "deaths of 14 people and many injuries".

The Aigues-Mortes tourist office website, in a page on the massacre, says that the actual figures were 17 dead and 150 injured. Graham Robb in The Discovery of France gives a number of 50, presumably from the figure used contemporaneously by The Times in London. According to some sources, it was much higher. Giovanni Gozzini in Le migrazioni di ieri e di oggi suggests a figure as high as 400 injured.

== The trial ==
Immediately after the events, the public prosecutor in Nîmes got to work to trace witnesses. He investigated 70, including 17 Italians, and opened 41 files leading to indictments against 17 accused, eight of whom had previous criminal records. Charges were laid on 10 September and, at the request of the prosecutor, the Cour de Cassation agreed to hold the trials in Angoulême. Among the defendants was an Italian worker, Giordano, defended by M. Guillibert, a lawyer from Aix. The trial was due to open on 11 December 1893 but due to the complexity of the case, it was not actually started until 27 December.

As the trial progressed, it became clear that convictions were unlikely. The New York Times reported that "Evidence in the trial is extremely perplexing and suggests wholesale perjury on both sides. What the result ought to be nobody has the slightest idea, but it is taken for granted that a French jury will not punish French citizens, and that Italy will be supplied with a large and valuable grievance."

One defendant, Barbier, who had previously admitted playing an active part in the events of 17 August, totally retracted his evidence and claimed he had never been there. Despite the efforts of the court, it was impossible to get from him anything other than abject denials. A French worker, Vernet, supposedly stabbed in the stomach and the side by an Italian, had not answered a witness summons. The prosecutor sent for him by telegraph. The following day, a 30-year-old Vernet was called to the stand and asked if he had been stabbed. He replied, "I wasn't stabbed. I didn't even go to the saltpans at Aigues-Mortes." Asked if he was, indeed, Vernet from Saint-Laurent-du-Pont, he replied "Certainly, but I'm a telegram postman in Grenoble and I have never set foot in the saltpans. I know another Vernet in Saint-Laurent-du-Pont and it's my uncle, a man of fifty years, a cultivator who has never left the land." The court decided that someone had given a false name.

On 30 December, the jury retired to consider its verdict, returning to acquit all the prisoners. When the latter rose to thank the jury, the audience in the courtroom cheered and applauded them.

== Reactions to the trial ==
In London, The Graphic opined that "Of the guilt of every one of them, both Frenchmen and Italians, there was no doubt whatever, and nobody, it is stated, was more astonished at the verdict than the rioters themselves. But because the greater number of the victims of the rioting last August were Italians, the jury felt it incumbent on themselves to demonstrate their patriotism by practically declaring that for a French workman to kill an Italian competitor is no crime at all." The paper went on to exonerate the French government: "All that could be done to secure a fair trial was done by changing the venue to a district undisturbed by local jealousy of foreign labour, and for indicting the prisoners for unlawfully wounding as well as on the graver charge, so that the jury might at least have inflicted a mitigated punishment upon them."

The Italian press was incensed. Folchetto said that after this political sentence, France could no longer count Italy as a friend. Opinione said the verdict was deplorable from the point of view of justice because it left horrible crimes unpunished. Italia and Popolo described the verdict as scandalous and notorious, but added that the French government could not be held responsible for the acts of juries. Il Messaggero expressed sympathy with French journalists who, it said, with such honesty and good sense, had described the verdict as scandalous. When the Italian premier, Francesco Crispi, heard that the jury had acquitted the defendants, he exclaimed, "Juries are alike in all countries."

== See also ==
- March 14, 1891, lynchings

== Sources ==
- Barnabà, Enzo (1993) (trad. Claude Galli), Le sang des marais : Aigues-Mortes, 17 août 1893, une tragédie de l'immigration italienne, Marseille: Via Valeriano, OCLC 463750554
- Cubero, José-Ramón (1995), Nationalistes et étrangers: le massacre d'Aigues-Mortes, Presse universitaire de France, ISBN 9782902702961
- Duggan, Christopher (2008). The Force of Destiny: A History of Italy Since 1796, Houghton Mifflin Harcourt, ISBN 0-618-35367-4
- Gozzini, Giovanni (2005). Le migrazioni di ieri e di oggi. Milan: Bruno Mondadori.
- Noiriel, Gérard (2010). Le massacre des Italiens: Aigues-Mortes, 17 août 1893. Paris: Fayard. ISBN 9782213660158.
- Robb, Graham (2007). The Discovery of France. London: Picador.
- Rouquette, Michel-Louis (1997), La chasse à l'immigré : violence, mémoire et représentations, Bruxelles : P. Mardaga.
- Seton-Watson, Christopher (1967). Italy from liberalism to fascism, 1870–1925. New York: Taylor & Francis. ISBN 0-416-18940-7.
